= Struhařov =

Struhařov may refer to places in the Central Bohemian Region of the Czech Republic:

- Struhařov (Benešov District), a municipality and village
- Struhařov (Prague-East District), a municipality and village
- Struhařov, a village and part of Kamenice (Prague-East District)
