= Oleška =

- Municipality
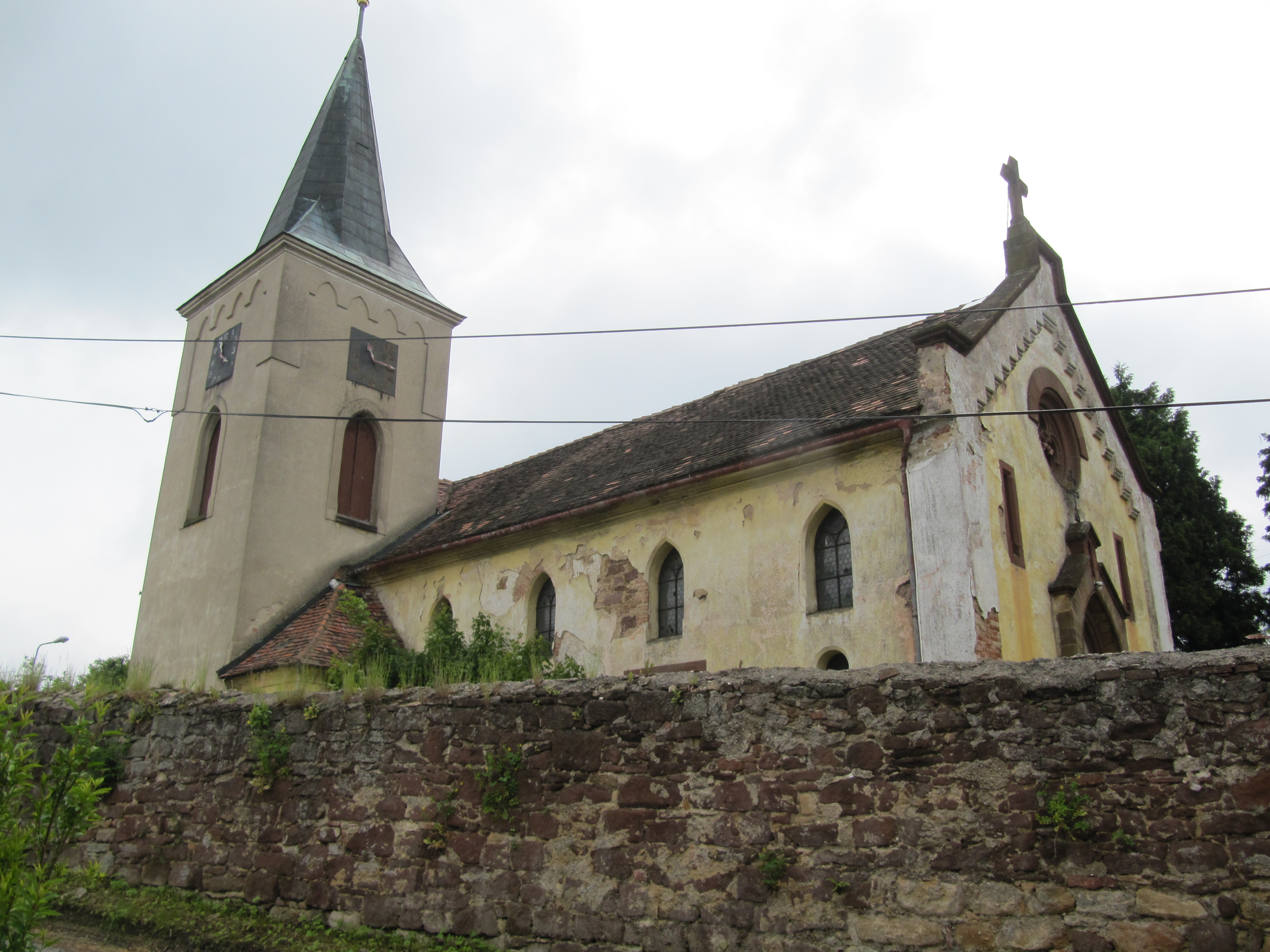
- Church of All Saints

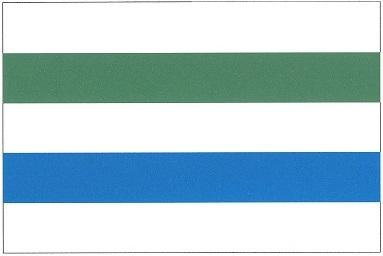
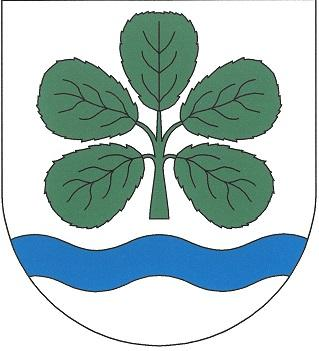
- Flag Coat of arms

- Location in the Czech Republic
- Coordinates: 49°58′18″N 14°55′0″E
- Country: Czech Republic
- Region: Central Bohemian
- District: Prague-East
- First mentioned: 1348

Area
  - Total: 11.94 km^{2} (4.61 sq mi)
- Elevation: 369 m (1,211 ft)

Population (2026-01-01)
  - Total: 997
  - Density: 83.5/km^{2} (216/sq mi)
- Time zone: UTC+1 (CET)
  - Summer (DST): UTC+2 (CEST)
- Postal codes: 281 62, 281 63
- Website: www.oleska.cz

Oleška is a municipality and village in Prague-East District in the Central Bohemian Region of the Czech Republic. It has about 1,000 inhabitants.

== Administrative division ==
Oleška consists of five municipal parts (in brackets population according to the 2021 census):

- Oleška (435)
- Brník (166)
- Bulánka (135)
- Králka (58)
- Krymlov (178)

== Demographics ==
Historical population
Year	Pop.	±%
1869	1,480	—
1880	1,919	+29.7%
1890	1,994	+3.9%
1900	1,951	−2.2%
1910	1,659	−15.0%
1921	1,560	−6.0%
1930	1,377	−11.7%
1950	1,061	−22.9%
1961	1,065	+0.4%
1970	945	−11.3%
1980	943	−0.2%
1991	865	−8.3%
2001	840	−2.9%
2011	904	+7.6%
2021	972	+7.5%
Source: Censuses
