= Štíhlice =

- Municipality
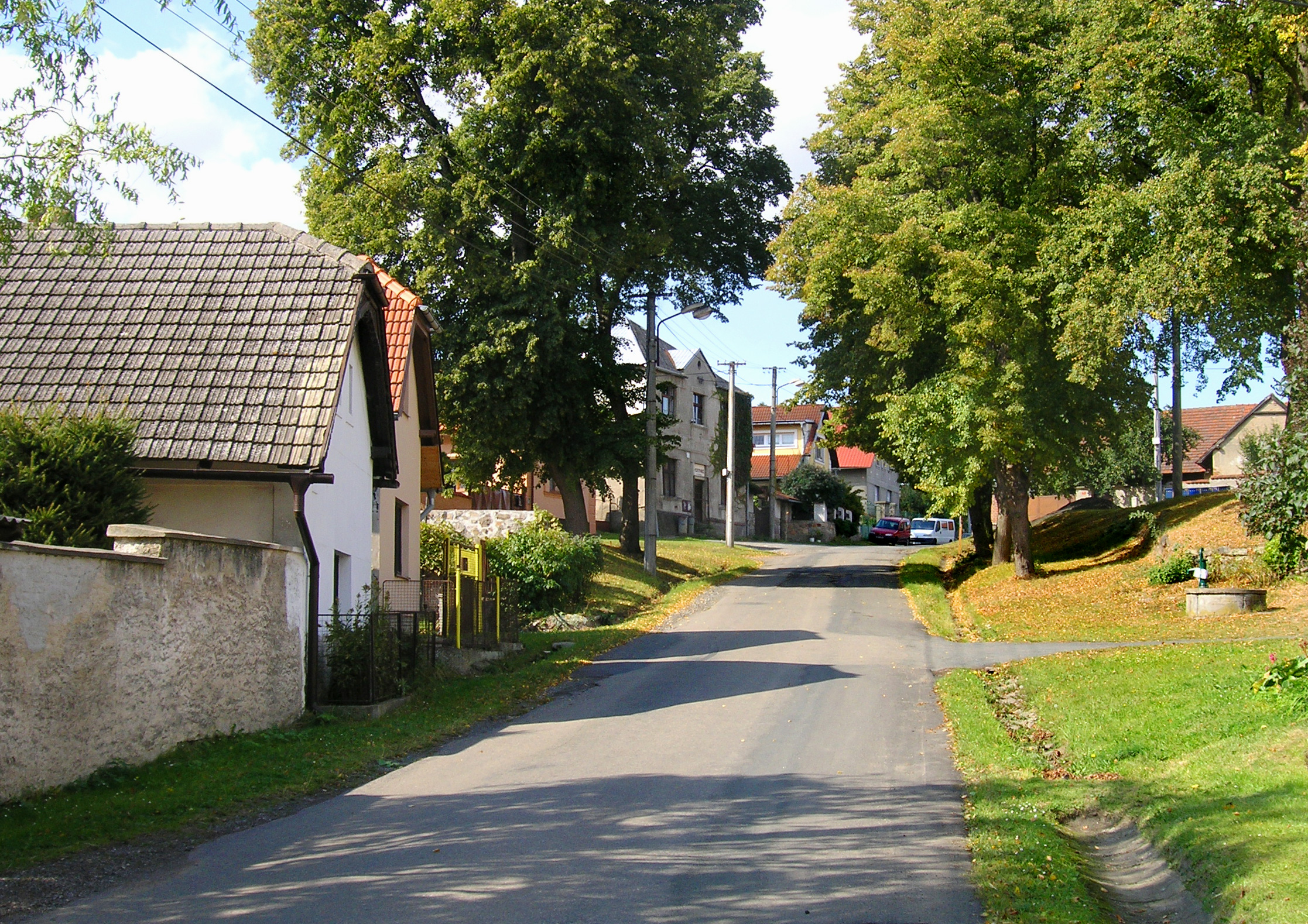
- Centre of Štíhlice

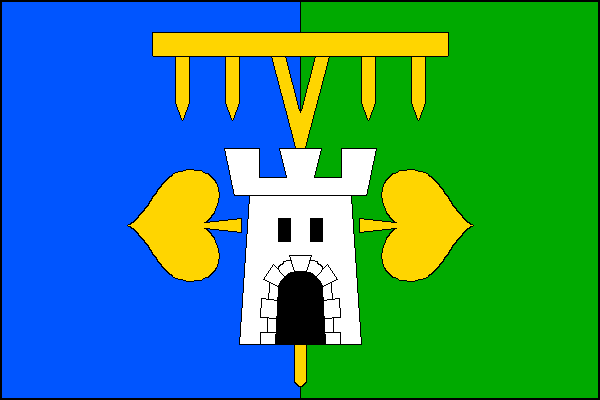
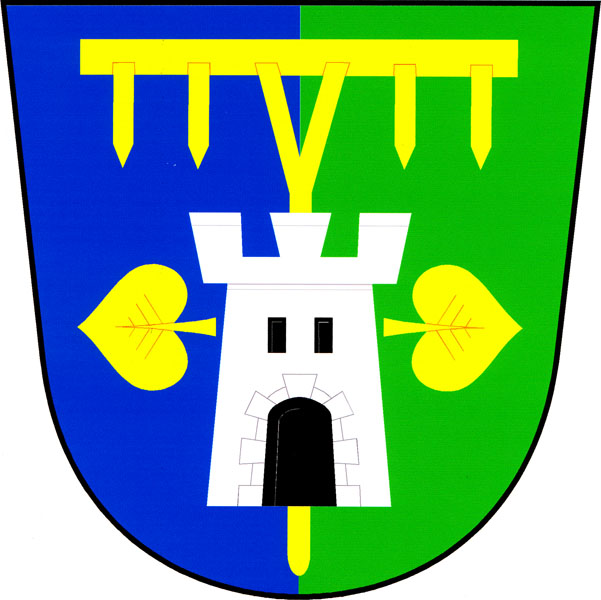
- Flag Coat of arms

- Location in the Czech Republic
- Coordinates: 50°0′20″N 14°46′48″E
- Country: Czech Republic
- Region: Central Bohemian
- District: Prague-East
- First mentioned: 1358

Area
  - Total: 5.19 km^{2} (2.00 sq mi)
- Elevation: 385 m (1,263 ft)

Population (2026-01-01)
  - Total: 244
  - Density: 47.0/km^{2} (122/sq mi)
- Time zone: UTC+1 (CET)
  - Summer (DST): UTC+2 (CEST)
- Postal code: 281 63
- Website: www.stihlice.cz

Štíhlice is a municipality and village in Prague-East District in the Central Bohemian Region of the Czech Republic. It has about 200 inhabitants.

== Demographics ==
Historical population
Year	Pop.	±%
1869	275	—
1880	276	+0.4%
1890	287	+4.0%
1900	279	−2.8%
1910	267	−4.3%
1921	265	−0.7%
1930	247	−6.8%
1950	192	−22.3%
1961	172	−10.4%
1970	146	−15.1%
1980	158	+8.2%
1991	108	−31.6%
2001	109	+0.9%
2011	164	+50.5%
2021	257	+56.7%
Source: Censuses
