= Vlkančice =

- Municipality
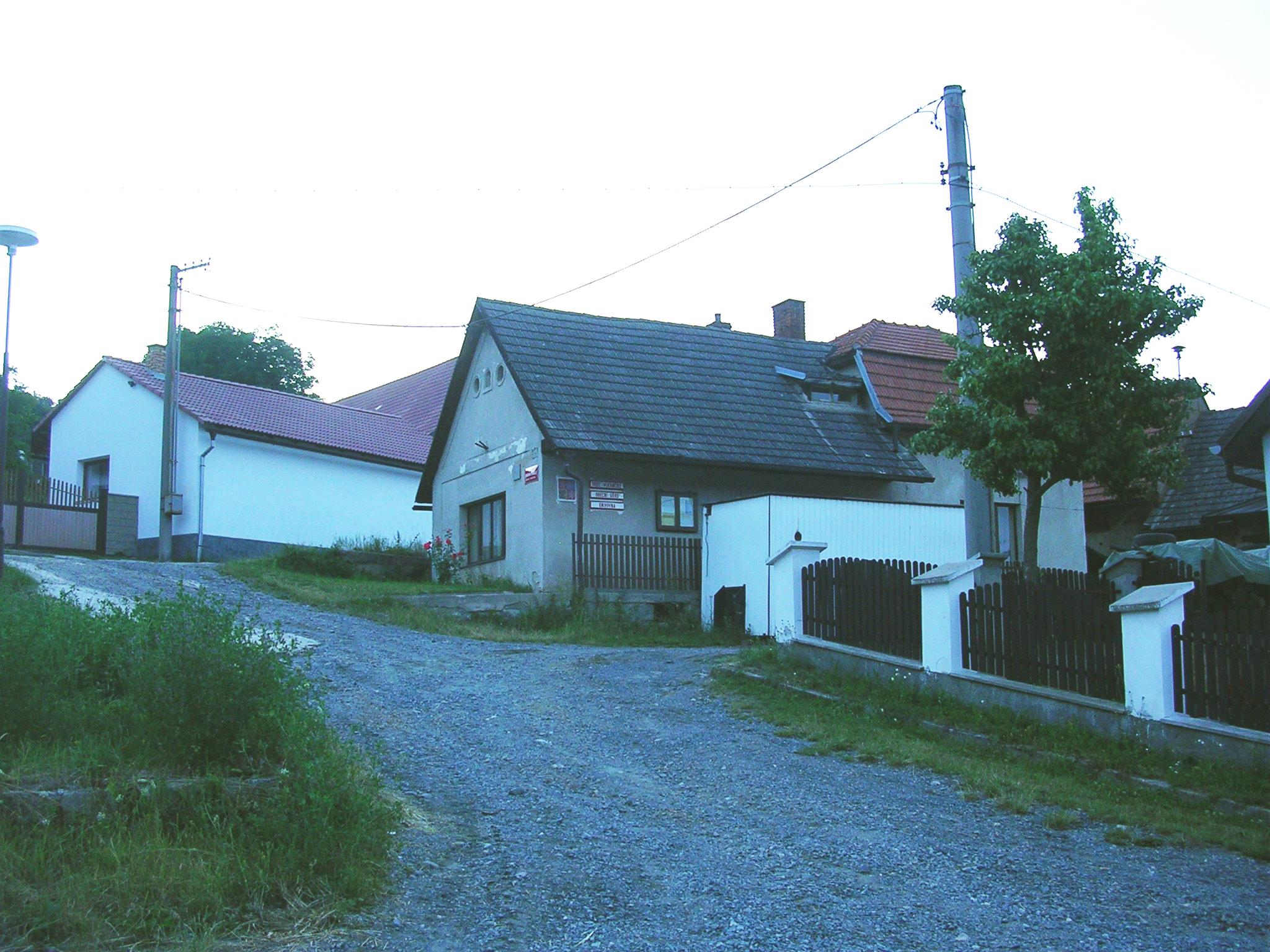
- Municipal office

- Location in the Czech Republic
- Coordinates: 49°54′7″N 14°53′50″E
- Country: Czech Republic
- Region: Central Bohemian
- District: Prague-East
- First mentioned: 1436

Area
  - Total: 7.30 km^{2} (2.82 sq mi)
- Elevation: 357 m (1,171 ft)

Population (2026-01-01)
  - Total: 239
  - Density: 32.7/km^{2} (84.8/sq mi)
- Time zone: UTC+1 (CET)
  - Summer (DST): UTC+2 (CEST)
- Postal code: 281 63
- Website: www.vlkancice.cz

Vlkančice is a municipality and village in Prague-East District in the Central Bohemian Region of the Czech Republic. It has about 200 inhabitants.

== Administrative division ==
Vlkančice consists of two municipal parts (in brackets population according to the 2021 census):

- Vlkančice (156)
- Pyskočely (78)

== History ==
The first written mention of Vlkančice is from 1436.

== Demographics ==
Historical population
Year	Pop.	±%
1869	385	—
1880	407	+5.7%
1890	381	−6.4%
1900	391	+2.6%
1910	347	−11.3%
1921	310	−10.7%
1930	298	−3.9%
1950	264	−11.4%
1961	199	−24.6%
1970	154	−22.6%
1980	102	−33.8%
1991	101	−1.0%
2001	87	−13.9%
2011	146	+67.8%
2021	234	+60.3%
Source: Censuses
