= Konětopy =

- Municipality
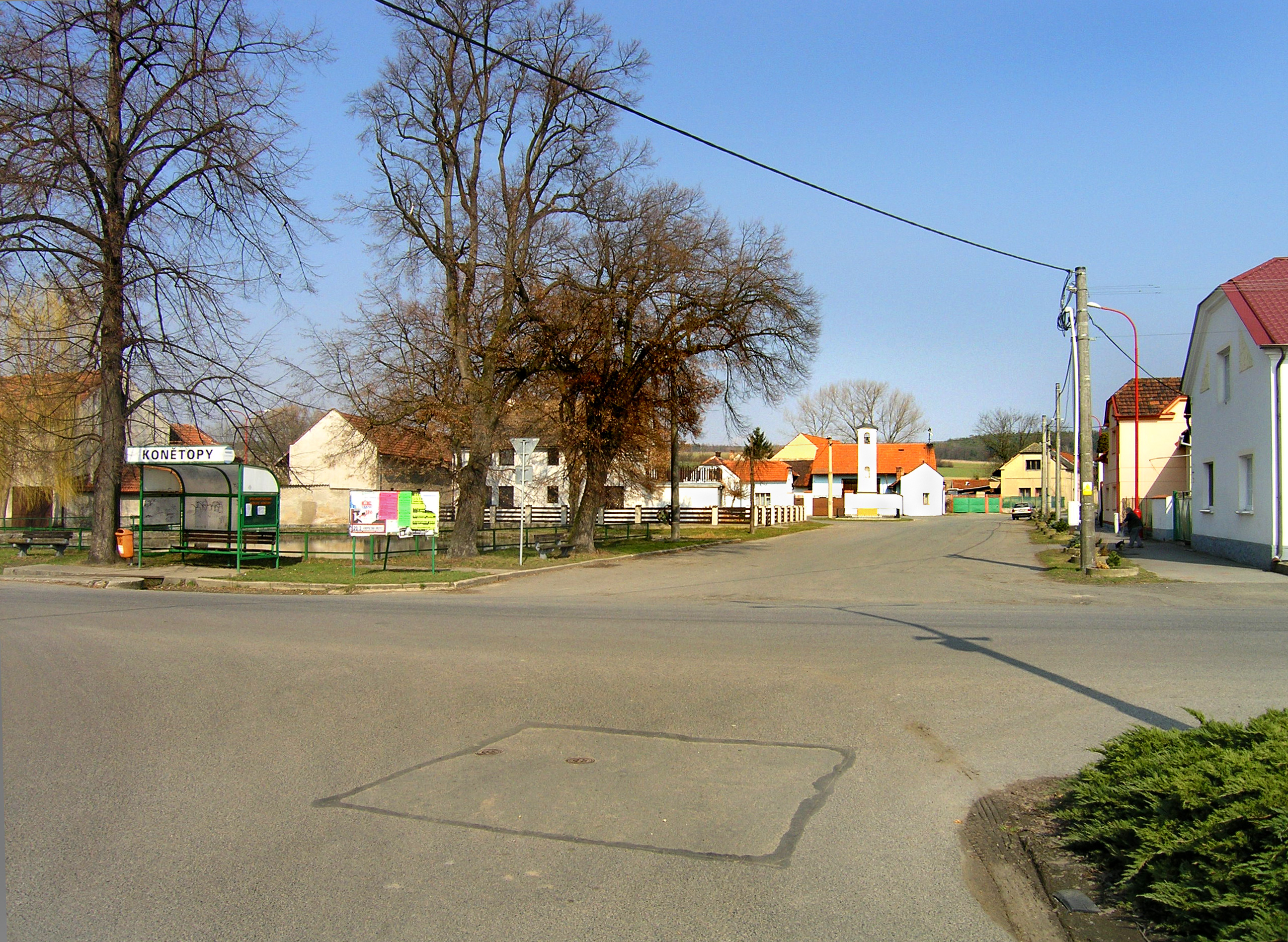
- Centre of Konětopy

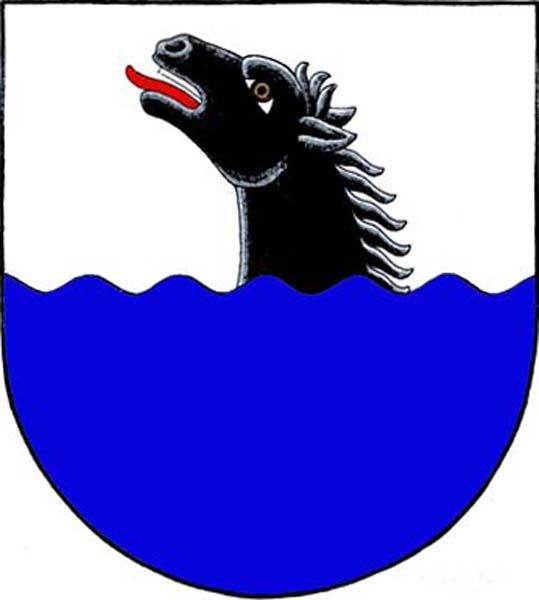
- Flag Coat of arms

- Location in the Czech Republic
- Coordinates: 50°16′35″N 14°39′14″E
- Country: Czech Republic
- Region: Central Bohemian
- District: Prague-East
- First mentioned: 1391

Area
  - Total: 3.03 km^{2} (1.17 sq mi)
- Elevation: 184 m (604 ft)

Population (2026-01-01)
  - Total: 344
  - Density: 114/km^{2} (294/sq mi)
- Time zone: UTC+1 (CET)
  - Summer (DST): UTC+2 (CEST)
- Postal code: 277 14
- Website: konetopy.cz

Konětopy is a municipality and village in Prague-East District in the Central Bohemian Region of the Czech Republic. It has about 300 inhabitants.

== Demographics ==
Historical population
Year	Pop.	±%
1869	395	—
1880	400	+1.3%
1890	412	+3.0%
1900	443	+7.5%
1910	459	+3.6%
1921	451	−1.7%
1930	425	−5.8%
1950	347	−18.4%
1961	348	+0.3%
1970	333	−4.3%
1980	317	−4.8%
1991	270	−14.8%
2001	259	−4.1%
2011	312	+20.5%
2021	325	+4.2%
Source: Censuses
