= Výžerky =

- Municipality
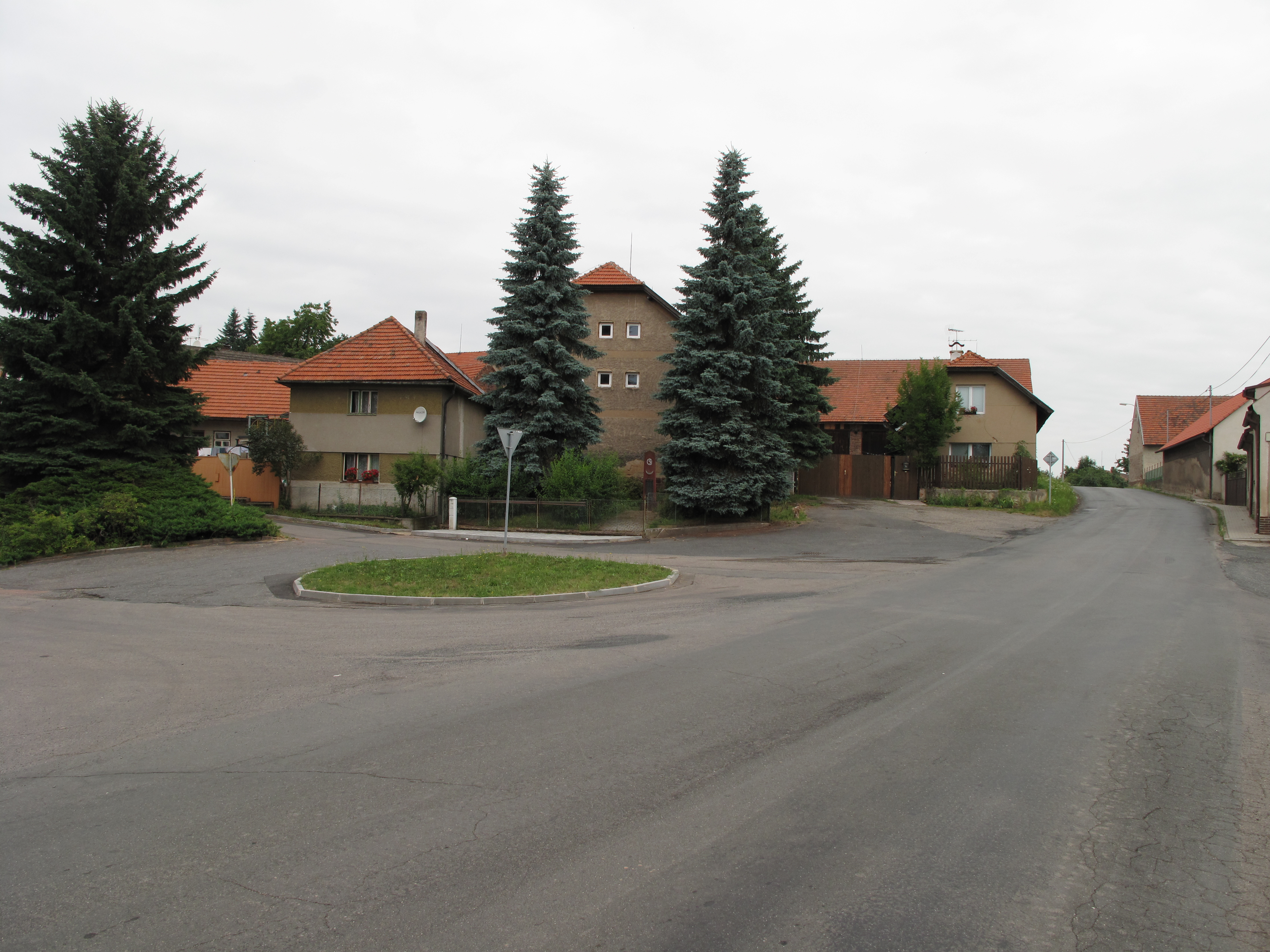
- Centre of Výžerky

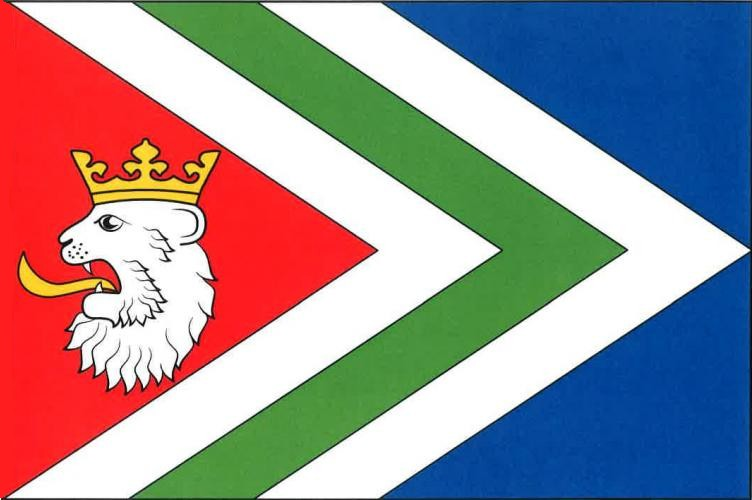
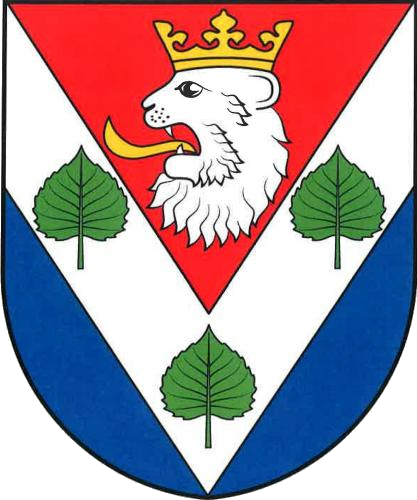
- Flag Coat of arms

- Location in the Czech Republic
- Coordinates: 49°56′42″N 14°53′0″E
- Country: Czech Republic
- Region: Central Bohemian
- District: Prague-East
- First mentioned: 1339

Area
  - Total: 6.56 km^{2} (2.53 sq mi)
- Elevation: 352 m (1,155 ft)

Population (2026-01-01)
  - Total: 183
  - Density: 27.9/km^{2} (72.3/sq mi)
- Time zone: UTC+1 (CET)
  - Summer (DST): UTC+2 (CEST)
- Postal code: 281 63
- Website: www.obec-vyzerky.cz

Výžerky is a municipality and village in Prague-East District in the Central Bohemian Region of the Czech Republic. It has about 200 inhabitants.

== Demographics ==
Historical population
Year	Pop.	±%
1869	269	—
1880	299	+11.2%
1890	332	+11.0%
1900	331	−0.3%
1910	328	−0.9%
1921	303	−7.6%
1930	296	−2.3%
1950	176	−40.5%
1961	213	+21.0%
1970	171	−19.7%
1980	145	−15.2%
1991	108	−25.5%
2001	97	−10.2%
2011	144	+48.5%
2021	192	+33.3%
Source: Censuses
