= Zvánovice =

- Municipality
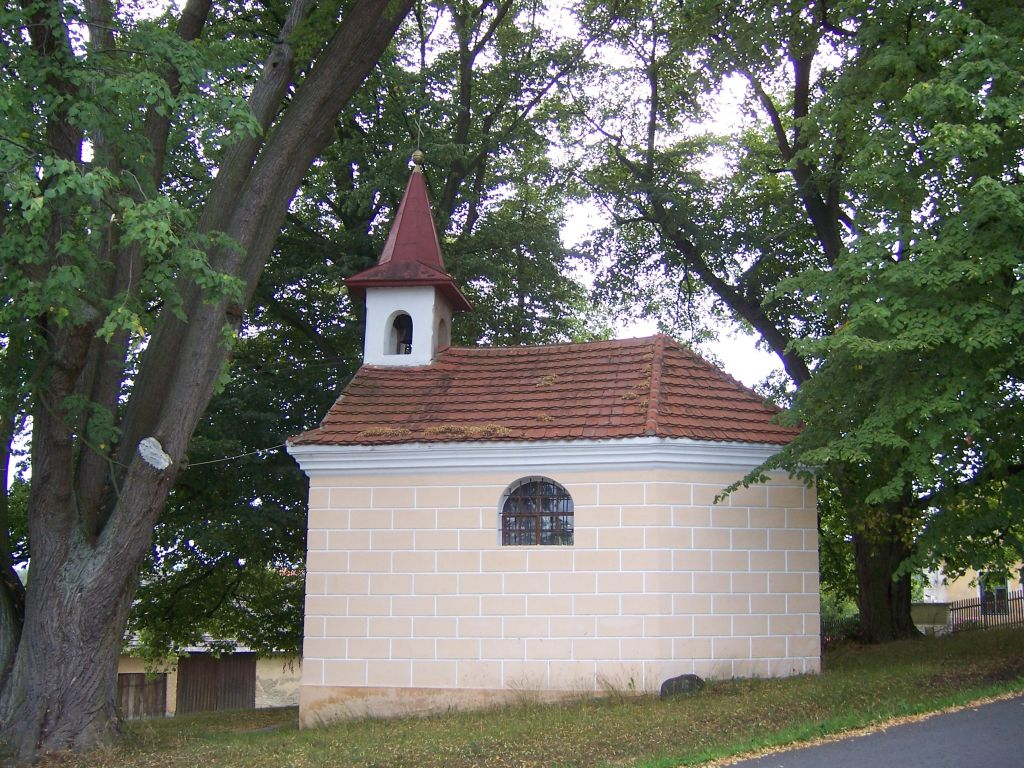
- Chapel of Saint John of Nepomuk

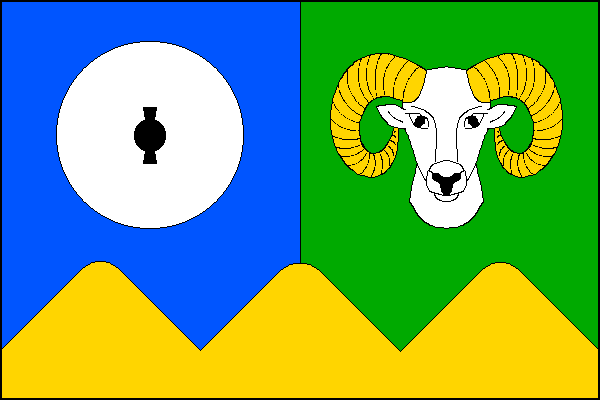
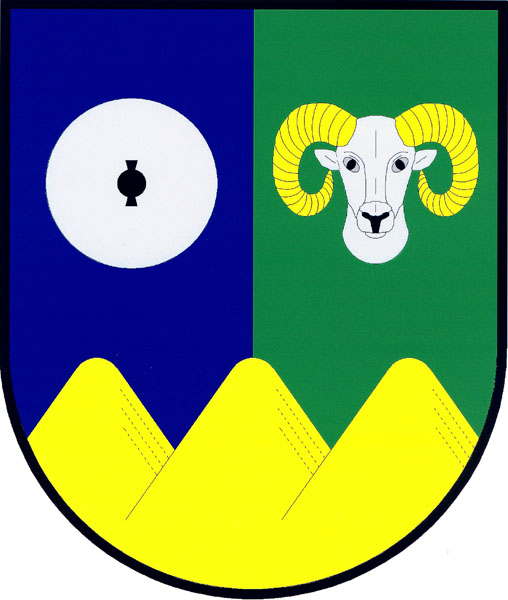
- Flag Coat of arms

- Location in the Czech Republic
- Coordinates: 49°55′55″N 14°46′49″E
- Country: Czech Republic
- Region: Central Bohemian
- District: Prague-East
- First mentioned: 1320

Area
  - Total: 6.50 km^{2} (2.51 sq mi)
- Elevation: 418 m (1,371 ft)

Population (2026-01-01)
  - Total: 619
  - Density: 95.2/km^{2} (247/sq mi)
- Time zone: UTC+1 (CET)
  - Summer (DST): UTC+2 (CEST)
- Postal code: 251 65
- Website: www.obeczvanovice.cz

Zvánovice is a municipality and village in Prague-East District in the Central Bohemian Region of the Czech Republic. It has about 600 inhabitants.

== History ==
The first written mention of Zvánovice is from 1320.

== Demographics ==
Historical population
Year	Pop.	±%
1869	544	—
1880	520	−4.4%
1890	511	−1.7%
1900	522	+2.2%
1910	509	−2.5%
1921	473	−7.1%
1930	458	−3.2%
1950	375	−18.1%
1961	402	+7.2%
1970	387	−3.7%
1980	352	−9.0%
1991	300	−14.8%
2001	301	+0.3%
2011	507	+68.4%
2021	600	+18.3%
Source: Censuses
