= Vyšehořovice =

- Municipality
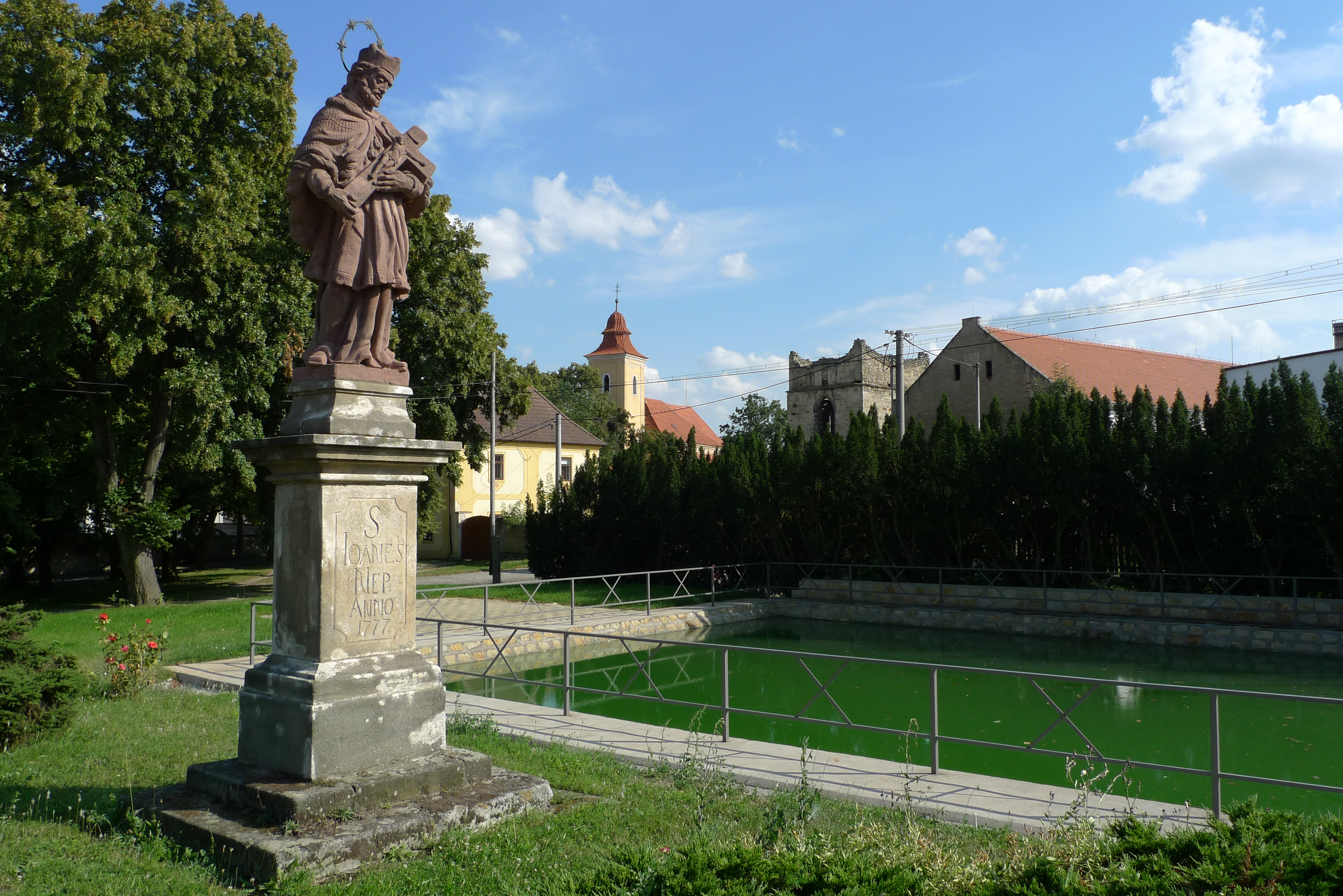
- Centre of Vyšehořovice

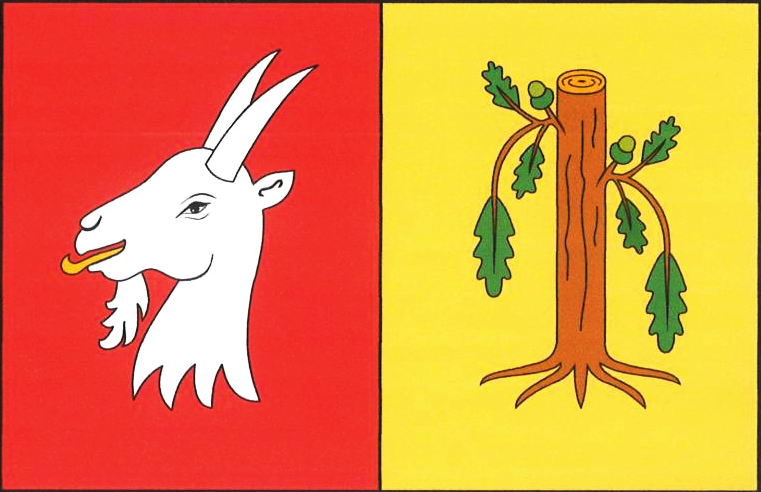
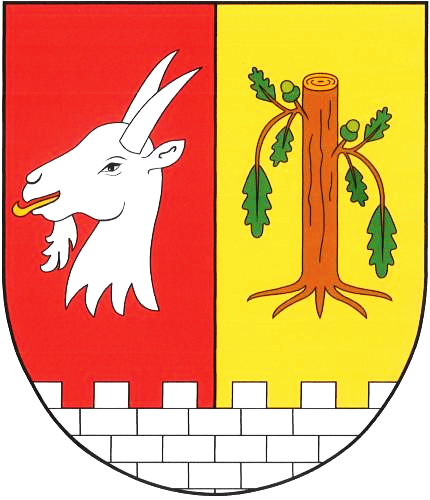
- Flag Coat of arms

- Location in the Czech Republic
- Coordinates: 50°7′4″N 14°46′26″E
- Country: Czech Republic
- Region: Central Bohemian
- District: Prague-East
- First mentioned: 1178

Area
  - Total: 6.60 km^{2} (2.55 sq mi)
- Elevation: 239 m (784 ft)

Population (2026-01-01)
  - Total: 682
  - Density: 103/km^{2} (268/sq mi)
- Time zone: UTC+1 (CET)
  - Summer (DST): UTC+2 (CEST)
- Postal code: 250 87
- Website: www.vysehorovice.cz

Vyšehořovice (German: Wischerowitz) is a municipality and village in Prague-East District in the Central Bohemian Region of the Czech Republic. It has about 700 inhabitants.

== Administrative division ==
Vyšehořovice consists of two municipal parts (in brackets population according to the 2021 census):

- Vyšehořovice (558)
- Kozovazy (98)

== Demographics ==
Historical population
Year	Pop.	±%
1869	605	—
1880	620	+2.5%
1890	668	+7.7%
1900	652	−2.4%
1910	703	+7.8%
1921	737	+4.8%
1930	737	+0.0%
1950	559	−24.2%
1961	543	−2.9%
1970	531	−2.2%
1980	549	+3.4%
1991	515	−6.2%
2001	537	+4.3%
2011	601	+11.9%
2021	656	+9.2%
Source: Censuses
