= Prusice (Prague-East District) =

- Municipality
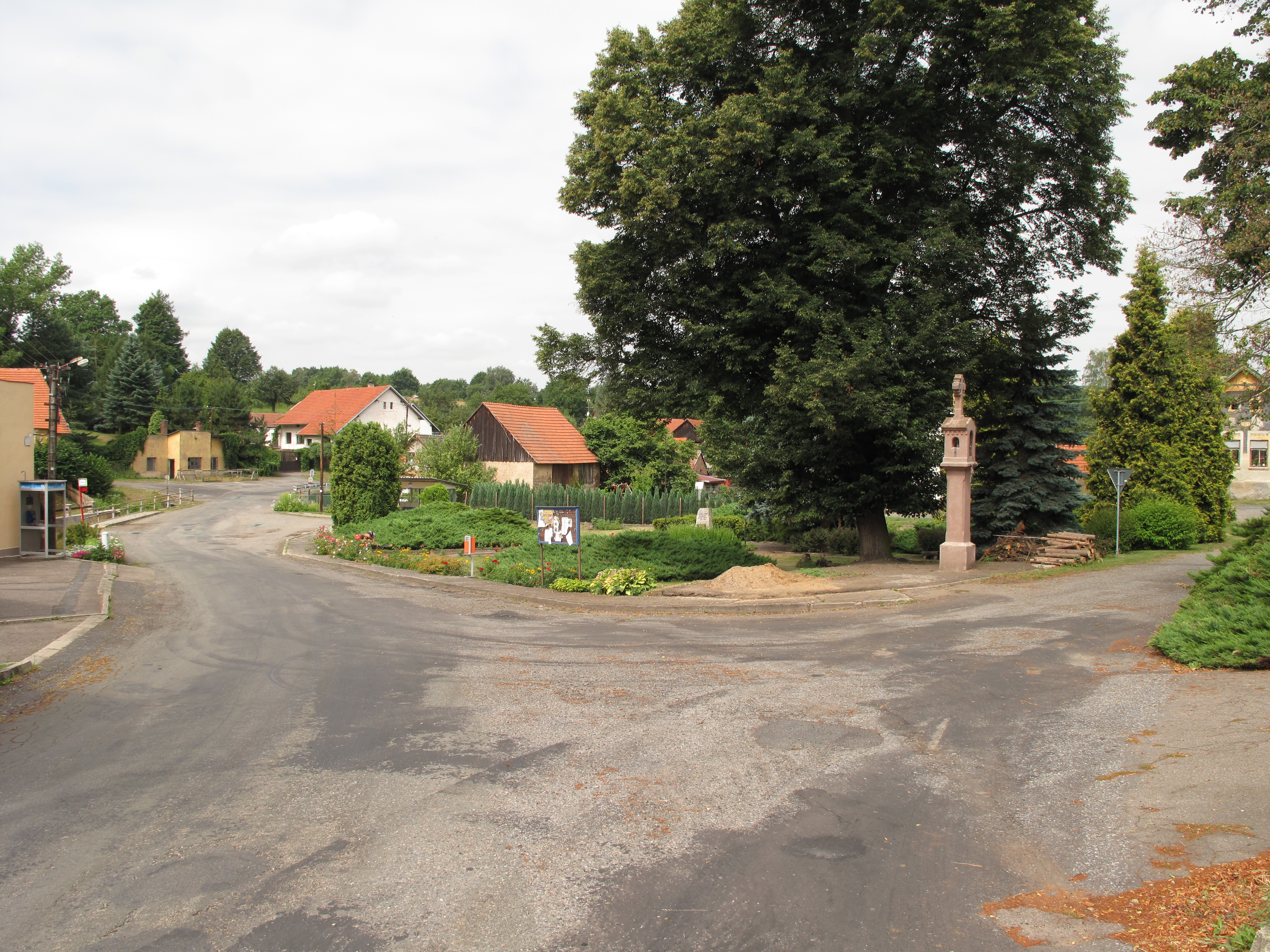
- Centre of Prusice

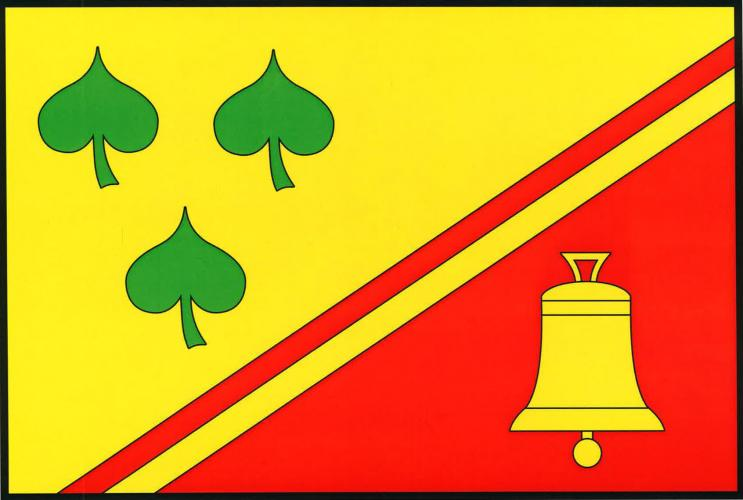
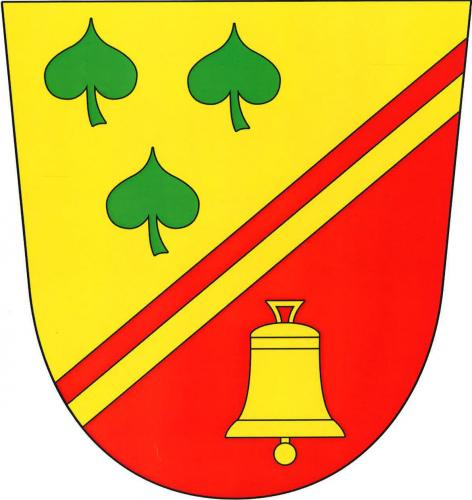
- Flag Coat of arms

- Location in the Czech Republic
- Coordinates: 49°58′6″N 14°52′41″E
- Country: Czech Republic
- Region: Central Bohemian
- District: Prague-East
- First mentioned: 1228

Area
  - Total: 2.57 km^{2} (0.99 sq mi)
- Elevation: 372 m (1,220 ft)

Population (2026-01-01)
  - Total: 97
  - Density: 38/km^{2} (98/sq mi)
- Time zone: UTC+1 (CET)
  - Summer (DST): UTC+2 (CEST)
- Postal code: 281 63
- Website: www.prusice.cz

Prusice is a municipality and village in Prague-East District in the Central Bohemian Region of the Czech Republic. It has about 100 inhabitants.

== History ==
The first written mention of Prusice is from 1228.

== Demographics ==
Historical population
Year	Pop.	±%
1869	209	—
1880	218	+4.3%
1890	207	−5.0%
1900	178	−14.0%
1910	198	+11.2%
1921	164	−17.2%
1930	158	−3.7%
1950	130	−17.7%
1961	122	−6.2%
1970	96	−21.3%
1980	84	−12.5%
1991	66	−21.4%
2001	65	−1.5%
2011	82	+26.2%
2021	94	+14.6%
Source: Censuses
