= Máslovice =

- Municipality
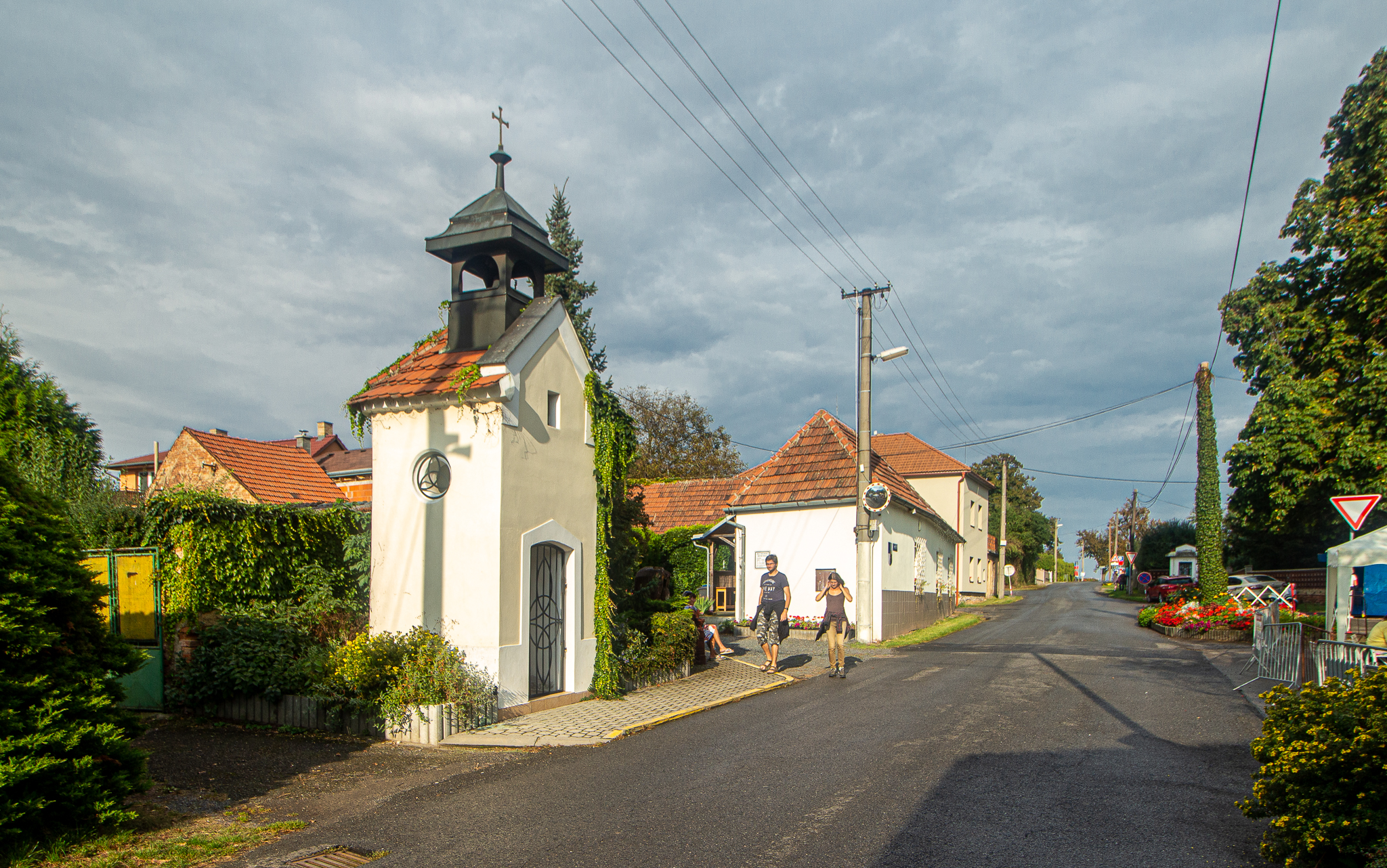
- Centre of Máslovice

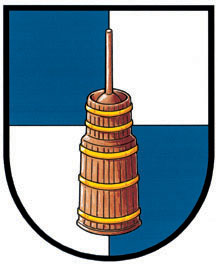
- Coat of arms

- Location in the Czech Republic
- Coordinates: 50°12′31″N 14°22′44″E
- Country: Czech Republic
- Region: Central Bohemian
- District: Prague-East
- First mentioned: 1052

Area
  - Total: 3.09 km^{2} (1.19 sq mi)
- Elevation: 265 m (869 ft)

Population (2026-01-01)
  - Total: 396
  - Density: 128/km^{2} (332/sq mi)
- Time zone: UTC+1 (CET)
  - Summer (DST): UTC+2 (CEST)
- Postal code: 250 69
- Website: www.maslovice.cz

Máslovice is a municipality and village in Prague-East District in the Central Bohemian Region of the Czech Republic. It has about 400 inhabitants.

== Demographics ==
Historical population
Year	Pop.	±%
1869	226	—
1880	264	+16.8%
1890	240	−9.1%
1900	314	+30.8%
1910	305	−2.9%
1921	324	+6.2%
1930	374	+15.4%
1950	316	−15.5%
1961	350	+10.8%
1970	330	−5.7%
1980	302	−8.5%
1991	248	−17.9%
2001	278	+12.1%
2011	314	+12.9%
2021	388	+23.6%
Source: Censuses
