= Klíčany =

- Municipality
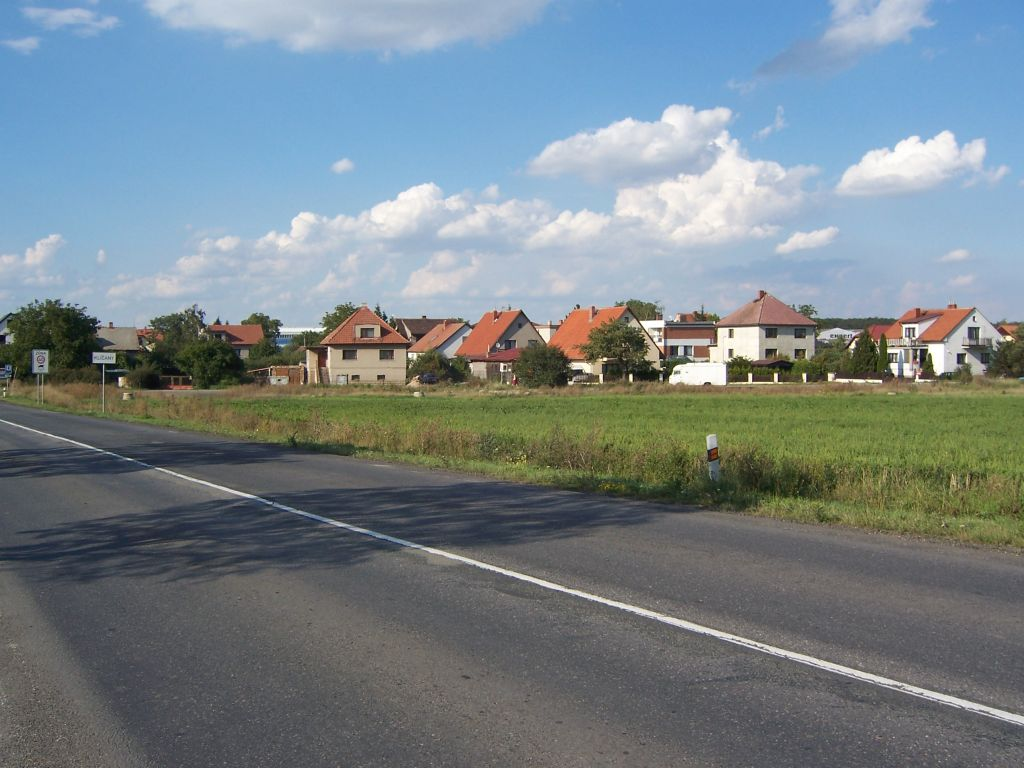
- Entrance to Klíčany

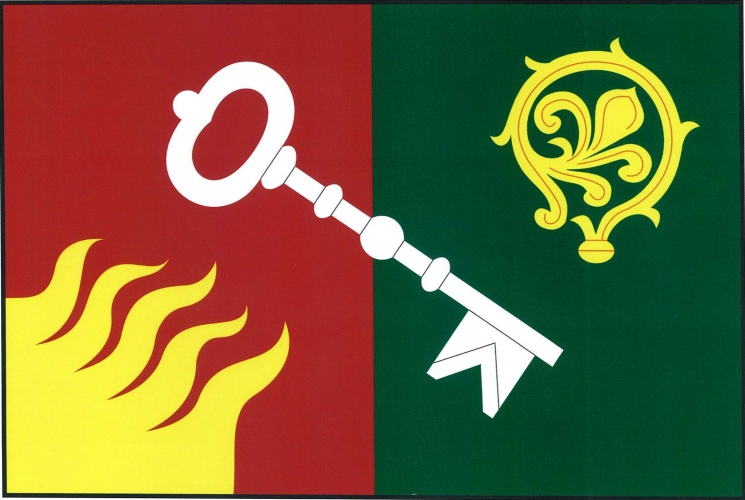
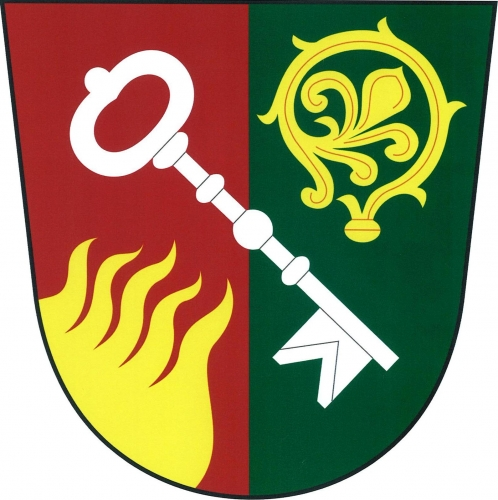
- Flag Coat of arms

- Location in the Czech Republic
- Coordinates: 50°12′8″N 14°26′4″E
- Country: Czech Republic
- Region: Central Bohemian
- District: Prague-East
- First mentioned: 1380

Area
  - Total: 4.00 km^{2} (1.54 sq mi)
- Elevation: 268 m (879 ft)

Population (2026-01-01)
  - Total: 665
  - Density: 166/km^{2} (431/sq mi)
- Time zone: UTC+1 (CET)
  - Summer (DST): UTC+2 (CEST)
- Postal code: 250 69
- Website: www.klicany.cz

Klíčany is a municipality and village in Prague-East District in the Central Bohemian Region of the Czech Republic. It has about 700 inhabitants.

== Demographics ==
Historical population
Year	Pop.	±%
1869	213	—
1880	223	+4.7%
1890	273	+22.4%
1900	227	−16.8%
1910	341	+50.2%
1921	308	−9.7%
1930	314	+1.9%
1950	266	−15.3%
1961	314	+18.0%
1970	283	−9.9%
1980	276	−2.5%
1991	288	+4.3%
2001	293	+1.7%
2011	414	+41.3%
2021	563	+36.0%
Source: Censuses
