= Popovičky =

- Municipality
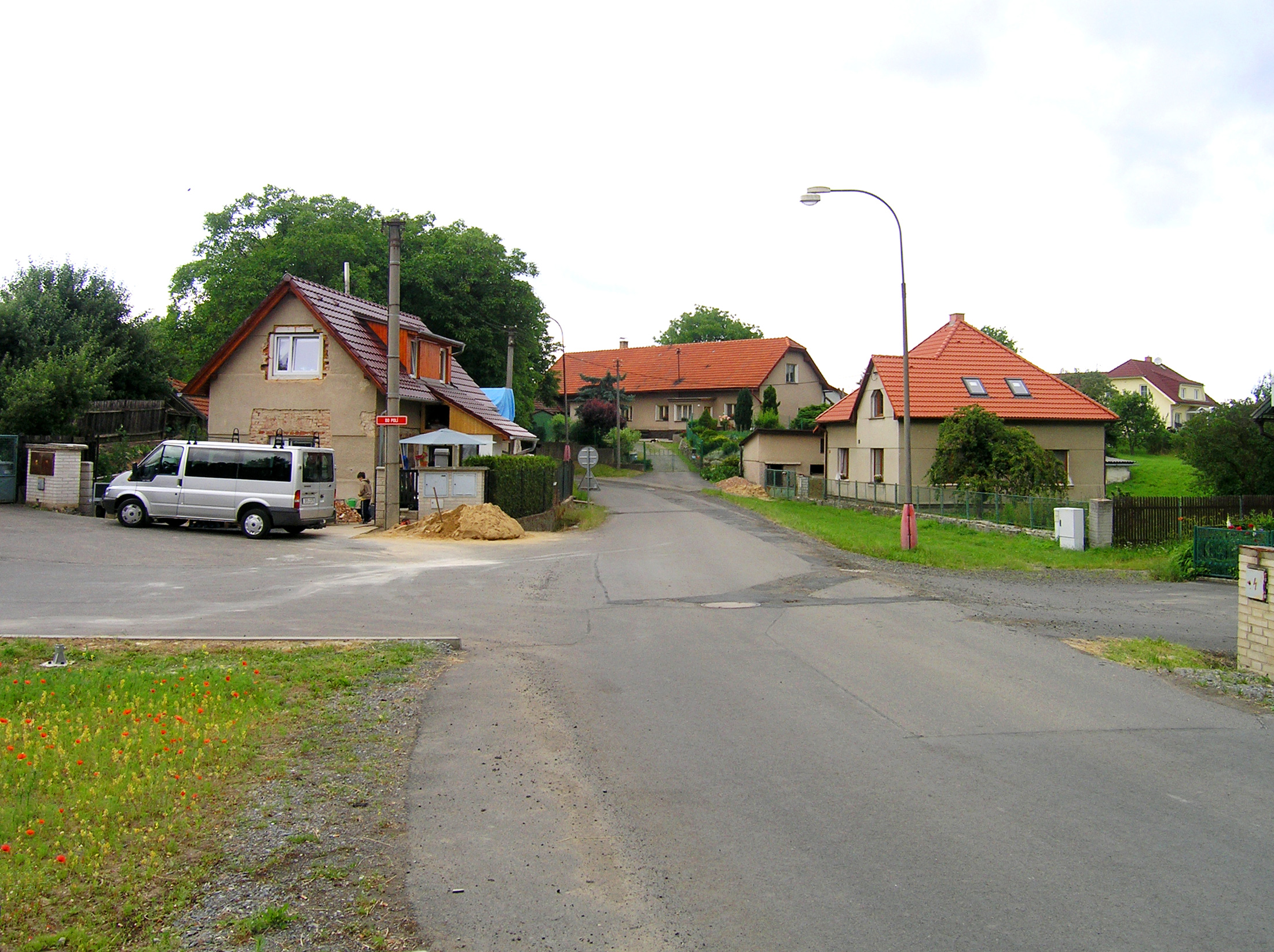
- Lower common

- Flag Coat of arms

- Location in the Czech Republic
- Coordinates: 49°57′45″N 14°35′52″E
- Country: Czech Republic
- Region: Central Bohemian
- District: Prague-East
- First mentioned: 1352

Area
  - Total: 5.20 km^{2} (2.01 sq mi)
- Elevation: 377 m (1,237 ft)

Population (2026-01-01)
  - Total: 481
  - Density: 92.5/km^{2} (240/sq mi)
- Time zone: UTC+1 (CET)
  - Summer (DST): UTC+2 (CEST)
- Postal code: 251 70
- Website: popovicky.cz

Popovičky is a municipality and village in Prague-East District in the Central Bohemian Region of the Czech Republic. It has about 500 inhabitants.

== Administrative division ==
Popovičky consists of three municipal parts (in brackets population according to the 2021 census):

- Popovičky (279)
- Chomutovice (209)
- Nebřenice (17)

== Etymology ==
The name is diminutive of Popovice. It was derived either from the personal name Pop, or from the old Czech word pop (i.e. 'priest'), meaning "the village of Pop's/priest's people".

== Geography ==
Popovičky is located about 10 kilometres (6 mi) southeast of Prague. It lies in the Benešov Uplands. The highest point is at 495 m (1,624 ft) above sea level. The stream Chomutovický potok flows across the municipality.

== History ==
The first written mention of Popovičky is from 1352. Chomutovice was first mentioned in 1205 and Nebřenice in 1437.

== Demographics ==
Historical population

Year	Pop.	±%
1869	279	—
1880	292	+4.7%
1890	283	−3.1%
1900	270	−4.6%
1910	280	+3.7%

Year	Pop.	±%
1921	283	+1.1%
1930	334	+18.0%
1950	204	−38.9%
1961	193	−5.4%
1970	161	−16.6%

Year	Pop.	±%
1980	144	−10.6%
1991	120	−16.7%
2001	154	+28.3%
2011	351	+127.9%
2021	505	+43.9%

Source: Censuses

== Transport ==
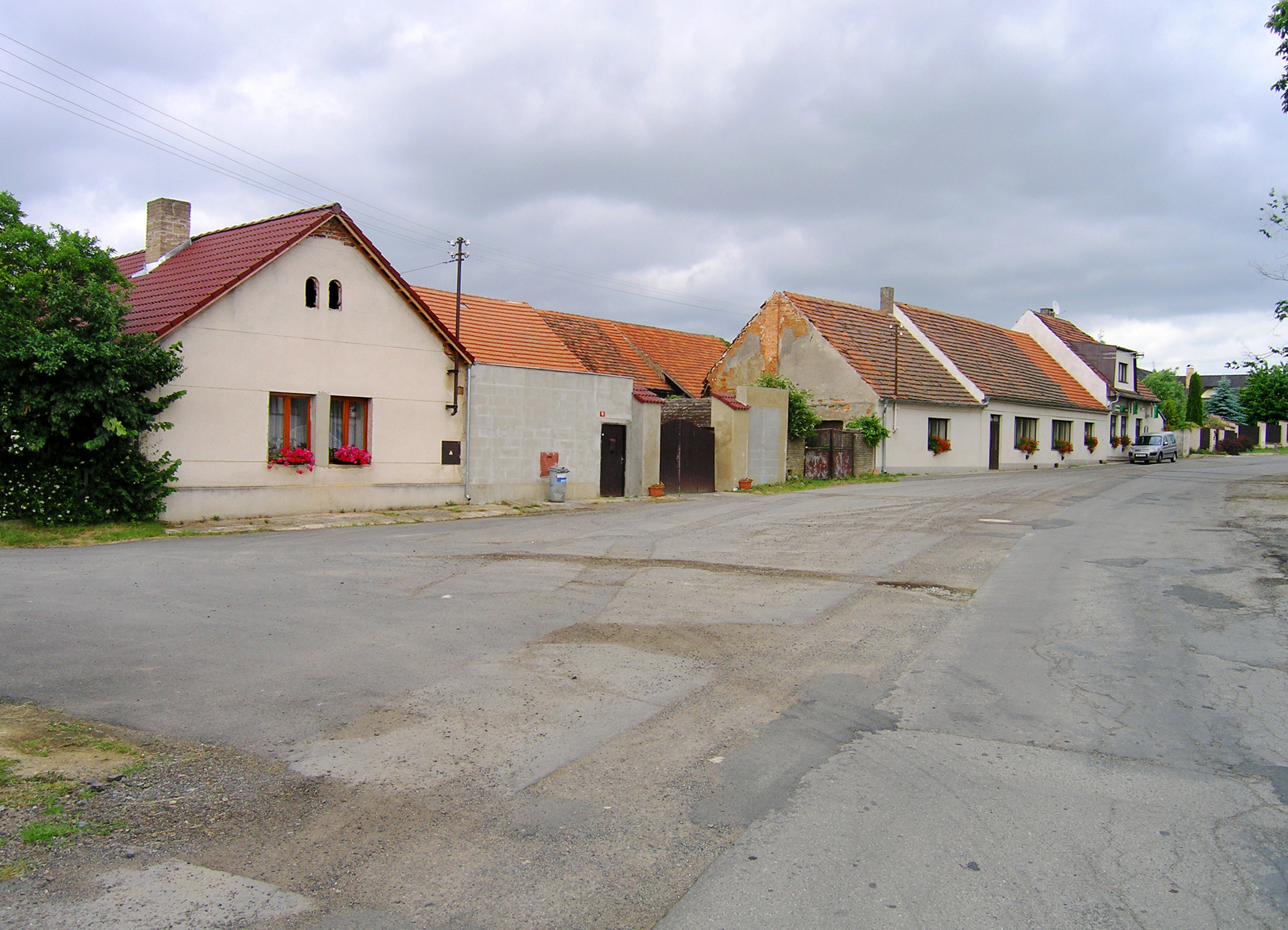
Upper common

There are no railways or major roads passing through the municipality.

== Sport ==
There is a golf course in Nebřenice.

== Sights ==
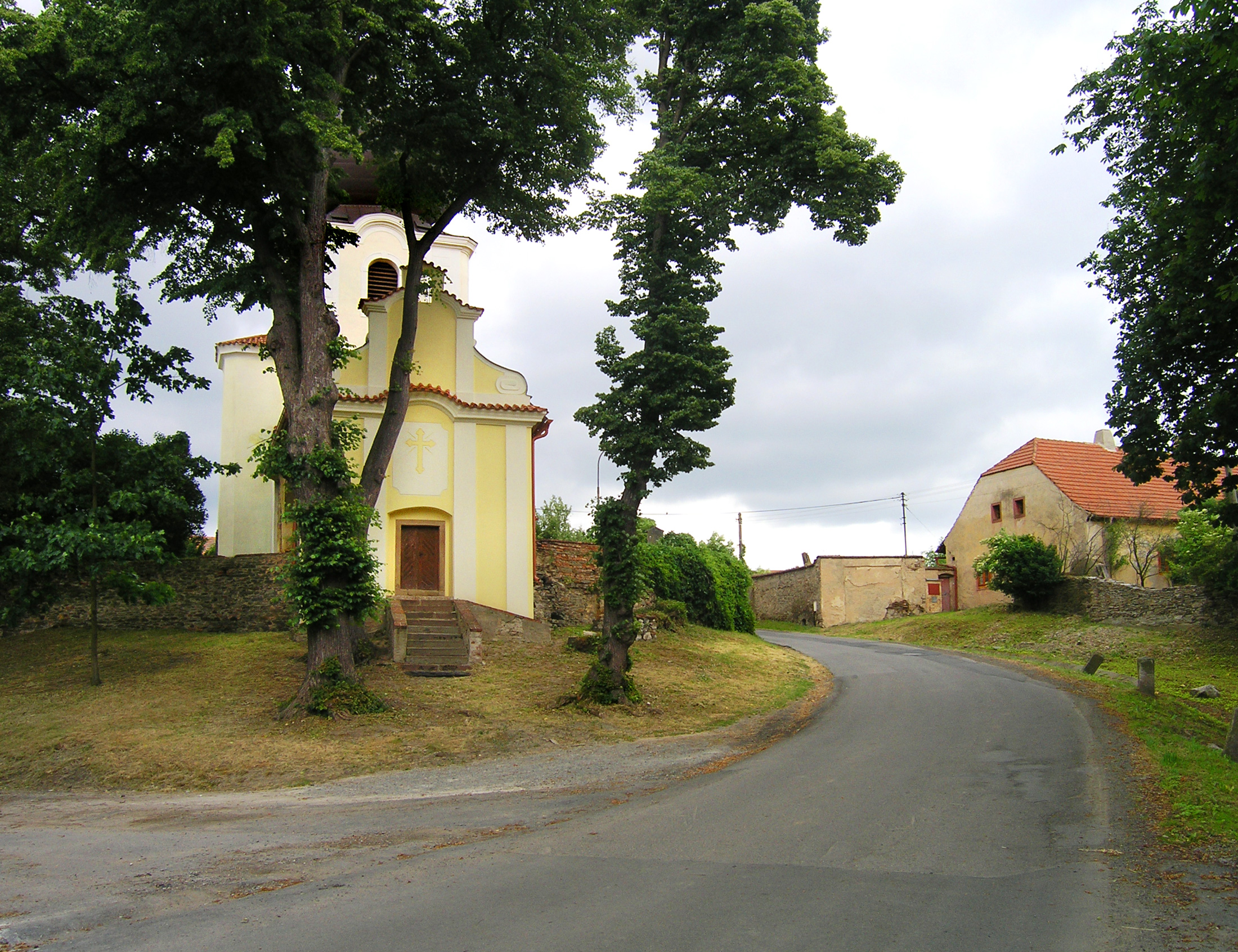
Church of Saint Bartholomew

The main landmark of Popovičky is the Church of Saint Bartholomew. The originally medieval church was completely rebuilt in the Baroque style in 1731–1736.

The Nebřenice Chateau was built as a hunting lodge in the early 19th century. Today, it is the seat of the golf clubhouse.
