= Oplany =

- Municipality
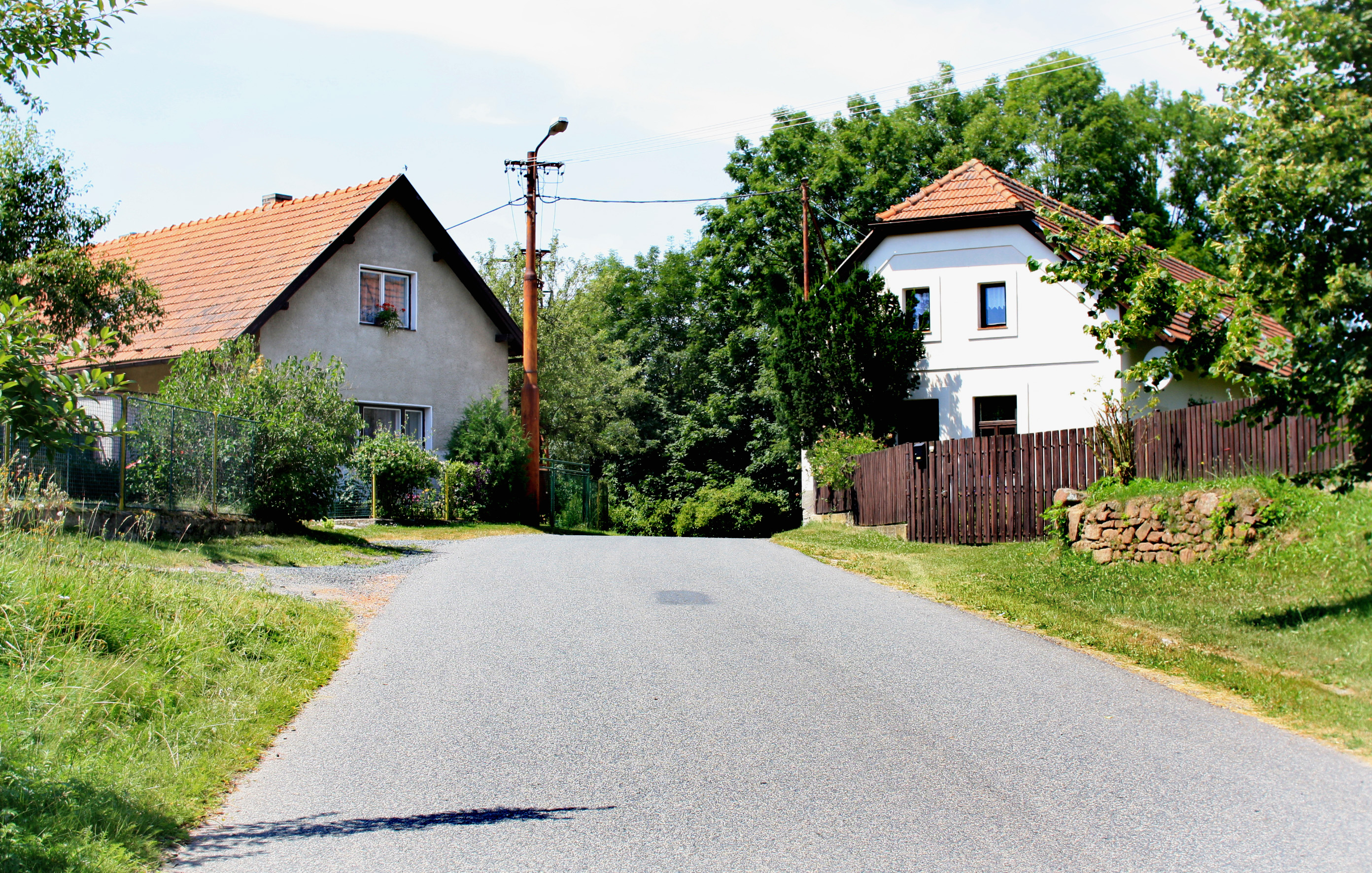
- Upper common

- Flag Coat of arms

- Location in the Czech Republic
- Coordinates: 49°55′27″N 14°52′2″E
- Country: Czech Republic
- Region: Central Bohemian
- District: Prague-East
- First mentioned: 1379

Area
  - Total: 5.81 km^{2} (2.24 sq mi)
- Elevation: 357 m (1,171 ft)

Population (2026-01-01)
  - Total: 106
  - Density: 18.2/km^{2} (47.3/sq mi)
- Time zone: UTC+1 (CET)
  - Summer (DST): UTC+2 (CEST)
- Postal code: 281 63
- Website: www.oplany.cz

Oplany is a municipality and village in Prague-East District in the Central Bohemian Region of the Czech Republic. It has about 100 inhabitants.

== History ==
The first written mention of Oplany is from 1379.

== Demographics ==
Historical population
Year	Pop.	±%
1869	372	—
1880	411	+10.5%
1890	416	+1.2%
1900	384	−7.7%
1910	357	−7.0%
1921	335	−6.2%
1930	291	−13.1%
1950	182	−37.5%
1961	161	−11.5%
1970	130	−19.3%
1980	104	−20.0%
1991	75	−27.9%
2001	61	−18.7%
2011	74	+21.3%
2021	101	+36.5%
Source: Censuses
