= Zlatá =

- Municipality
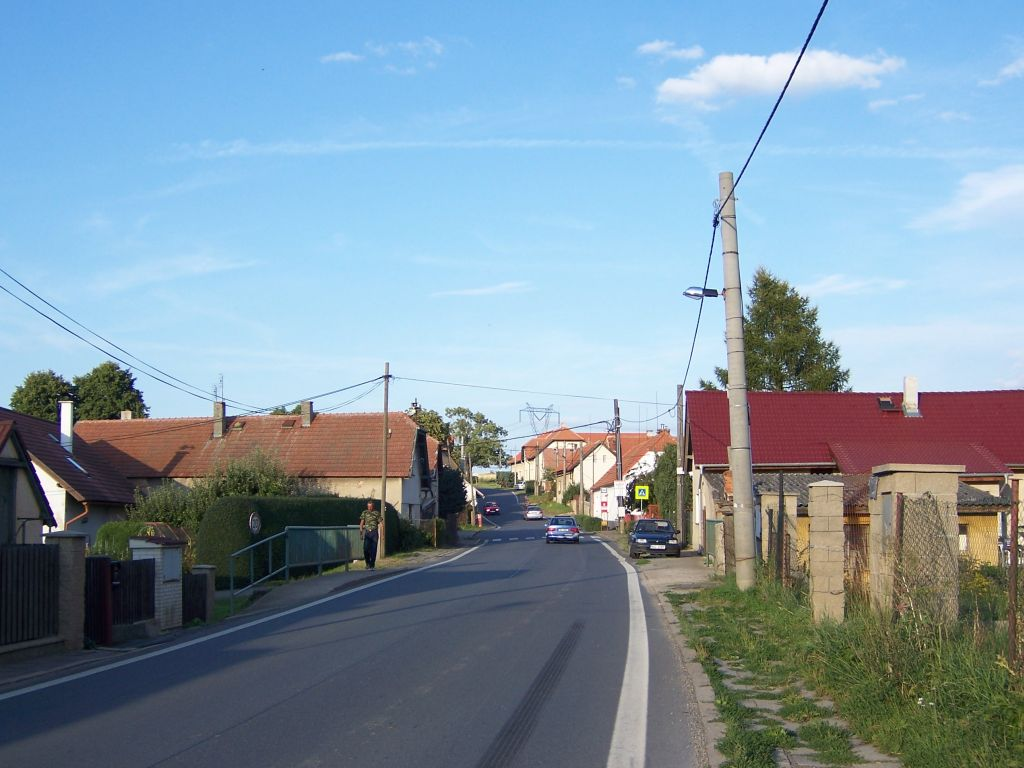
- Main street

- Flag Coat of arms

- Location in the Czech Republic
- Coordinates: 50°2′25″N 14°42′36″E
- Country: Czech Republic
- Region: Central Bohemian
- District: Prague-East
- First mentioned: 1357

Area
  - Total: 1.12 km^{2} (0.43 sq mi)
- Elevation: 307 m (1,007 ft)

Population (2026-01-01)
  - Total: 449
  - Density: 401/km^{2} (1,040/sq mi)
- Time zone: UTC+1 (CET)
  - Summer (DST): UTC+2 (CEST)
- Postal code: 250 83
- Website: www.obeczlata.cz

Zlatá is a municipality and village in Prague-East District in the Central Bohemian Region of the Czech Republic. It has about 400 inhabitants.

== History ==
The first written mention of Zlatá is from 1357.

== Demographics ==
Historical population
Year	Pop.	±%
1869	108	—
1880	128	+18.5%
1890	117	−8.6%
1900	134	+14.5%
1910	129	−3.7%
1921	141	+9.3%
1930	159	+12.8%
1950	115	−27.7%
1961	108	−6.1%
1970	87	−19.4%
1980	84	−3.4%
1991	81	−3.6%
2001	77	−4.9%
2011	235	+205.2%
2021	469	+99.6%
Source: Censuses
