= Pětihosty =

- Municipality
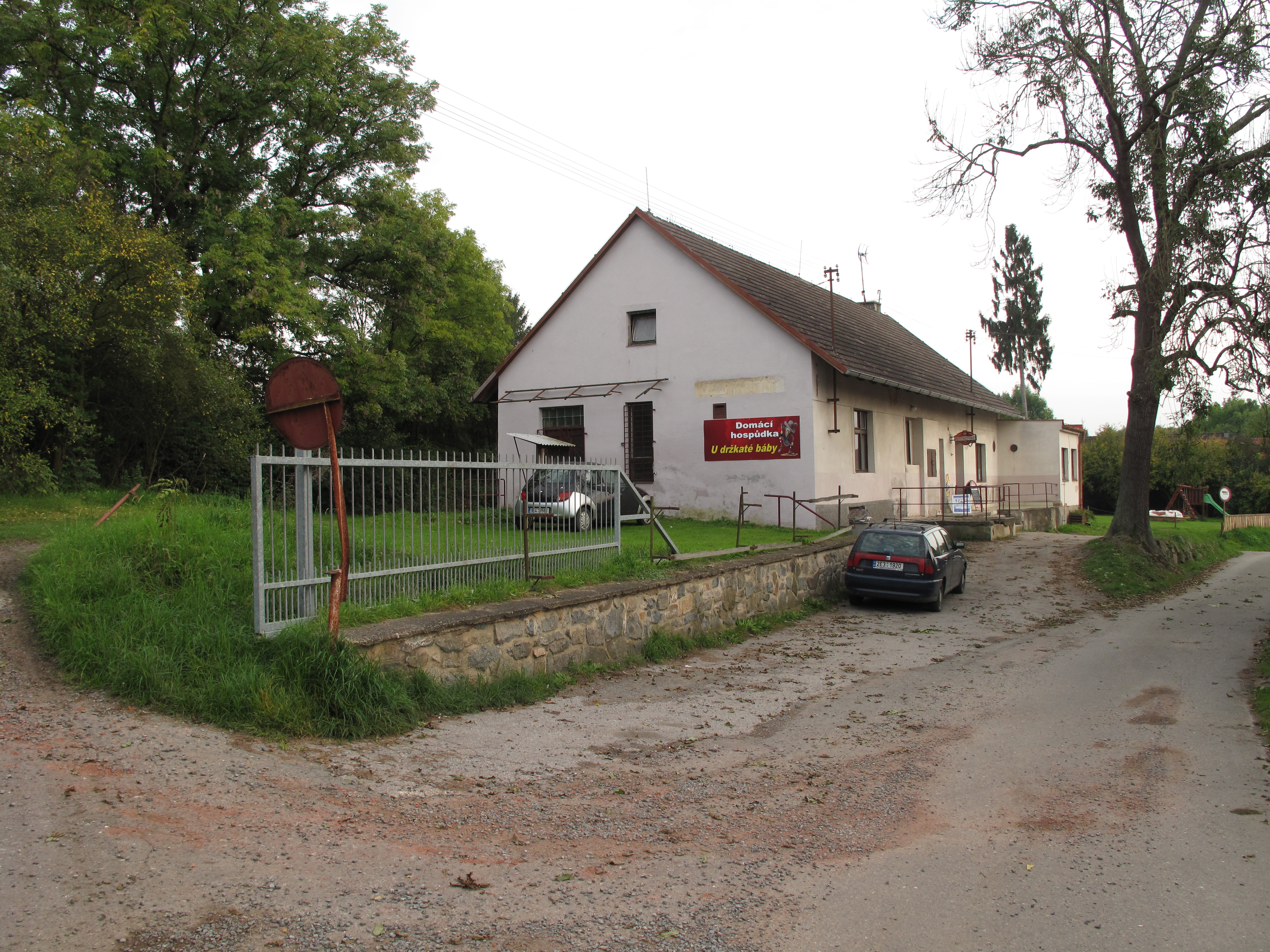
- A pub in Pětihosty

- Location in the Czech Republic
- Coordinates: 49°53′11″N 14°42′20″E
- Country: Czech Republic
- Region: Central Bohemian
- District: Prague-East
- First mentioned: 1371

Area
  - Total: 3.85 km^{2} (1.49 sq mi)
- Elevation: 345 m (1,132 ft)

Population (2026-01-01)
  - Total: 299
  - Density: 77.7/km^{2} (201/sq mi)
- Time zone: UTC+1 (CET)
  - Summer (DST): UTC+2 (CEST)
- Postal code: 251 67
- Website: www.petihosty.cz

Pětihosty (Czech pronunciation: [ˈpjɛcɪɦostɪ]) is a municipality and village in Prague-East District in the Central Bohemian Region of the Czech Republic. It has about 300 inhabitants.

Pětihosty lies approximately 11 kilometres (7 mi) north of Benešov, and 30 km (19 mi) south-east of Prague.

== Demographics ==
Historical population
| Year | Pop. | ±% |
|---|---|---|
| 1869 | 348 | — |
| 1880 | 247 | −29.0% |
| 1890 | 273 | +10.5% |
| 1900 | 267 | −2.2% |
| 1910 | 248 | −7.1% |
| 1921 | 254 | +2.4% |
| 1930 | 247 | −2.8% |
| 1950 | 180 | −27.1% |
| 1961 | 150 | −16.7% |
| 1970 | 136 | −9.3% |
| 1980 | 133 | −2.2% |
| 1991 | 89 | −33.1% |
| 2001 | 98 | +10.1% |
| 2011 | 240 | +144.9% |
| 2021 | 269 | +12.1% |
Source: Censuses
