= Prague-East District =

Prague-East District Okres Praha-východ
- District
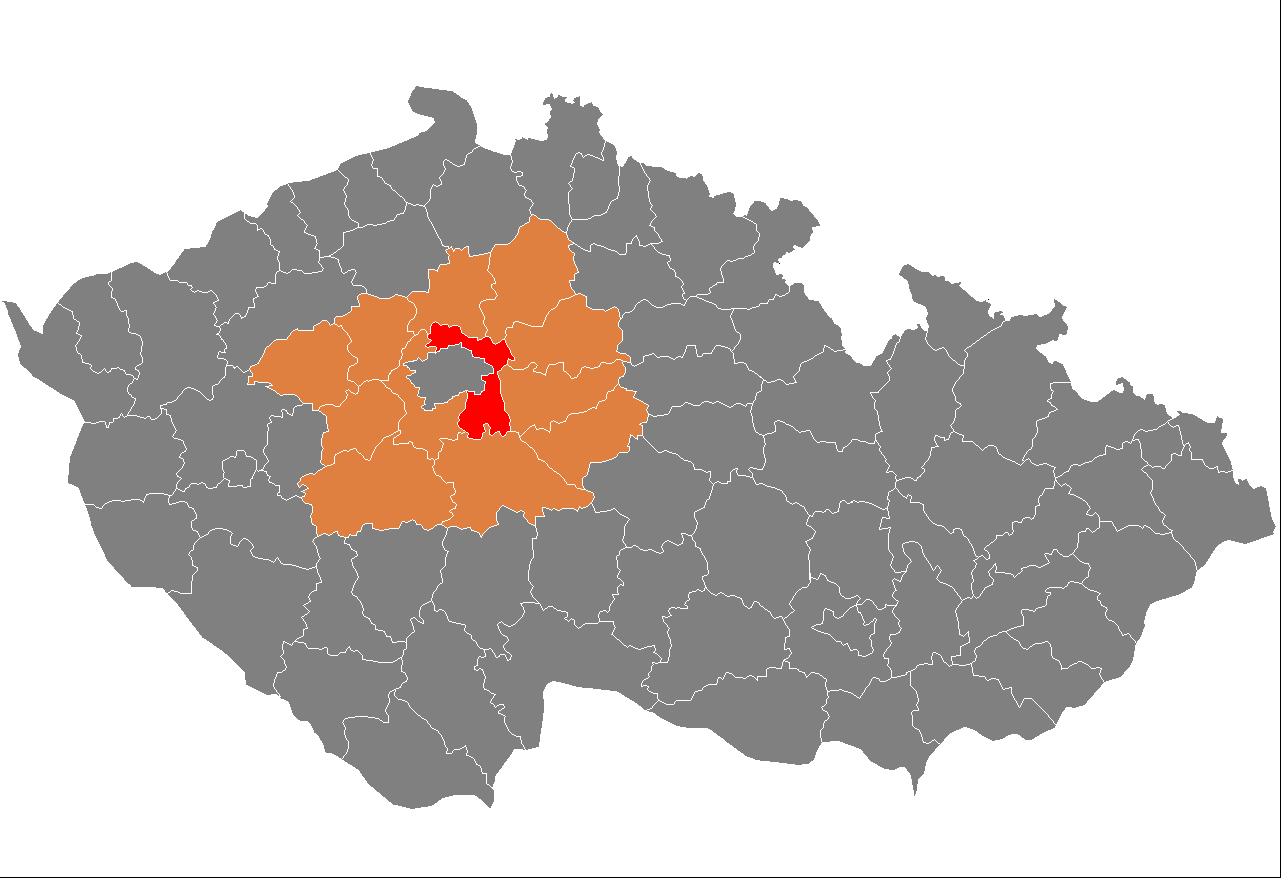
- Location in the Central Bohemian Region within the Czech Republic

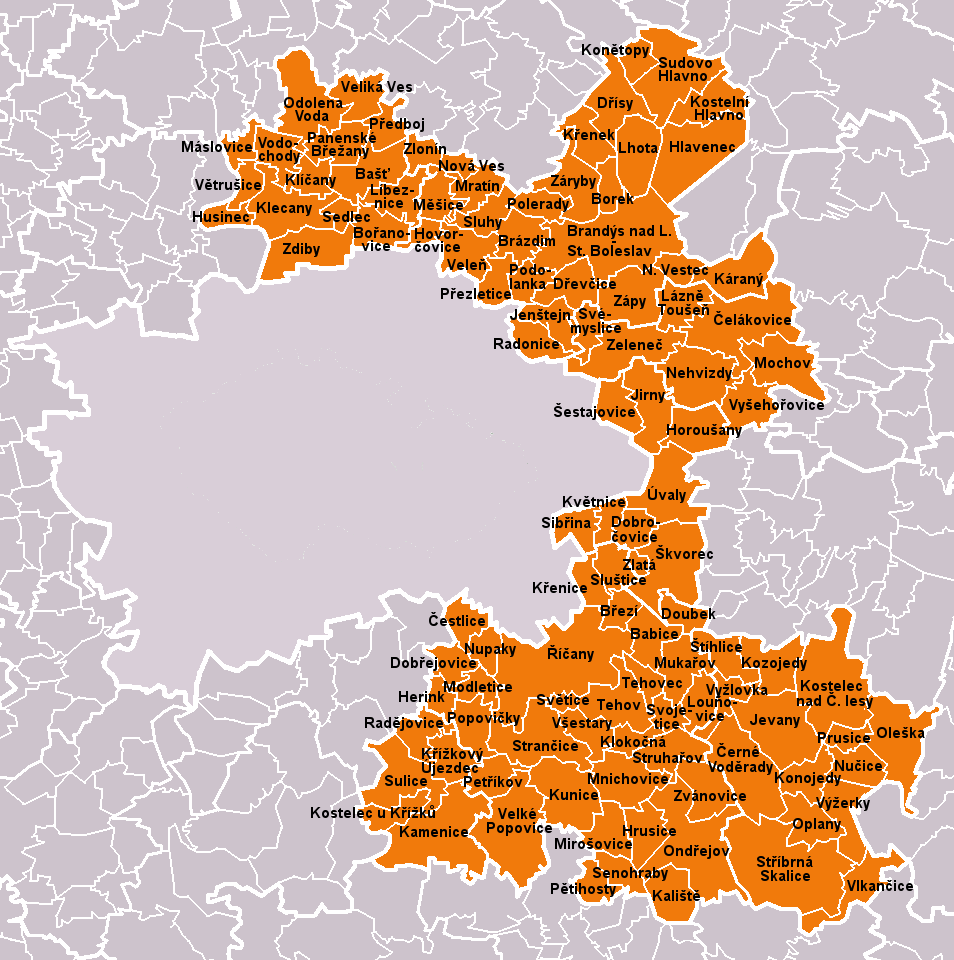
- Coordinates: 50°7′N 14°42′E
- Country: Czech Republic
- Region: Central Bohemian
- Capital: Prague

Area
  - Total: 755.45 km^{2} (291.68 sq mi)

Population (2026)
  - Total: 207,567
  - Density: 274.76/km^{2} (711.62/sq mi)
- Time zone: UTC+1 (CET)
  - Summer (DST): UTC+2 (CEST)
- Municipalities: 110
- * Towns: 8
- * Market towns: 4

Prague-East District (Czech: okres Praha-východ) is a district in the Central Bohemian Region of the Czech Republic. Its capital is Prague. The most populous town of the district is Brandýs nad Labem-Stará Boleslav.

== Administrative division ==
Prague-East District is divided into two administrative districts of municipalities with extended competence: Brandýs nad Labem-Stará Boleslav and Říčany.

=== List of municipalities ===
Towns are marked in bold and market towns in italics:

Babice - Bašť - Borek - Bořanovice - Brandýs nad Labem-Stará Boleslav - Brázdim - Březí - Čelákovice - Černé Voděrady - Čestlice - Dobročovice - Dobřejovice - Doubek - Dřevčice - Dřísy - Herink - Hlavenec - Horoušany - Hovorčovice - Hrusice - Husinec - Jenštejn - Jevany - Jirny - Kaliště - Kamenice - Káraný - Klecany - Klíčany - Klokočná - Konětopy - Konojedy - Kostelec u Křížků - Kostelec nad Černými lesy - Kostelní Hlavno - Kozojedy - Křenek - Křenice - Křížkový Újezdec - Kunice - Květnice - Lázně Toušeň - Lhota - Líbeznice - Louňovice - Máslovice - Měšice - Mirošovice - Mnichovice - Modletice - Mochov - Mratín - Mukařov - Nehvizdy - Nová Ves - Nový Vestec - Nučice - Nupaky - Odolena Voda - Oleška - Ondřejov - Oplany - Panenské Břežany - Pětihosty - Petříkov - Podolanka - Polerady - Popovičky - Předboj - Přezletice - Prusice - Radějovice - Radonice - Říčany - Sedlec - Senohraby - Šestajovice - Sibřina - Škvorec - Sluhy - Sluštice - Strančice - Struhařov - Stříbrná Skalice - Sudovo Hlavno - Sulice - Štíhlice - Svémyslice - Světice - Svojetice - Tehov - Tehovec - Úvaly - Veleň - Veliká Ves - Velké Popovice - Větrušice - Vlkančice - Vodochody - Všestary - Vyšehořovice - Výžerky - Vyžlovka - Zápy - Záryby - Zdiby - Zeleneč - Zlatá - Zlonín - Zvánovice

== Geography ==
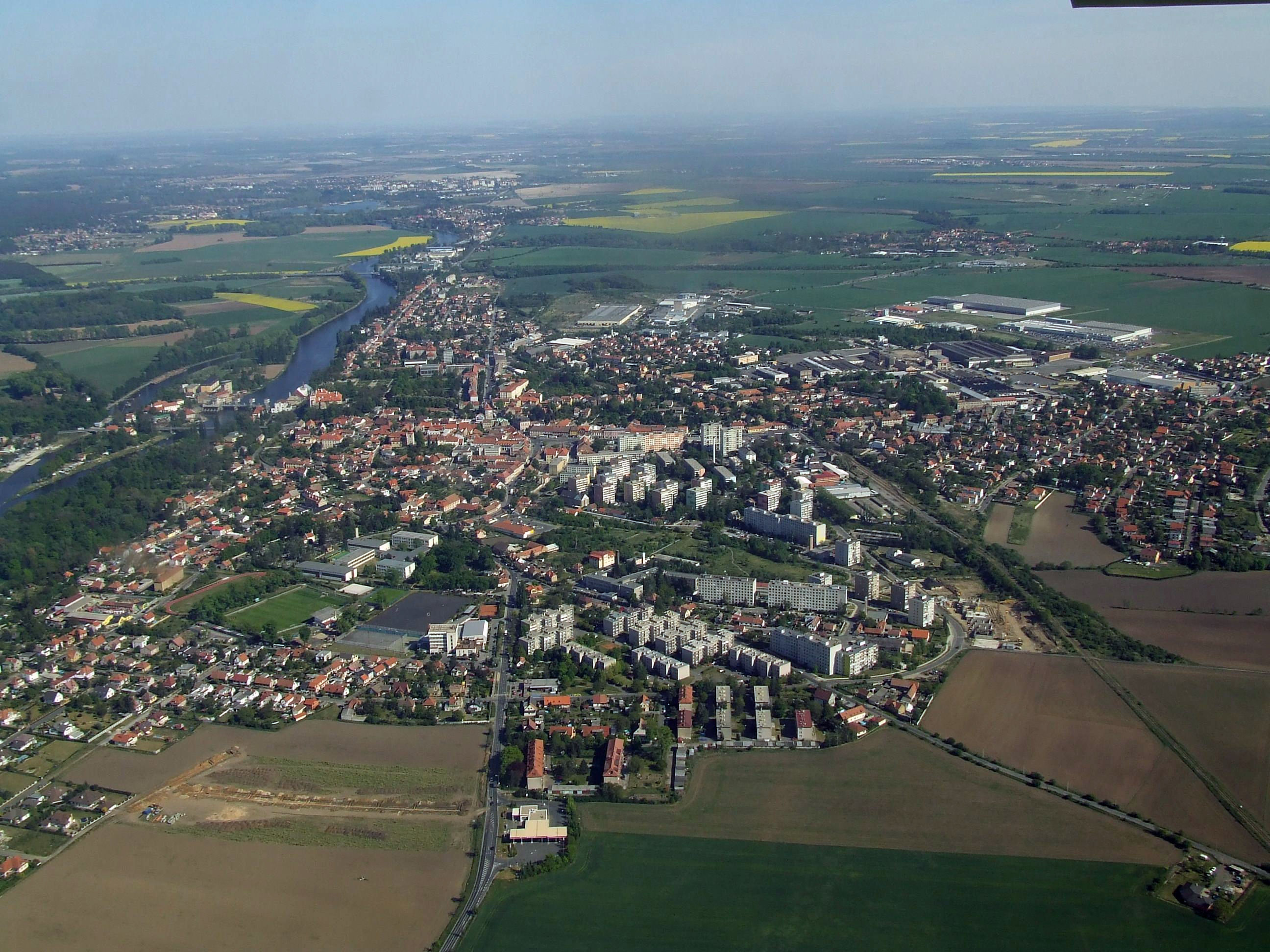
Brandýs nad Labem and surrounding landscape

The territory of the district forms an atypical shape, surrounding Prague from the east. From north to south, the territory measures about 80 km (50 mi), but at its narrowest point it is only 3 km (2 mi) wide. The landscape is rather flat and agricultural, only the southeast is more hilly and forested. It extends into four geomorphological mesoregions: Central Elbe Table (north), Prague Plateau (northwest and central parts), Benešov Uplands (south) and Jizera Table (small northernmost part). The highest point of the district is the hill Pecný in Ondřejov with an elevation of 545 m (1,788 ft), the lowest point is the river bed of the Elbe in Záryby at 165 m (541 ft).

From the total district area of 755.5 km^{2} (291.7 sq mi), agricultural land occupies 476.1 km^{2} (183.8 sq mi), forests occupy 169.9 km^{2} (65.6 sq mi), and water area occupies 12.2 km^{2} (4.7 sq mi). Forests cover 22.5% of the district's area.

The most important river is the Elbe, which flows through the northern part of the district. The Vltava briefly forms the district border in the northwest. The territory is rather poor in bodies of water, the exception is a set of eight ponds on the Jevanský Stream. The largest of them is Jevanský Pond with an area of 22.5 ha (56 acres).

There are no large-scale protected areas.

== Demographics ==
Thanks to its proximity to Prague, Prague-East District belongs to the fastest growing districts in the country in the 21st century.

Historical population

Year	Pop.	±%
1869	68,393	—
1880	73,246	+7.1%
1890	75,187	+2.6%
1900	77,030	+2.5%
1910	83,310	+8.2%

Year	Pop.	±%
1921	83,653	+0.4%
1930	98,661	+17.9%
1950	98,403	−0.3%
1961	104,479	+6.2%
1970	102,934	−1.5%

Year	Pop.	±%
1980	104,796	+1.8%
1991	101,923	−2.7%
2001	105,541	+3.5%
2011	157,146	+48.9%
2021	197,477	+25.7%

Source: Censuses

=== Most populous municipalities ===
Name	Population	Area (km^{2})
Brandýs nad Labem-Stará Boleslav	20,926	23
Říčany	17,314	26
Čelákovice	12,507	16
Úvaly	7,507	11
Odolena Voda	6,639	11
Kamenice	5,307	17
Nehvizdy	4,528	10
Kostelec nad Černými lesy	4,360	18
Šestajovice	4,220	5
Mnichovice	4,206	8

== Economy ==
The largest employers with headquarters in Prague-East District and at least 1,000 employees are:

Economic entity	Location	Number of employees	Main activity
Billa	Modletice	10,000+	Retail sale
Penny Market	Radonice	5,000–9,999	Retail sale
Teta drogerie a lékárny ČR	Šestajovice	3,000–3,999	Retail sale
Mountfield	Mnichovice	1,500–1,999	Retail sale
Aero Vodochody	Odolena Voda	1,500–1,999	Aircraft manufacture
FAST ČR	Říčany	1,500–1,999	Retail sale
PPL CZ	Říčany	1,000–1,499	Postal and courier activities
XLCZ Nábytek	Čestlice	1,000–1,499	Retail sale

== Transport ==
The territory of the district is crossed by several motorways leading from Prague: the D1 motorway to Brno, the D8 motorway to Ústí nad Labem, the D10 motorway to Turnov, and the D11 motorway to Hradec Králové. Small part of the D0 motorway also passes through the district.

== Sights ==
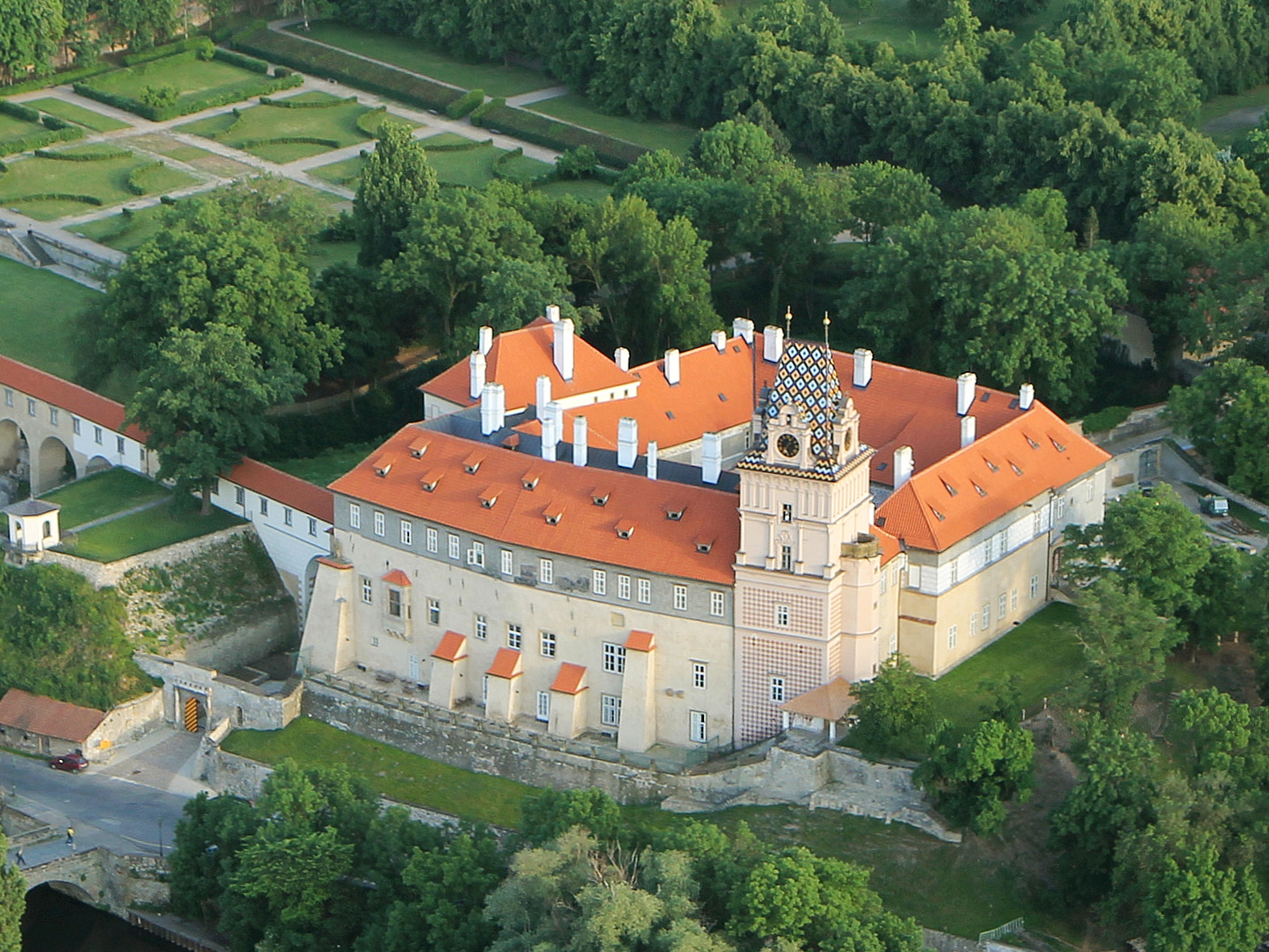
Brandýs nad Labem Castle

The most important monuments in the district, protected as national cultural monuments, (all located in Brandýs nad Labem-Stará Boleslav) are:

- Church of the Assumption of the Virgin Mary
- Church of Saint Wenceslaus and Church of Saint Clement
- Brandýs nad Labem Castle
- Palladium of the Bohemian land in the Church of the Assumption of the Virgin Mary

The best-preserved settlements, protected as monument zones, are:

- Brandýs nad Labem
- Kostelec nad Černými lesy
- Lensedly
- Ondřejov
- Stará Boleslav

The most visited tourist destination and one of the most visited destinations in the entire country is Aquapalace Prague in Čestlice.
