= Klokočná =

- Municipality
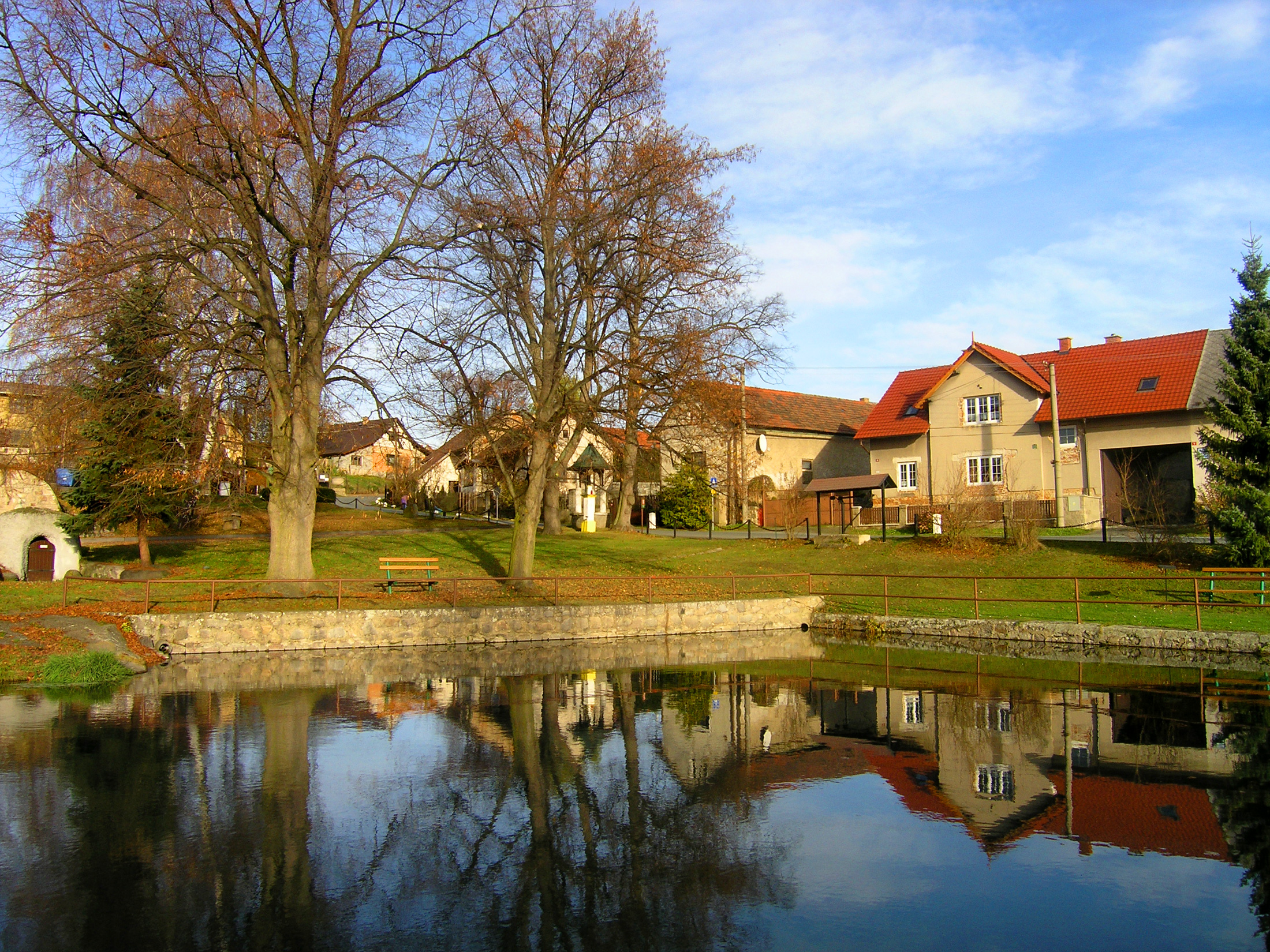
- Centre of Klokočná

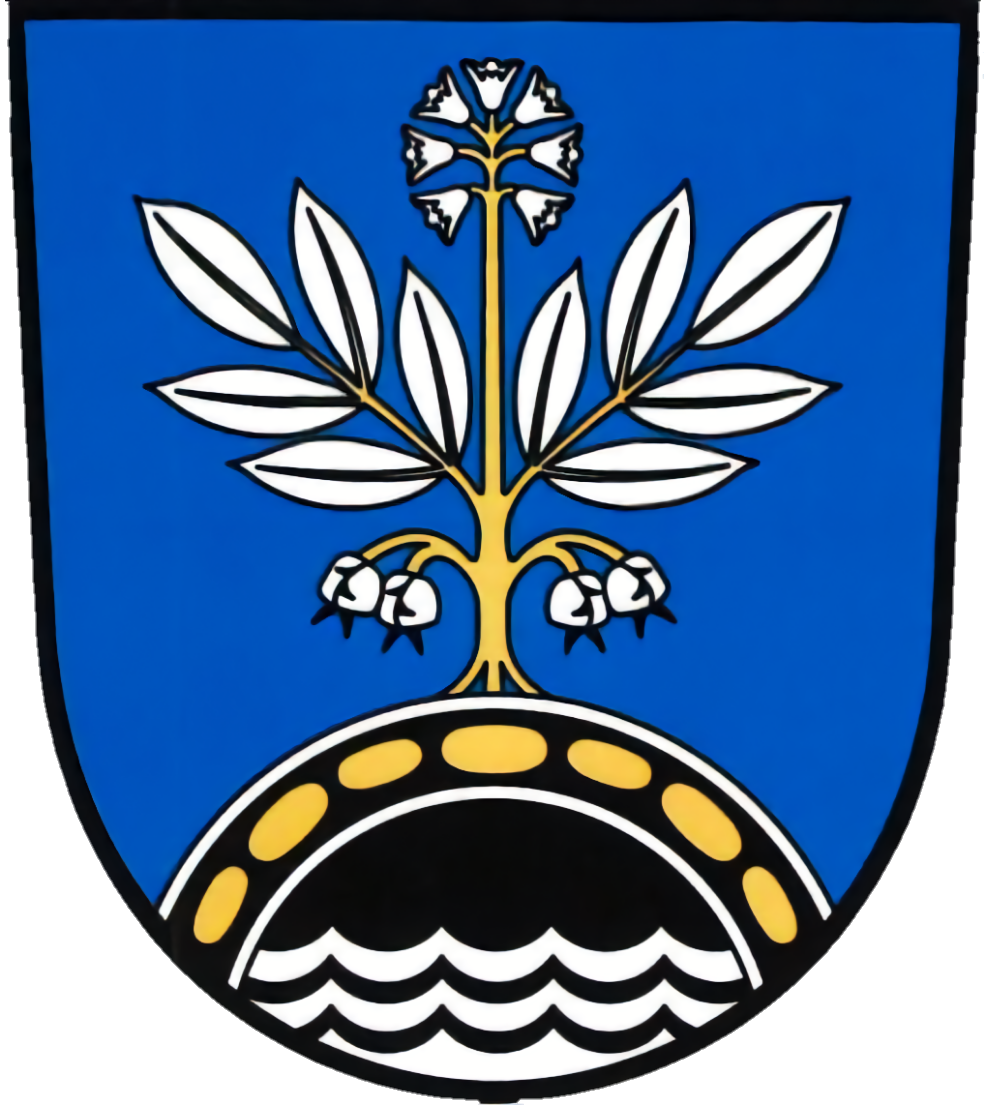
- Flag Coat of arms

- Location in the Czech Republic
- Coordinates: 49°57′31″N 14°43′7″E
- Country: Czech Republic
- Region: Central Bohemian
- District: Prague-East
- First mentioned: 1407

Area
  - Total: 2.84 km^{2} (1.10 sq mi)
- Elevation: 480 m (1,570 ft)

Population (2026-01-01)
  - Total: 312
  - Density: 110/km^{2} (285/sq mi)
- Time zone: UTC+1 (CET)
  - Summer (DST): UTC+2 (CEST)
- Postal code: 251 64
- Website: www.klokocna.eu

Klokočná is a municipality and village in Prague-East District in the Central Bohemian Region of the Czech Republic. It has about 300 inhabitants.

== Demographics ==
Historical population
Year	Pop.	±%
1869	224	—
1880	250	+11.6%
1890	210	−16.0%
1900	208	−1.0%
1910	229	+10.1%
1921	220	−3.9%
1930	219	−0.5%
1950	188	−14.2%
1961	200	+6.4%
1970	163	−18.5%
1980	131	−19.6%
1991	122	−6.9%
2001	154	+26.2%
2011	232	+50.6%
2021	284	+22.4%
Source: Censuses
