= Sluhy =

- Municipality
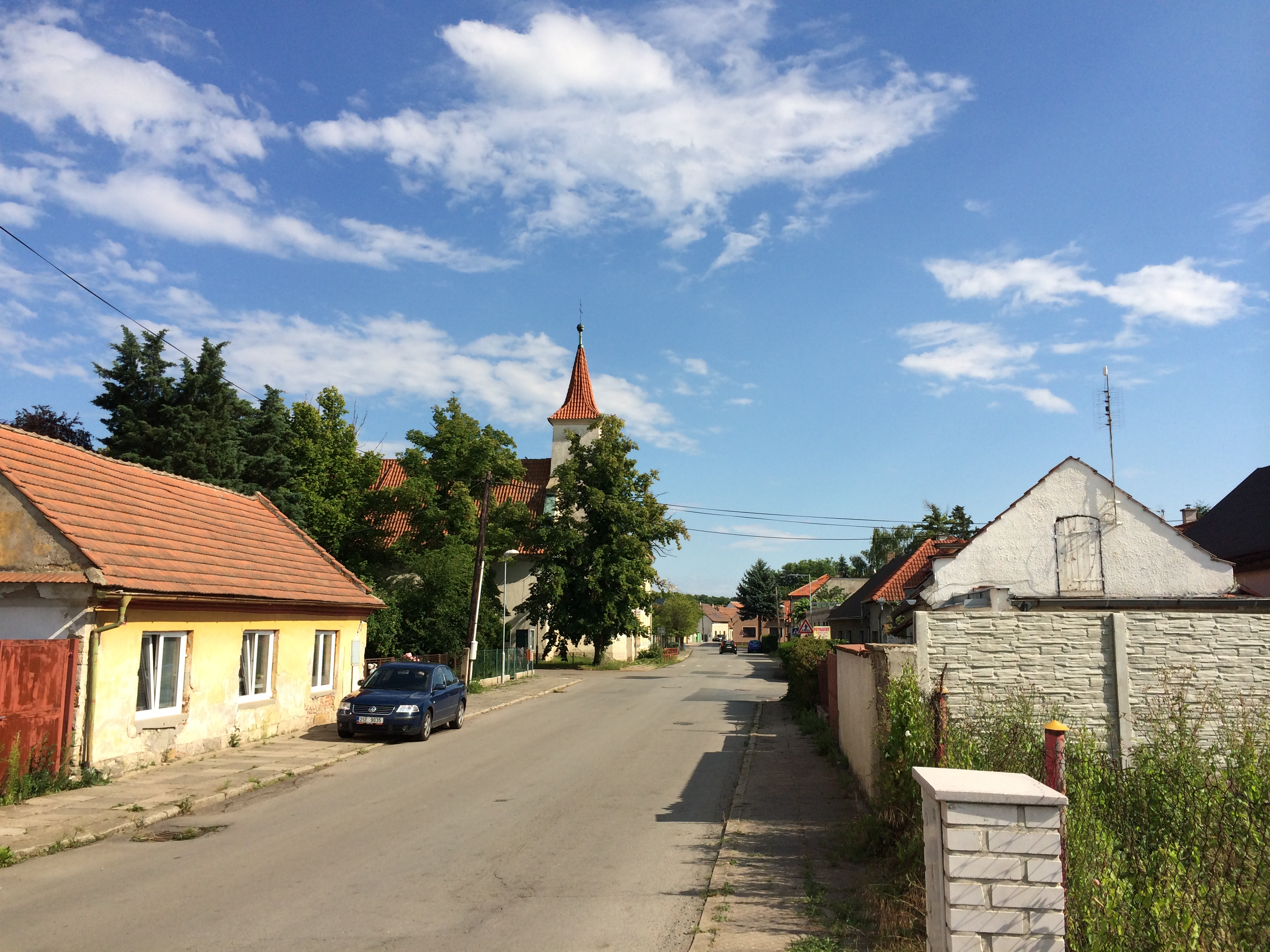
- Road to the Church of Saint Adalbert

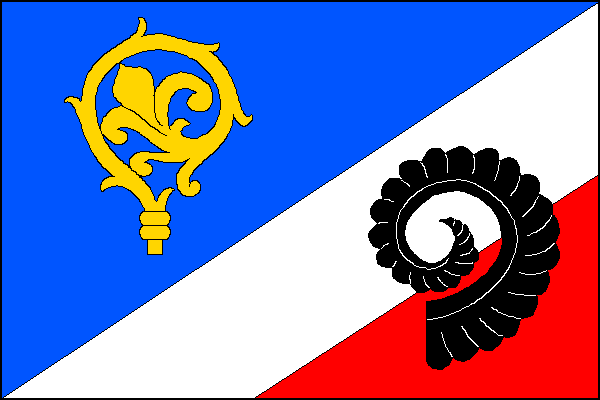
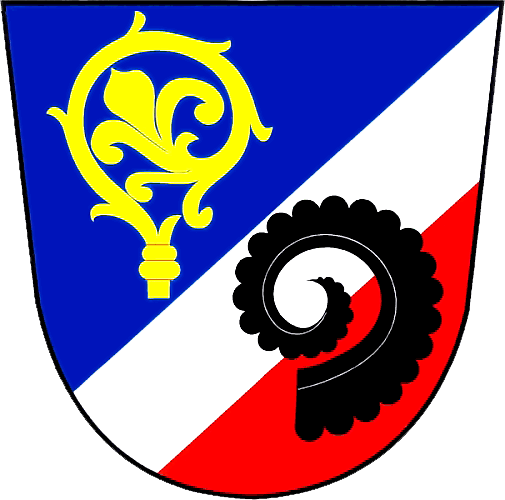
- Flag Coat of arms

- Location in the Czech Republic
- Coordinates: 50°11′33″N 14°33′28″E
- Country: Czech Republic
- Region: Central Bohemian
- District: Prague-East
- First mentioned: 1238

Area
  - Total: 4.56 km^{2} (1.76 sq mi)
- Elevation: 184 m (604 ft)

Population (2026-01-01)
  - Total: 743
  - Density: 163/km^{2} (422/sq mi)
- Time zone: UTC+1 (CET)
  - Summer (DST): UTC+2 (CEST)
- Postal code: 250 63
- Website: sluhy.cz

Sluhy is a municipality and village in Prague-East District in the Central Bohemian Region of the Czech Republic. It has about 700 inhabitants.

== Etymology ==
The name is derived either from the word sluha ('servant'), meaning "the village of servants", or from the personal name Sluha, meaning "the village of Sluhas (Sluha's family)".

== Geography ==
Sluhy is located about 8 kilometres (5 mi) north of Prague. It lies in a flat agricultural landscape in the Central Elbe Table. The stream Mratínský potok flows through the municipality.

== History ==
The first written mention of Sluhy is from 1238, however the existence of the Church of Saint Adalbert in the village is documented already between 967 and 999.

== Demographics ==
Historical population

Year	Pop.	±%
1869	589	—
1880	706	+19.9%
1890	737	+4.4%
1900	655	−11.1%
1910	692	+5.6%

Year	Pop.	±%
1921	680	−1.7%
1930	757	+11.3%
1950	646	−14.7%
1961	666	+3.1%
1970	614	−7.8%

Year	Pop.	±%
1980	634	+3.3%
1991	596	−6.0%
2001	634	+6.4%
2011	680	+7.3%
2021	724	+6.5%

Source: Censuses

== Transport ==
There are no railways or major roads passing through the municipality.

== Sights ==
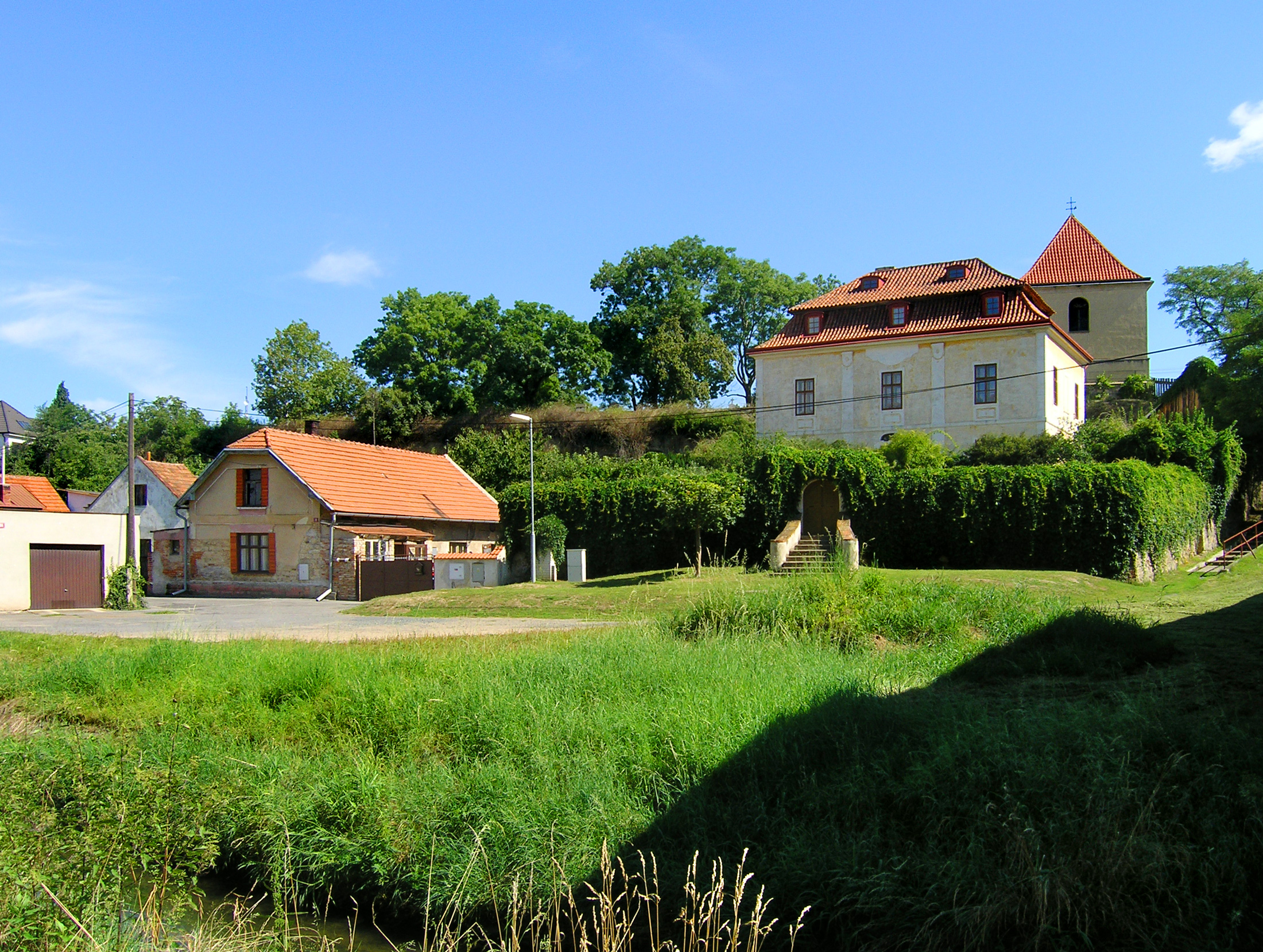
The presbytery with the bell tower

The main landmark of Sluhy is the Church of Saint Adalbert. It was originally a Romanesque building, which was rebuilt in the Gothic style in 1270. Its current appearance is from the 18th century, when late Baroque improvements were made.

The prismatic bell tower is a Baroque building from the 16th century. It originally included three bells, but one was stolen. Next to the bell tower is located the former presbytery. It was built in 1780.
