= Dřevčice =

- Municipality
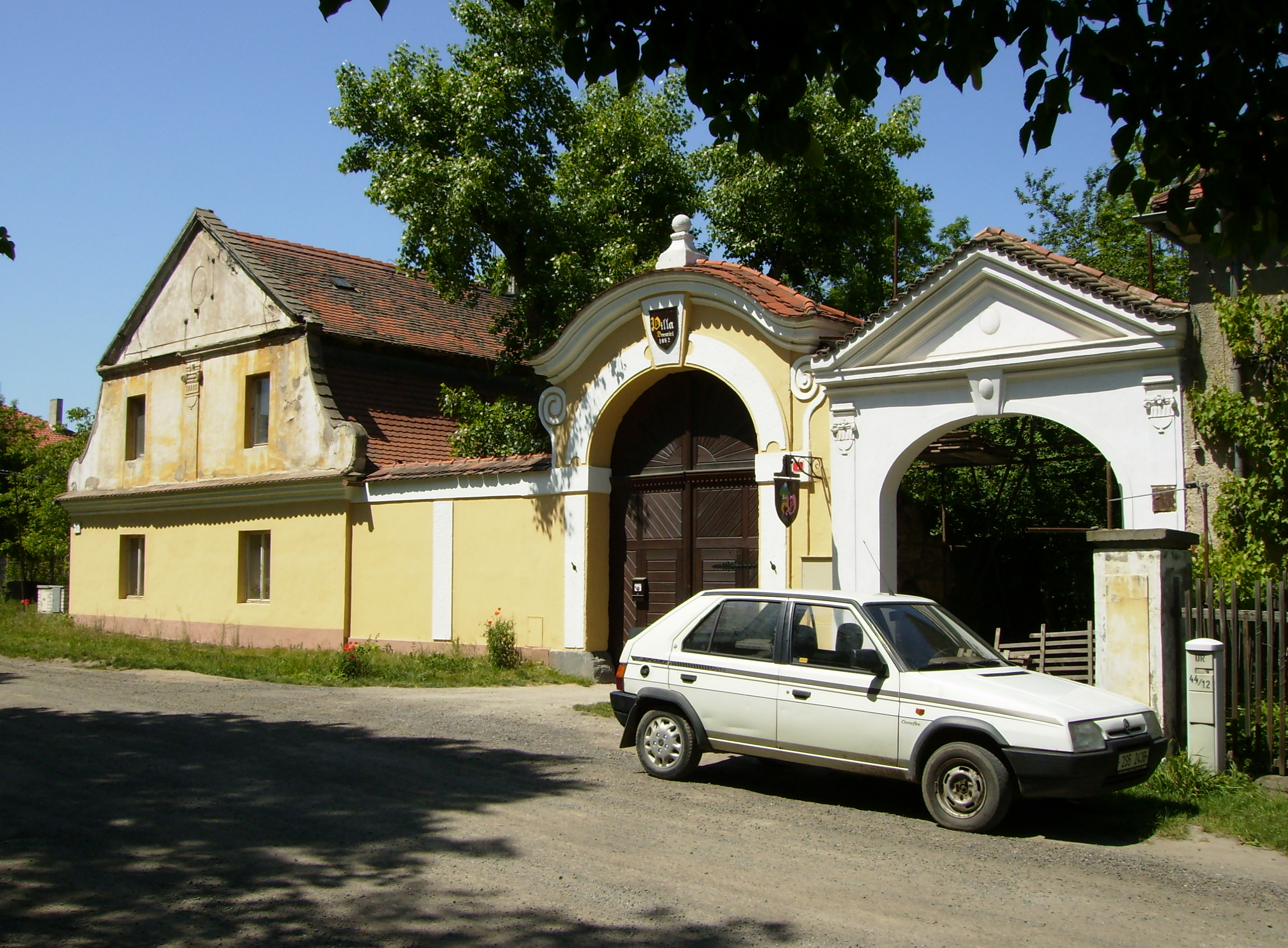
- Historical farmhouse

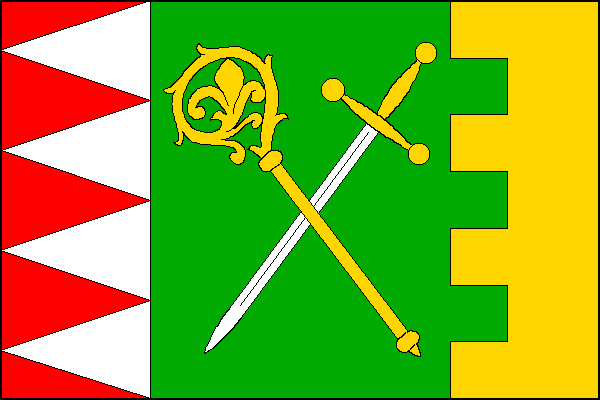
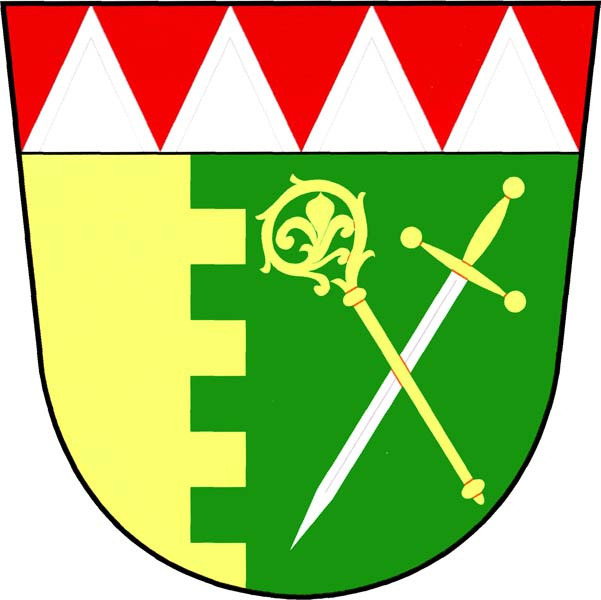
- Flag Coat of arms

- Location in the Czech Republic
- Coordinates: 50°10′4″N 14°37′42″E
- Country: Czech Republic
- Region: Central Bohemian
- District: Prague-East
- First mentioned: 1052

Area
  - Total: 5.62 km^{2} (2.17 sq mi)
- Elevation: 225 m (738 ft)

Population (2026-01-01)
  - Total: 764
  - Density: 136/km^{2} (352/sq mi)
- Time zone: UTC+1 (CET)
  - Summer (DST): UTC+2 (CEST)
- Postal code: 250 01
- Website: www.drevcice.cz

Dřevčice is a municipality and village in Prague-East District in the Central Bohemian Region of the Czech Republic. It has about 800 inhabitants.

== Demographics ==
Historical population
Year	Pop.	±%
1869	306	—
1880	311	+1.6%
1890	384	+23.5%
1900	386	+0.5%
1910	419	+8.5%
1921	429	+2.4%
1930	583	+35.9%
1950	427	−26.8%
1961	545	+27.6%
1970	541	−0.7%
1980	509	−5.9%
1991	454	−10.8%
2001	467	+2.9%
2011	817	+74.9%
2021	874	+7.0%
Source: Censuses
