= Lhota (Prague-East District) =

- Municipality
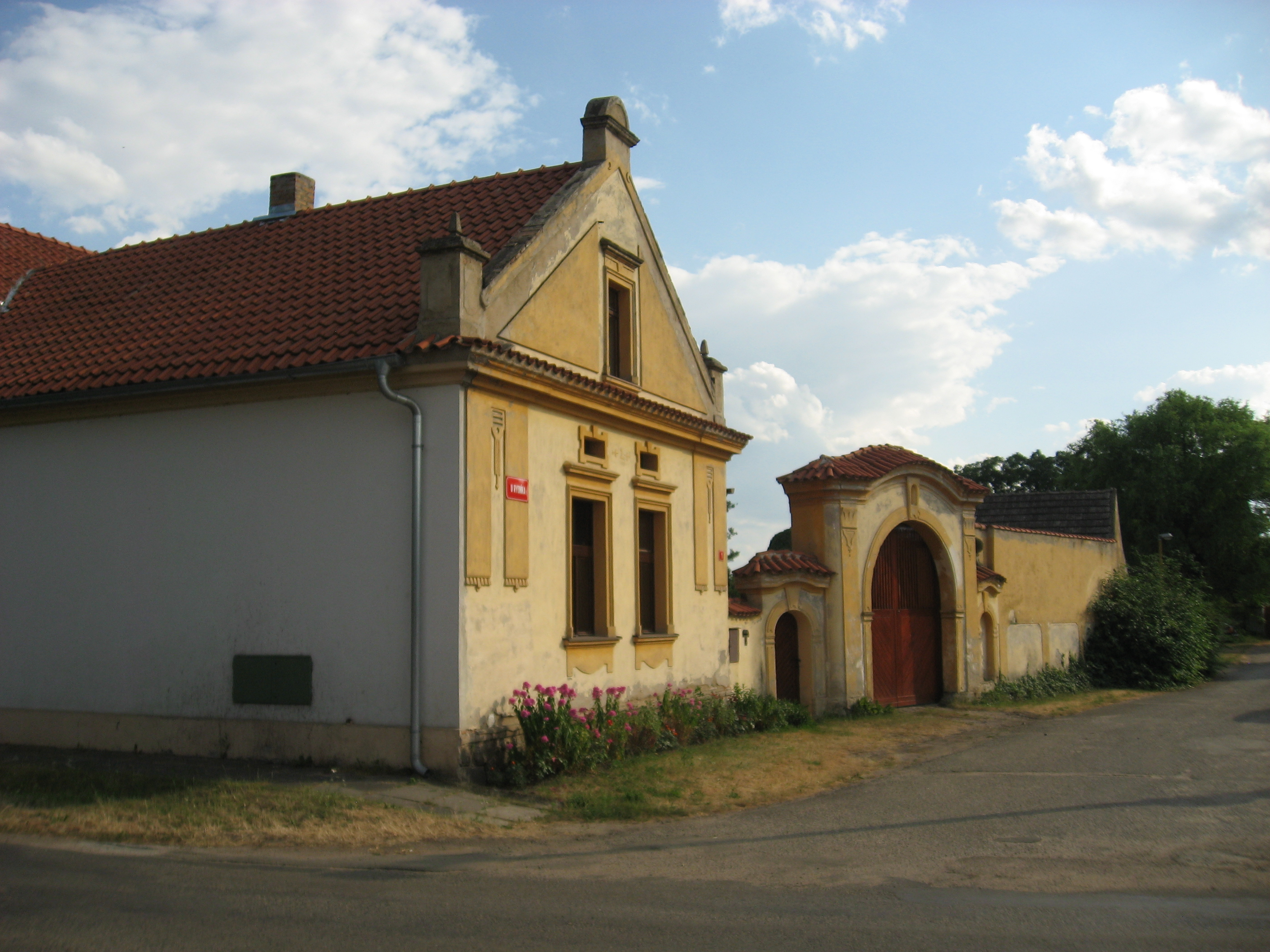
- A farmstead in Lhota

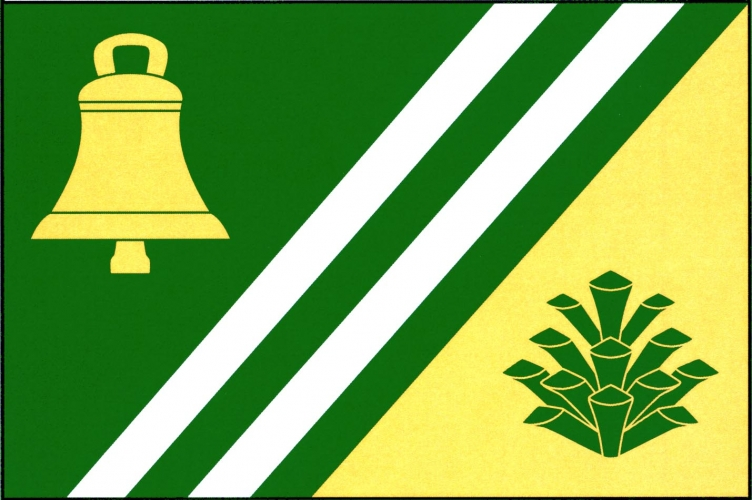
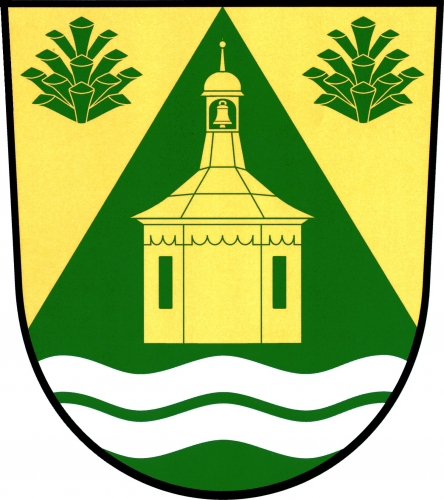
- Flag Coat of arms

- Location in the Czech Republic
- Coordinates: 50°14′36″N 14°39′23″E
- Country: Czech Republic
- Region: Central Bohemian
- District: Prague-East
- First mentioned: 1332

Area
  - Total: 7.96 km^{2} (3.07 sq mi)
- Elevation: 172 m (564 ft)

Population (2026-01-01)
  - Total: 548
  - Density: 68.8/km^{2} (178/sq mi)
- Time zone: UTC+1 (CET)
  - Summer (DST): UTC+2 (CEST)
- Postal code: 277 14
- Website: www.lhotanadlabem.cz

Lhota is a municipality and village in Prague-East District in the Central Bohemian Region of the Czech Republic. It has about 500 inhabitants.

== Demographics ==
Historical population
Year	Pop.	±%
1869	301	—
1880	302	+0.3%
1890	356	+17.9%
1900	376	+5.6%
1910	396	+5.3%
1921	355	−10.4%
1930	373	+5.1%
1950	420	+12.6%
1961	472	+12.4%
1970	401	−15.0%
1980	397	−1.0%
1991	359	−9.6%
2001	311	−13.4%
2011	457	+46.9%
2021	494	+8.1%
Source: Censuses
