= Struhařov (Prague-East District) =

- Municipality
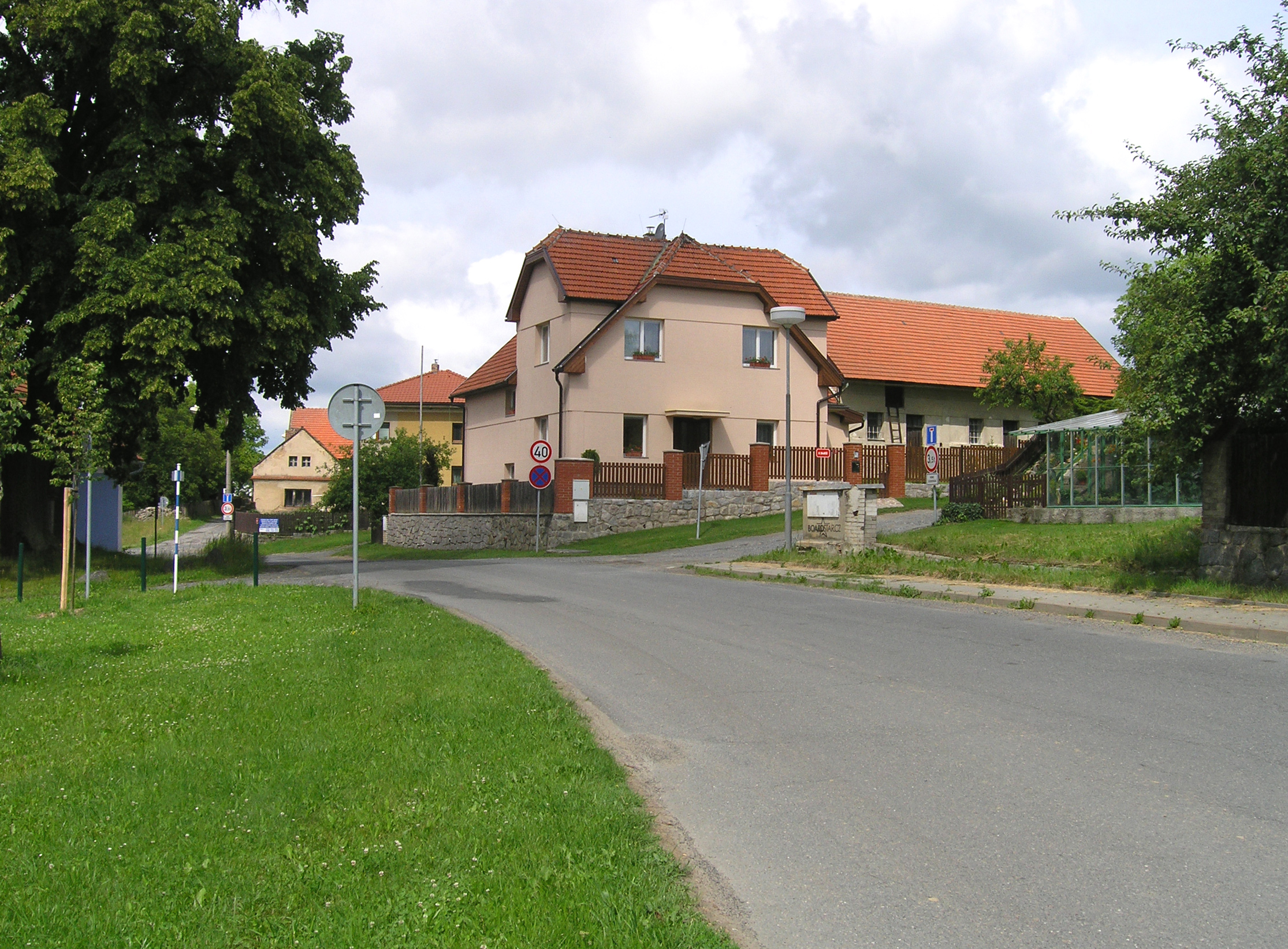
- Common in Struhařov

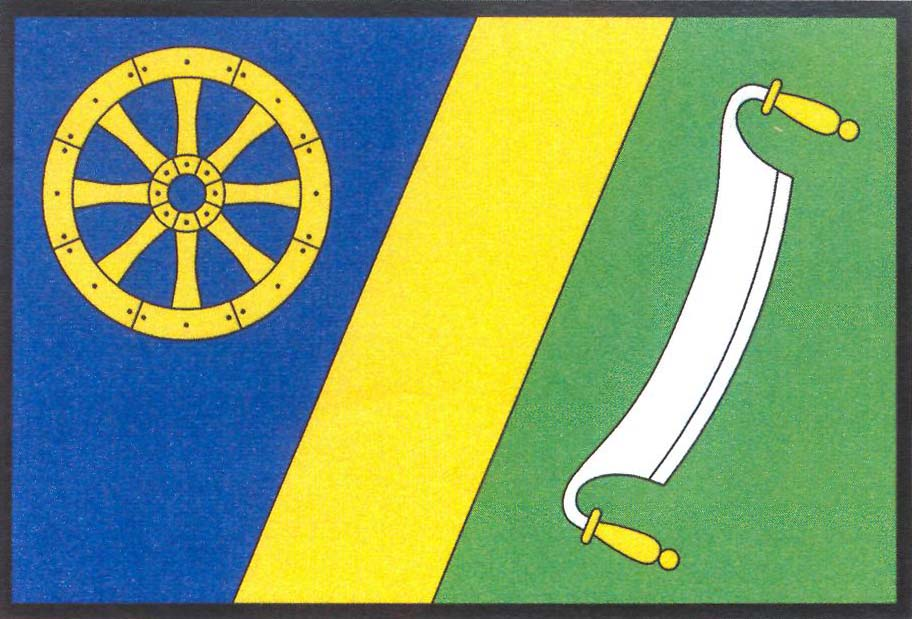
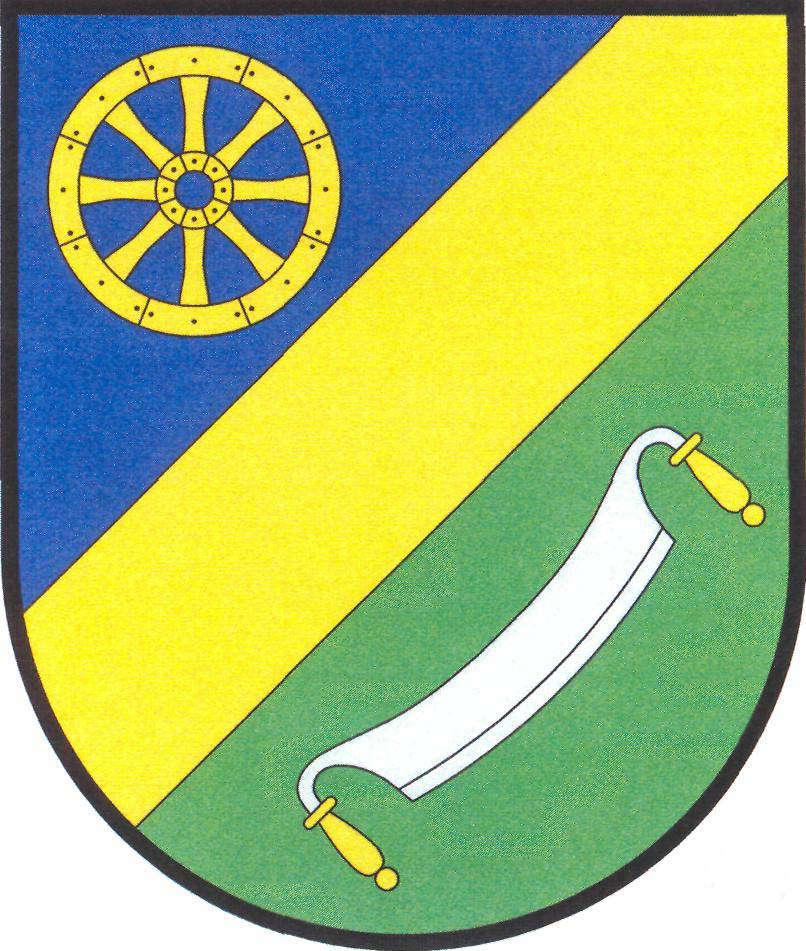
- Flag Coat of arms

- Location in the Czech Republic
- Coordinates: 49°57′7″N 14°44′40″E
- Country: Czech Republic
- Region: Central Bohemian
- District: Prague-East
- First mentioned: 1397

Area
  - Total: 5.78 km^{2} (2.23 sq mi)
- Elevation: 475 m (1,558 ft)

Population (2026-01-01)
  - Total: 1,024
  - Density: 177/km^{2} (459/sq mi)
- Time zone: UTC+1 (CET)
  - Summer (DST): UTC+2 (CEST)
- Postal code: 251 64
- Website: www.struharov.cz

Struhařov is a municipality and village in Prague-East District in the Central Bohemian Region of the Czech Republic. It has about 1,000 inhabitants.

== History ==
The first written mention of Struhařov is from 1397.

== Demographics ==
Historical population
Year	Pop.	±%
1869	354	—
1880	383	+8.2%
1890	404	+5.5%
1900	385	−4.7%
1910	400	+3.9%
1921	375	−6.2%
1930	428	+14.1%
1950	485	+13.3%
1961	535	+10.3%
1970	513	−4.1%
1980	473	−7.8%
1991	461	−2.5%
2001	513	+11.3%
2011	675	+31.6%
2021	1,003	+48.6%
Source: Censuses
