= Jankovský of Vlašim =

Czech noble family

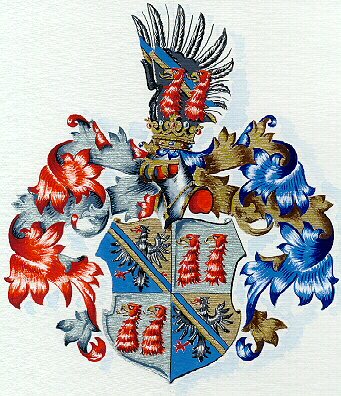
Coat of Arms of the Jankovský z Vlašimi family (1755)

Jankovský z Vlašimi is an old Czech family and a member of the House of Vlašim. In the 13th century at Jankov in Bohemia, the family began to split into several branches.

== History ==
Early history in Bohemia

First listed was Markvart z Vlašimi of the House of Vlašim. Other members from the House of Vlasim were Leva z Jankova of the Castle Chřenovice and Jan z Kamenice, the father of Cardinal Jan Očko z Vlašime. Markvart's sons were Maršík, Jaroš and Hynek.

Maršík and Jaroš were followers of John of Luxembourg and were knighted on the battlefield in 1325. Maršík died on the battlefield at Mailberk in Tirol, Austria in 1332. Hron z Vlašimi, son of Maršík, died with King John of Bohemia at the Battle of Crécy in 1346 fighting Edward, The Black Prince.

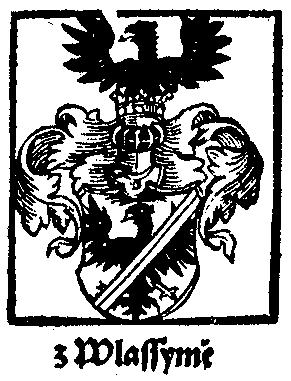
Coat of Arms z Vlašimě of Jankov and Vlašim c1318

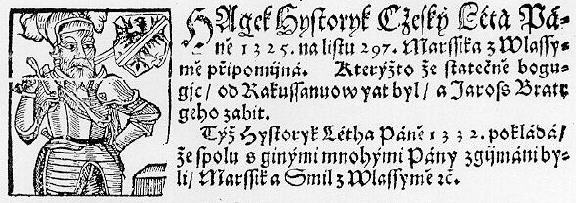
History of Maršík and Jaroš z Vlašimě, Knighted in 1325

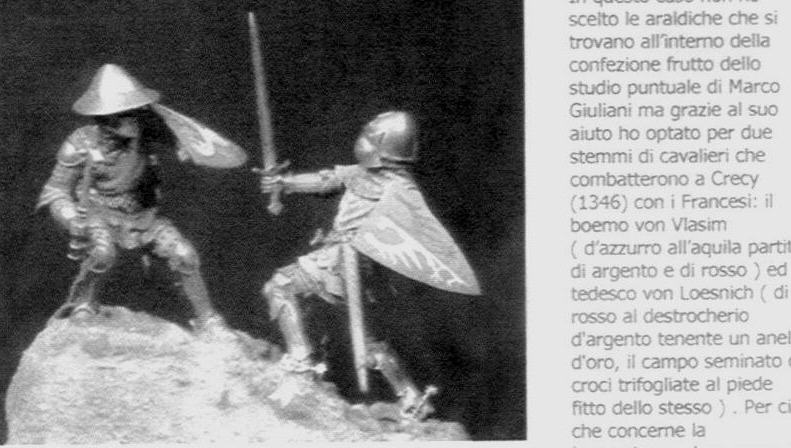
History of Hron von Vlasim at Battle of Crécy in 1346

Hynek z Vlašimi (+1349) and his sons Hynek II (+1354) and Benes (+1363) ruled Jankov and Vlašim from 1318 until 1363. Vlašim was sold in 1363 to Michael z Vlašimě of Castle Svojanov, who was the brother of Jan Očko z Vlašimě. Benes' sons were Ceč, Benes II and Hynek III Jankovský z Vlašimi. The family then split into 3 branches.

Ceč Jankovských z Vlašimi (+1392) established a new family line at Nemyčeves in northern Bohemia. In 1488, Vaclav z Nemyčevsi was Castellan of Prague Castle and later Marshall to King Vladislaus II of Bohemia and Hungary. The family line z Nemyčevsi ended with the death of Václavův Sigmund z Nemyčevsi in 1513.

Benes II Jankovských z Vlašimi (+1404) ruled Jankov until 1385 and then established a new family line at Tuř in northern Bohemia. The family line z Tuři ended with the death of Petr z Tuři in 1450.

Hynek III (+1365) and his son Matěj ruled at Horní Cerekev in 1360. Matěj Jankovští z Vlašimi (+1397) then ruled at Jankov.

Northern Moravia 1390–1520

Jan Jankovský z Vlašimi, son of Matěj, moved to Moravia in 1390, was made a member of the Land Court in 1405 and was given the Castle Úsov in northern Moravia in 1416 for his services by Wenceslaus, King of the Romans. Jan Jankovský z Vlašimi's (+1420) wife was Markéta, and they had sons Václav, Karl and Jan II. The family then split into 2 branches.

Vaclav (+1463) and Karl (+1475), sons of Jan Jankovský z Vlašimi, ruled at the Castle Úsov, established the new family line z Úsovský and adopted the old coat of arms of the two red vultures heads of the House of Vlašim. In 1440 the family acquired the Royal Town of Litovel and in 1496 they acquired the Castle Sobotín. Jiří z Úsovský, in the years 1516–1520, was made Vice-Chamberlain of Moravian Margraviate by King Louis II of Hungary and Bohemia. Jiří (†1520) only had daughters and the Úsov estates were given to his grandson Kryštof z Boskovic. His granddaughters Anna and Katerina z Boskovic married brothers Karl and Maximilian of the Princely family of Liechtenstein.

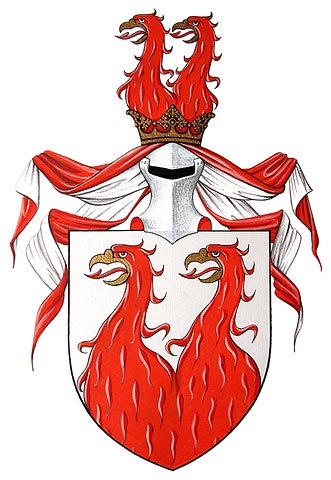
Coat of Arms of family z Usovský 1480-1520

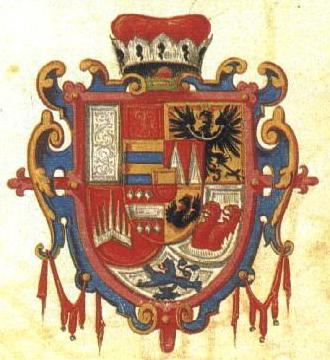
Coat of Arms of Prince Karel of Liechtenstein with z Usovský 1614

Southern Moravia 1435–1752

Jan II Jankovský z Vlašimi married into the family z Kunštátu, sold the estates at Jankov in 1418 and established the family line Jankovský z Vlašimi at Jevišovice and Slatina in southern Moravia. In 1511, Jindřich Jankovský z Vlašimi of Castle Rešice, grandson of Jan II Jankovský z Vlašimi, was recognized by King Vladislaus II of Bohemia on September 14, 1511.

In 1522, Jan, Petr, Mikuláš and Hynek of Slatina, Kyjovice, Plaveč and Slavětice, who were the sons of Jindřich Jankovský z Vlašimi of Castle Rešice, were recognized by King Louis II of Hungary and Bohemia on August 2, 1522.

In 1615, brothers Fridrich and Volf Zikmund Jankovský z Vlašimi of the Bítov branch and brothers Adam and Jiřík Jankovský z Vlašimi of the Rešice branch were ennobled with hereditary titles of Lord by Matthias, Holy Roman Emperor, and received a new coat of arms with the black eagle and the two red vulture heads of the House of Vlašim on December 24, 1615.

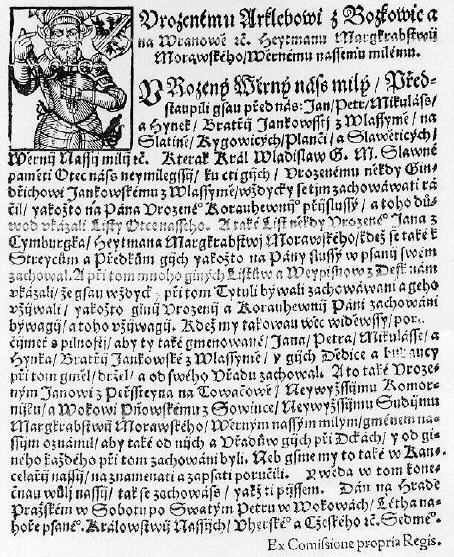
Recognition of Nobility by King Louis II of Bohemia 1522

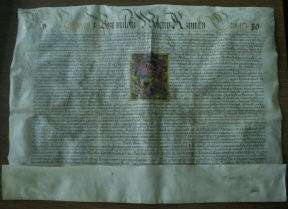
Ennoblement Document from Matthias, Holy Roman Emperor 1615

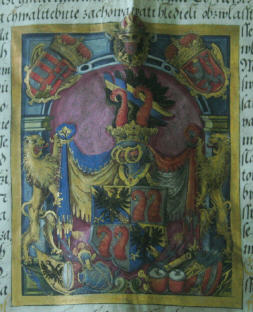
Formal Coat of Arms of Jankovský z Vlašimi 1615

Fridrich Jankovský z Vlašimi was the Moravian Hofrychtéř. He was Catholic, and sided with the Holy Roman Empire during the Thirty Years' War. He acquired the Royal Town of Jemnice in 1628 as reward. Volf Zikmund was one of the Moravian Directors. A Calvinist, he sided with a defeated uprising and was sentenced to a loss of honor and all property. He died in 1622.

Hynek Jankovský z Vlašimi, son of Fridrich, became Imperial Counsel to Ferdinand III, Holy Roman Emperor. Maxmilian Arnošt II Jankovský z Vlašimi was a good friend of Joseph I, Holy Roman Emperor. The Bitov family line ended with the death of Maxmilian Arnošt II Jankovský z Vlašimi in 1736. His daughter Countess Marie Johanka von Vlasching married Jan Josef, Count of Kounice, and her sister Marie Anna married Heindrich von Daun.

The family at Rešice after Jiřik Jankovský z Vlašimi was followed by Jindřich, who founded new line at Castle Rešice. Jindřich's wife was Ludmila z Lažan. Her son Karl Václav Jankovský z Vlašimi (1644–1684) lived for a time at the court of King Karl X Gustav of Sweden.

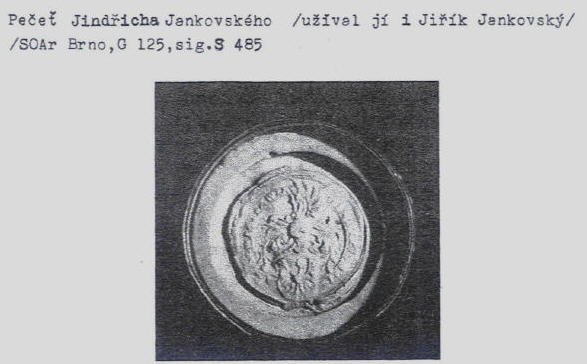
Seal of Jiřik and Jindřich Jankovský of Rešice before 1615

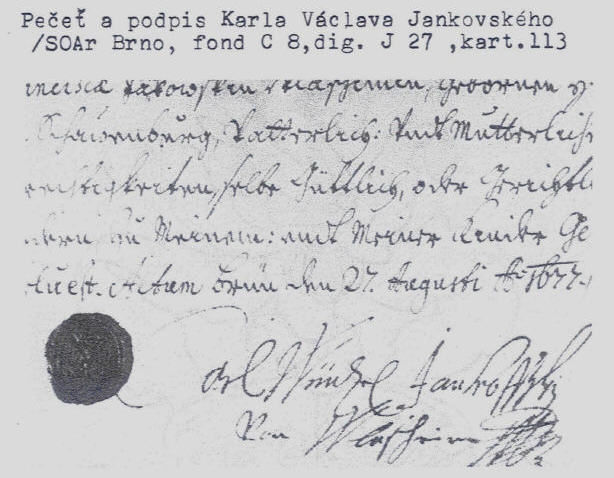
Seal of Karl Václav Jankovský of Rešice 1677

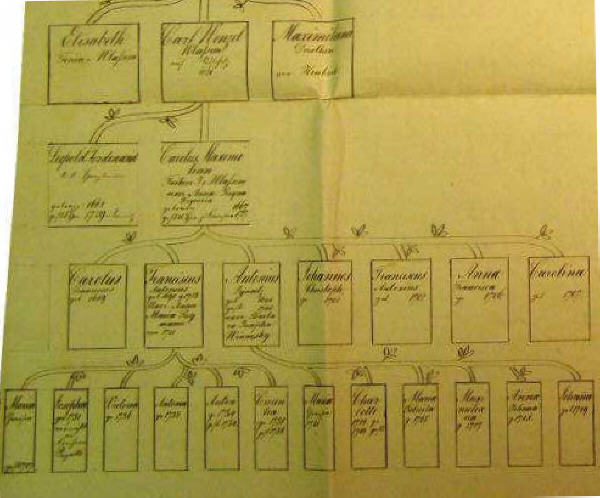
Pedigree of Barons at Rešice with listing of orphans 1755

History after the year 1752

Antonín (1690–1752), brother of Jan Antonín Jankovský z Vlašimi (1695–1740), resided in the King's Tribunal was able to claim the Bítov estates for the families in 1752. But František died a few months after the Tribunal and the children of the two brothers became orphans. In 1755, Empress Maria Theresa of Austria awarded the Bítov estates to Austrian relatives, the family vonDaun.

Jan Václav Jankovský z Vlašimi (1729–1775), orphan son of Jan Antonín (1695–1740), was a military leader during the Seven Years' War. Jan Václav's wife was from the Prussian family von Mayenn and they had two sons Karl, and Jan Matious. The family again split into 2 branches.

In Moravia, Karl and his son Franz continued the family's tradition of military service. Colonel Franz Jankovsky von Mayenhorst (1807–1860) moved his family to Austria. His daughter Anna Jankovsky von Mayenhorst married Baron Wilhelm von Kralik jr in 1862.

In Bohemia, Jan Matious continued the family line. In 1789 the family was listed Soupis Královských Svobodníků (List of royal freemen). His daughter Barbara married Baron Franz von Raule in 1829. In the late 1800s, the remaining family moved from Bohemia with grandson John Jankovský (1845–1944), establishing a new family line in America.

Senior members of the family, Thomas Joseph and William Otto, made a return visit to Bohemia and Moravia in 2005 and 2007 and were honored during their visit to Bítov Castle.

== Coat of arms ==
Jankovští z Vlašime before the year 1615

Jankovský z Vlašimi after the year 1615

== Books ==
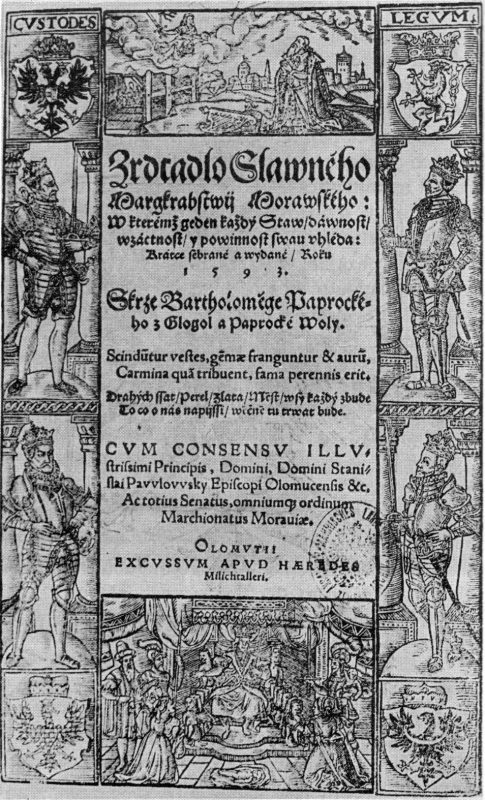
History 1300 to 1593 - Zrcadlo slavného Markrabí Moravského - by Bartosz Paprocki - 1593

== Additional reference ==
- Book: August Slavík: Dějiny města Vlašimě a jeho statku – 1889 (Digitalizováno)
- History Village of Jankov and book: August Sedláček, castles and fortresses of the kingdom of Bohemia, Vol. 15
- z Vlašimi and book: z Vlašimi, Ottova encyklopedie, 1908, retrieved 2008-06-02 (Czech)
- Jankovských z Vlašimi and book: Cenek Habarta, Sedlčansko, Sedlecko and Votice IV
- z Nemyčevsi and z Tuři and book: Jankovských z Nemyčevsi, Ottova encyklopedie, 1908
- z Úsovský
- Markéta z Vlašimi na Úsově
- Znak Liechtensteinů – Jiří J. K. Nebeský, Univerzita v Opavě
- Hynek and Maxmilian Arnošt Jankovský z Vlašimi
- Karl Vaclav Jankovský z Vlašimi, History, pages 173–175
- Anna Jankovský von Mayenhorst
- Barbara Jankovska von Raule Book: Neues allgemeines deutsches Adels-Lexicon, 1867, page 362
- Jankovský z Vlašimi, Hradu Bítova až do Ameriky – 2007
- History Jankovský at Bitov 1612 to 2012
- Coat of Arms of Moravia, August Sedláček, Pages 22–23

== Genealogy records ==
- Panstvo, Genealogie české šlechty, 2007-03-01, retrieved 2008-06-02 (Czech)
- GeneaNet.org
- Myheritage.com

== Links to coat of arms ==
- House of Vlašim:
- Coat of Arms of Moravia, August Sedláček, Pages 22–23
- Book: Monatsblatt des Heraldisch-Genealogischen Vereines "Adler", 1891, Volume 3 page 371 Franz Jankovsky von Mayenhorst
