= Jenštejn Castle =

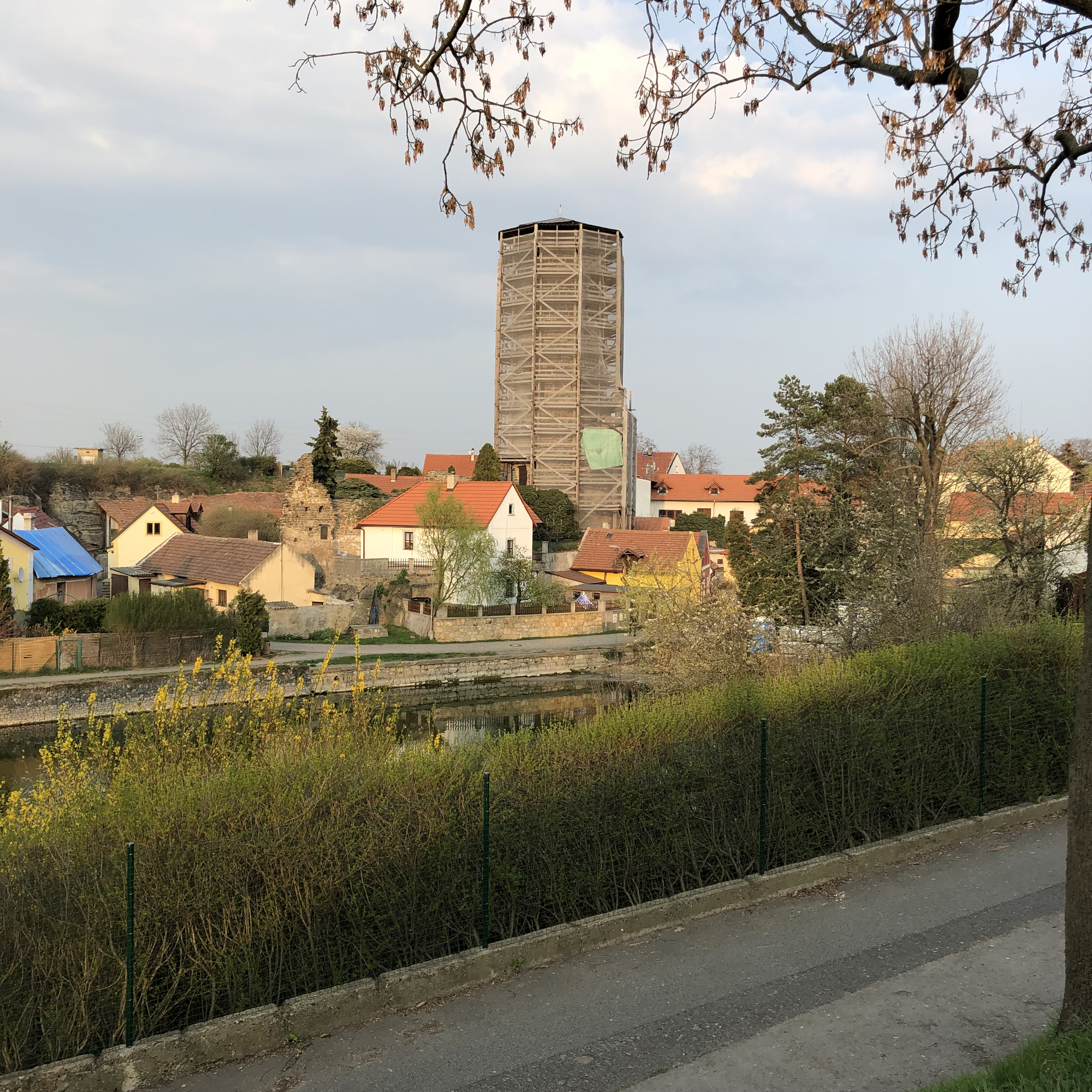
- Interactive map of the Jenštejn Castle area

General information
- Status: ruin
- Type: castle, view point, museum
- Architectural style: Gothic
- Location: Jenštejn, Czech Republic
- Coordinates: 50°9′12″N 14°36′40″E
- Completed: Between 1336 and 1361
- Renovated: 1977
- Destroyed: 1640

Height
- Height: 28 m (92 ft)

Jenštejn Castle is a castle ruin in Jenštejn in Prague-East District in the Central Bohemian Region of the Czech Republic.

The settlement of Jenštejn was founded with a small, water-protected castle in the first half of the 14th century by Jenc of Janovice (from here the name "jenc's stone" = Jencenstein), a high-ranking official in court yard, in 1336–1361. The Jenštejn family has their name from the name of the castle. Since 1958, it has been protected as a cultural monument. The castle was opened to the public after the reconstruction in 1977. Today is the castle is under the wooden frame, but still open for people. In the castle it is possible to find an exhibition of the Regional Museum of Prague-East about life in the castle with period paintings and a model of the castle. The castle tower surpasses the surrounding plain and is used as a lookout tower over the local landscape.

== History ==
The castle was built for Jenc of Janovice. It is believed that it was founded sometime in the 1330s. Only the lower part of the tower was preserved from this period of the castle, consisting of regular ashlar and adjacent walls. The first mention of the Jenštejn Castle dates back to 1368, when the royal chamber notary Pavel of Vlašim bought the castle. This branch of the family soon became the Jenštejn family (they also took over the coat of arms - two vulture heads). Pavel of Vlašim, the brother of Prague Archbishop Jan Očko of Vlašim, began to write (in the middle of the 14th century) as Paul of Jenštejn ("Paulus de Jenczenstein"). Pavel of Jenštejn had four children: Martin, Pavel, Jan and Václav and everyone also used a nickname "of Jenštejn". Jan became the third Prague archbishop in 1380 after his uncle Jan Očko of Vlašim. before he became the Archbishop of Prague, he spent his youth at Jenštejn and inherited the castle after death of his brother Martin. During his lifetime he made extensive reconstruction of the whole castle. Jan of Jenštejn was an important scholar and one of the most important figures of his timeline and so he needed representative place to show his position. Rebuilding has to reflected the importance and social prestige of its owner. The tower still bears typical features of the royalty castles: in addition to the profiling of the portals, it is the intentional use of the Štauf bossage masonry, mainly for aesthetic function. However, Jan soon got into disputes with Wenceslaus IV, who attacked the castle and then confiscated it in 1390. The king gave the castle to his favorite, under-chamberlain Sigismund Huller. Jan of Jenštejn was humiliated and forced to abdicate (1396), died in complete poverty and obscurity in 1400 in Rome. Today's village flag is inspired by the coat of arms of the Jenštejn family.

=== Destruction of castle ===
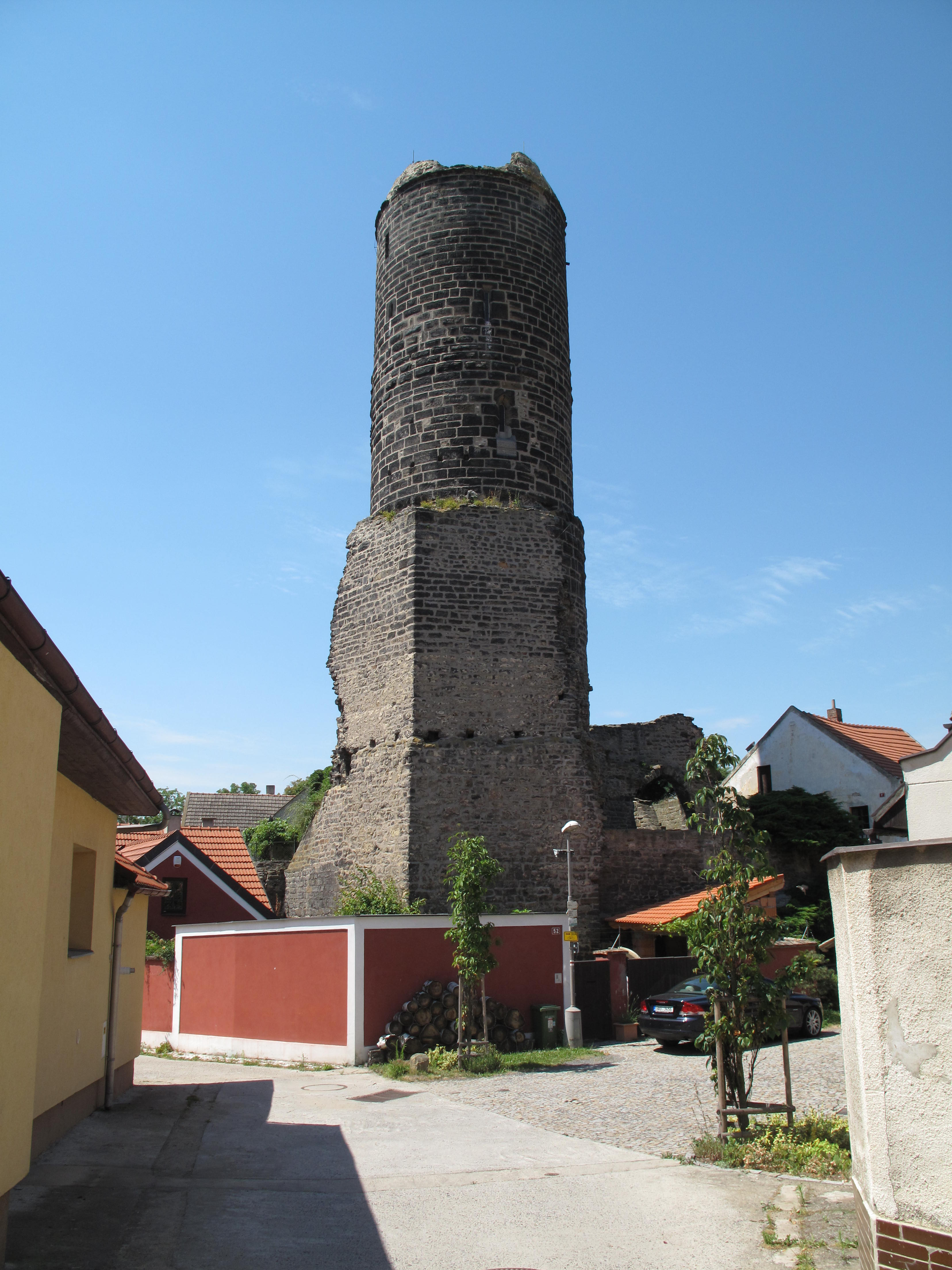
The castle without scaffolding

In the following decades, the castle was owned by many owners (Oldřich of Černice of Kácov, Ctibor Čepec of Libiš, Jindřich of Aachen, Jan Libický of Libice and others). Between 1408 and 1414 Prokop the Great reportedly grew up in the castle. Finally, his last owner was Jan Dobřichovský of Dobřichov, who acquired the castle in 1560, but he drank it, and when he died in 1583, the castle took the royal chamber due fines and added it in 1587 to the Brandýs estate. Castle lost his sense, was not inhabited and quickly fell into disrepair, so that after ten years, in 1597, the governor of Brandýs Kašpar of Milštejn announced to the chamber that Jindřich Homut of Harasov asked "for an old truss with other wood in the abandoned chateau of Ještejn", but added that "over the same castle at the tower, still a piece of brickwork around 15 pairs of rafters is standing, with beams, hambalets…", and perhaps at that time he still considered the repair of the building possible. However, no repairs were made, because the 1608's record notes Jenštejn as an "old and derelict castle".

In 1640, during the Thirty Years' War, the castle was burned down by the Swedish army. After the Thirty Years' War, Jenštejn remained for a long time only burnt, ravaged, and empty grunts, according to the Brandýs urbary from 1651 "the Jenštejn fortress ... used to be bricks covered and with few rooms inside. It stands on a rock, around fortress is trench deep fill with water, a wooden bridge was over it, and it is all abandoned and so desolate.

It was abandoned until the end of the 18th century when the castle was once again inhabited by several poor rural families, each family owned one floor. It was settled until the beginning of the 20th century. However, the families often interfered with the interior of the tower, which greatly damaged it. Their interventions were removed during the modern reconstruction. The material of the crumbling castle was also used by the locals to build their houses, which was in the case of abandoned settlements, churches, castle, etc., which is a common affair.

From 2016 until today (2019), the exterior facade of the tower is being preserved under wooden construction.

== Type of the castle ==
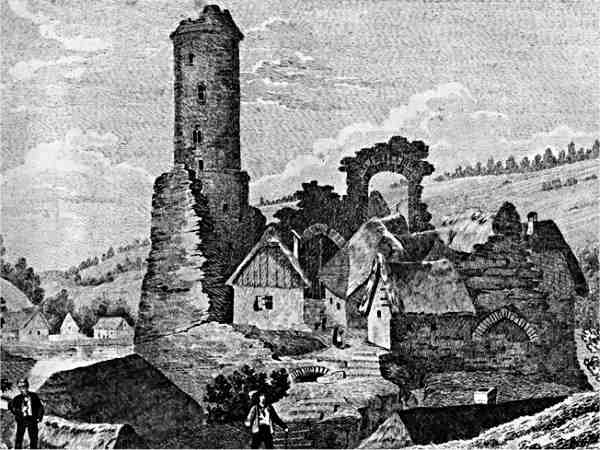
Castle in 1795

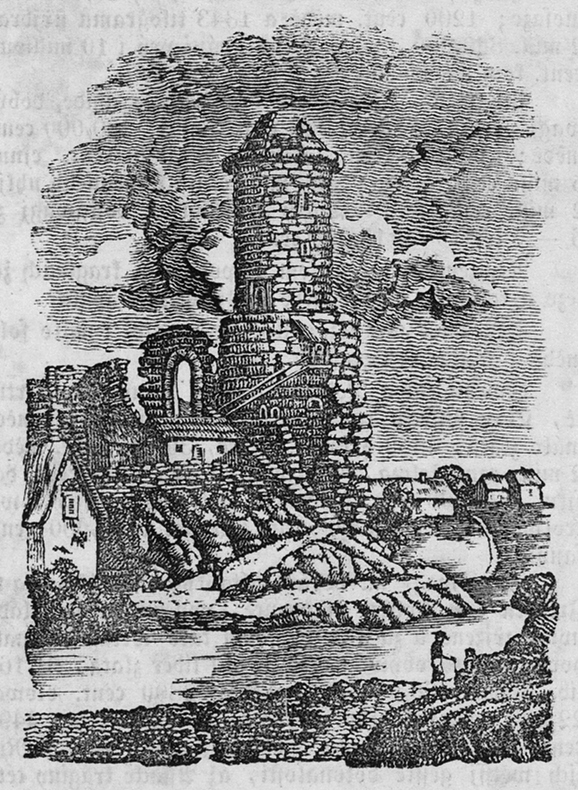
Castle in 1834

Jenštejn was founded as a water castle in valley on a low sandstone rock. The deep, rock-cut moat could be filled with water from several lakes at Vinoř Creek at any time. Today, the moat is backfilled and built up by recent buildings.

An unusual oval shape excelled in the castle's layout and the 28-meter-high tower is the first visible part of the castle. A castle core has a triangular shape.The oldest building structure is located only in a sub-part of Bergfried and the adjacent part of the wall, which is lined with smaller stones. Three palace wings surrounded the small courtyard. The north disappeared almost without a trace, because the rock below was largely excavated. From the front palace on the east side stood a part of the courtyard wall with arched entrance to the basement. A small fragment of the portal lining in the same wall illustrates the height of the original entrance. The courtyard and parts of the side walls have been preserved from the third palace. The dominant feature of the preserved part of the castle is a 28-meter-high round tower on which are three coats of arms of the owners carved from sandstone are placed at the entrance. On the second floor of the tower is a chapel on a circular ground plan. A wooden spiral staircase leads through the tower. Remains of the circumferential walls of the former palace are preserved in the courtyard. The tower was raised by Jan of Jenštejn, which can be seen in follow-up of narrower upper part to the wider lower one. This was used as a walkway for guards, later it was converted to a covered gallery. The original entrance was on the first floor after a drawbridge, but later a new one was created on the ground floor. The tower was covered with a stone helmet with four dormers, the remains of the roofing can be seen on the old engravings (still visible on 19th century engravings).

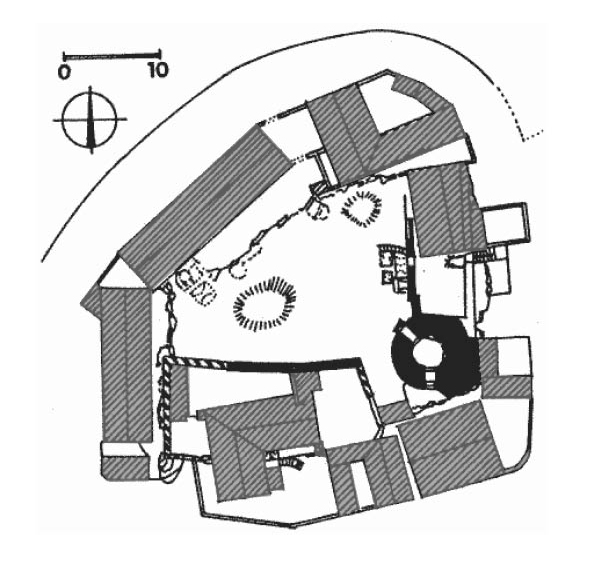
Floor plan

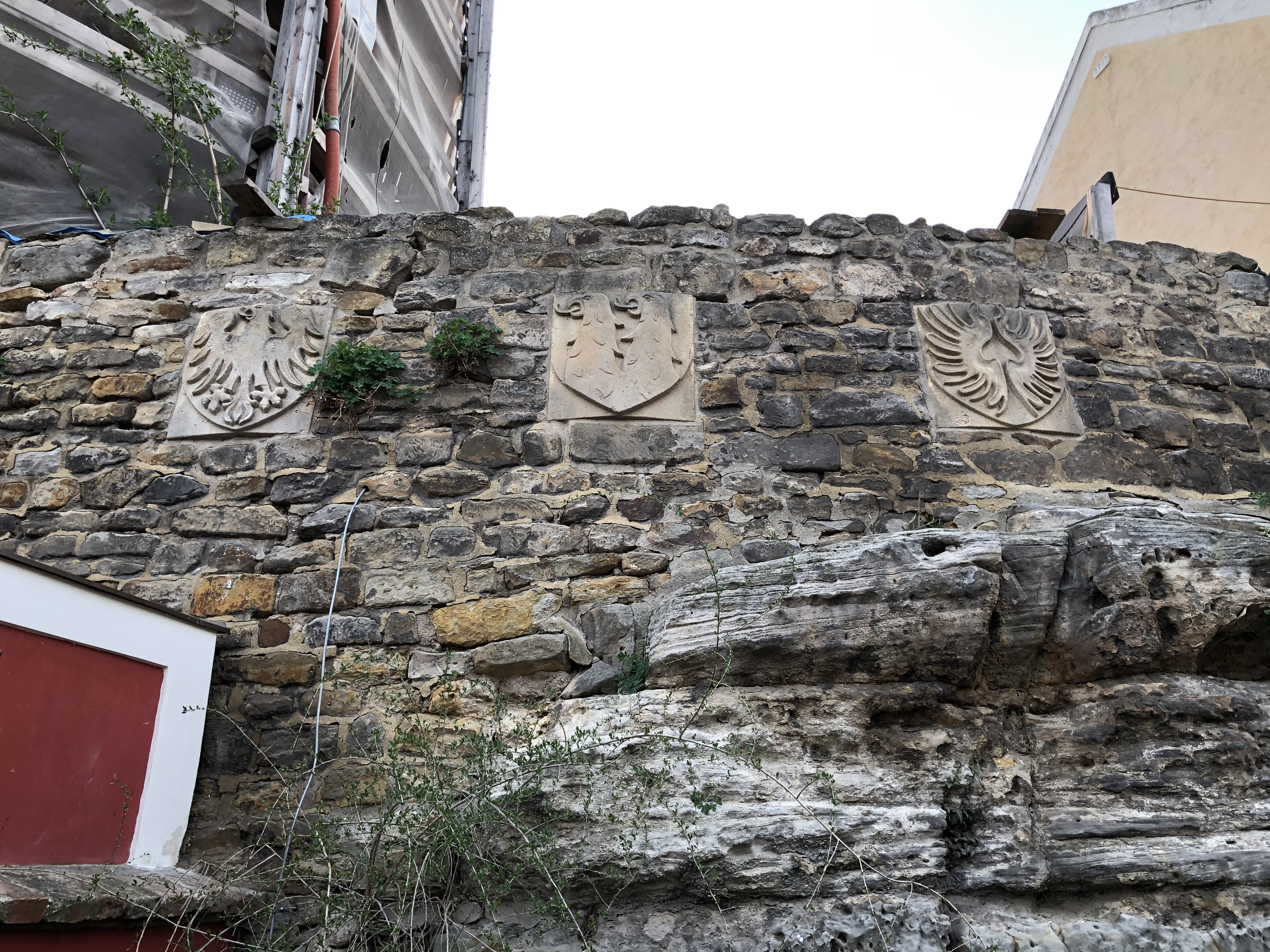
In the middle the coat of arms of the family of Jenštejn

During the reconstruction of Jan of Jenštejn, a private chapel was built on the second floor of the round tower. The circular ground plan of the chapel is vaulted with a ribbed vault with a small smooth bolt in the middle. There is also a small pentagonal presbytery vaulted with a ribbed vault and the same smooth bolt. The presbytery is illuminated by a narrow window with Gothic arch. There is a stone altar with an archbishop's personal coat of arms under the triumphal arch, which has simple geometrically indicated column base on the side of the presbytery. The bust of Archbishop Jan of Jenštejn (the most important owner of the castle) was added after the modern reconstruction into the chapel space. The bust is a replica of the triforium in St. Vitus Cathedral. In the lower part of the tower are cellars, which probably served as pantry and chambers. There are two more floors above the chapel, the first floor can be entered by a narrow spiral staircase. There is usually a small exhibition. Above this floor is unsheltered floor, accessible from ladder used as view point.

== Restoration in 2016–2019 ==
The reconstruction is funded by the Ministry of Culture grant and runs only 6 months in a year. The high cost of renting a classic tubular scaffold, which was not financed by the Ministry of Culture, was problematic. Therefore, a type of the wooden scaffolding was paid by the Ministry of Culture of the Czech Republic. The structure is now the property of the municipality and after the realization period (3 years), there will be a fine quality timber.

The scaffolding also protects neighborhood from the falling parts of the wall, which has been a great danger for the owners of surrounding houses in recent years. Thanks to the scaffolding, a number of mandatory works could be carried out: a restoration works, an operative research by experts from the National Heritage Institute, geodetic research, litological evaluation (macroscopic stone research by a geologist) and detailed photographic documentation.

The construction of the scaffolding started in December 2015 and was completed in March 2016. The restoration work in this period was limited, it was in fact cleaning of the masonry and execution of sample repairs, but mostly restoration and an operative search.

The scaffolding also includes a tower roofing. This allows work on the remains of the romantic extension, which has long been thought to be the remnant of the original Gothic tower.

Poor condition of the helmet negatively affects the condition of the masonry on the top floor of the tower.

=== 2017 ===
The restoration work consists mainly in the careful removal of incoherent masonry seams, filling deep caverns in the upper tower floors.It will also be important to remove unsuitable artificial substitutes for resin-based stone and replenish these places with stonework.

=== 2019 ===
The exterior face of the tower is being preserved and reconstruction work will continue when the weather conditions will allowed to do so.

The ruins of the Jenštejn Castle represent historically valuable structure due to the connection of the royal court and the person of Jan of Jenštejn. The reconstruction of the tower is a great chance to correct ill-performed works of past reconstructions and to stop the degradation of stonework, which in a long-term is not tolerable and poses a danger to the structure.

== Gallery ==
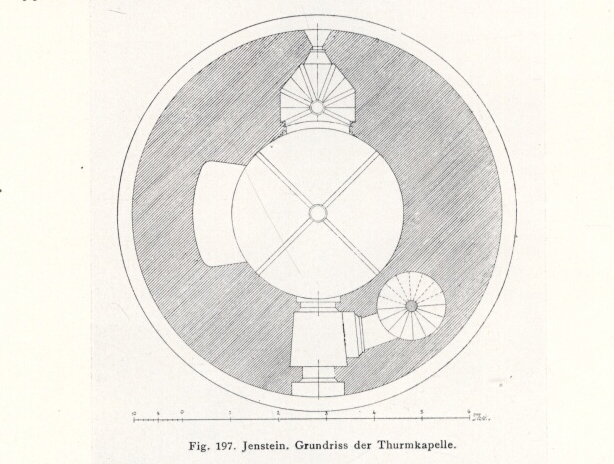
Ground plan of the chapel

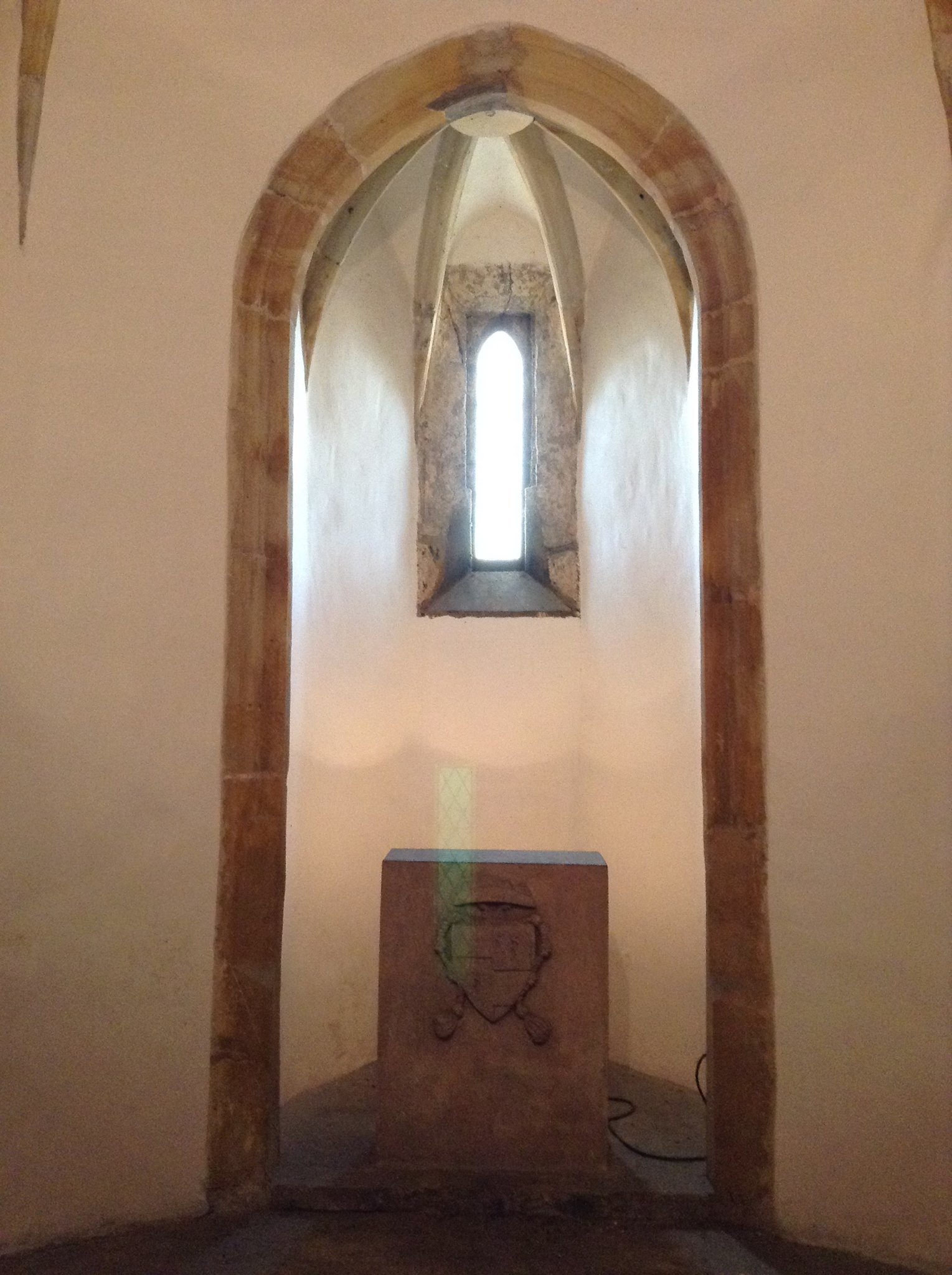
Presbytery in the chapel with a stone altar decorated with the coat of arms of Jan of Jenštejn

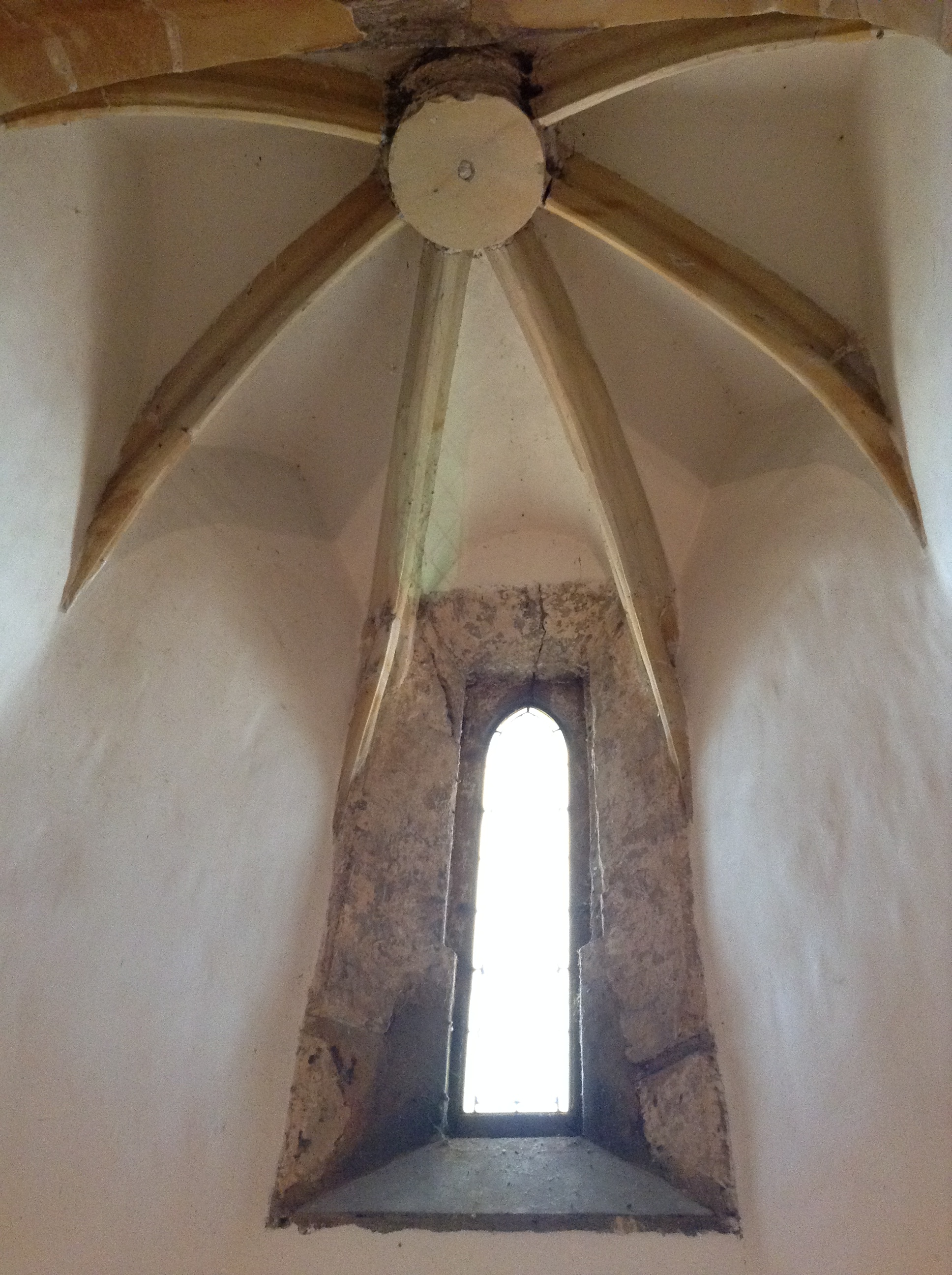
The rib vault of the presbytery with a smooth keystone

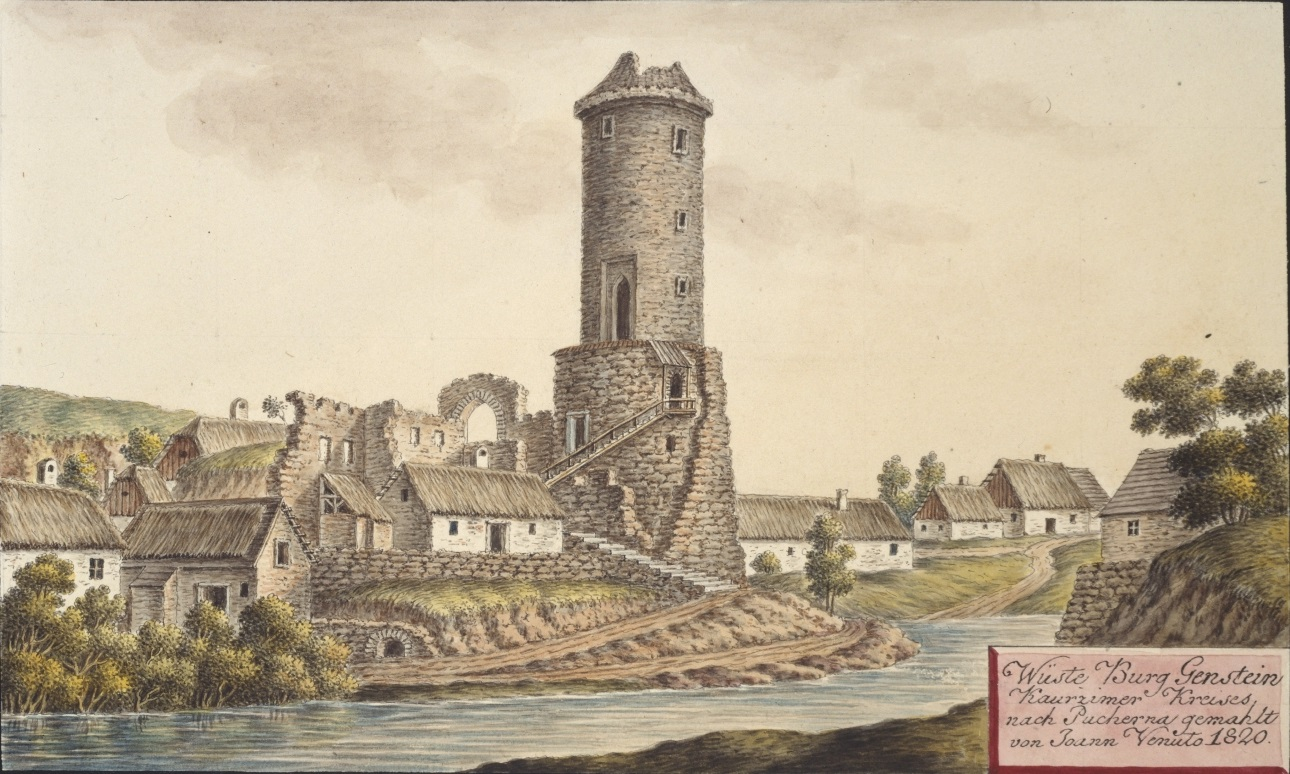
The castle in 1820

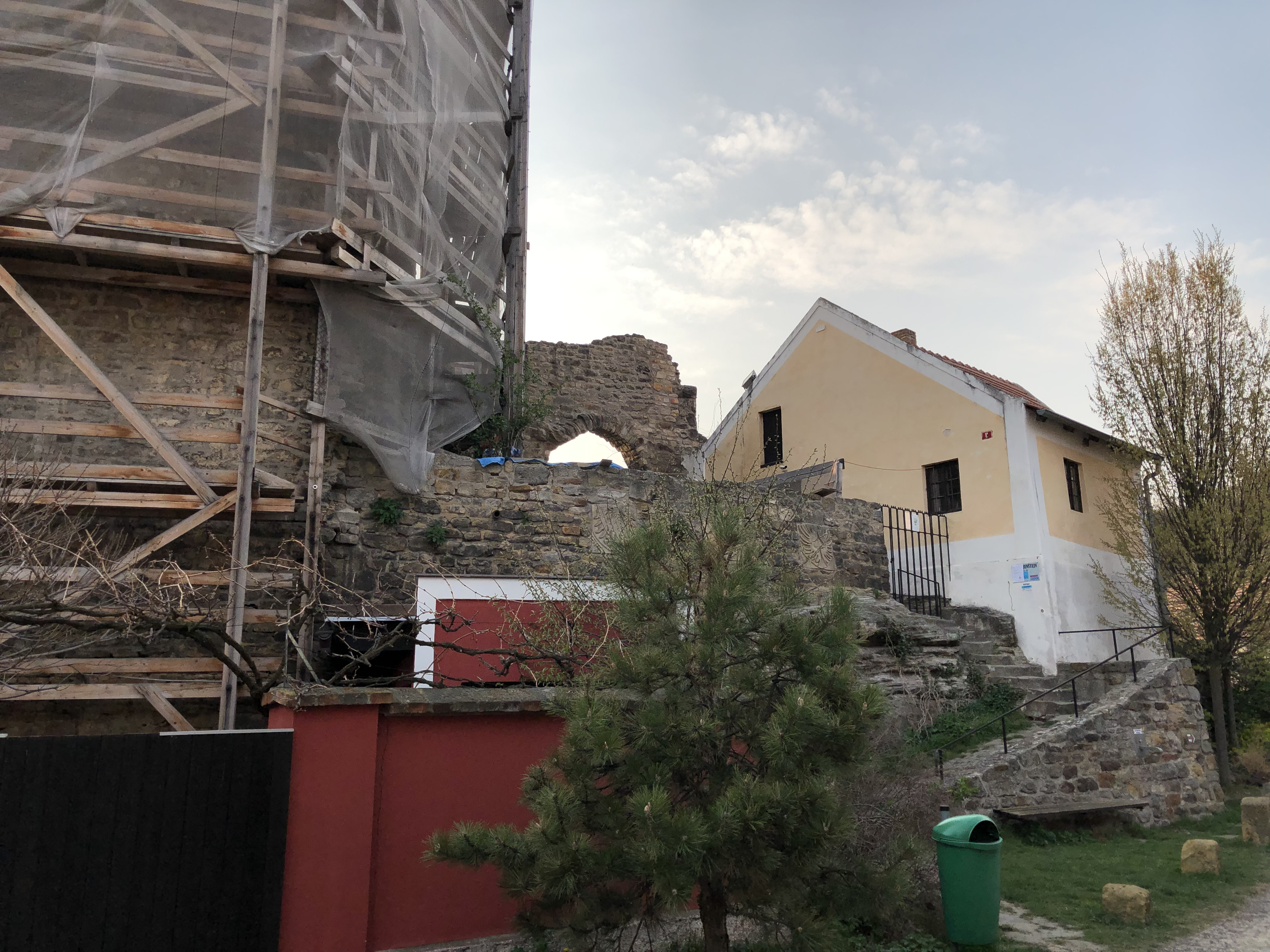
Entrance to the castle

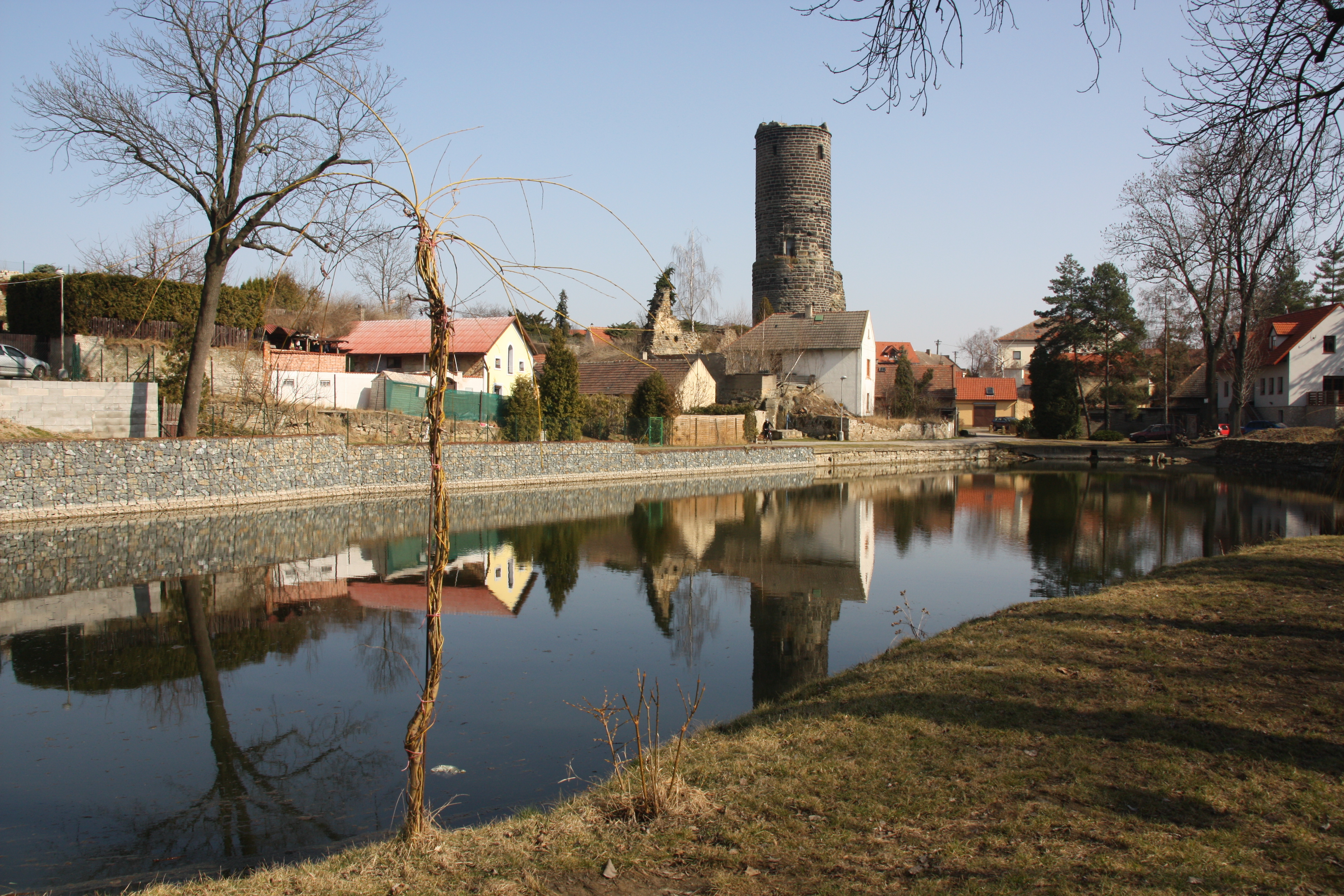
View on castle from the pond area

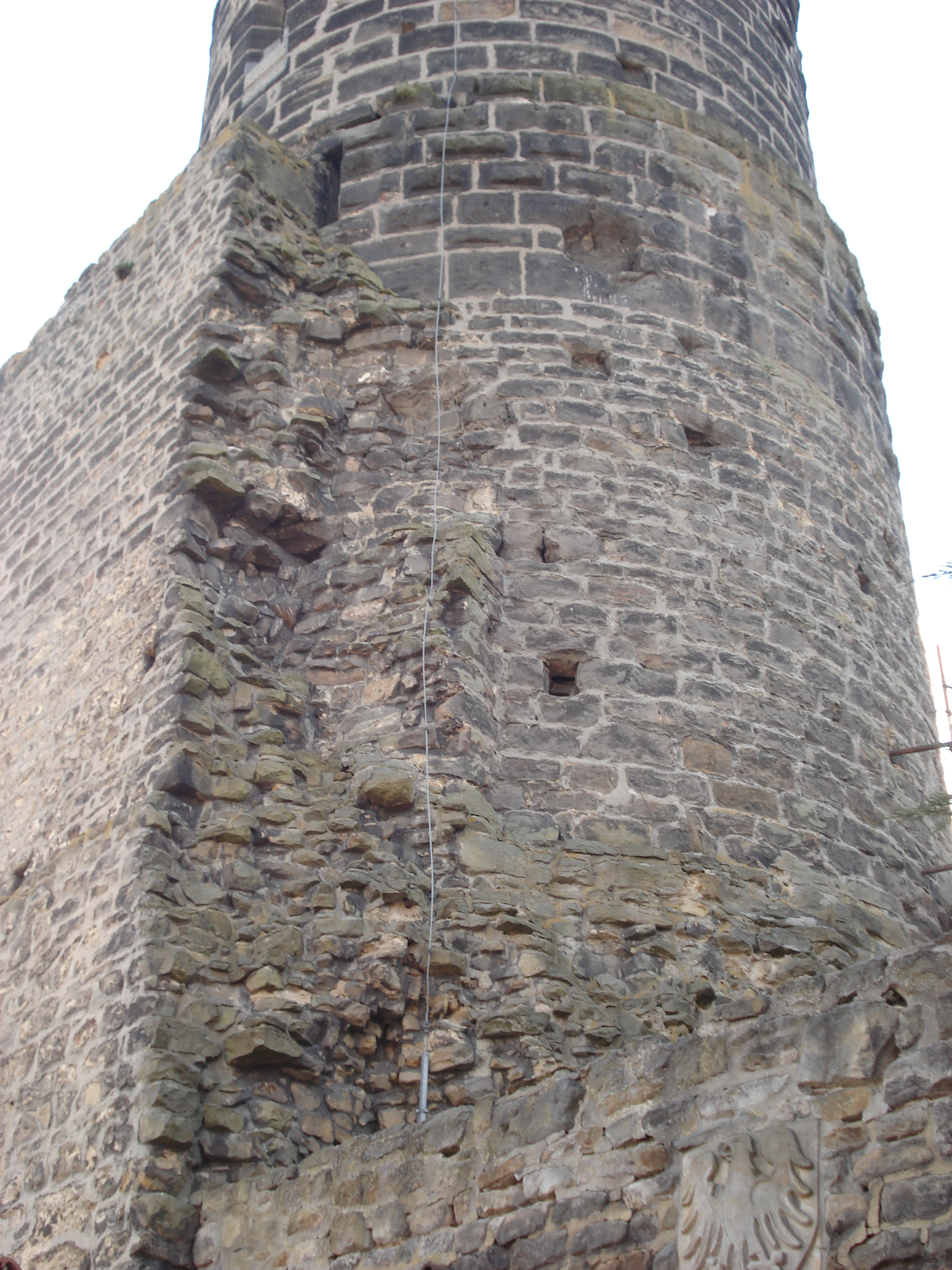
Connection of the masonry to the tower
