= Radonice (Prague-East District) =

Municipality in the Czech Republic

- Municipality
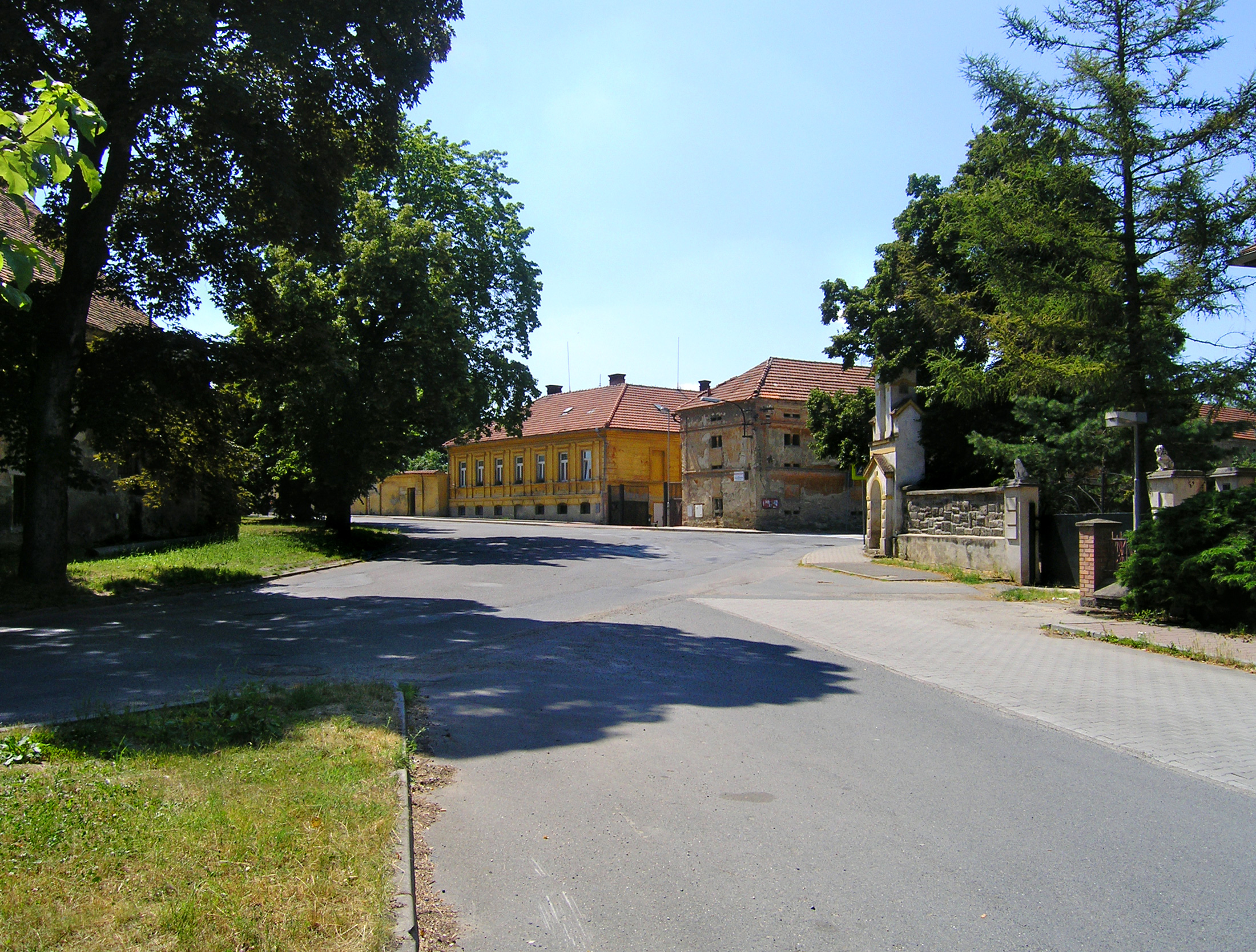
- Centre of Radonice

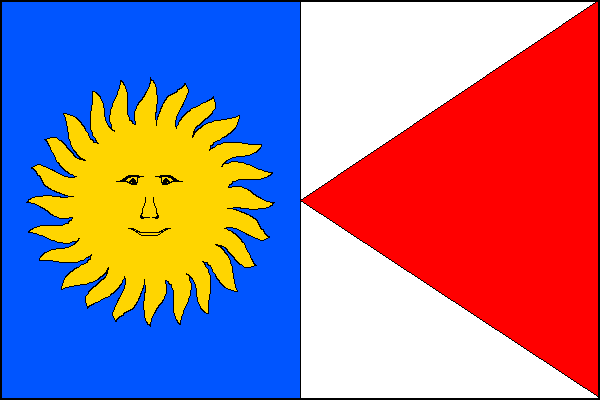
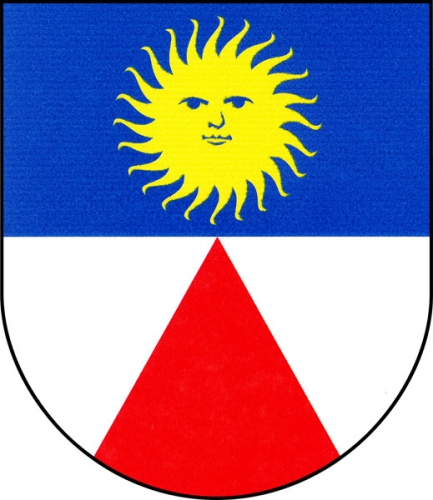
- Flag Coat of arms

- Location in the Czech Republic
- Coordinates: 50°8′35″N 14°36′37″E
- Country: Czech Republic
- Region: Central Bohemian
- District: Prague-East
- First mentioned: 1397

Area
  - Total: 4.79 km^{2} (1.85 sq mi)
- Elevation: 237 m (778 ft)

Population (2026-01-01)
  - Total: 1,159
  - Density: 242/km^{2} (627/sq mi)
- Time zone: UTC+1 (CET)
  - Summer (DST): UTC+2 (CEST)
- Postal code: 250 73
- Website: www.radonice.cz

Radonice is a municipality and village in Prague-East District in the Central Bohemian Region of the Czech Republic. It has about 1,200 inhabitants.

== Etymology ==
The name is derived from the personal name Radoň, meaning "the village of Radoň's people".

== Geography ==
Radonice is located about 6 kilometres (4 mi) northeast of Prague. It lies in a flat agricultural landscape in the Central Elbe Table.

== History ==
The first written mention of Radonice is from 1397, when it was part of the Jenštejn estate. From 1675 until the establishment of an independent municipality in 1848, Radonice was owned by the Czernin family.

== Demographics ==
Historical population

Year	Pop.	±%
1869	424	—
1880	543	+28.1%
1890	657	+21.0%
1900	714	+8.7%
1910	778	+9.0%

Year	Pop.	±%
1921	697	−10.4%
1930	758	+8.8%
1950	620	−18.2%
1961	691	+11.5%
1970	644	−6.8%

Year	Pop.	±%
1980	600	−6.8%
1991	544	−9.3%
2001	579	+6.4%
2011	795	+37.3%
2021	1,166	+46.7%

Source: Censuses

== Transport ==
The D10 motorway from Prague to Turnov runs through the southern part of the municipality.

== Sights ==
There are no protected cultural monuments in the municipality.
