= Vlašim family =

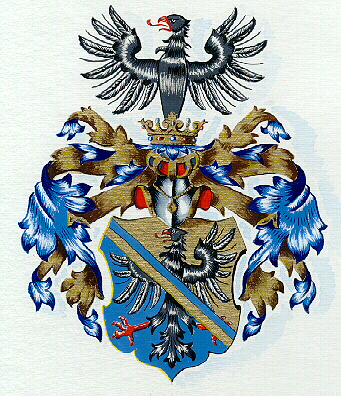
Coat of arms of the Vlašimi family

The Vlašimi family was an old and prominent noble family in the Kingdom of Bohemia.

== History ==
Its members were knights and nobles, with history going back to the end of the 13th century. It divided into family lines: Vlašimskou, Jankovskou, Jenšteinskou, Nemyčevsi and Úsovskou.

== Coat of arms ==
The family coat of arms features the sable eagle of house of Vlastislaviců on a shield and, in the middle of 14th century, two gules vulture heads on silver shield. In 1615, the two were combined into the coat of arms of Jankovský z Vlašimi.

Reference: Paprocki 1593

Coat of arms featuring a sable eagle.

Coat of arms featuring two gules vultures.

Combined coat of arms of Jankovský z Vlašimi.

== See also ==
- Jan Očko z Vlašime
- Z Jenštejna
- Jankovský of Vlašim
