= Votive Panel of Jan Očko of Vlašim =

14th-century painting

- Votivní obraz Jana Očka z Vlašimi (Czech)
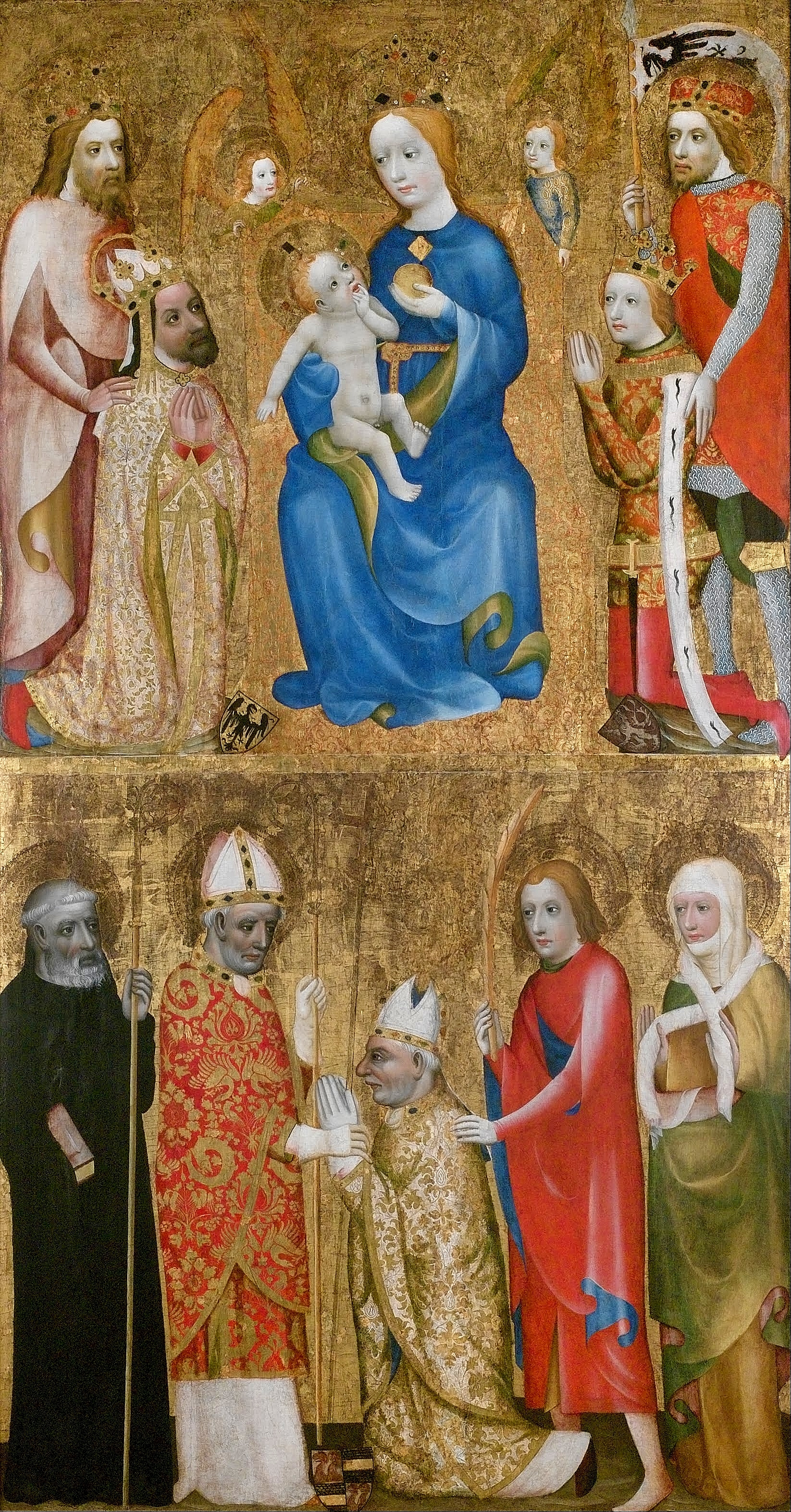
- Artist: Unknown
- Year: before 1371
- Type: Tempera on lime wood
- Dimensions: 181 cm × 96 cm (71 in × 38 in)
- Location: National Gallery in Prague

The Votive Panel of Jan Očko of Vlašim (Note: Alternative names: Votive Picture of Jan Očko of Vlašim, Votive Painting of Jan Očko of Vlašim, Votive Panel of Archbishop Očko of Vlašim, Votive Panel of Archbishop Jan Očko of Vlašim, Votive Painting of Archbishop John Očko of Vlašim, etc.) is a Gothic panel painting now in the National Gallery in Prague, Czech Republic. It is one of the most important artworks made in medieval Bohemia. The panel was painted for the Prague archbishop Jan Očko of Vlašim who is depicted kneeling before St. Adalbert of Prague in the lower part of the picture (donor portrait). The author(s) of the painting is (are) not known. The style of the painting stands between the works of Theodoric of Prague and the Master of the Třeboň Altarpiece (who represents the so-called Beautiful style, Central European form of International Gothic).

== History ==
The panel was originally placed in the chapel of Roudnice Castle, which belonged to the bishops and archbishops of Prague who used it as their residence. In 1371 the chapel was consecrated in honor of the Virgin Mary and patron saints of Bohemia, and this is probably the date when the picture was finished.

== Description ==
The picture measures 181 x 96 cm and it is painted on a panel made of lime wood.

The painting is divided into two parts. In the middle of the upper part is the Virgin sitting on a throne with the infant Jesus. They are adored by kneeling Emperor Charles IV and his son King Wenceslaus IV. St. Sigismund of Burgundy stands behind Charles IV, while St. Wenceslaus of Bohemia stands behind the young king as his patron. In the lower part of the panel stand other Bohemian (Czech) patron saints (from the left): St. Procopius, St. Adalbert, St. Vitus and St. Ludmila. In the middle there is kneeling Archbishop Jan Očko of Vlašim who is adoring St. Adalbert, his predecessor in the post of bishop of Prague.
