= Jenštejn =

- Municipality
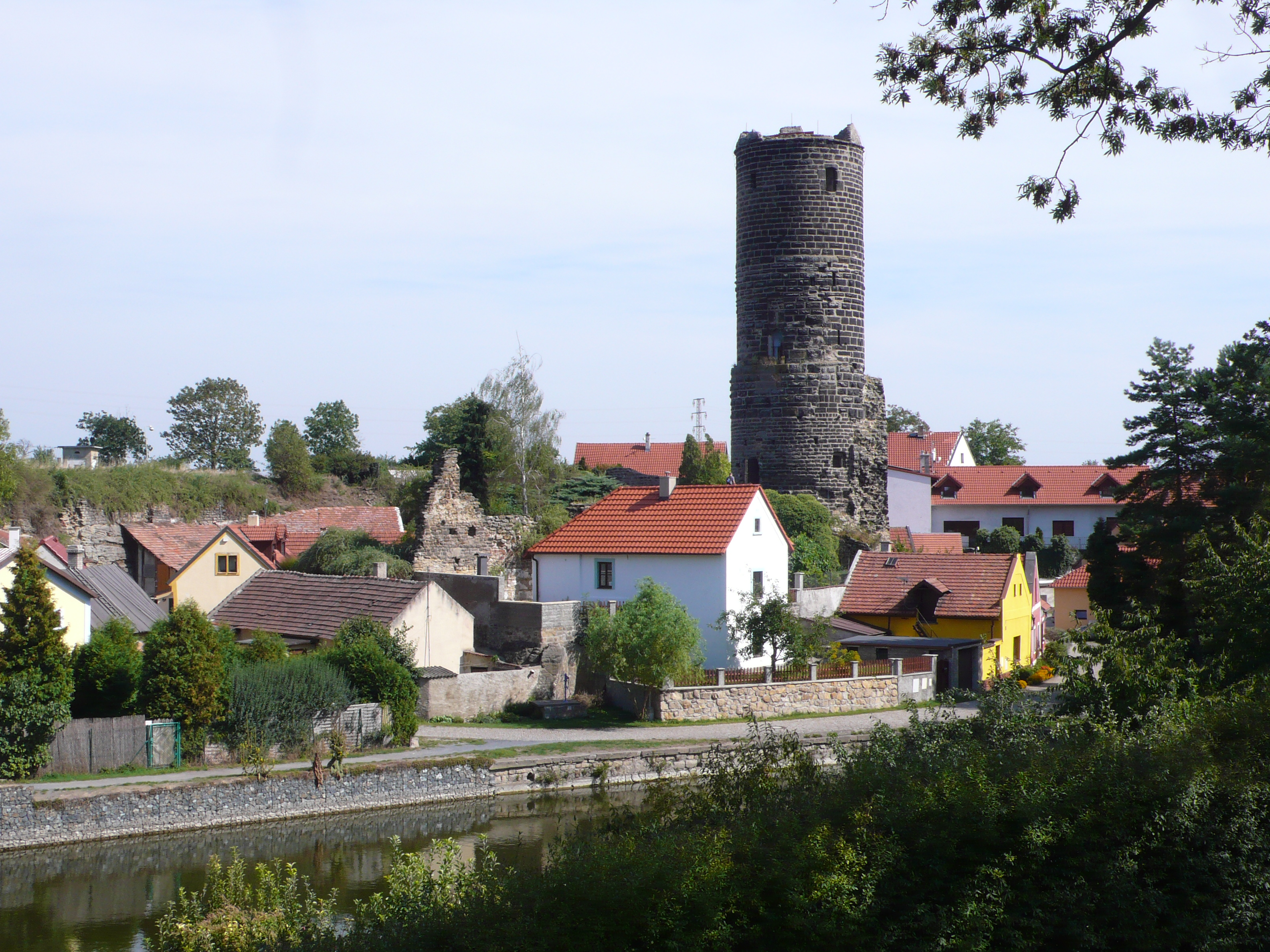
- View towards the Jenštejn Castle

- Flag Coat of arms

- Location in the Czech Republic
- Coordinates: 50°9′10″N 14°36′43″E
- Country: Czech Republic
- Region: Central Bohemian
- District: Prague-East
- First mentioned: 1368

Area
  - Total: 5.09 km^{2} (1.97 sq mi)
- Elevation: 232 m (761 ft)

Population (2026-01-01)
  - Total: 1,526
  - Density: 300/km^{2} (776/sq mi)
- Time zone: UTC+1 (CET)
  - Summer (DST): UTC+2 (CEST)
- Postal codes: 250 73, 250 91
- Website: www.jenstejn.cz

Jenštejn (German: Jenstein) is a municipality and village in Prague-East District in the Central Bohemian Region of the Czech Republic. It has about 1,500 inhabitants.

== Administrative division ==
Jenštejn consists of two municipal parts (in brackets population according to the 2021 census):

- Jenštejn (1,432)
- Dehtáry (129)

== Etymology ==
The initial name of the village and the local castle was Jencenstein, meaning "Jenc's stone". It was later distorted to Jenštejn.

== Geography ==
Jenštejn is located about 7 kilometres (4 mi) northeast of Prague. It lies in a flat agricultural landscape in the Central Elbe Table.

== History ==
The first written mention of Jenštejn is from 1368. The village was founded together with a small water castle in the 14th century by Jenc of Janovice. From 1368 to 1387, it was property of the Jenštejn family. Then the owners often changed. The last person to reside in the castle was Jan Dobřichovský of Dobřichov in the years 1560–1583. After his death, the castle was seized by the royal chamber due to his debts, and in 1587 Jenštejn was annexed to the Brandýs estate. After that, the castle was abandoned and fell into disrepair.

In 1640, during the Thirty Years' War, Jenštejn and the castle were burned by the Swedish army under the command of Johan Banér. Between 1655 and 1660, the village was restored and promoted to a market town. It was a market town until the beginning of the 20th century.

== Demographics ==
Historical population

Year	Pop.	±%
1869	479	—
1880	527	+10.0%
1890	496	−5.9%
1900	518	+4.4%
1910	512	−1.2%

Year	Pop.	±%
1921	476	−7.0%
1930	538	+13.0%
1950	402	−25.3%
1961	379	−5.7%
1970	362	−4.5%

Year	Pop.	±%
1980	424	+17.1%
1991	491	+15.8%
2001	508	+3.5%
2011	1,039	+104.5%
2021	1,561	+50.2%

Source: Censuses

== Transport ==
The D10 motorway from Prague to Turnov crosses the municipal territory in the southeast.

== Sights ==
Jenštejn is known for ruins of the Jenštejn Castle. Today it is owned by the municipality and is open to the public. Its well-preserved round, 22 m (72 ft) high tower is the main landmark of Jenštejn.
