= Jenštejn family =

Noble family in the medieval Kingdom of Bohemia

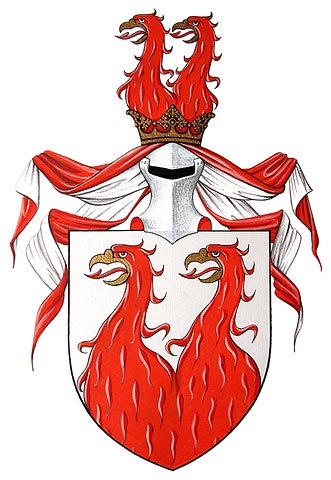
Coat of arms of the lords of Jenštejn

The Jenštejn family (Czech: Jenštejnové or Páni z Jenštejna) was a noble family in the medieval Kingdom of Bohemia. The family was founded by a wealthy Prague burgher Pavel. He was listed in 1360 as a royal notary. In 1368, he bought Jenštejn Castle and used the surname z Jenštejna for the first time. He had four sons: Martin, Jan, Pavel and Václav. The most important was Jan of Jenštejn, who following the resignation of his uncle Jan Očko of Vlašim became Prague Archbishop in 1378.

Vaněk of Jenštejn, son of Pavel II of Jenštejn, was the owner of castles Bradlec and Staré Hrady near Jičín. Vaněk rebelled against the King Wenceslaus IV and Bradlec was taken by the royal army in 1417. His son Mikuláš (+ 1459) was the last lord of Jenštejn.

The coat of arms of the Jenštejn family is gules two vulture heads on a silver background.
