= Kašperk Castle =

Coordinates: 49°09′58″N 13°33′50″E

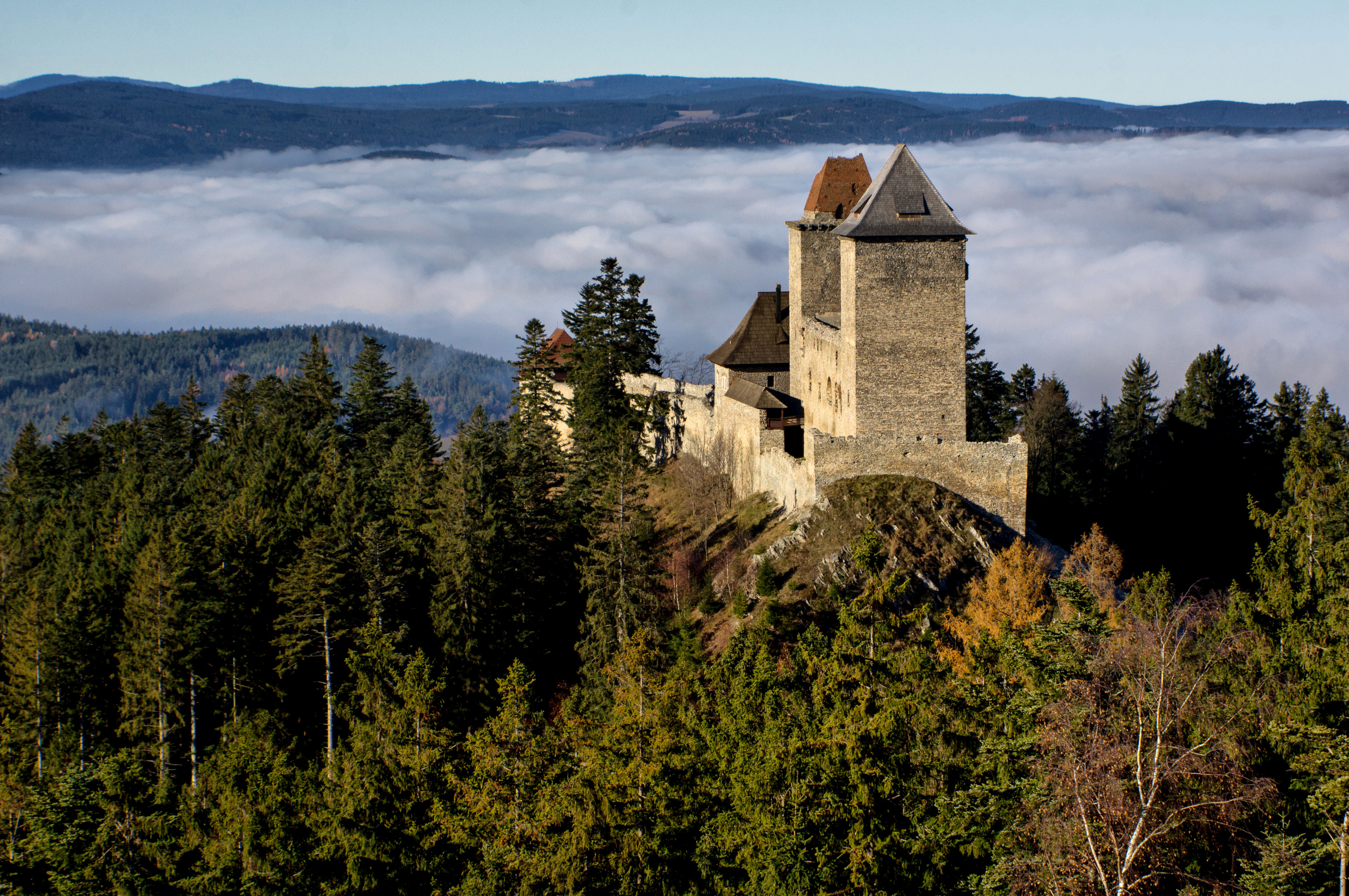
Kašperk Castle

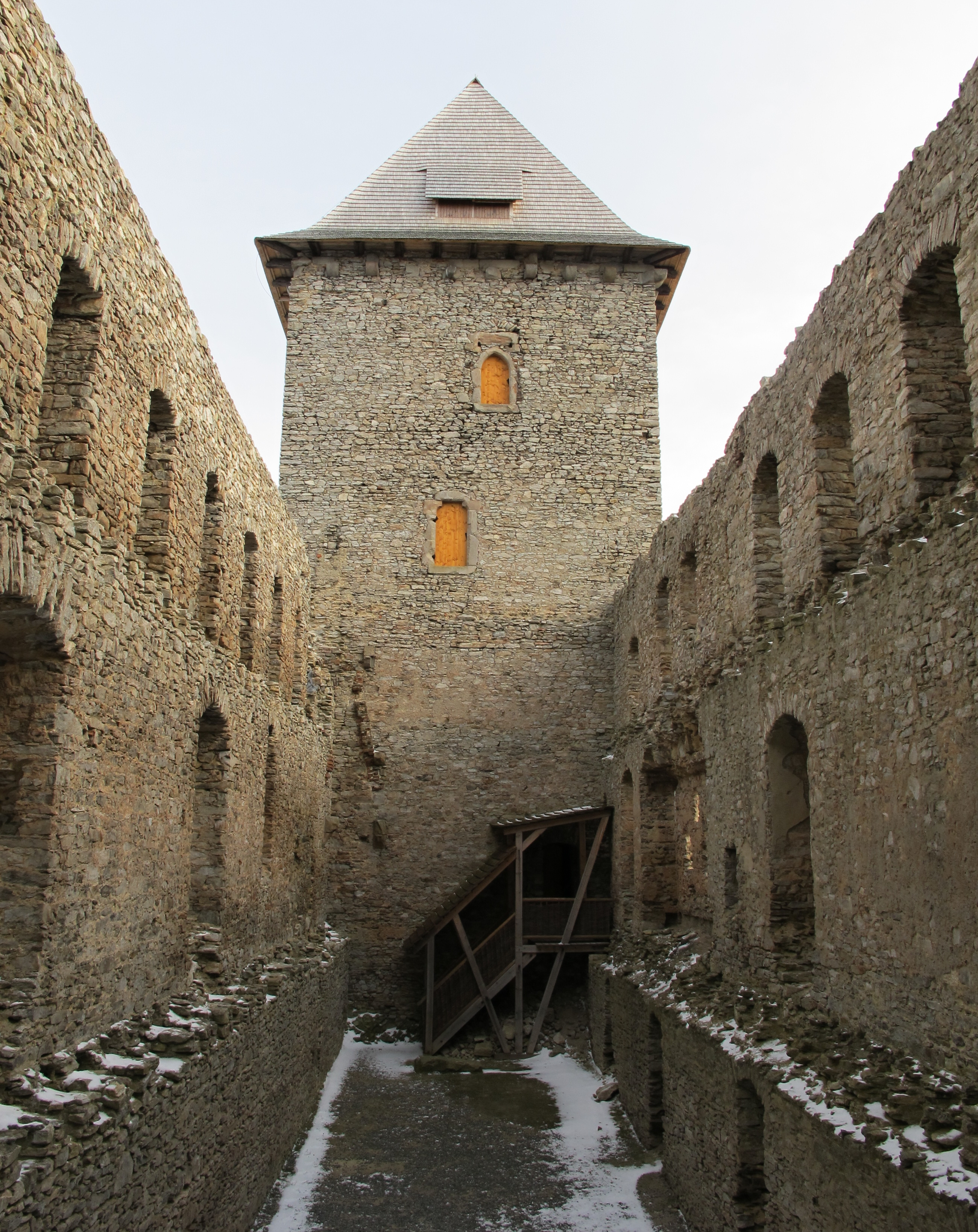
Kasperk Castle

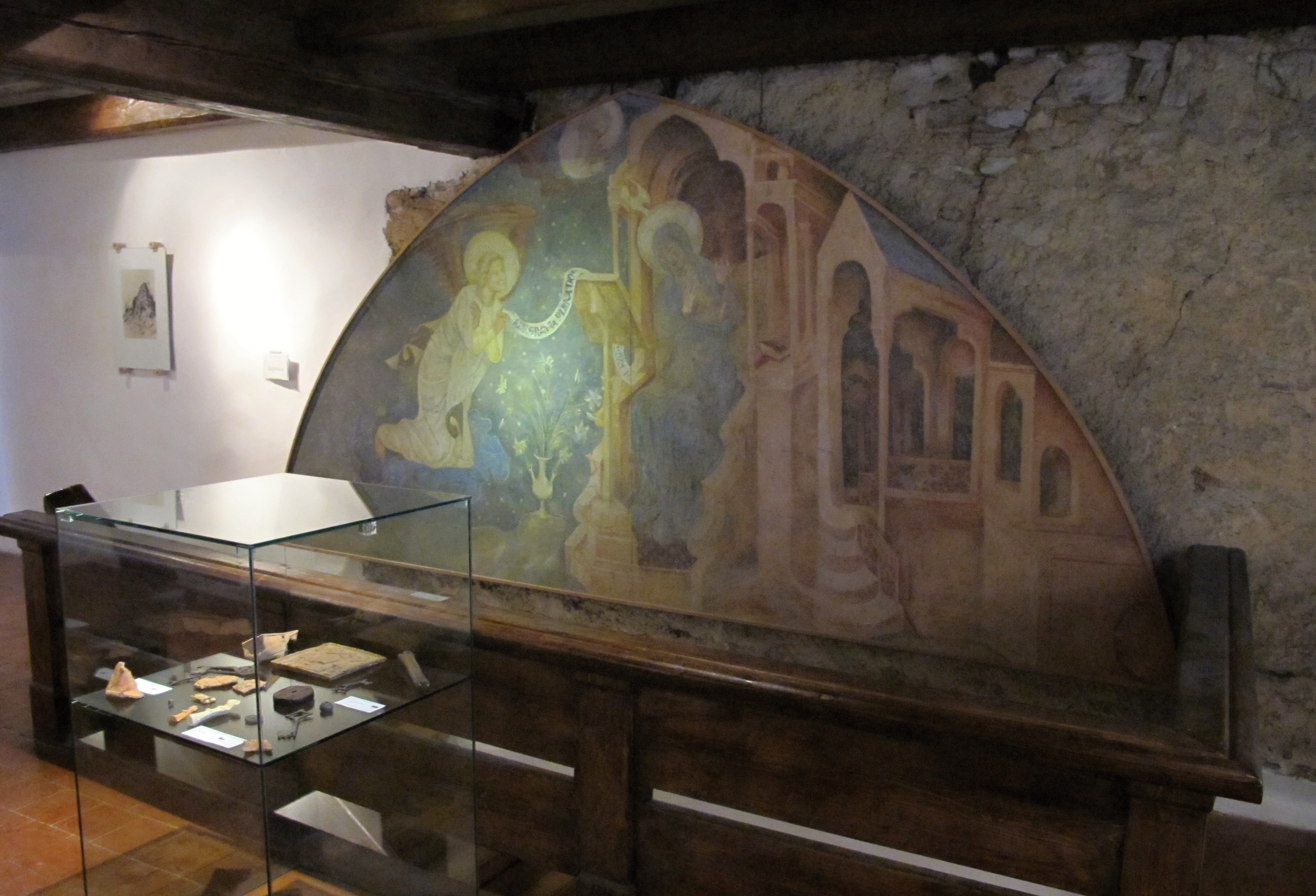
One of the rooms in the Kasperk Castle

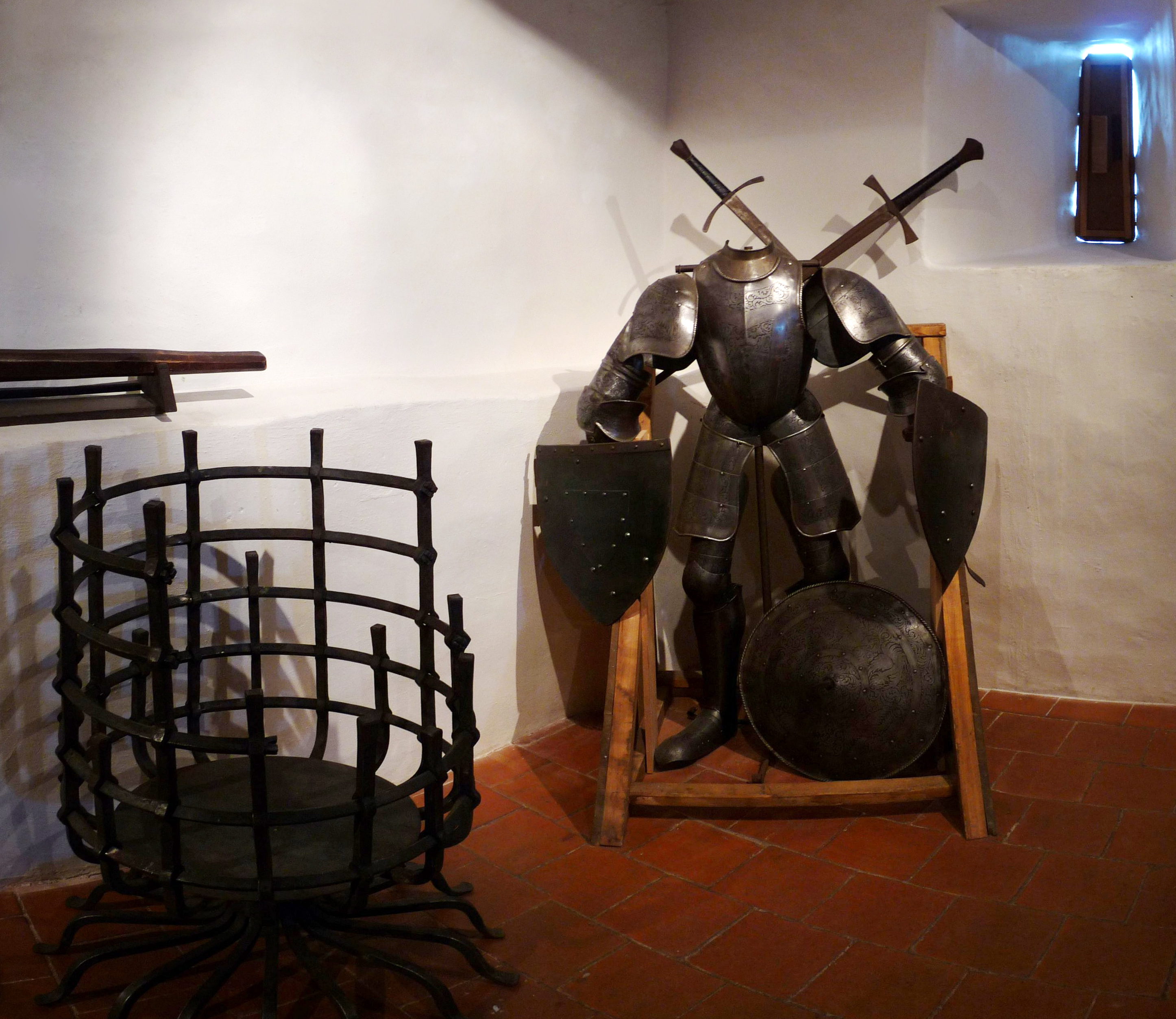
The interior of the castle

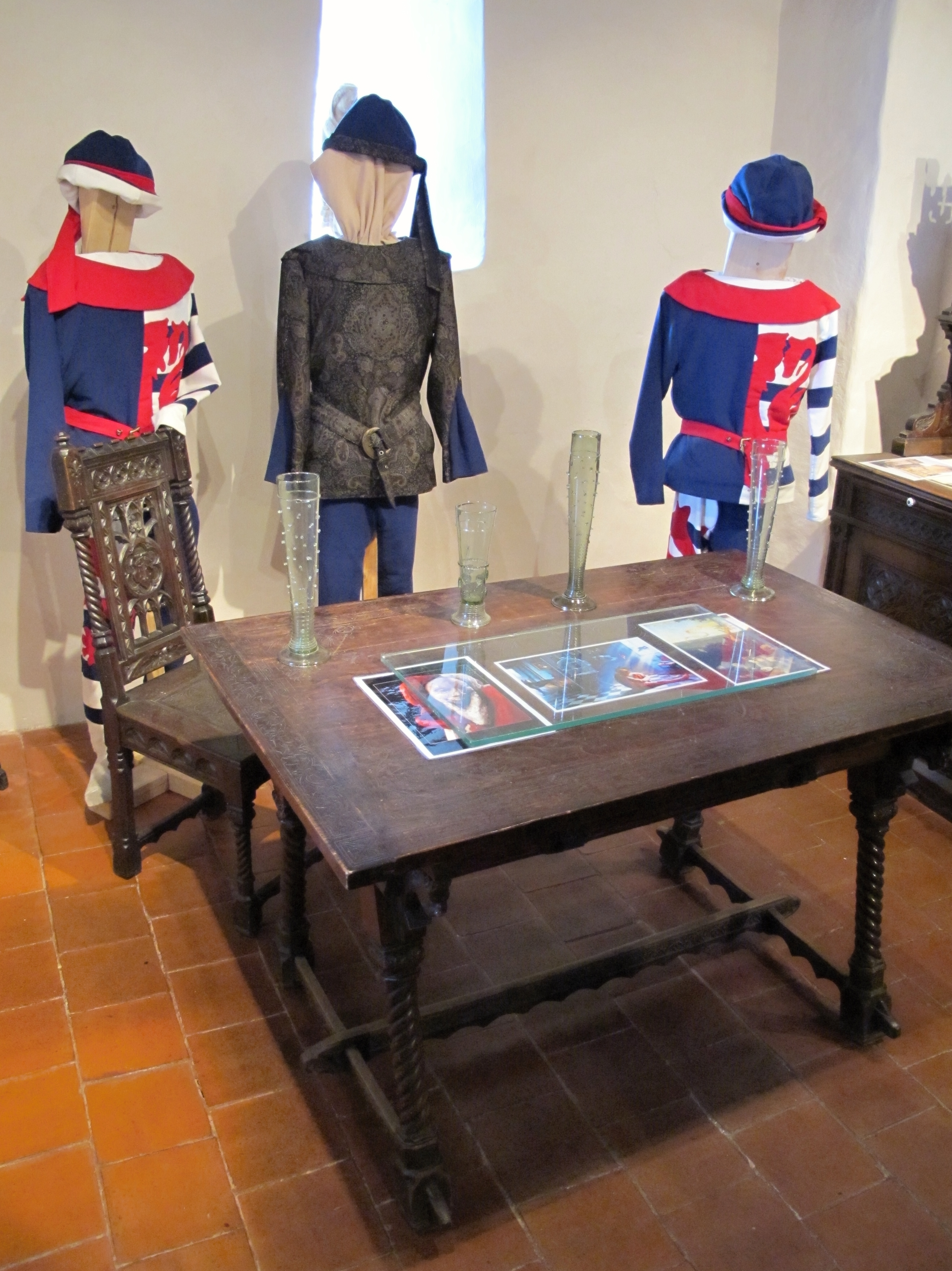
One of the exhibition rooms in the Kasperk Castle

Kašperk Castle (Czech: hrad Kašperk, German: Karlsberg) is a medieval castle placed in southwestern Bohemia (modern Czech Republic, former Kingdom of Bohemia). It is said to be the most highly located royal castle in Bohemia. Its elevation is 886 metres (2,907 ft) above sea level). The castle is in property of the Town of Kašperské Hory since 1616.

== History ==
Kašperk Castle was founded in 1356 by Holy Roman Emperor and King of Bohemia Charles IV to protect Bohemia's borders. Historians and scholars believe the castle was built, primarily, for three reasons. The first was about security. Bohemia needed to bolster their border defense against Bavaria. Secondly, the castle's location was chosen so as to allow for absolute control over the gold-rich region near Kašperské Hory/Bergreichenstein. The third reason for building Kašperk Castle was because Kašperk lay in the path of the "Golden Route," a trade route that connected Bohemia and Bavaria to the affluent areas of western Europe.

A royal castle in name and status, the Kašperk Castle, however, had no royal occupant. The castle was given over to the king's pledge holders. Along with the castle, the occupant of the Kašperk castle also received from the king the authority over administrative and judicial matters in the region of Prácheň, which encompassed a significant part of southwestern Bohemia.

The Kašperk Castle's first pledge holders were the second archbishop of Prague and the first Czech cardinal, Jan Očko of Vlašim. From 1411 to 1454 Kašperk Castle was in the hands of the house of Zmrzlík of Svojšín and Orlík. The father and son of this house, both named Peter, oversaw a relatively peaceful time in the castle's history. Peter, the father, was a royal moneyer. He and his son were followers of Utraquism, which was also endorsed by the Hussite. It was this allegiance of the Peters that the Hussites never attacked the castle. The younger Peter, on the other hand, made numerous raids on the neighboring catholic Bavaria.

During the mid-15th century ownership of the Kašperk Castle passed to the hands of the powerful Šternberkové/Sternberg family of Šternberk/Sternberg. The family held immense sway over the region. This powerful and lucrative position in the region made Zdeněk of Šternberk ambitious, and in 1465 he led an armed revolt against King George of Poděbrady. The Kašperk Castle abruptly became a strategic citadel. With the castle becoming involved in the fighting, the garrison occupying it readied themselves against an onslaught by the king's forces. In order to bolster their defenses, a small fortress was hastily constructed. Ruins situated 400 metres (1,300 ft) to the castle's east are believed to be the remains of that fortress, which today is referred to as the Deserted Fort.

In July 1940, when the Donau-Zeitung referred to a folklore of three Nornen, the writer alluded to sisters who once lived at the Castle, and cheated the blind one out of her fortune.

== Description ==
The central part of the castle consists of two residential towers and an oblong palace which was built between them.

== Architecture ==
The architecture of the palace was designed to give the castle the utmost security and ability to function as a stronghold. The central part of the castle was built away from the outer walls. To further make the castle resistant to raids, the front walls of the towers, which rise 30 metres (98 ft), were kept devoid of openings, except the bay window in the western tower. This design was adopted to make the castle less susceptible to attacks.

== Location ==
A road runs to within 1,200 metres (3,900 ft) of the castle, where there is a parking area. The road to the castle passes through the towns of Kašperské Hory and Nezdice. Tourists also have the option to walk to the castle. Several trails branch out from Kašperské Hory. Railway lines and bus routes also pass near the castle. The railway station is at Sušice, and buses are available from there to Kašperské Hory.

== Gallery ==
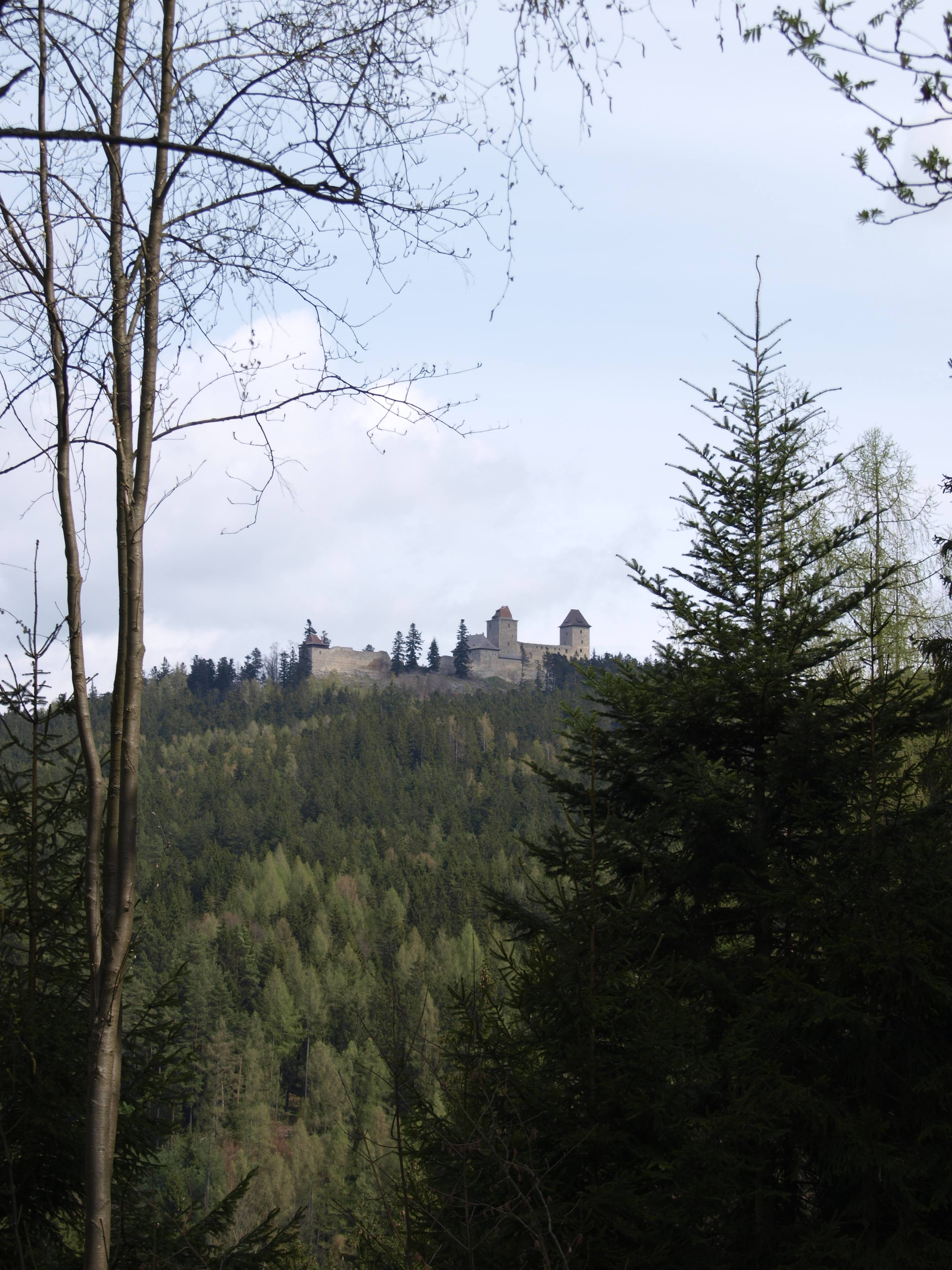
