= Rešice =

- Municipality
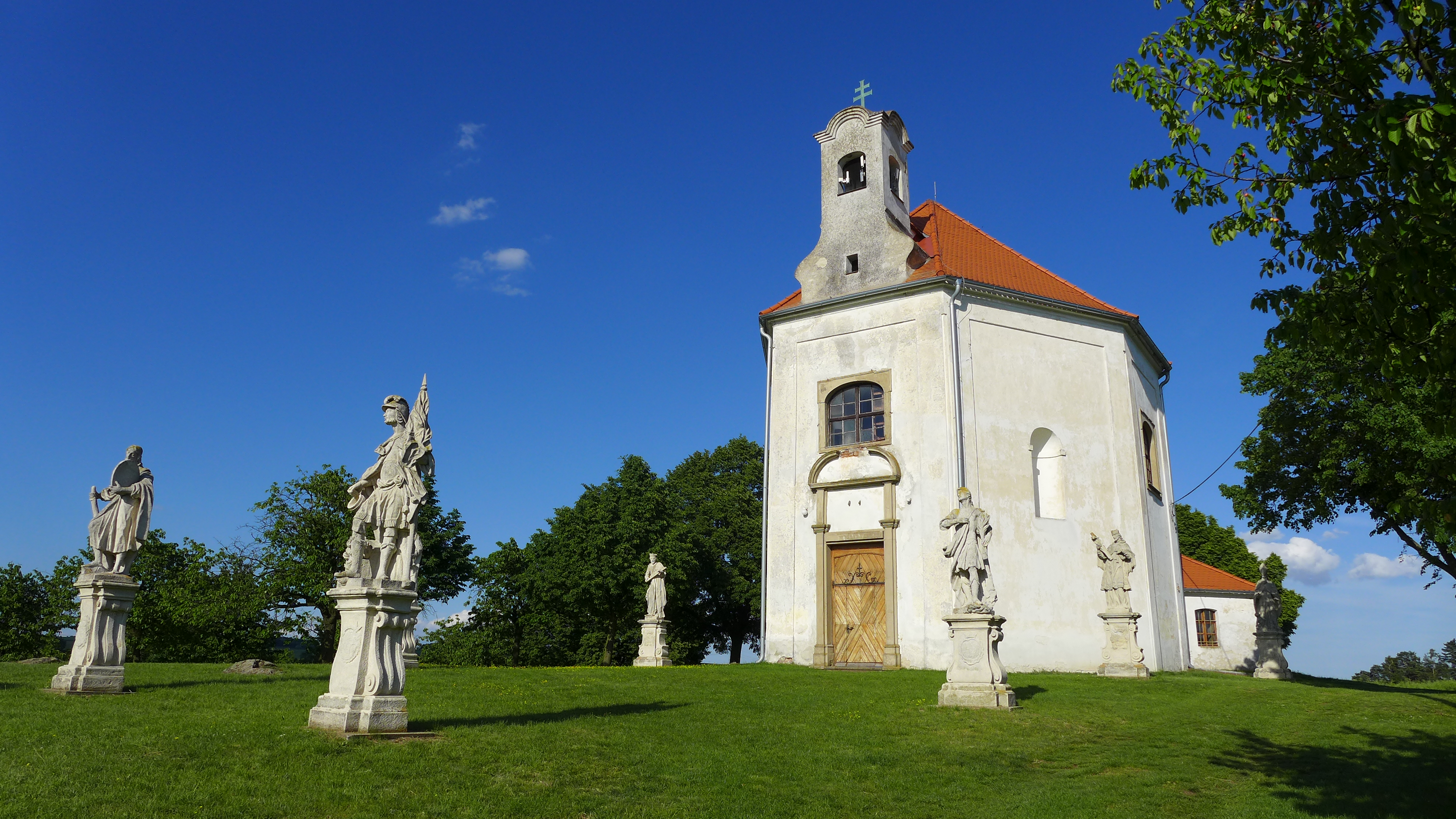
- Chapel of Saint John of Nepomuk

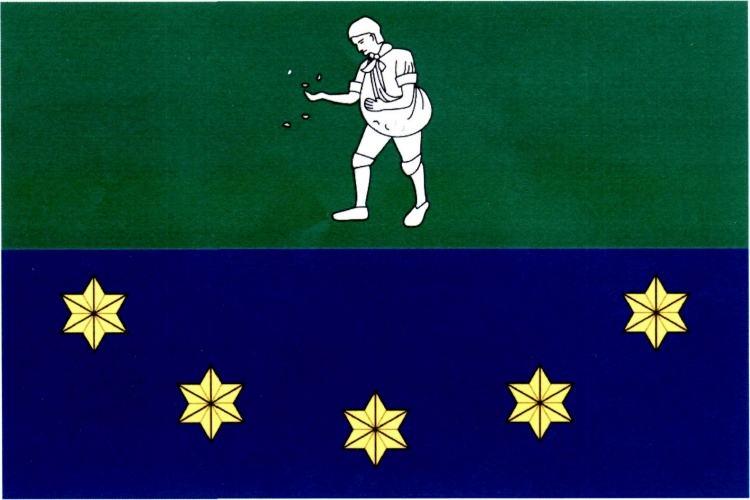
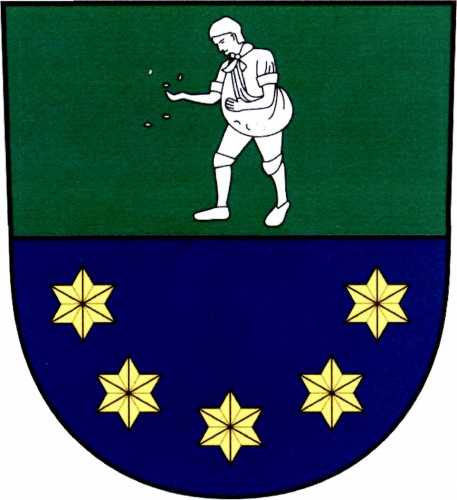
- Flag Coat of arms

- Location in the Czech Republic
- Coordinates: 49°3′12″N 16°10′17″E
- Country: Czech Republic
- Region: South Moravian
- District: Znojmo
- First mentioned: 1358

Area
  - Total: 9.97 km^{2} (3.85 sq mi)
- Elevation: 314 m (1,030 ft)

Population (2026-01-01)
  - Total: 325
  - Density: 32.6/km^{2} (84.4/sq mi)
- Time zone: UTC+1 (CET)
  - Summer (DST): UTC+2 (CEST)
- Postal code: 671 73
- Website: www.resice.cz

Rešice is a municipality and village in Znojmo District in the South Moravian Region of the Czech Republic. It has about 300 inhabitants.

== Demographics ==
Historical population
Year	Pop.	±%
1869	435	—
1880	478	+9.9%
1890	534	+11.7%
1900	555	+3.9%
1910	604	+8.8%
1921	636	+5.3%
1930	626	−1.6%
1950	555	−11.3%
1961	540	−2.7%
1970	526	−2.6%
1980	455	−13.5%
1991	393	−13.6%
2001	351	−10.7%
2011	353	+0.6%
2021	327	−7.4%
Source: Censuses

== Notable people ==
- Adolf Opálka (1915–1942), soldier and resistance fighter
