= Jan of Jenštejn =

Bohemian archbishop, composer and poet (1348–1400)

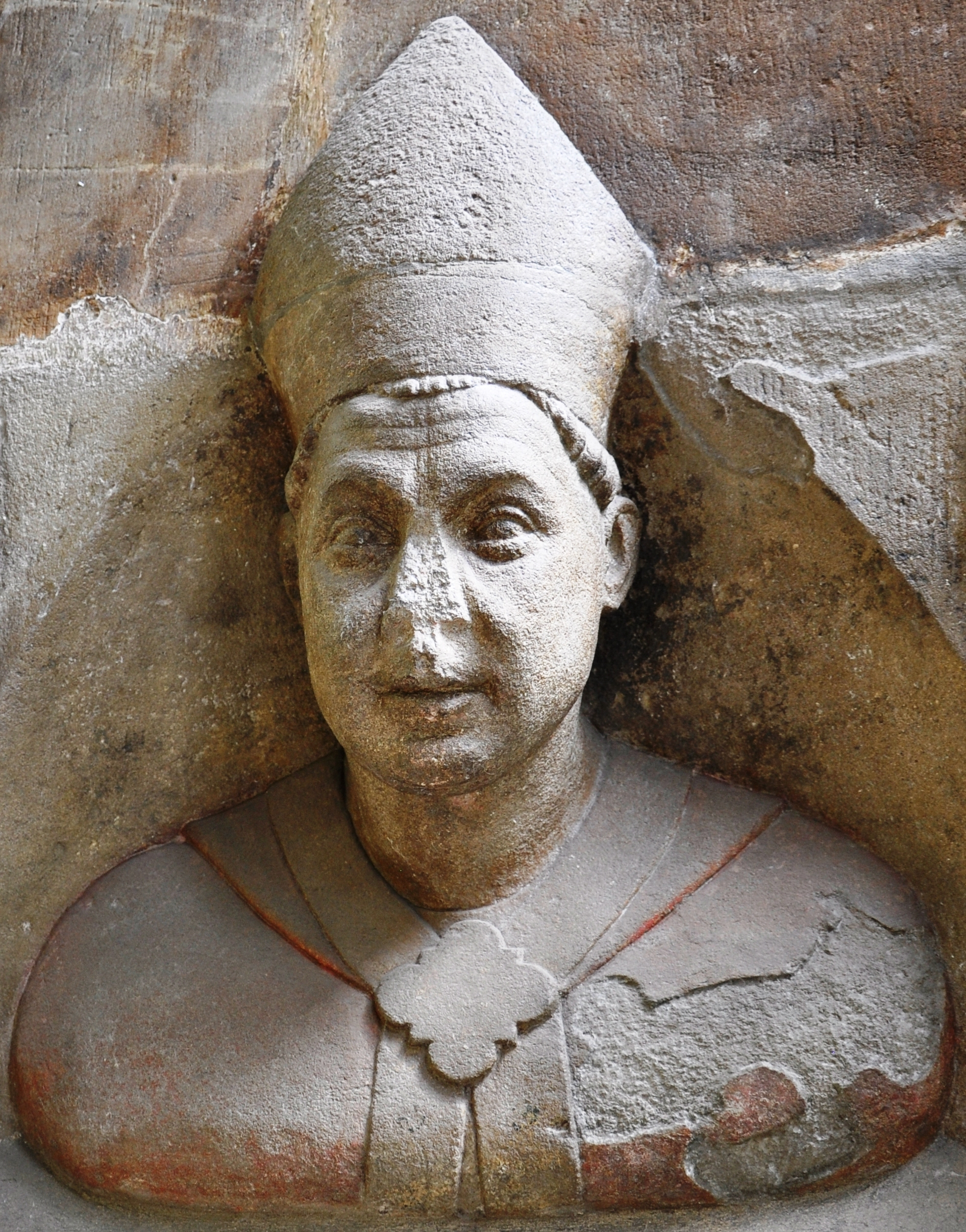
- Bust (sculpture) of Jan of Jenštejn in the St. Vitus Cathedral in Prague
- Native name: Jan z Jenštejna
- Church: Catholic Church
- Archdiocese: Archdiocese of Prague
- In office: 19 March 1379 – 17 June 1400
- Predecessor: Jan Očko of Vlašim
- Successor: Olbram ze Škvorce
- Previous post: Bishop of Meißen (Meissen) (1375-1379)

Personal details
- Born: 1348 Prague, Kingdom of Bohemia, Holy Roman Empire
- Died: 17 June 1400 (aged 51–52) Rome, Papal States

Jan of Jenštejn (also John of Jenstein; Czech: Jan z Jenštejna; (Note: German: Johann II. von Jenstein, Johannes VI. von Jenstein. Johann von Jenzenstein, Johann von Genzenstein) 1348 – 17 June 1400) was a Bohemian archbishop, composer and poet. From 1379 to 1396 he was the Archbishop of Prague. He studied in Bologna, Padua, Montpellier and Paris.

== Life and career ==
Born in 1348 in Prague, to Paul of Jenštejn, a Bohemian esquire who was chief notary for Holy Roman Emperor Charles IV.

he became the owner of the castle Hrádek in 1379. The same year he succeeded to the archbishopric of his uncle Jan Očko z Vlašimi who had stepped down. Soon he became Chancellor to Wenceslaus IV of Bohemia. The next year the capital was struck by a Plague epidemic, which struck him as well. He recovered, but this episode left deep scars on his character and he began to examine theological and philosophical problems at his castle Helfenburk u Úštěka. He had abandoned public life because of a quarrel with Wenceslav IV, which was mainly over the matter of the Popes of Avignon. Jan was still loyal to Pope Urban VI, to whom the king was not. In 1384 he left his chancellor post. The quarrel with the king removed him completely from political life, and he retired to his castle and abandoned the post of archbishop on 2 July 1396. He was succeeded as archbishop by Olbram ze Škvorce.

While on his castle, he fell from a newly built tower and miraculously managed to grab hold of something before falling to the ground.

He died in Rome on 17 June 1400, and all his possessions, including his castle, passed to the Archbishops of Prague.

== Artistic works ==
It can be said that his artistic action is as extensive as his political and religious activities. He organized the costly rebuilding of several castles, especially Jenštejn.

His musical works were compiled in the book Die Hymnen Johanns von Jenstein, Erzbischofs von Prag of Q. M. Dreves. The book was published in German in 1886. His literary activity was very rich and includes not only religious and philosophical works, but also poems.

He influenced literature and music with his own work. His musical activity was not systematic, but rather random. Before 1380 it was often dance music, then religious music.
