= Slatina (Znojmo District) =

- Municipality
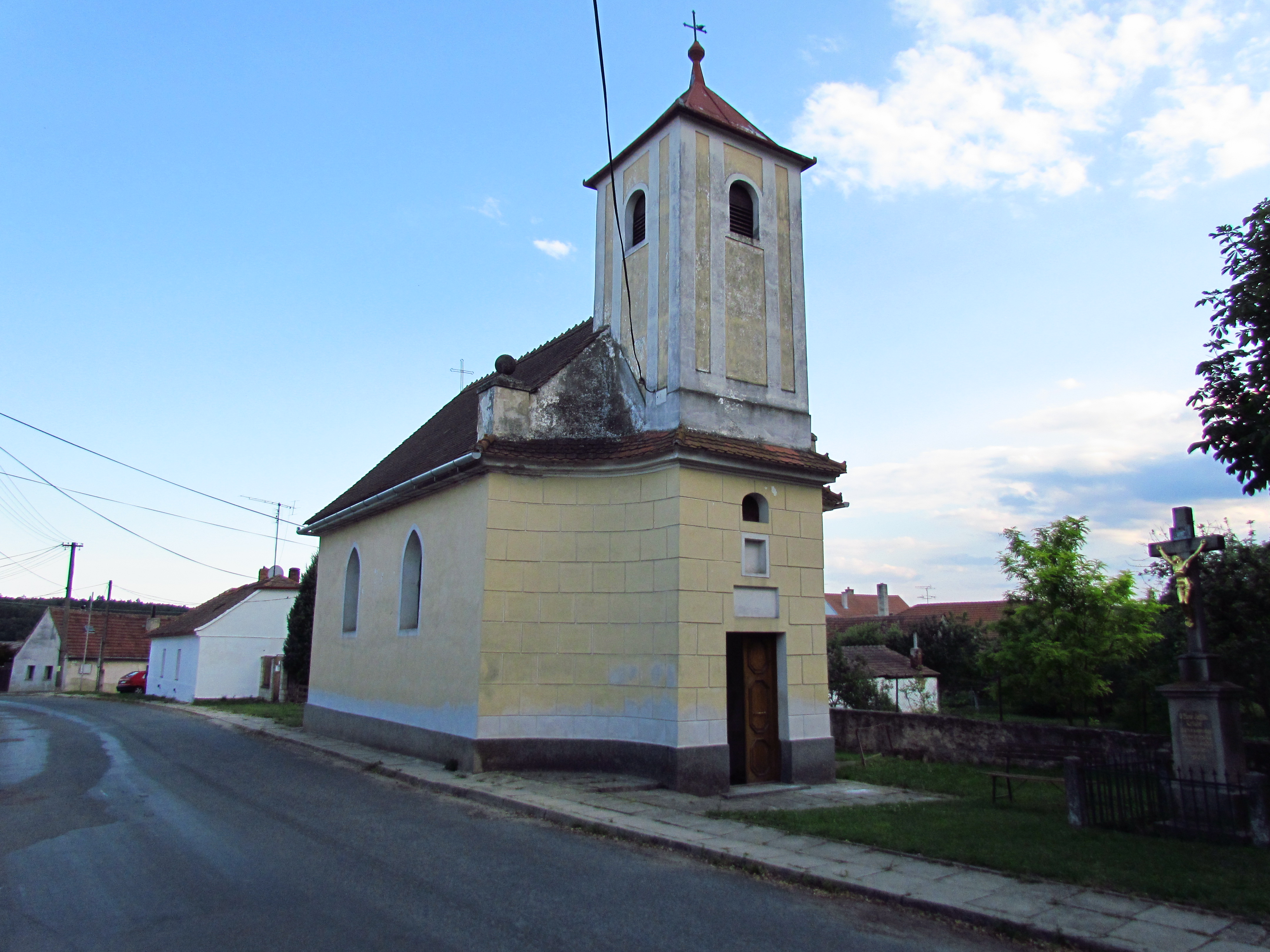
- Chapel of the Holy Trinity

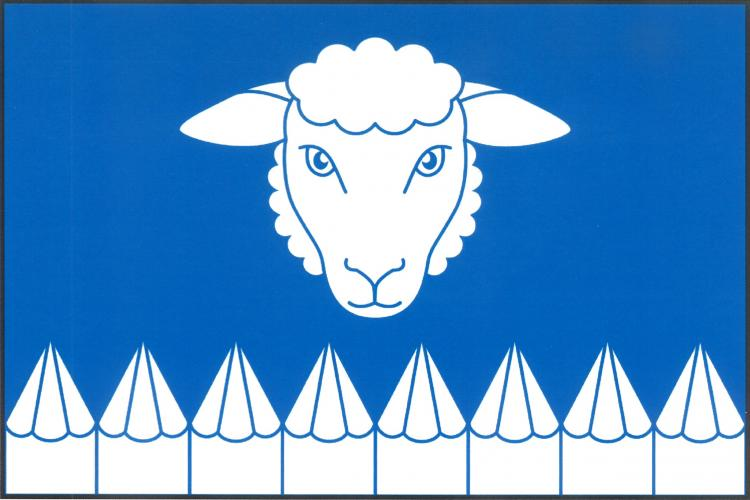
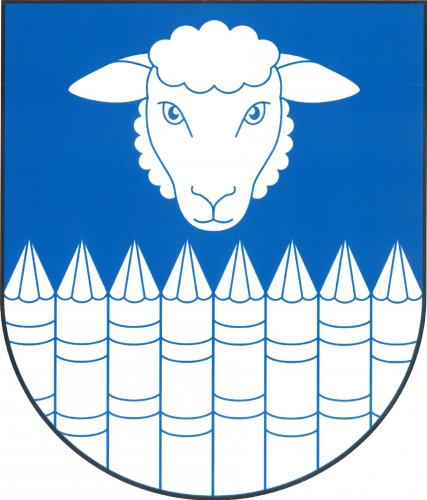
- Flag Coat of arms

- Location in the Czech Republic
- Coordinates: 49°1′11″N 16°1′6″E
- Country: Czech Republic
- Region: South Moravian
- District: Znojmo
- First mentioned: 1287

Area
  - Total: 8.04 km^{2} (3.10 sq mi)
- Elevation: 370 m (1,210 ft)

Population (2026-01-01)
  - Total: 244
  - Density: 30.3/km^{2} (78.6/sq mi)
- Time zone: UTC+1 (CET)
  - Summer (DST): UTC+2 (CEST)
- Postal code: 671 53
- Website: www.obecslatina.net

Slatina (German: Latein) is a municipality and village in Znojmo District in the South Moravian Region of the Czech Republic. It has about 200 inhabitants.

Slatina lies approximately 19 kilometres (12 mi) north of Znojmo, 48 km (30 mi) south-west of Brno, and 166 km (103 mi) south-east of Prague.

== Demographics ==
Historical population
Year	Pop.	±%
1869	337	—
1880	390	+15.7%
1890	369	−5.4%
1900	385	+4.3%
1910	379	−1.6%
1921	403	+6.3%
1930	429	+6.5%
1950	355	−17.2%
1961	378	+6.5%
1970	360	−4.8%
1980	312	−13.3%
1991	263	−15.7%
2001	259	−1.5%
2011	240	−7.3%
2021	229	−4.6%
Source: Censuses
