= Nemyčeves =

- Municipality
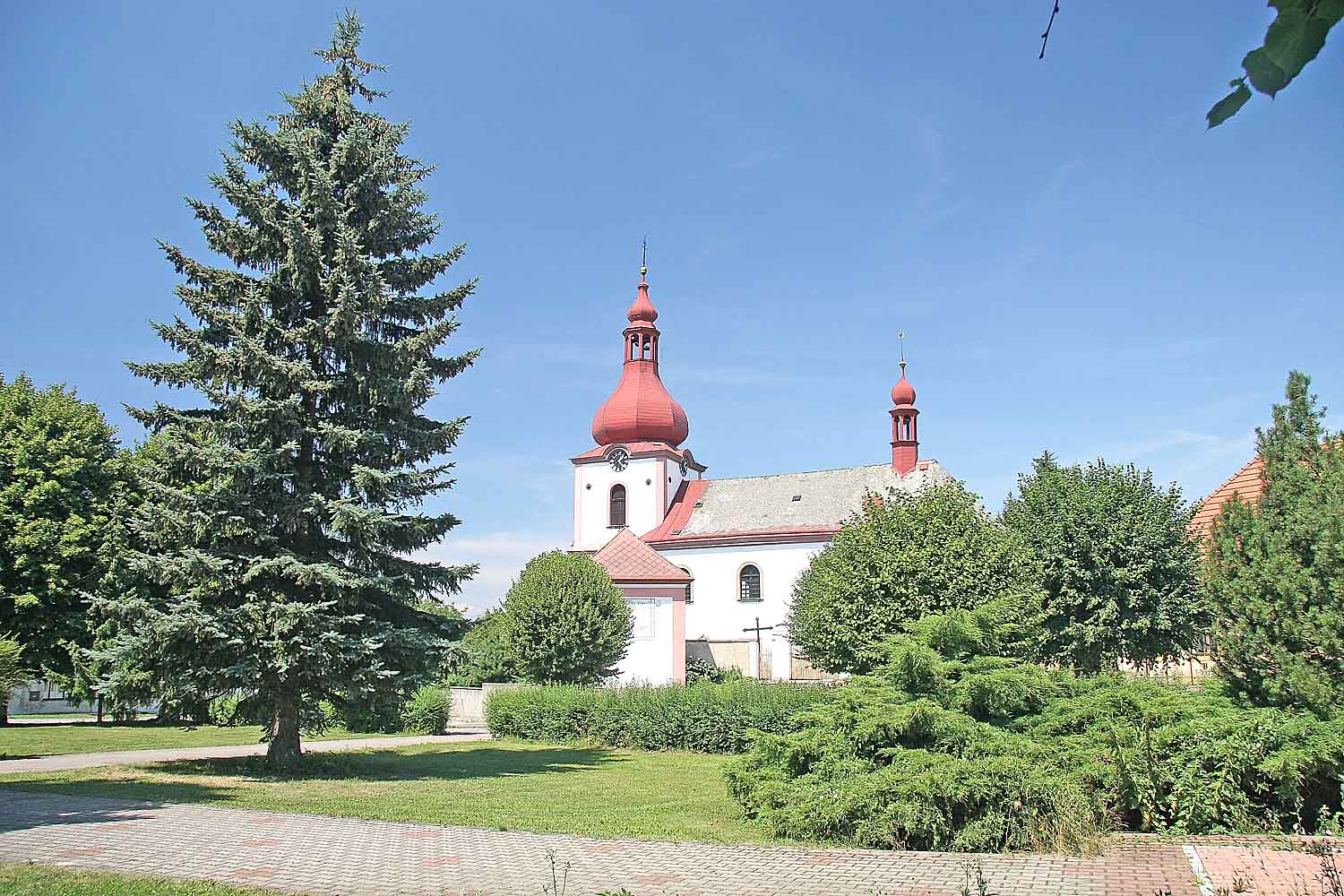
- Church of Saints Peter and Paul

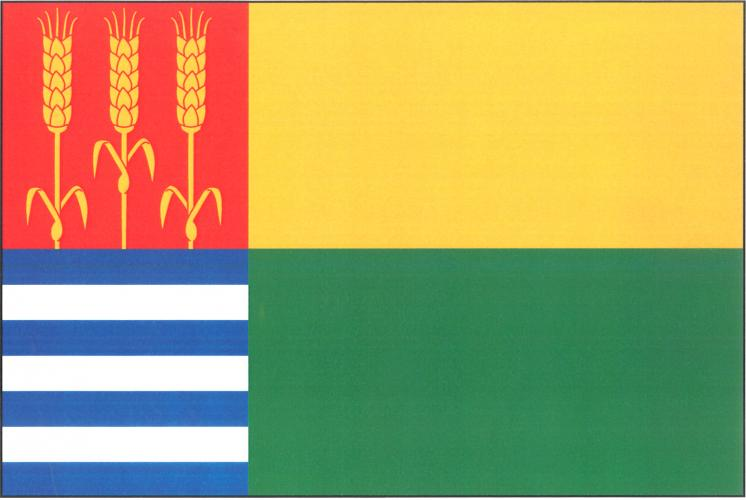
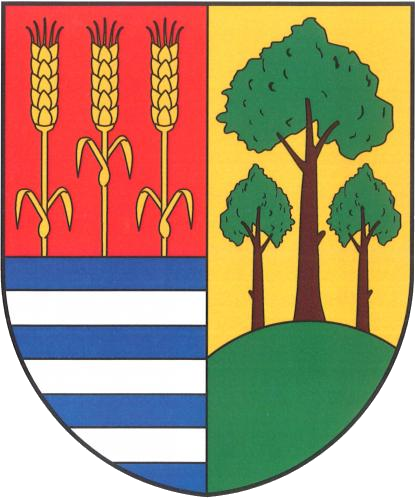
- Flag Coat of arms

- Location in the Czech Republic
- Coordinates: 50°23′4″N 15°22′12″E
- Country: Czech Republic
- Region: Hradec Králové
- District: Jičín
- First mentioned: 1340

Area
  - Total: 4.97 km^{2} (1.92 sq mi)
- Elevation: 282 m (925 ft)

Population (2026-01-01)
  - Total: 352
  - Density: 70.8/km^{2} (183/sq mi)
- Time zone: UTC+1 (CET)
  - Summer (DST): UTC+2 (CEST)
- Postal code: 506 01
- Website: www.nemyceves.cz

Nemyčeves is a municipality and village in Jičín District in the Hradec Králové Region of the Czech Republic. It has about 400 inhabitants.

== Demographics ==
Historical population
Year	Pop.	±%
1869	679	—
1880	693	+2.1%
1890	755	+8.9%
1900	753	−0.3%
1910	703	−6.6%
1921	666	−5.3%
1930	640	−3.9%
1950	519	−18.9%
1961	481	−7.3%
1970	413	−14.1%
1980	338	−18.2%
1991	254	−24.9%
2001	274	+7.9%
2011	338	+23.4%
2021	344	+1.8%
Source: Censuses
