= Jan Očko of Vlašim =

- Cardinal-Priest of Santi XII Apostoli
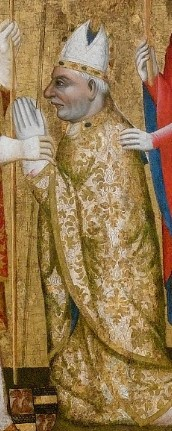
- Portrait in the Votive Panel of Jan Očko of Vlašim
- Native name: Jan Očko z Vlašimi
- Church: Catholic Church
- See: Santi XII Apostoli
- In office: 18 September 1378 – 14 January 1380
- Predecessor: Robert of Geneva
- Successor: Fernando Pérez Calvillo
- Previous posts: Archbishop of Prague (1364-1379); Bishop of Olomouc (1351-1364)

Orders
- Consecration: 13 April 1352 by Arnošt of Pardubice
- Created cardinal: 18 September 1378 by Pope Urban VI

Personal details
- Born: Vlašim, Kingdom of Bohemia, Holy Roman Empire
- Died: 14 January 1380 Prague, Kingdom of Bohemia, Holy Roman Empire

Jan Očko of Vlašim (Czech: Jan Očko z Vlašimi; Jan VIII as the Bishop of Olomouc) (? – died 1380), from the family of the House of Vlašim, was the second Archbishop of Prague (1364–1378). He was the uncle to his successor Jan of Jenštejn.

== Biography ==
=== Early life ===
It is not known when he was born. His father was Jan of Kamenice, the secretary of the King John of Bohemia. His brothers were Michael of Vlašim, Burgrave of Svojanov, and Pavel of Vlašim and Jenštejn, Grand Chamberlain.

=== Bishop ===
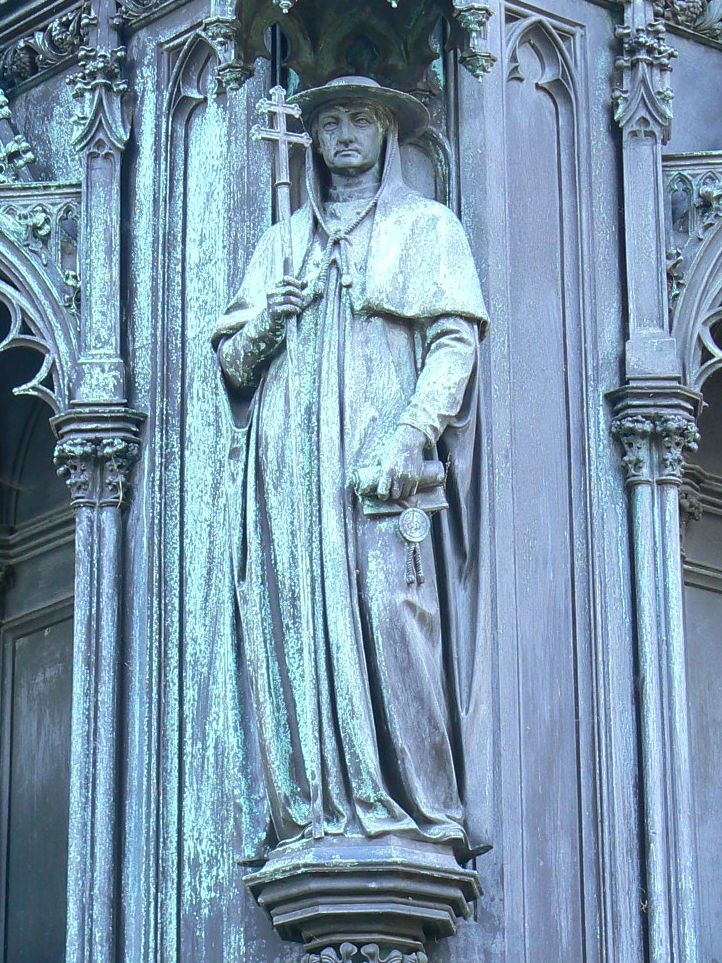
Jan Očko of Vlašim as a cardinal (detail of the pedestal of the statue of Charles IV; Křižovnické Square, Prague)

As of 1351, Jan Očko was the Bishop of Olomouc. His coat of arms was that of bishop and silver two Vulture heads gules (common with of Vlašim and Jenštejn).

At that time, he became an advisor to Charles IV. He later accompanied Charles IV on his way to Italy in 1355. On 12 July 1364, he became the Archbishop of Prague, succeeding the dead Arnošt of Pardubice.

In 1368, he was regent of the Kingdom of Bohemia.

He consecrated the Church of Saint Thomas in Brno (13 March 1356) and the Emmaus monastery in Prague on 29 March 1372.

In 1366 he ordered the incarceration of Jan Milíč z Kroměříže for his preachings against Charles IV, whom he called the "Antichrist". Jan Milíč was later freed by Charles and remained in his favour.

=== Cardinal ===
On 18 September 1378, by nomination of Pope Urban VI, he became the first Bohemian named a Cardinal. On 30 November 1379, he abandoned the post of Archbishop. According to Konrad Eubel, Joannes de Jenzenstein was appointed to succeed him on 19 March 1379.

He was the bailor of the castle Kašperk.

=== Death ===
He died on 14 January 1380.

== See also ==
- Vlašim family
- The Votive Panel of Jan Očko of Vlašim
