= Michal Olšiak =

Czech sculptor

- Born: 1978 (age 46–47); Žďár nad Sázavou, Czechoslovakia
- Known for: Sculptor, painter

Michal Olšiak (born 1978) is a Czech sculptor and painter.

== Biography ==
Olšiak was born in 1978 and went to high school in Žďár nad Sázavou. After graduating from high school took up painting and sculpting and also travelled often. Author of dozens of concrete, sand, and stone sculptures, installed especially in the region around his birthplace but also around the Czech Republic, in Germany and Italy. Professional freelance sculptor since 2006 and since April 2013 has own gallery in Veselská street in Žďár nad Sázavou. The gallery moved to Republic square two years later. In 2021 created sand sculptures with a team as part of the exhibition "Cesta do fantazie" in Lednice.

== Criticism ==
In 2015 a group of about 40 artists led by Jaroslav Grodl, curator of Vysočina Regional Gallery in Jihlava protested installation of Michal Olšiak's sculpture Zubr in Bystřice nad Pernštejnem. In their open letter to the town council they argued that the statue is shallow tourist attraction, and public art commissions are in the hands of incompetents casing hardly reversible damage and unnatural deformation of the public space. Grodl also expressed indignation that the sculptures are made without input from experts causing disparagement of historically significant locations. The director of town museum in Bystřice nad Pernštejnem Vladimír Cisák, alleged Olšiak's sculptures destroy the landscape and do not belong to Žďárské vrchy Protected Landscape Area. In spite of criticism the statue was revealed on 20 September 2015. Town Bystřice nad Pernštejnem paid 200 thousand CZK for the commission.

== Sculptures ==
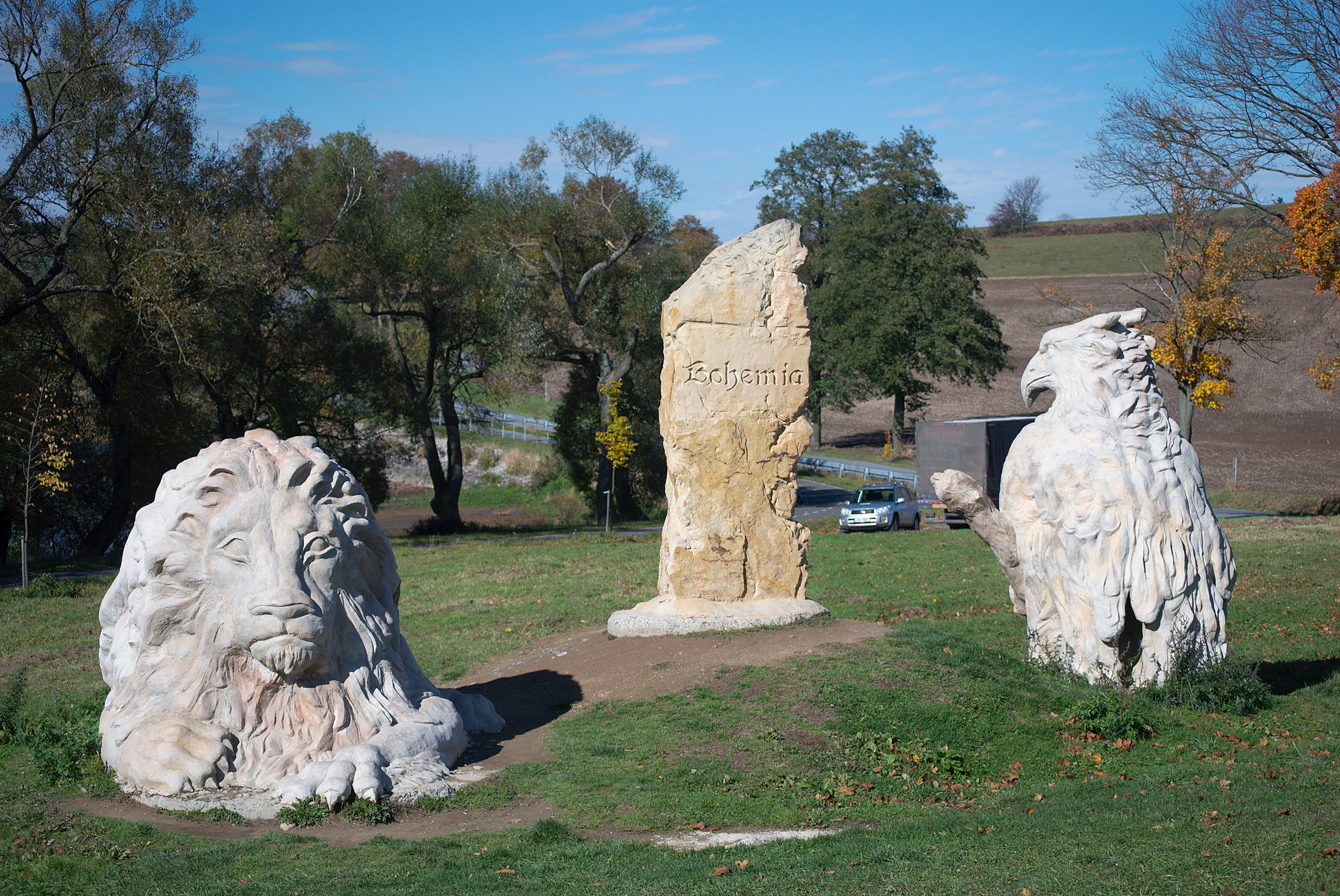
Sculptures Hraniční kámen ("border stone")

- Abstrakce–žena
- Býk (bull) on the premises of slaughterhouse Maso Brejcha in Blovice (2011)
- Čertův stolek (devil's table) in Chotěboř (2013)
- Drak (dragon) Ronov nad Sázavou (2012)
- Duběnka in Lom Svatá Anna in Měšice u Tábora (2014)
- Fontána (fountain) at Rychnov
- Gryf (gryphon) at castle Pohled (2014)
- Hamroň at Hamry nad Sázavou (2007)
- Hejkal Pepino in Tři Studně at guesthouse Zátiší (2012)
- Houby (mushrooms) at guesthouse Fryšava in Fryšava pod Žákovou horou (2013)
- Hraniční kámen (border stone - referring to historical border of Bohemia and Moravia lands) at Žďár nad Sázavou (on the dam Pilská nádrž; 2009)
- Hroši in Škrdlovice at hotel U Hrocha (2008)
- Charlie Chaplin at vinery U Charlieho in Žďár nad Sázavou (2011)
- Chodský pes at restaurant Chodská chalupa on hill Hrádek at Újezda, near Domažlice (2011)
- Chrt (greyhound)
- Jelen (stag) at Slavětín (2012)
- Josefína at guesthouse U Strašilů v Hluboké (2012)
- Káně (buzzard) u hotelu Horník v lyžařském areálu Tři Studně (2013)
- Kavka (jackdaw) at playground in Sazomín (2017)
- Klafar Rak in Račín (2008)
- Krbový mužíček in local settlement Yukon (2007)
- Krkavec (raven) in Bítov at restaurant and lookout tower Rumburak (2008)
- Krystal on premises of Berlova vápenka in Třemošnice (2014)
- Kůň (horse) in Hamry nad Sázavou at riding club Na Ranči (2007)
- Mamlas at Žďár nad Sázavou (2005)
- Mamut (mammoth) between Hamry nad Sázavou and Rozštípená skála (2006)
- Pohádkový koník at ranch Ztracená podkova in Dobronín (2013)
- Rozcestník Dařbucha on dam of Velké Dářko (2011)
- Rumburak in Bítov at restaurant and lookout tower Rumburak, close to scultpture Krkavec (2013)
- Slon (elephant) in Sázava (2012)
- Strom (tree) or Poděšínská brokolice in Poděšín (2010)
- Stromový mužík at guesthouse U Stromového mužíka in Studenec (2016)
- Sv. Florián on the building of firefihouse SDH Nové Město na Moravě (2010)
- Veles at restaurant Rybí dům in Chotěbuz (2012)
- Výr (eagle-owl) in local settlement Yukon at Sykovec (2006)
- Zběhlík at guesthouse U Zběhlíka in Čistá (2012)
- Zubr in Bystřice nad Pernštejnem (2015)
- Žába in Tršice at Olomouc (2009)
- Žába – pítko (frog - drinking fountain) on the waterfront of Říčka in Šlapanice (2014)
- Želva at church Navštívení Panny Marie in Obyčtov (2010)

== Gallery ==
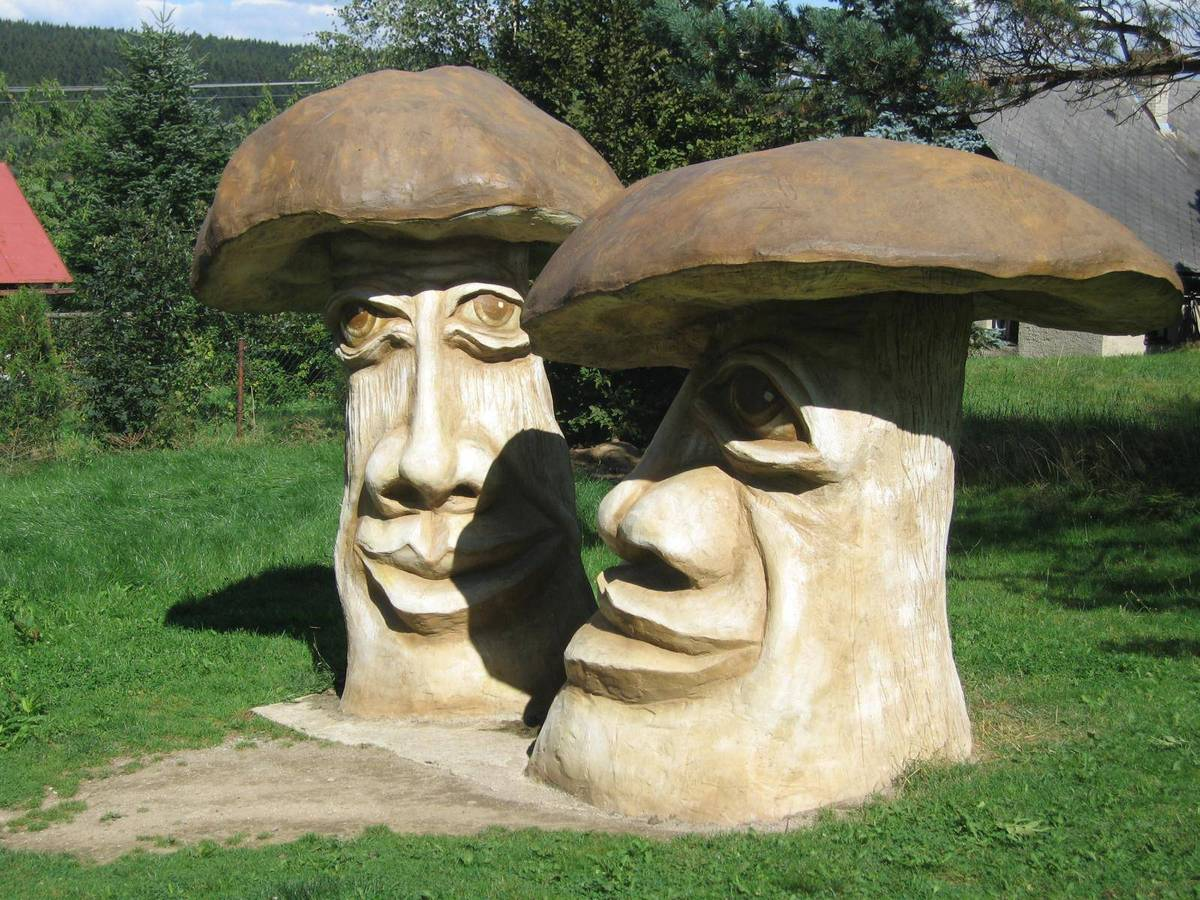
Houby (2013)

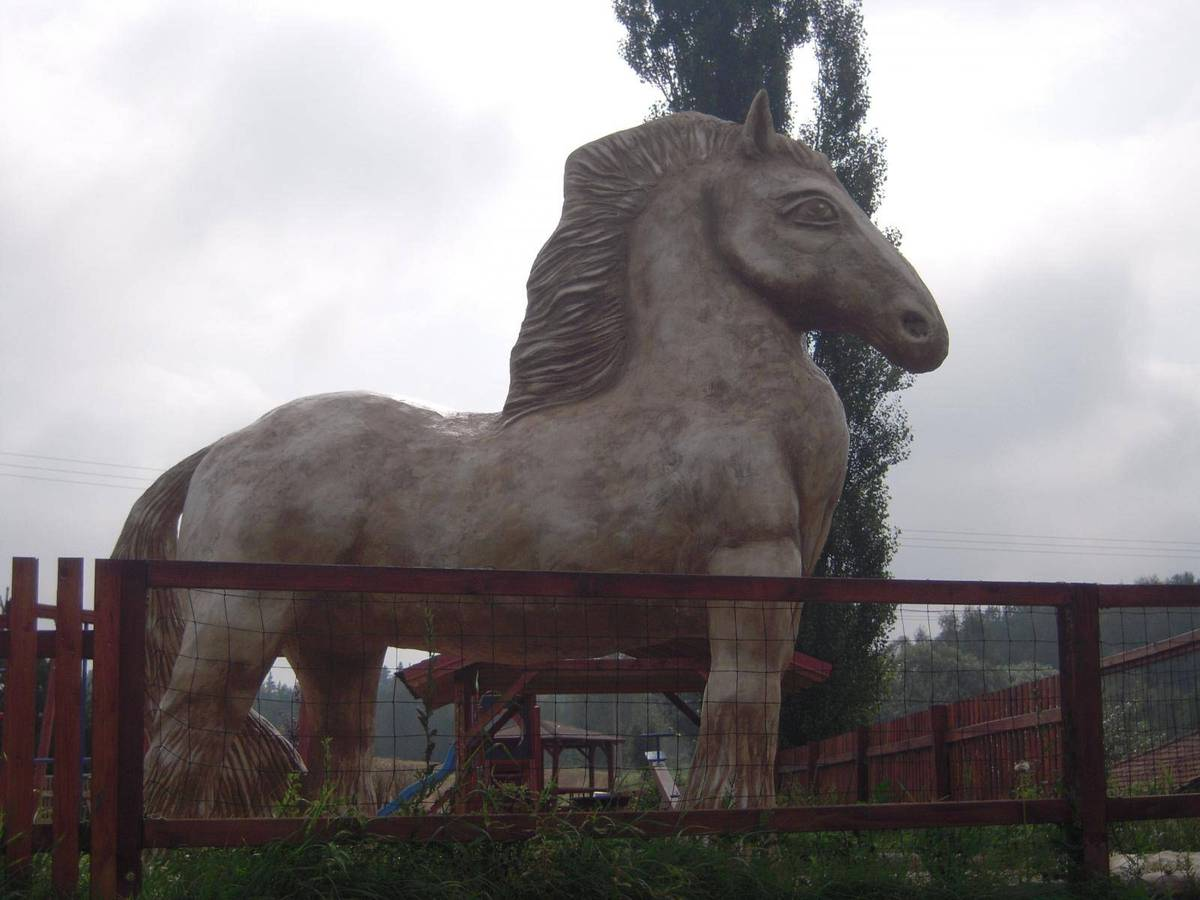
Pohádkový koník (2013)

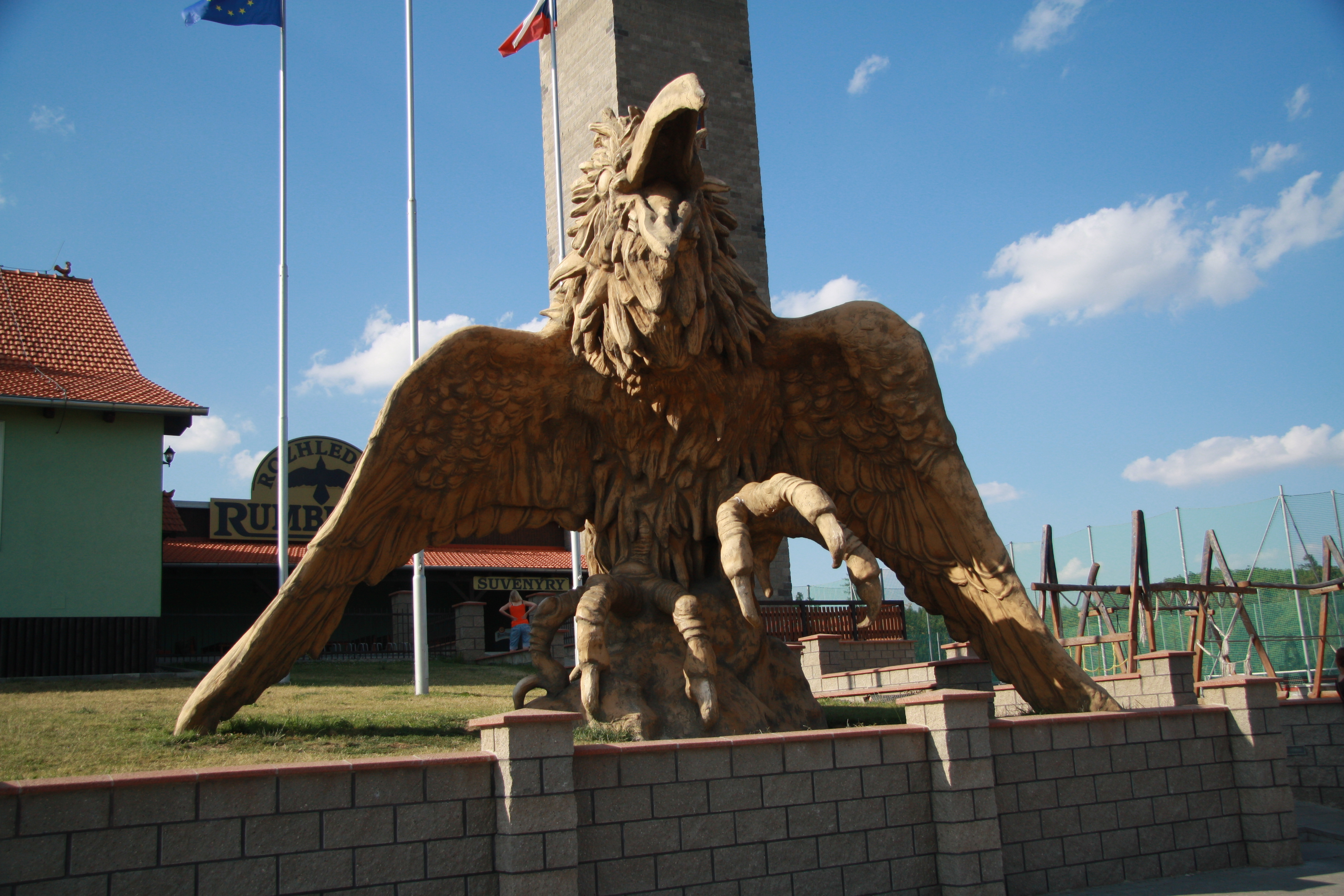
Rumburak (2013)

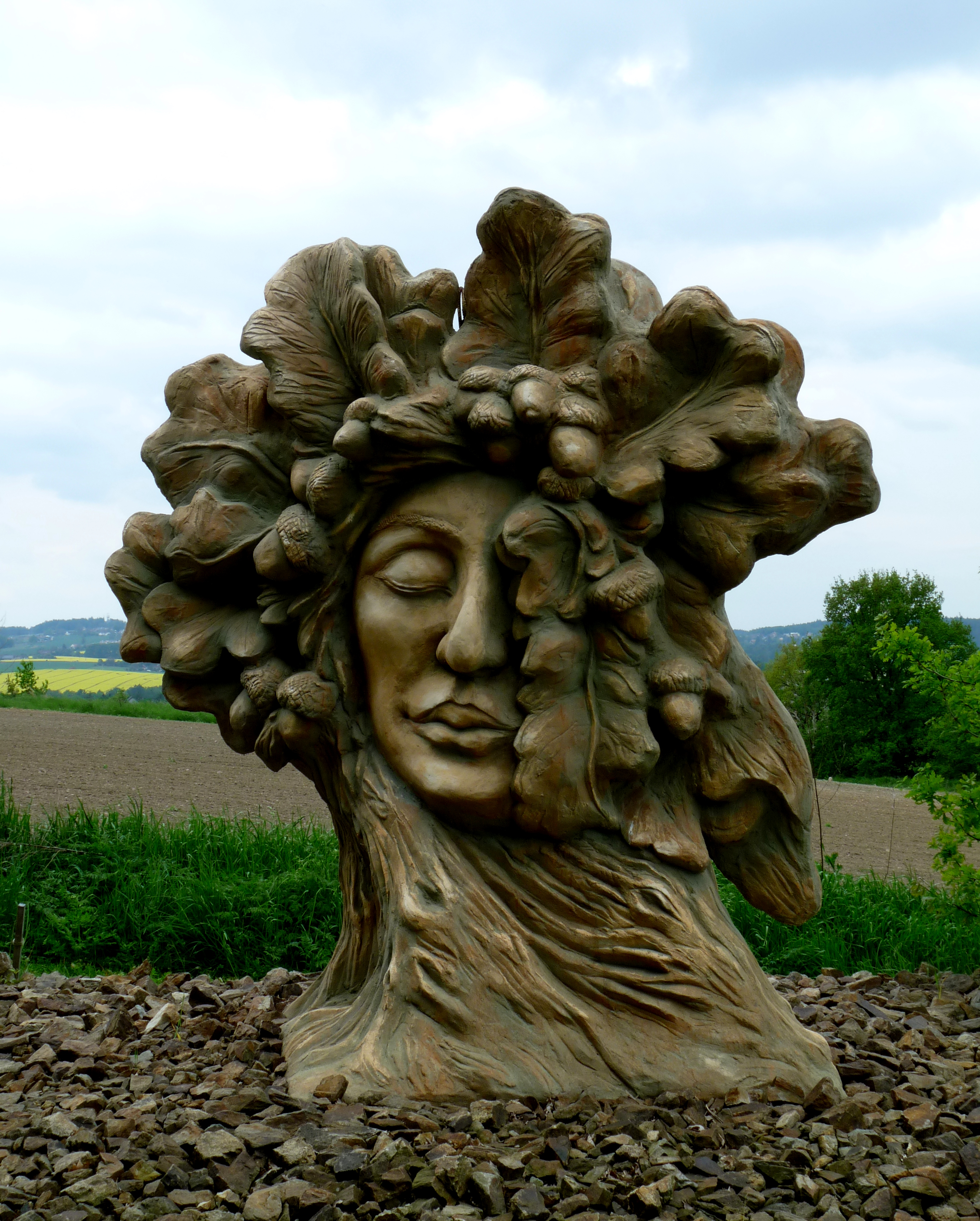
Duběnka (2014)

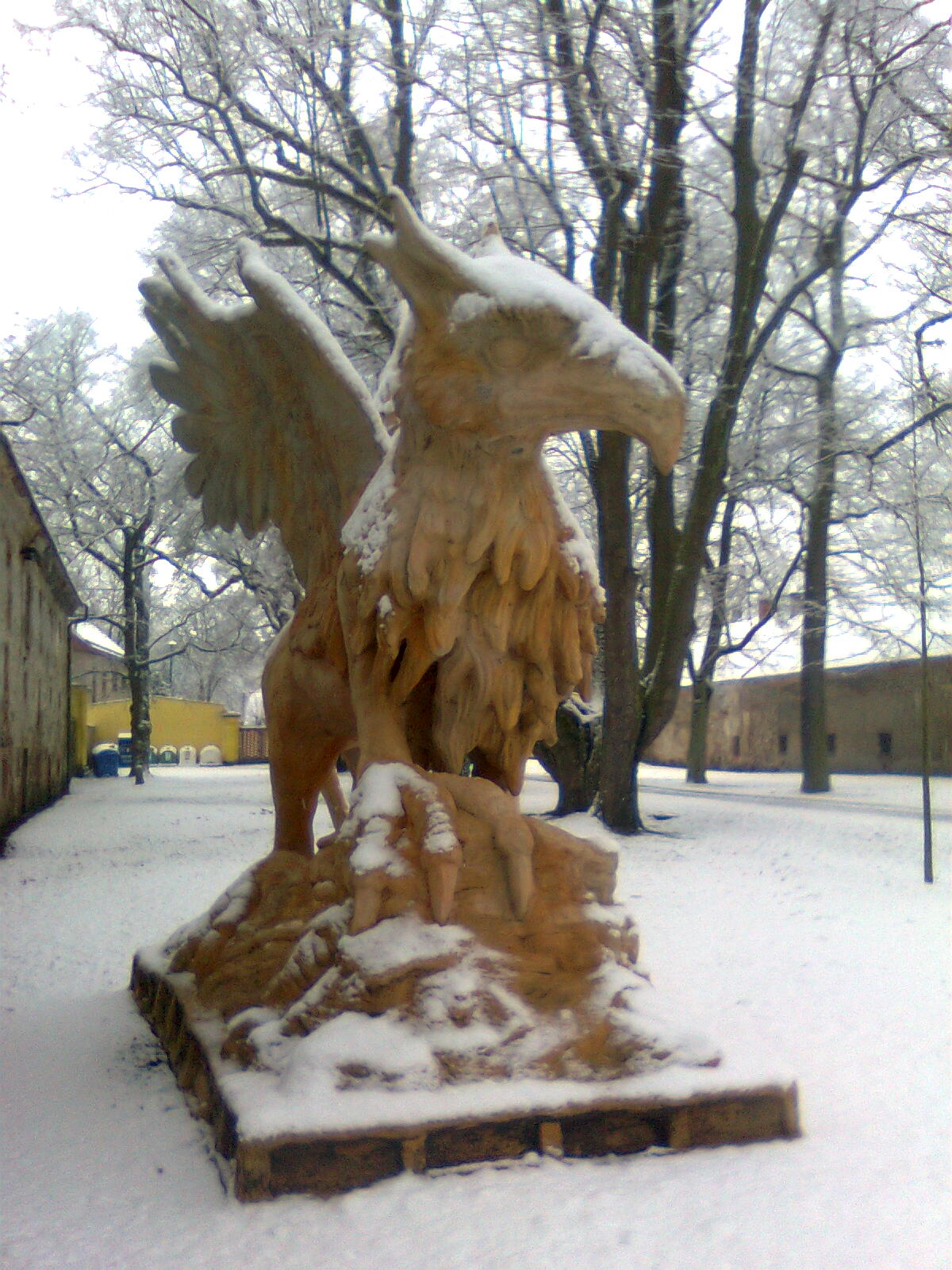
Gryf (2014)

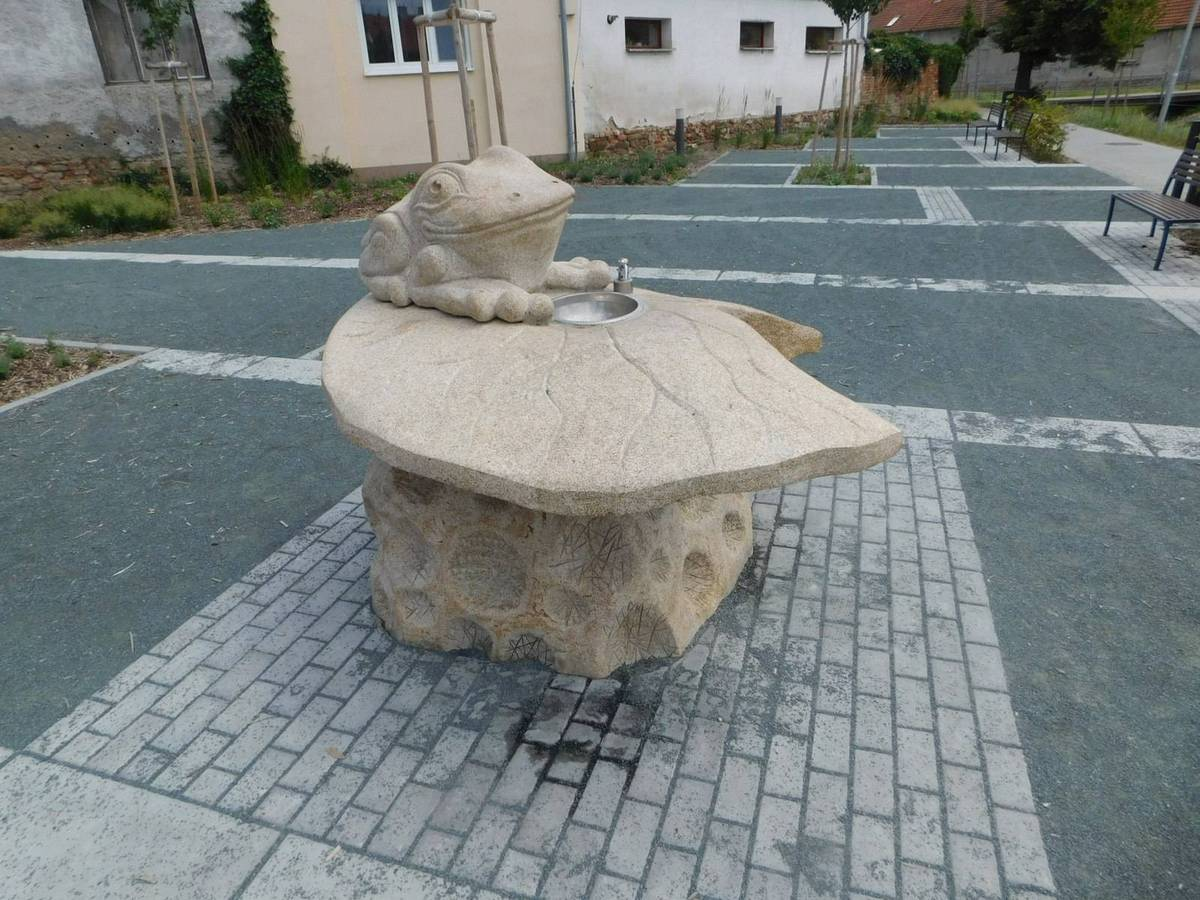
Žába–pítko (2014)

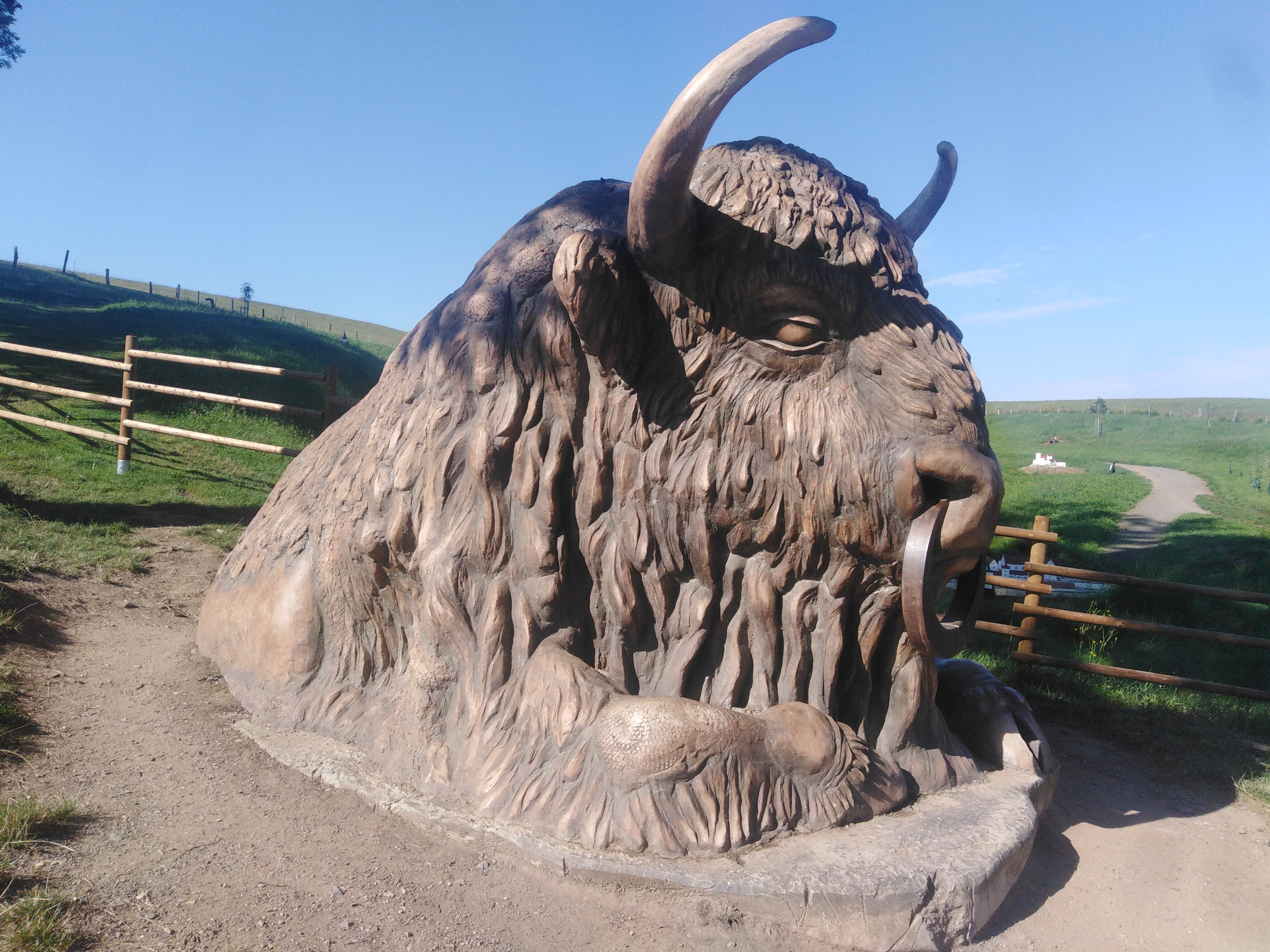
Zubr (2015)

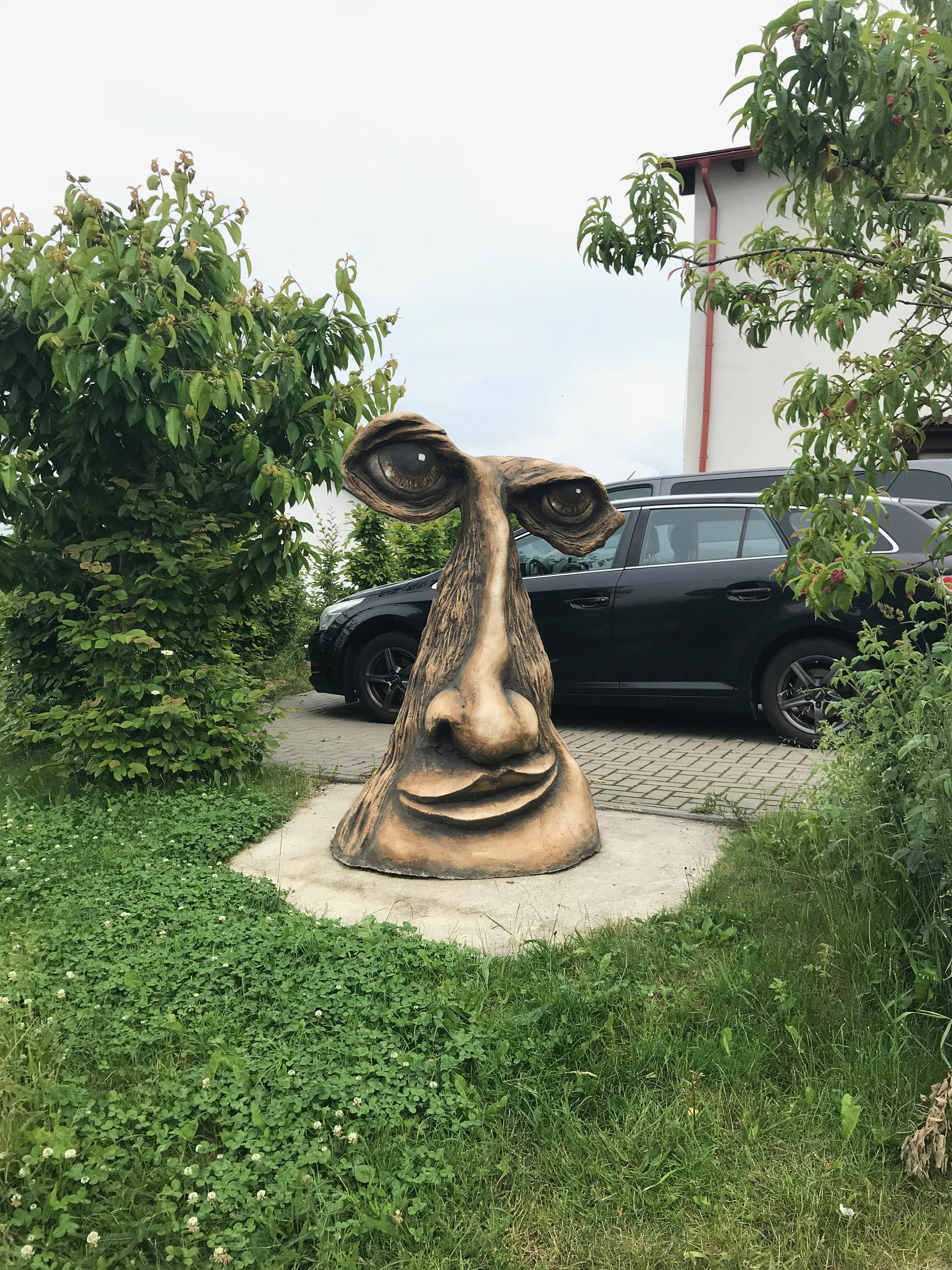
Stromový mužík (2016)
