= Cornštejn Castle =

Castle in the Czech Republic

- Bítov; Moravia
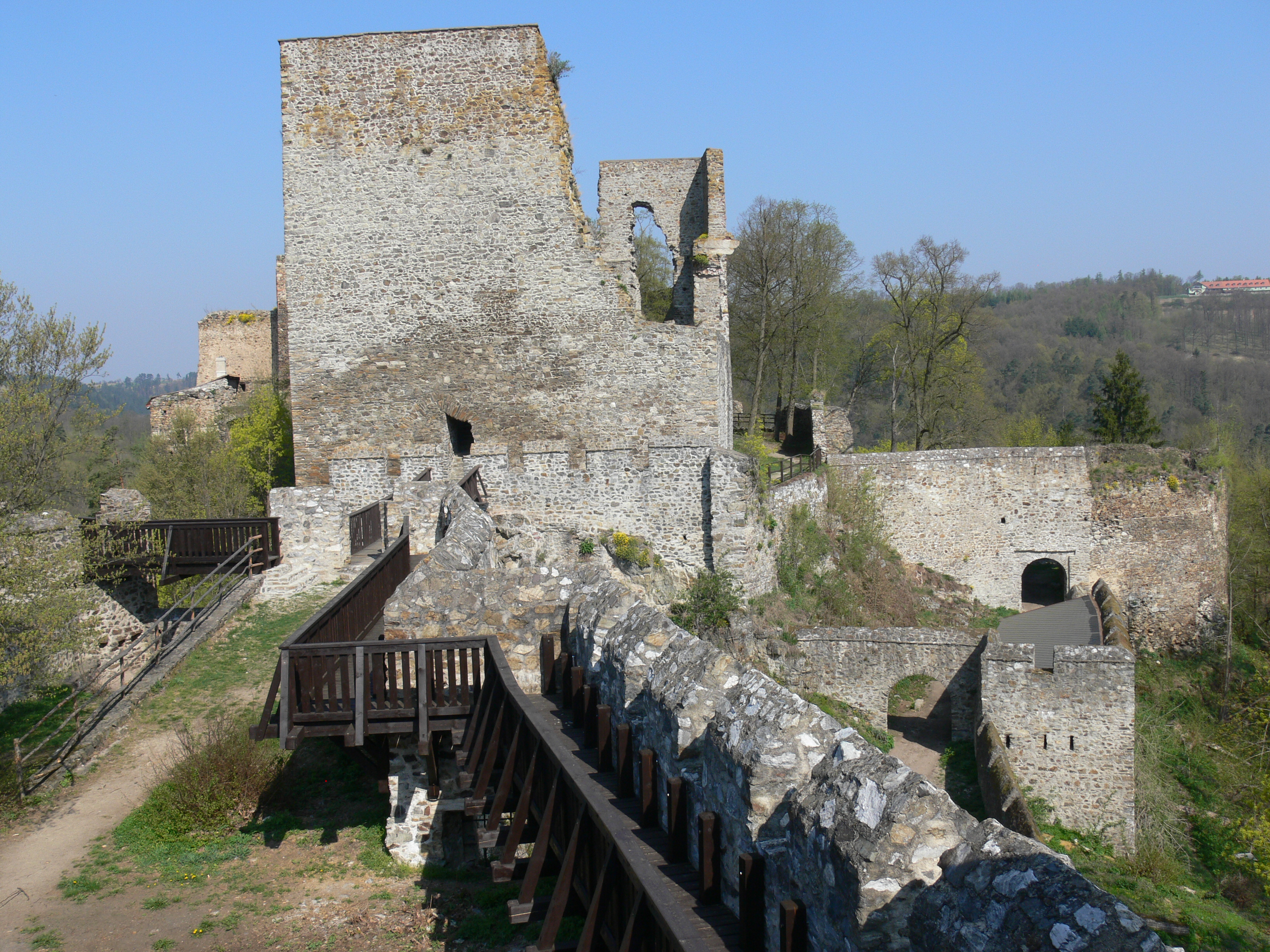
- The ruins of Cornštejn Castle

Site information
- Type: Castle
- Owner: South Moravian Museum in Znojmo
- Controlled by: March of Moravia
- Open to the public: June to September daily
- Condition: Ruins (partially reconstructed)

Location
- Coordinates: 48°56′03″N 15°42′55″E

Site history
- Built: Early 14th century Last fortifications 1542
- Built by: Raimund of Lichtenburg
- Materials: stone
- Events: Notable events in the castle's life: 1463/1464 11 months` siege by the troops of Moravian Estates

Cornštejn Castle (Czech: hrad Cornštejn or Cornštýn, Corštejn, Corštýn, German: Zornstein) is a castle near Bítov, 31 kilometres (19 mi) west of Znojmo, in south-west Moravia, the Czech Republic.

Surrounded by magnificent landscape of the Dyje (Thaya) River Valley, Cornštejn Castle stands on a strategic location, not far from an Eneolithic fortified settlement. Though in ruins now, it still shows what a lofty medieval residence and fortress it once was. The Dyje (Thaya) River, now impounded by Vranov Dam, flows around the castle in a big meander. The name of the castle is derived from German "Zorn" (anger) and "Stein" (stone).

== History ==
It was built on royal demesne land which was subordinated to Bítov Castle and which was pawned and later (1308) granted as a fief to the noble family of Lichtenburg. In the 1320s Raimund of Lichtenburg, King Wenceslaus II’s favourite, decided to strengthen the security of Bítov Castle and the road connecting Bítov with Vranov Castle by building a fort – Zornstein / Cornštejn, to provide for Raimund’s sons as well. According to the instrument issued by Moravian Margrave Charles on 31 May 1343, Raimund`s sons Smil and Czenek were allowed to divide their father’s demesne with "Vethow" and "Czornstein" castles. This is the first written record of Cornštejn.

Originally a small Gothic noble residence with a Courtyard, a high enclosing wall (Enceinte) and a palace (guarded by a high shield-wall) gradually developed into a large medieval fortress. In the latter half of 14th century Henry of Lichtenburg built a pre-wall around the whole castle, which is how the Upper Bailey came to being. In the first third of 15th century Albrecht and John of Lichtenburg and Zornstein erected another palace on the other side of the Courtyard and established the Lower Ward with barracks and some other buildings, surrounded by a new ring of curtain walls with two new gates and two bastions. In 1422 the castle was besieged by the Hussite troops, which afterwards made the lords of the castle fortify the dangerous strategic hill south of Cornštejn with a detached outwork. The Lichtenburg Family had become very powerful by that time. John of Lichtenburg even dared to wage war with Austrian lords and oppose to Holy Roman King Frederick III. Also John`s son Hynek of Lichtenburg was very powerful. Supported by Pope Pius II, he denied allegiance to King George of Bohemia, and stood up to him in 1463. In turn, Hynek was declared a traitor by the Moravian Diet and his fortress Cornštejn was assaulted. However, Cornštejn turned out to be impossible to be stormed in a few days! The siege lasted eleven months in the end! For Hynek, the power of Pope ius II proved to be of no avail. King George punished Hynek and confiscated the castle. Cornštejn was subsequently granted to Wolfgang Kraiger of Kraigk who reconstructed the castle and modernised both the palaces. His sons Lipolt and Henry then built an up-to-date advanced fort on the rocky platform south of the castle, reflecting latest trends in artillery warfare. After 1526 the castle got back into the hands of the Lichtenburgs of Bítov. In 1542 the Moravian Estates ordered that Cornštejn be repaired and improved so as to withstand a possible Turkish assault. Fortunately, the Ottoman army never made it to southern Moravia, and Cornštejn was spared.

== Post-medieval status ==
However, the time of medieval castles was over by the late 16th century and there was no need to maintain Gothic fortresses any longer. After the Lichtenburgs died out in 1576, the new owners – Streuns of Schwarzenau abandoned the castle and may have removed the rooves to not pay tax. The castle began to fall into ruin, and none of the noble families who owned the castle after the Streuns—Jankovský of Vlašim (1617), Counts von Daun (1788), and the Haases von Hasenfels (1912)—made any changes. Czechoslovak president Edvard Beneš decreed the confiscation of the castle from the Haases in 1945, and it was nationalised. were reconstructed by The Monument Preservation Institute in Brno reconstructed two thirds of the castle in the early 1970s. It has been administered and maintained by the South Moravian Museum in Znojmo since 1987. The castle ruins have been stabilised and open to public since 1998.

== Gallery ==
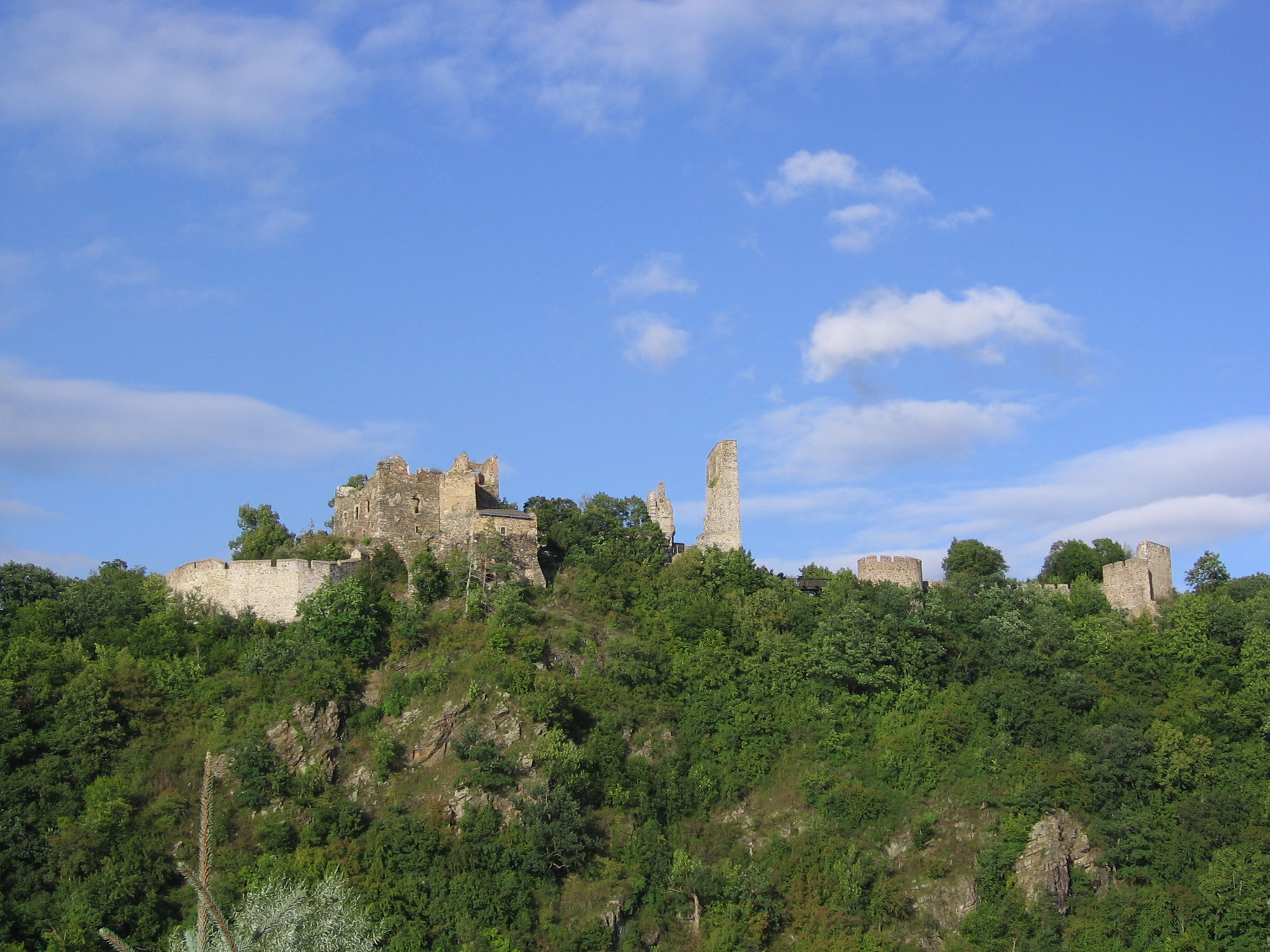
Cornstejn Castle from the SW

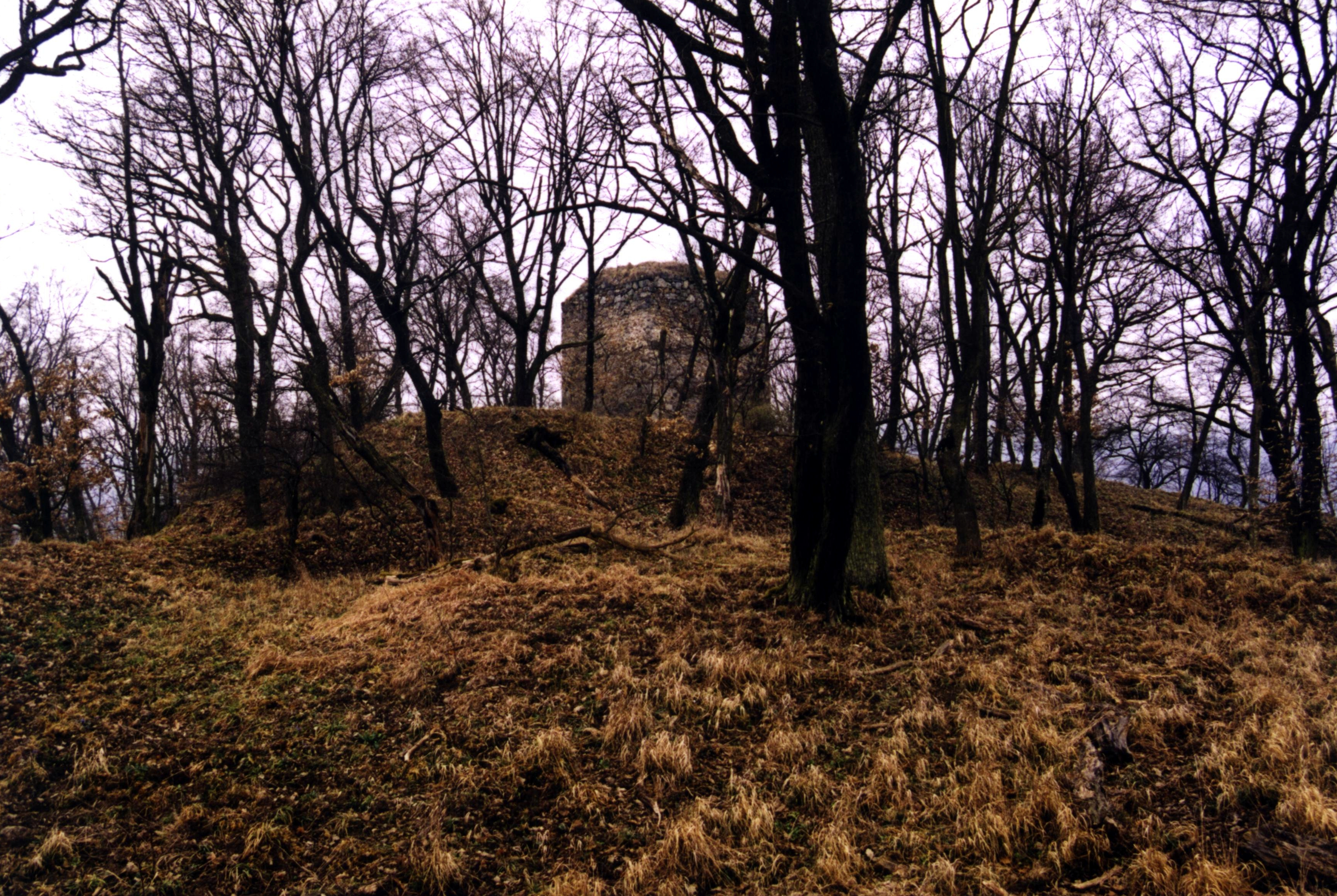
A 15th-century detached outwork on the hill south of Cornštejn Castle

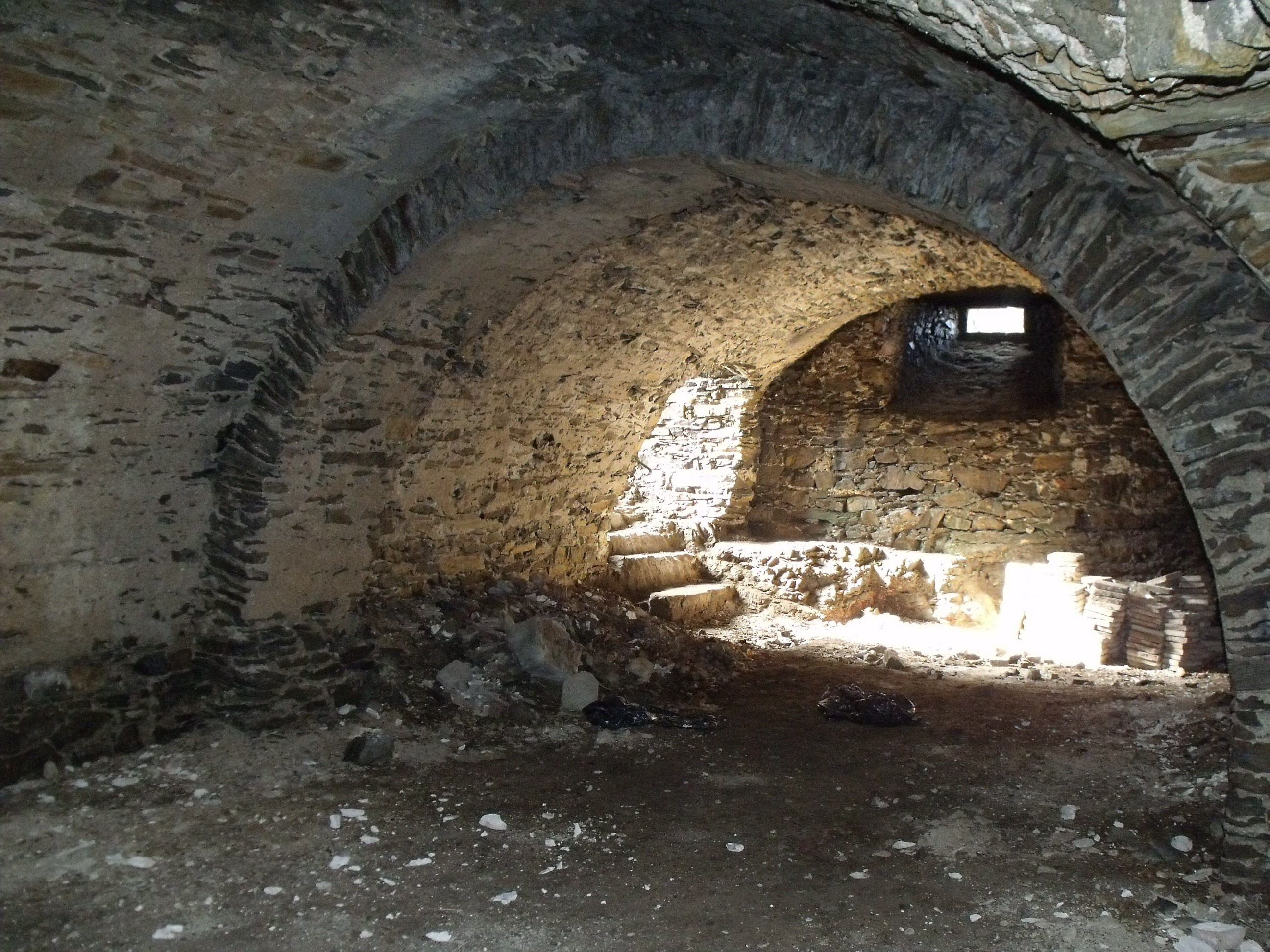
The cellar of the New Palace

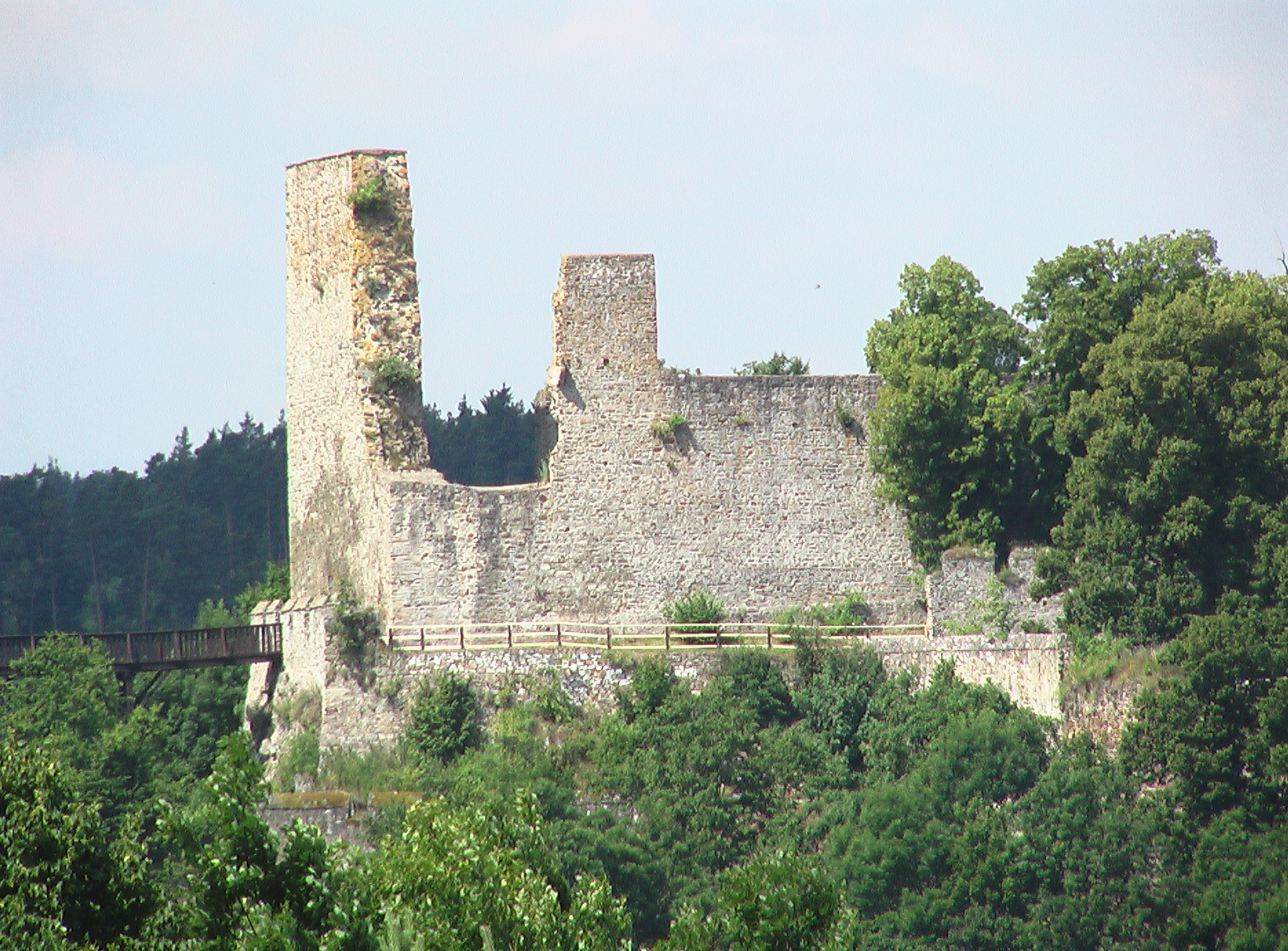
The Old Palace with a part of the Upper Bailey

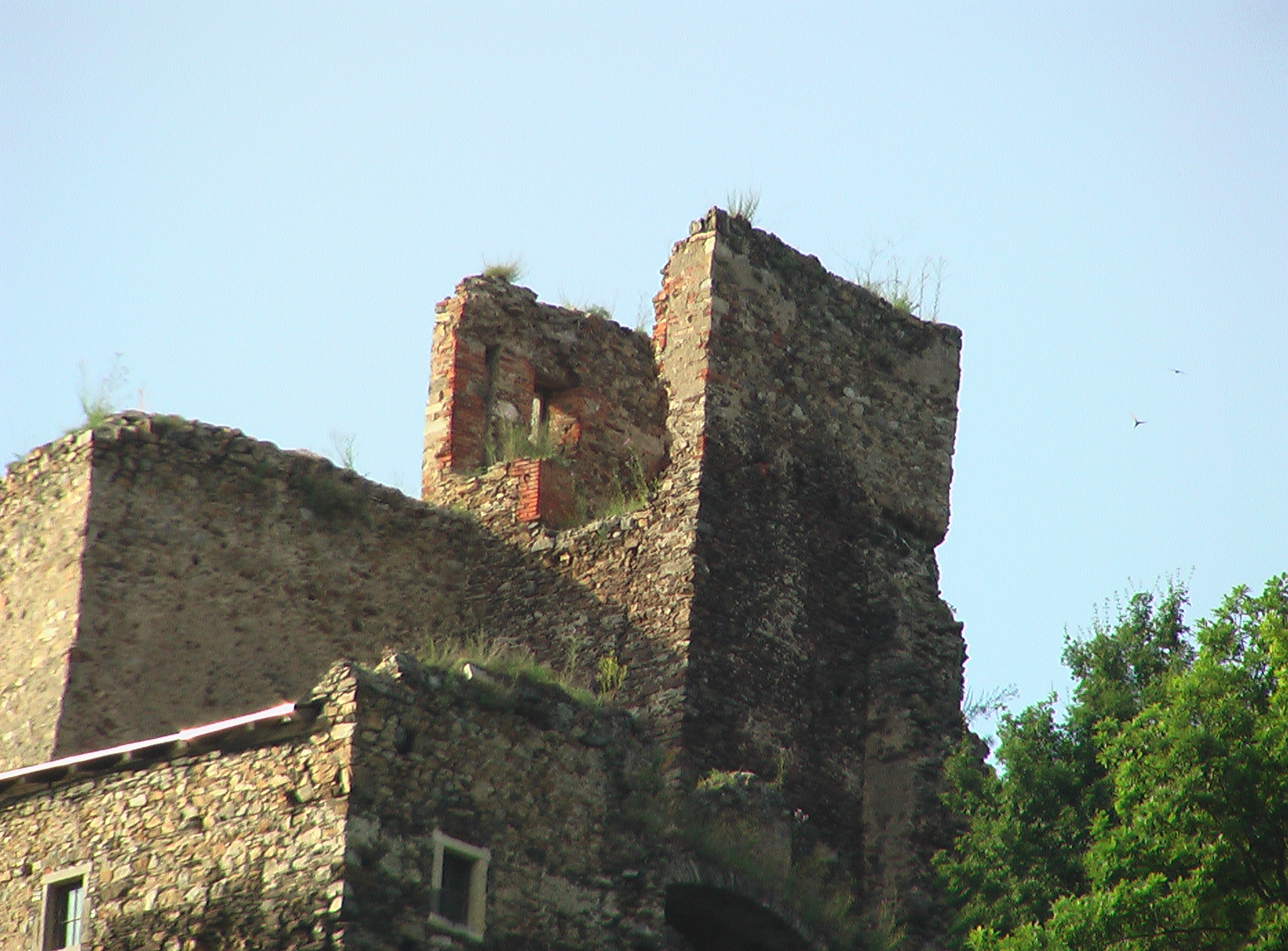
The Tower House, the Sixth Gate and the Guard Room

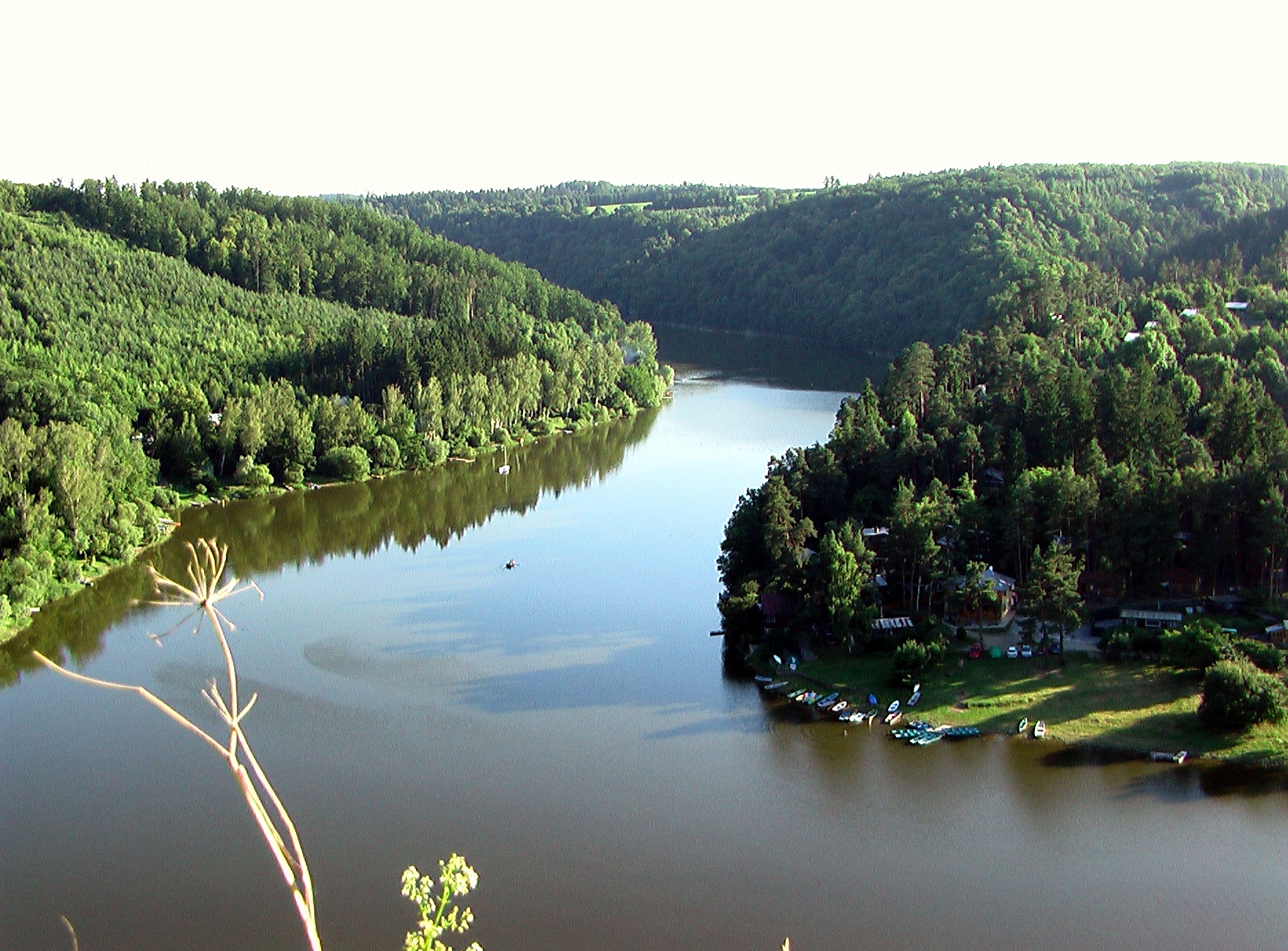
Looking out south of the upper chamber of the Tower House

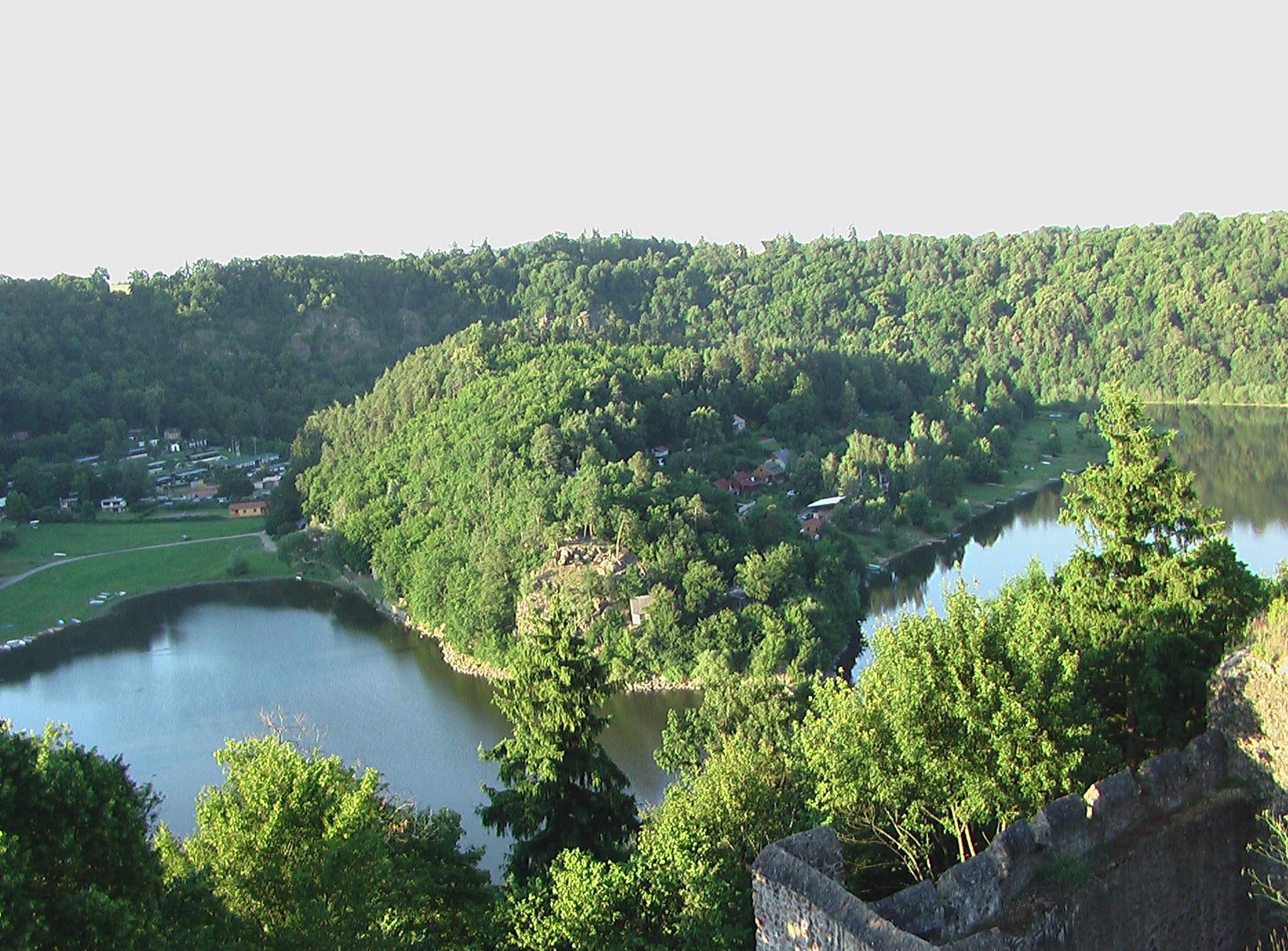
Looking out north of the New Palace

== See also ==
- March of Moravia
- Bítov Castle
