= Cornstein =

Cornstein may refer to:

- David B. Cornstein (1938–2026), American diplomat and businessman
- Cornštejn Castle, a castle near Bítov, Czech Republic
