= Racin =

Racin may refer to:

- Racing, a kind of competition
- Kočo Racin, pen name of Kosta Apostolov Solev (1908–1943), Macedonian writer and communist
- Racin Gardner (born 1972), American racing driver
- Račín, a municipality and village in the Czech Republic

== See also ==
- Racing (disambiguation)
