= Bítov Castle =

Czech castle

Coordinates: 48°56′37″N 15°42′02″E

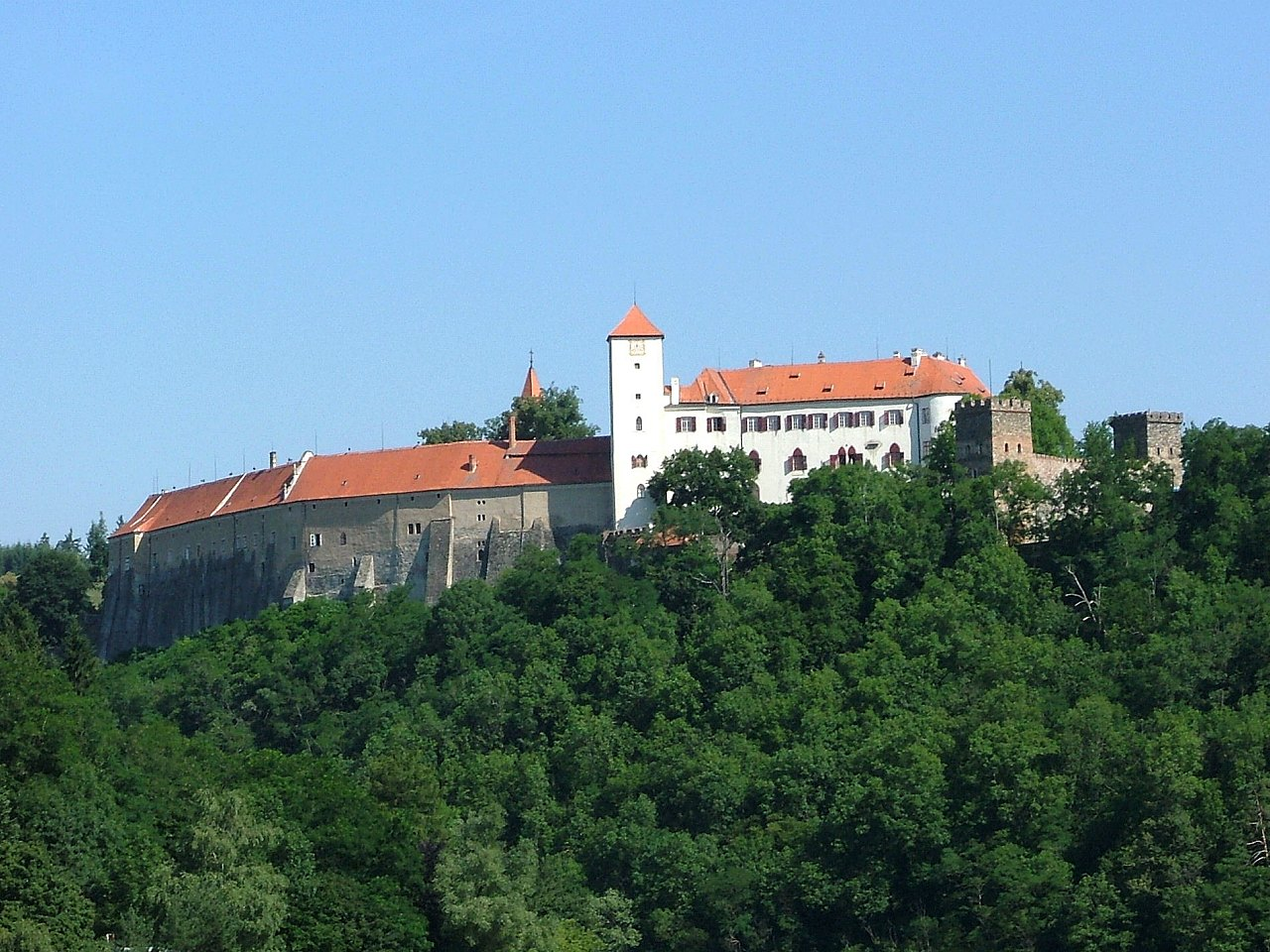
Bítov Castle

Bítov Castle (Czech: Hrad Bítov, German: Schloss Vöttau) is a castle on a steep promontory towering above the meandering River Želetavka, near the Vranov reservoir, in the village of Bítov, some 25 kilometres (16 mi) northwest of Znojmo, Czech Republic. Built in the 11th century, Bítov is one of the oldest and largest Moravian castles.

== History ==
A Přemyslid fortified settlement originally stood on the site and included the Chapel of Our Lady (Kostelík Panny Marie). The fort was rebuilt in the first half of the 13th century as an impregnable Gothic castle guarding the southern boundaries of the Přemyslid lands. In the 14th century a new inner ward was built along with Late Gothic fortifications. The Lords of Bítov became the new owners of the castle and based themselves here for four centuries. They carried out further improvements to the defensive capabilities of the castle.

Bítov finally underwent Baroque remodelling, and gained its present form at the beginning of the 19th century, when it passed into the hands of the Counts of Daun. The descendants of Marshal Daun, the famous military leader, rebuilt the castle in the spirit of the Romantic style. Between 1811 and 1845 the richly decorated state rooms were created, on the basis of proposals of Anton Schuler. The culmination of the re-Gothicising work was the remodelling of the Church of the Assumption of the Virgin (kostel Nanebevzetí Panny Marie) by Viennense architect Anton Rucker, who left the original Gothic furnishings. At the end of the 20th century, Bítov underwent extensive refurbishment.

The structural arrangement of the castle through remodelling, which was carried out several times later on, is an example of the Czech Early Gothic castle architecture. The arrangement is highly intricate and leads in one direction towards the front moat, to which both the wedge-shaped round towers are pointed. The outer tower, above the moat, was later merged with the body of the castle, while the other tower stands alone at the rear of the inner court.
