= Fryšava pod Žákovou horou =

- Municipality
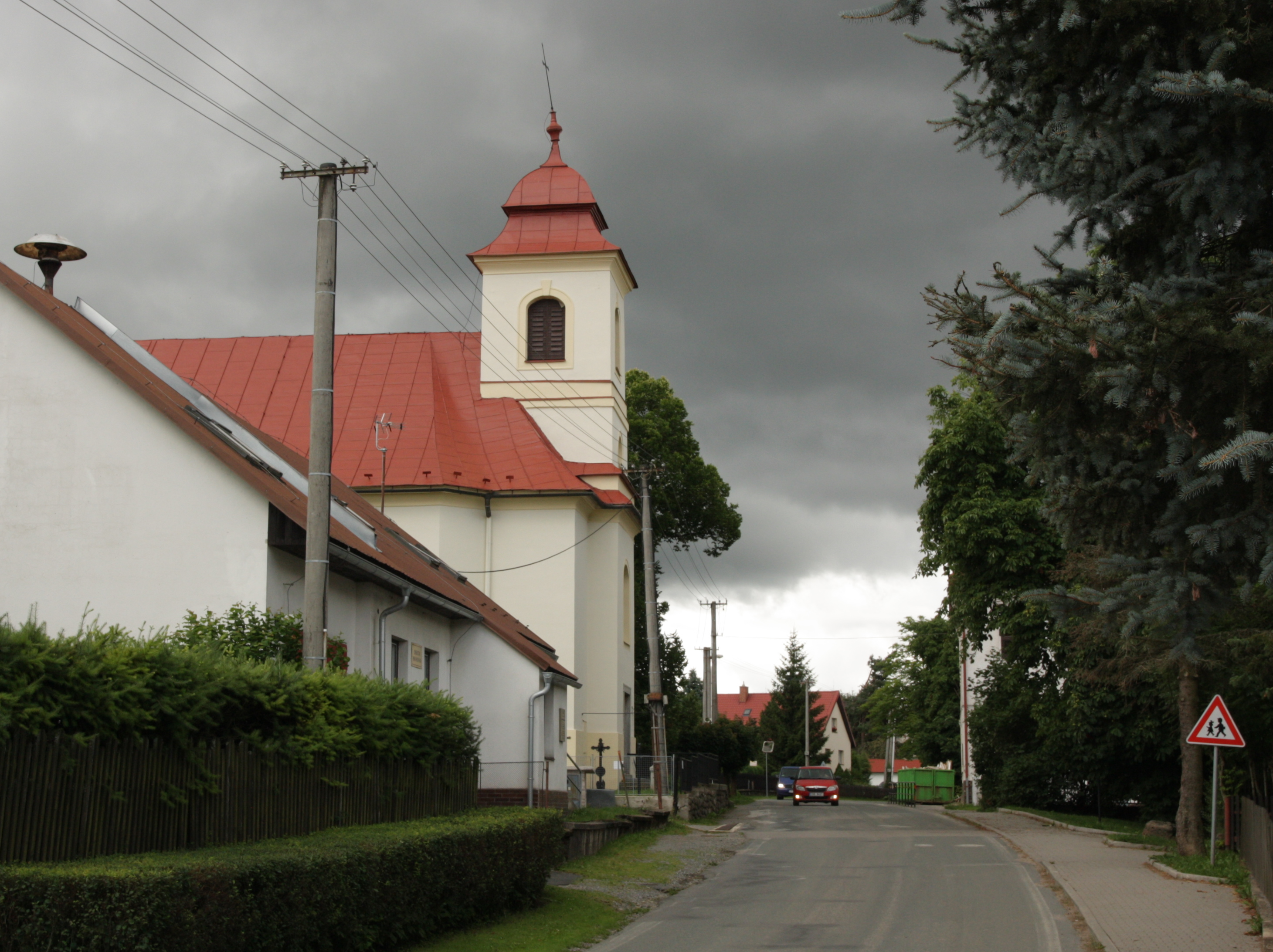
- Main street and the Church of Saint Matthew

- Flag Coat of arms

- Location in the Czech Republic
- Coordinates: 49°37′50″N 16°2′40″E
- Country: Czech Republic
- Region: Vysočina
- District: Žďár nad Sázavou
- First mentioned: 1560

Area
  - Total: 12.54 km^{2} (4.84 sq mi)
- Elevation: 708 m (2,323 ft)

Population (2026-01-01)
  - Total: 324
  - Density: 25.8/km^{2} (66.9/sq mi)
- Time zone: UTC+1 (CET)
  - Summer (DST): UTC+2 (CEST)
- Postal code: 592 04
- Website: frysava.cz

Fryšava pod Žákovou horou (German: Frischau) is a municipality and village in Žďár nad Sázavou District in the Vysočina Region of the Czech Republic. It has about 300 inhabitants.

Fryšava pod Žákovou horou lies approximately 11 kilometres (7 mi) north-east of Žďár nad Sázavou, 42 km (26 mi) north-east of Jihlava, and 127 km (79 mi) south-east of Prague.

== Demographics ==
Historical population
Year	Pop.	±%
1869	1,016	—
1880	1,048	+3.1%
1890	927	−11.5%
1900	895	−3.5%
1910	898	+0.3%
1921	776	−13.6%
1930	881	+13.5%
1950	544	−38.3%
1961	531	−2.4%
1970	481	−9.4%
1980	450	−6.4%
1991	379	−15.8%
2001	338	−10.8%
2011	344	+1.8%
2021	321	−6.7%
Source: Censuses
