= Poděšín =

- Municipality
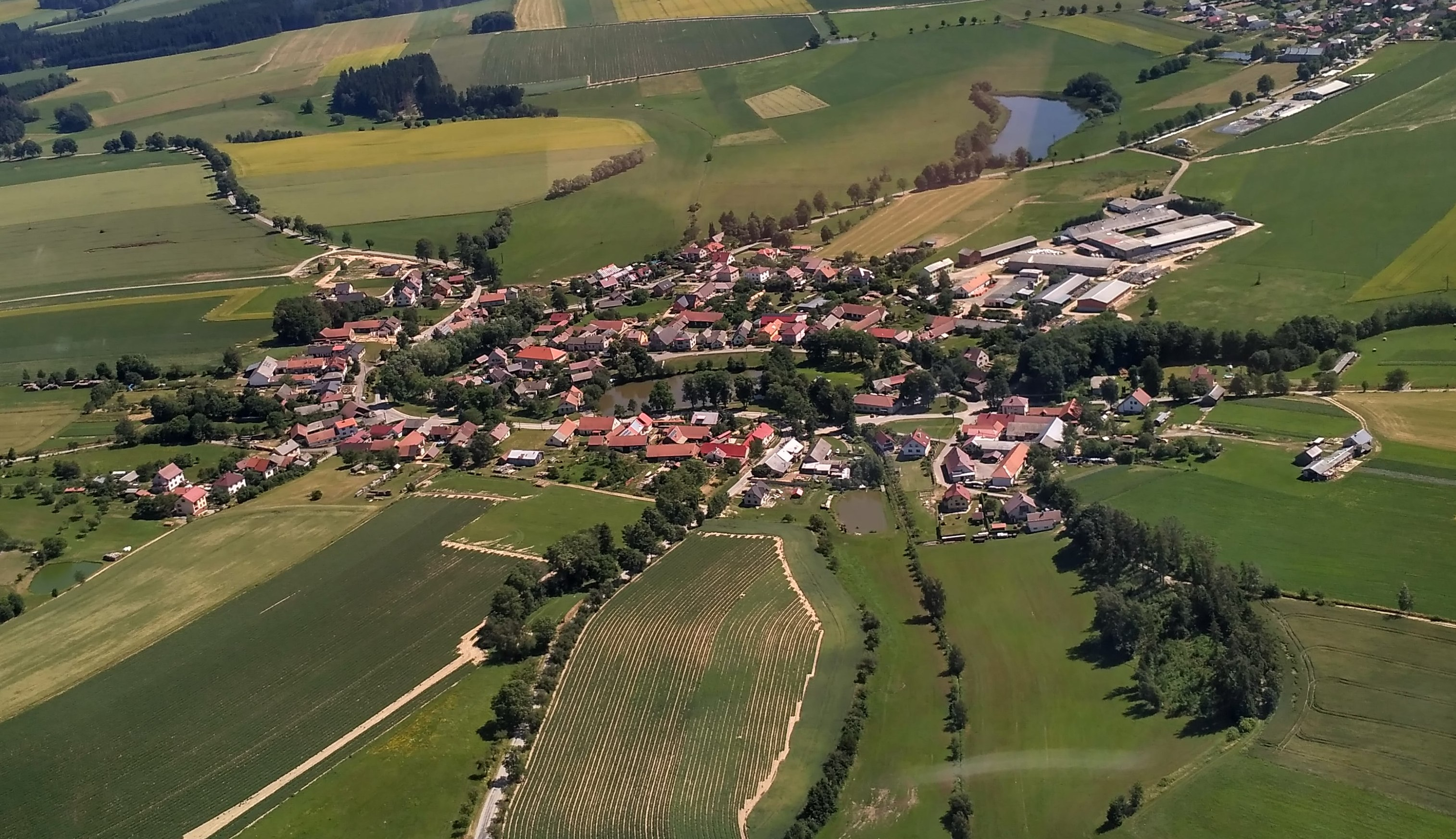
- Aerial view

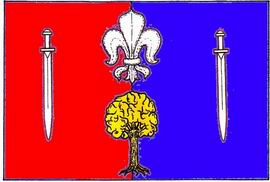
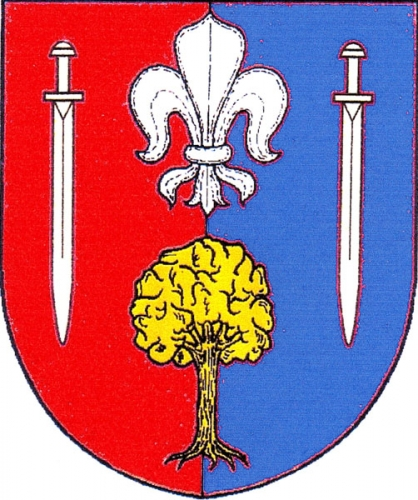
- Flag Coat of arms

- Location in the Czech Republic
- Coordinates: 49°30′28″N 15°48′3″E
- Country: Czech Republic
- Region: Vysočina
- District: Žďár nad Sázavou
- First mentioned: 1233

Area
  - Total: 6.89 km^{2} (2.66 sq mi)
- Elevation: 562 m (1,844 ft)

Population (2026-01-01)
  - Total: 260
  - Density: 38/km^{2} (98/sq mi)
- Time zone: UTC+1 (CET)
  - Summer (DST): UTC+2 (CEST)
- Postal code: 592 12
- Website: www.podesin.cz

Poděšín is a municipality and village in Žďár nad Sázavou District in the Vysočina Region of the Czech Republic. It has about 300 inhabitants.

Poděšín lies approximately 13 kilometres (8 mi) south-west of Žďár nad Sázavou, 20 km (12 mi) north-east of Jihlava, and 119 km (74 mi) south-east of Prague.

== Demographics ==
Historical population
Year	Pop.	±%
1869	363	—
1880	416	+14.6%
1890	397	−4.6%
1900	387	−2.5%
1910	375	−3.1%
1921	378	+0.8%
1930	370	−2.1%
1950	293	−20.8%
1961	296	+1.0%
1970	242	−18.2%
1980	208	−14.0%
1991	245	+17.8%
2001	250	+2.0%
2011	240	−4.0%
2021	253	+5.4%
Source: Censuses
