= Tři Studně =

- Municipality
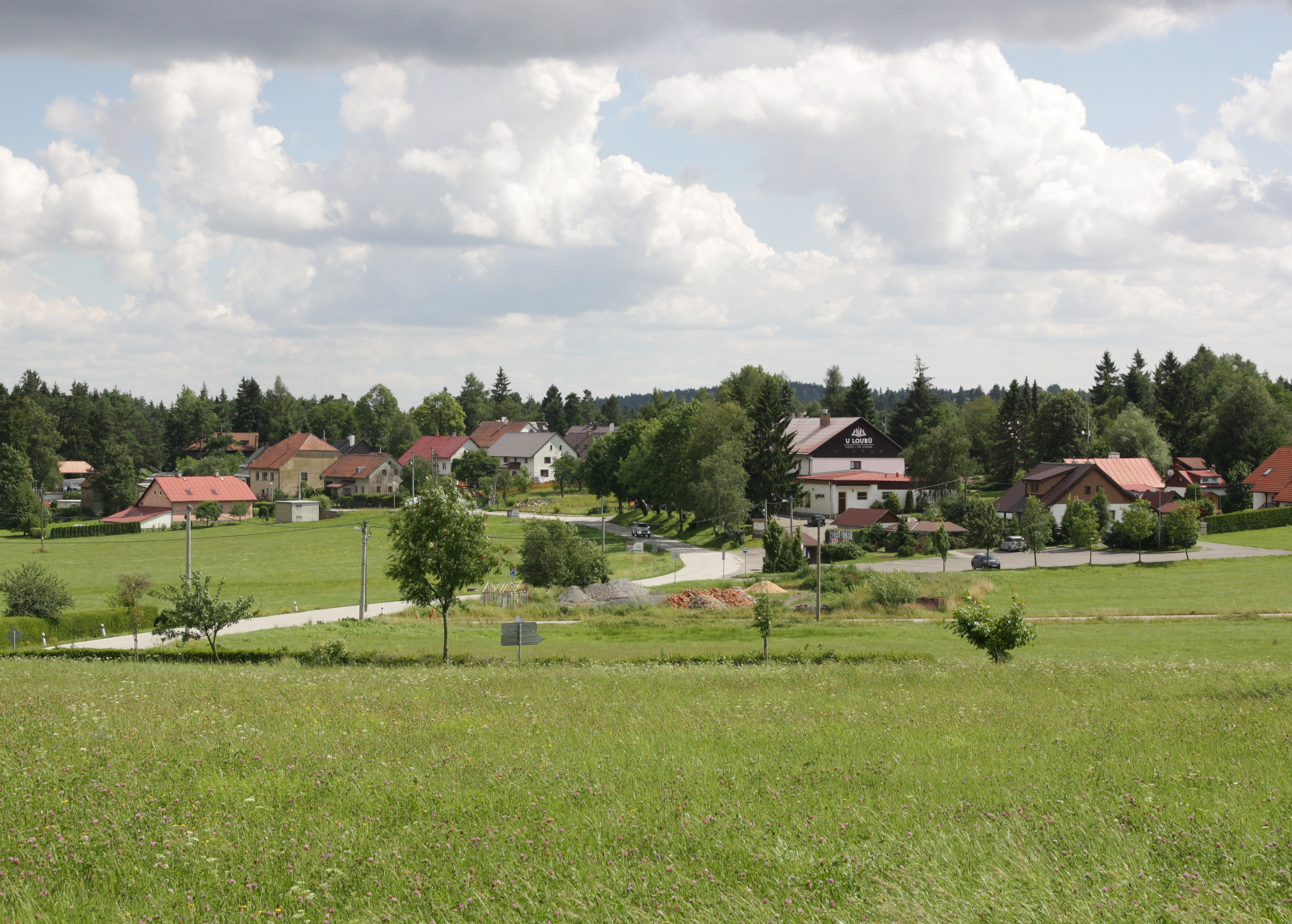
- View from the north

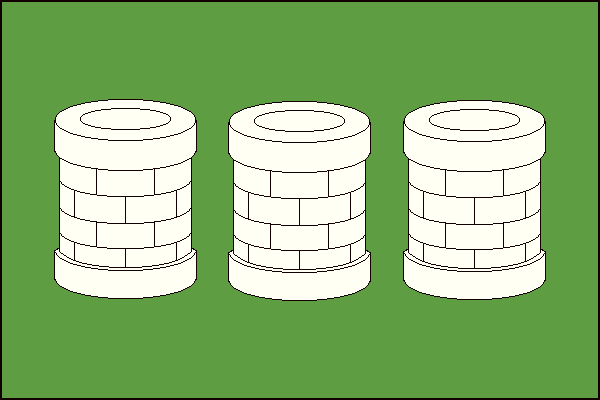
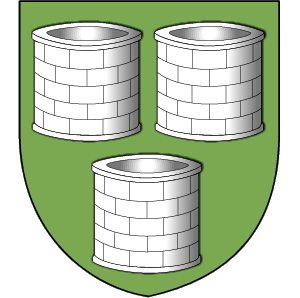
- Flag Coat of arms

- Location in the Czech Republic
- Coordinates: 49°36′46″N 16°2′12″E
- Country: Czech Republic
- Region: Vysočina
- District: Žďár nad Sázavou
- Founded: 1645

Area
  - Total: 4.43 km^{2} (1.71 sq mi)
- Elevation: 733 m (2,405 ft)

Population (2026-01-01)
  - Total: 106
  - Density: 23.9/km^{2} (62.0/sq mi)
- Time zone: UTC+1 (CET)
  - Summer (DST): UTC+2 (CEST)
- Postal code: 592 04
- Website: www.tristudne.cz

Tři Studně is a municipality and village in Žďár nad Sázavou District in the Vysočina Region of the Czech Republic. It has about 100 inhabitants.

Tři Studně lies approximately 9 kilometres (6 mi) north-east of Žďár nad Sázavou, 41 km (25 mi) north-east of Jihlava, and 127 km (79 mi) south-east of Prague.

== Demographics ==
Historical population
| Year | Pop. | ±% |
|---|---|---|
| 1869 | 257 | — |
| 1880 | 270 | +5.1% |
| 1890 | 263 | −2.6% |
| 1900 | 215 | −18.3% |
| 1910 | 178 | −17.2% |
| 1921 | 177 | −0.6% |
| 1930 | 157 | −11.3% |
| 1950 | 167 | +6.4% |
| 1961 | 124 | −25.7% |
| 1970 | 109 | −12.1% |
| 1980 | 109 | +0.0% |
| 1991 | 89 | −18.3% |
| 2001 | 90 | +1.1% |
| 2011 | 99 | +10.0% |
| 2021 | 109 | +10.1% |
Source: Censuses
