= Bítov (Znojmo District) =

- Municipality
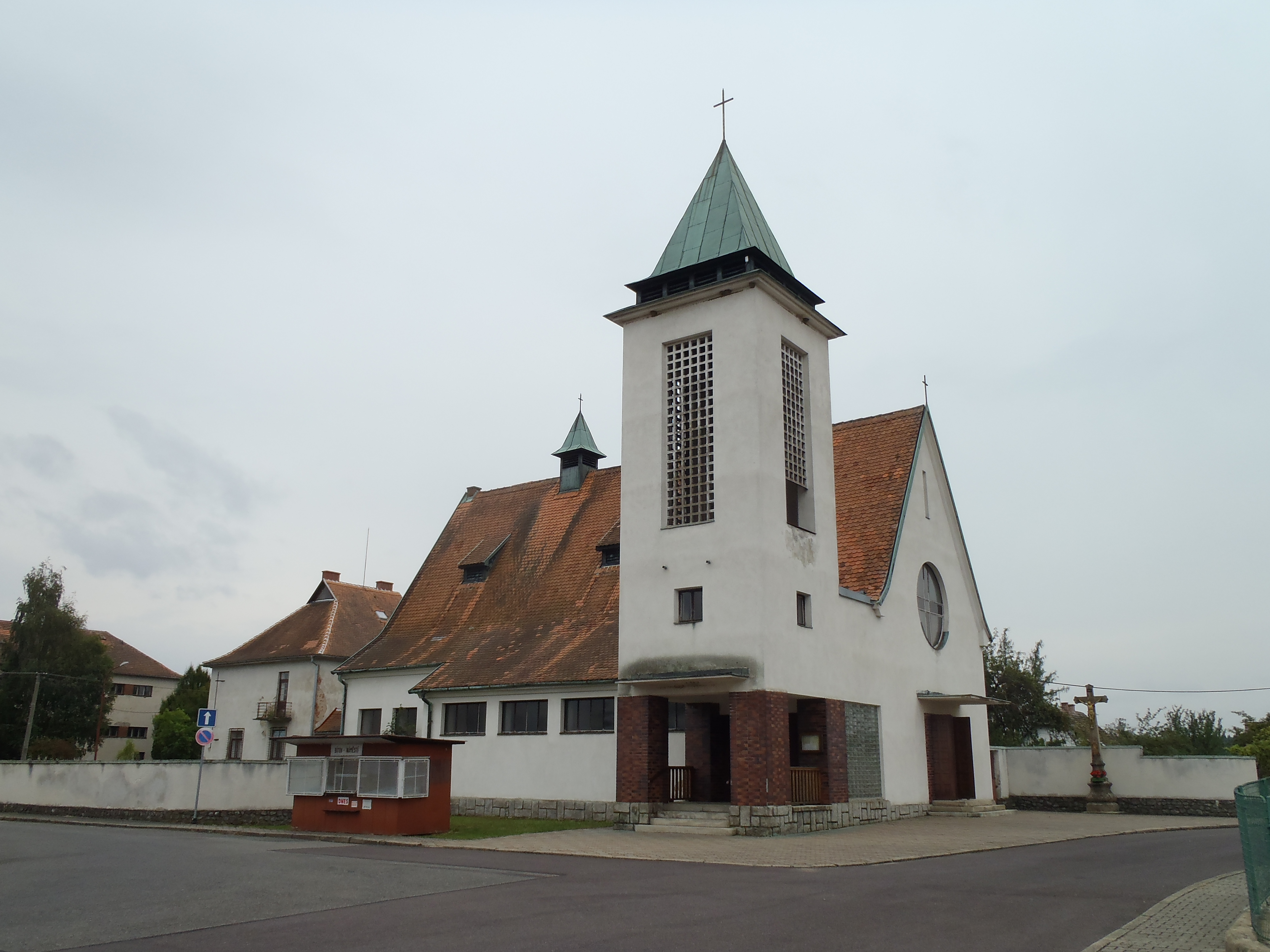
- Church of Saint Wenceslaus

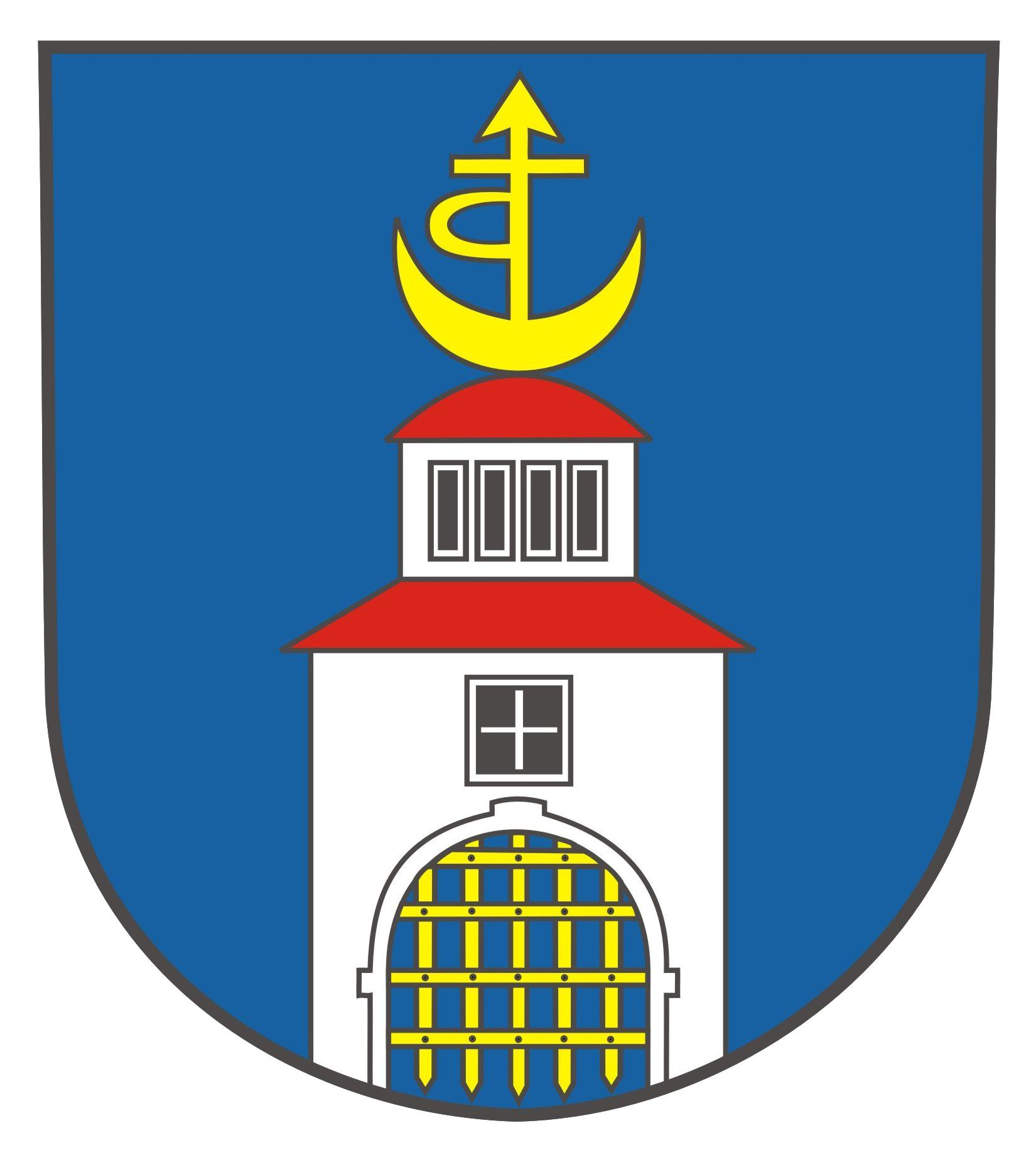
- Flag Coat of arms

- Location in the Czech Republic
- Coordinates: 48°56′11″N 15°43′44″E
- Country: Czech Republic
- Region: South Moravian
- District: Znojmo
- First mentioned: 1046

Area
  - Total: 6.08 km^{2} (2.35 sq mi)
- Elevation: 428 m (1,404 ft)

Population (2026-01-01)
  - Total: 141
  - Density: 23.2/km^{2} (60.1/sq mi)
- Time zone: UTC+1 (CET)
  - Summer (DST): UTC+2 (CEST)
- Postal code: 671 10
- Website: www.obec-bitov.cz

Bítov (German: Vöttau) is a municipality and village in Znojmo District in the South Moravian Region of the Czech Republic. It has about 100 inhabitants.

== Geography ==
Bítov is located about 24 kilometres (15 mi) northwest of Znojmo and 69 km (43 mi) southwest of Brno. It lies in the Jevišovice Uplands. The highest point is at 479 m (1,572 ft) above sea level. It is situated at the confluence of the Thaya and Želetavka rivers. The Vranov Reservoir is built here on the Thaya River.

== History ==
The first written mention of Bítov is in the foundation deed of the Stará Boleslav Chapter from 1046. History of the village is connected with the Bítov Castle, which was first mentioned in a deed from the 1060s. From 1307 to 1572, Bítov was a property of the Lichtenburk family. Among the next owners of Bítov were the noble families of Strein, Jankovský, Daun, Haugwitz, Radziwiłł and Haas.

== Demographics ==
Historical population

Year	Pop.	±%
1869	346	—
1880	375	+8.4%
1890	384	+2.4%
1900	407	+6.0%
1910	420	+3.2%

Year	Pop.	±%
1921	416	−1.0%
1930	402	−3.4%
1950	217	−46.0%
1961	244	+12.4%
1970	224	−8.2%

Year	Pop.	±%
1980	194	−13.4%
1991	171	−11.9%
2001	154	−9.9%
2011	150	−2.6%
2021	138	−8.0%

Source: Censuses

== Transport ==
There are no railways or major roads passing through the municipality.

== Sights ==
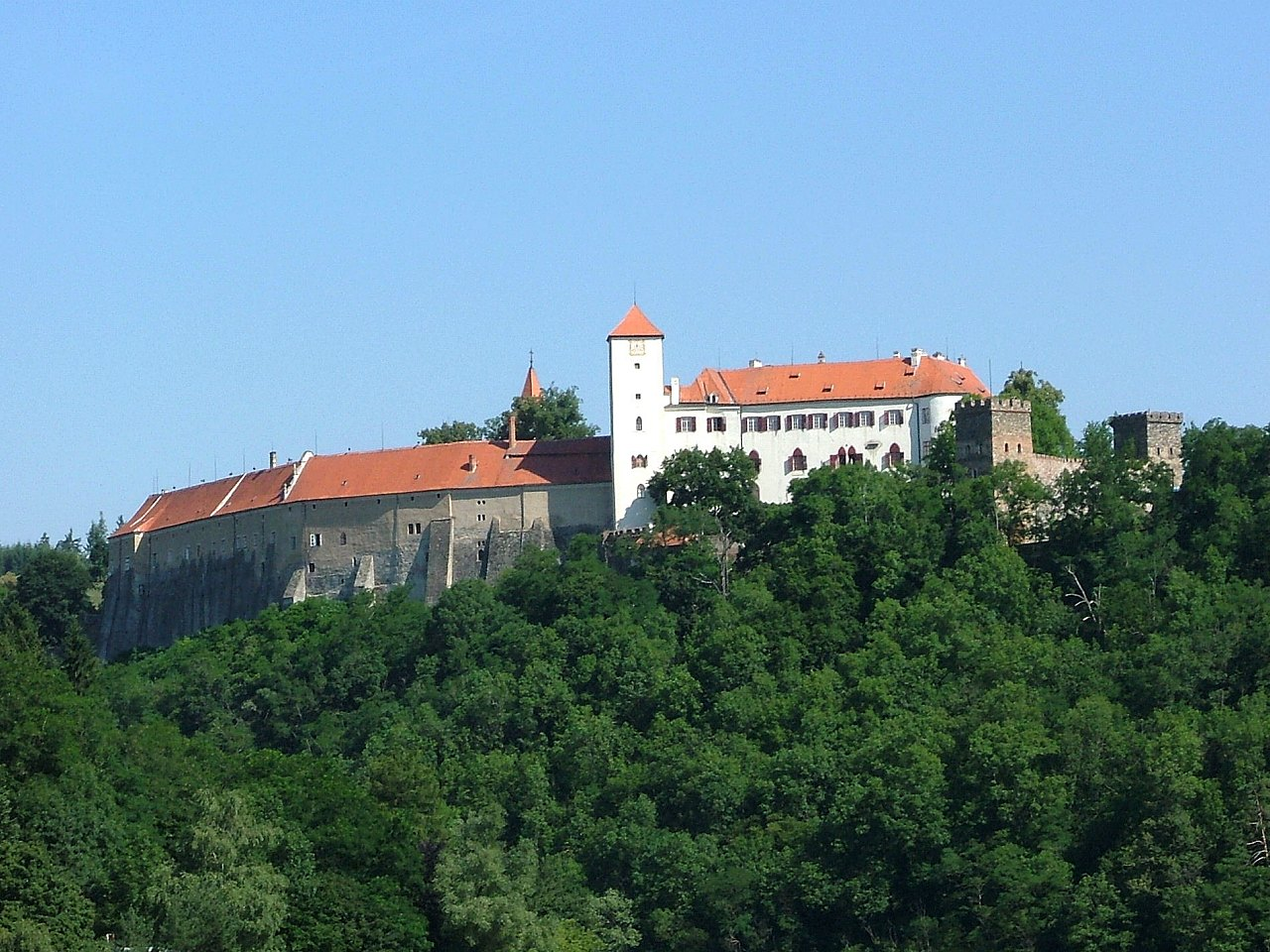
Bítov Castle

Bítov is known for the Bítov Castle, one of the oldest castles in the country. It was probably founded by Bretislav I before 1055. Today it is owned by the state and offers guided tours. For its value, it is protected as a national cultural monument.

The Cornštejn Castle is located on the opposite bank of the Thaya River than the village and castle of Bítov. It is a ruin of a large Gothic castle, built at the end of the 13th century. After the Lichtenburk family died out in 1572, the castle was abandoned and fell into disrepair.

The main landmark of the village centre is the Church of Saint Wenceslaus. It was built in 1934–1935 and is an important example of pre-World War II sacral architecture.
