= Račín =

- Municipality
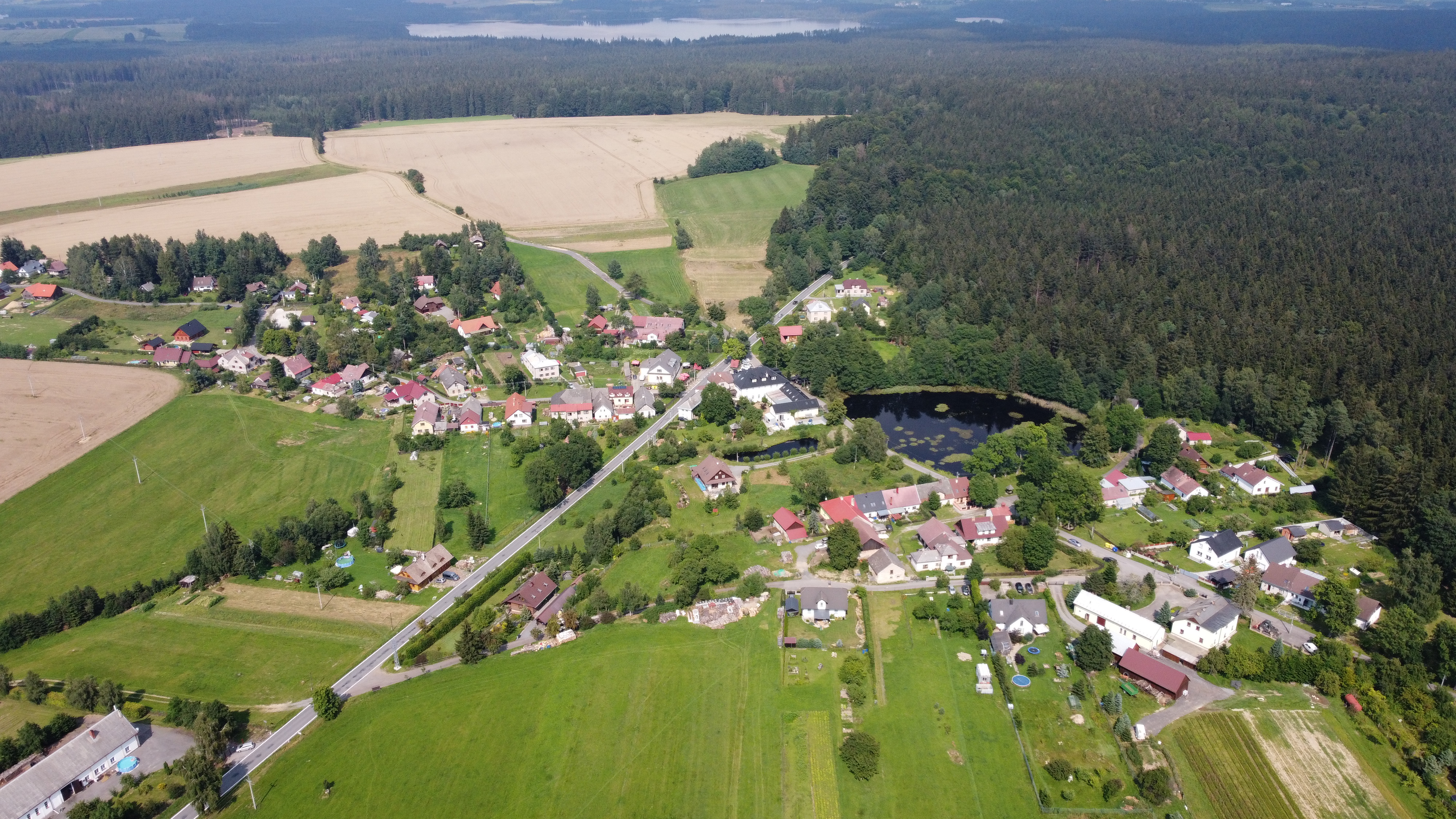
- Aerial view from the southwest

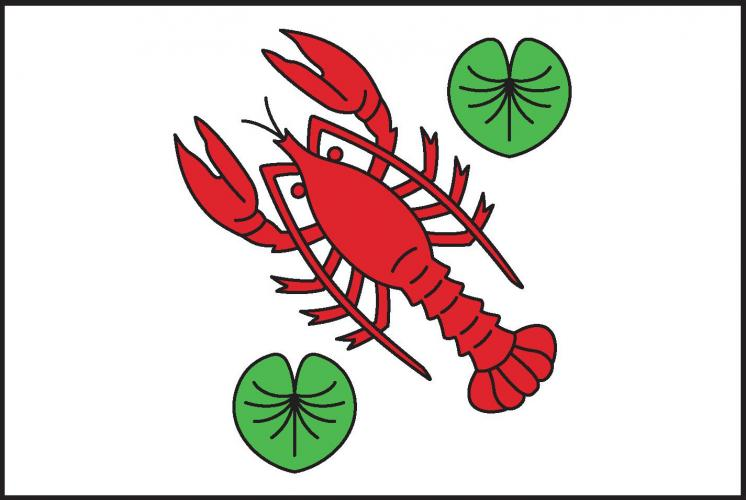
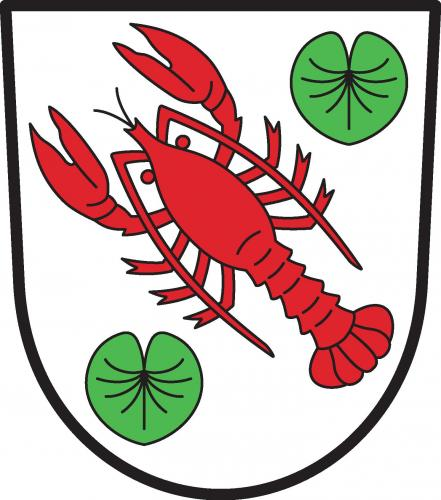
- Flag Coat of arms

- Location in the Czech Republic
- Coordinates: 49°37′3″N 15°52′0″E
- Country: Czech Republic
- Region: Vysočina
- District: Žďár nad Sázavou
- First mentioned: 1654

Area
  - Total: 7.96 km^{2} (3.07 sq mi)
- Elevation: 648 m (2,126 ft)

Population (2026-01-01)
  - Total: 146
  - Density: 18.3/km^{2} (47.5/sq mi)
- Time zone: UTC+1 (CET)
  - Summer (DST): UTC+2 (CEST)
- Postal code: 592 11
- Website: obecracin.cz

Račín is a municipality and village in Žďár nad Sázavou District in the Vysočina Region of the Czech Republic. It has about 100 inhabitants.

Račín lies approximately 8 kilometres (5 mi) north-west of Žďár nad Sázavou, 31 km (19 mi) north-east of Jihlava, and 117 km (73 mi) south-east of Prague.

== Demographics ==
Historical population
Year	Pop.	±%
1869	194	—
1880	166	−14.4%
1890	165	−0.6%
1900	156	−5.5%
1910	175	+12.2%
1921	150	−14.3%
1930	137	−8.7%
1950	116	−15.3%
1961	138	+19.0%
1970	128	−7.2%
1980	114	−10.9%
1991	91	−20.2%
2001	87	−4.4%
2011	118	+35.6%
2021	129	+9.3%
Source: Censuses
