= Mukařov =

Mukařov may refer to places in the Czech Republic:

- Mukařov (Mladá Boleslav District), a municipality and village in the Central Bohemian Region
- Mukařov (Prague-East District), a municipality and village in the Central Bohemian Region
- Mukařov, a village and part of Lovečkovice in the Ústí nad Labem Region
- Mukařov, a village and part of Malá Skála in the Liberec Region
