= Josef Beran =

Czech cardinal, professor and theologist

His Eminence Josef Beran Servant of God
- Cardinal; Archbishop of Prague
- Church: Roman Catholic Church
- Archdiocese: Prague
- See: Prague
- Appointed: 4 November 1946
- Term ended: 17 May 1969
- Predecessor: Karel Kašpar
- Successor: František Tomášek
- Other post: Cardinal-Priest of Santa Croce in Via Flaminia (1965-69)

Orders
- Ordination: 10 June 1911 by Pietro Respighi
- Consecration: 8 December 1946 by Saverio Ritter
- Created cardinal: 22 February 1965 by Pope Paul VI
- Rank: Cardinal-Priest

Personal details
- Born: Josef Beran; 29 December 1888 Plzeň, Plzeňský kraj, Bohemia, Kingdom of Bohemia, Austria-Hungary
- Died: 17 May 1969 (aged 80) Pontifical Nepomucene College, Rome, Italy
- Buried: Saint Peter's Basilica, Vatican City (until 2018); Saint Vitus Cathedral (from 2018)
- Education: Pontifical Urbaniana University
- Motto: Eucharistia et labor ("Eucharist and labor")
- Coat of arms: Josef Beran's coat of arms

Sainthood
- Attributes: Cardinal's attire

Styles of Josef Beran
- Reference style: His Eminence
- Spoken style: Your Eminence
- Religious style: Cardinal
- Posthumous style: Servant of God
- Informal style: Cardinal
- See: Prague

Ordination history of Josef Beran
History
Priestly ordination
- Ordained by: Pietro Respighi
- Date: 10 June 1911
- Place: Basilica of Saint John Lateran, Rome, Kingdom of Italy
Episcopal consecration
- Principal consecrator: Saverio Ritter
- Co-consecrators: Moric Picha; Antonin Eltschkner
- Date: 8 December 1946
- Place: Saint Vitus Cathedral, Prague, Czechoslovakia
Cardinalate
- Elevated by: Pope Paul VI
- Date: 22 February 1965
Episcopal succession
Bishops consecrated by Josef Beran as principal consecrator
- Joseph Matocha: 2 May 1948

Josef Beran (29 December 1888 – 17 May 1969) was a Czech Catholic prelate who served as Archbishop of Prague from 1946 until his death. He was elevated to the cardinalate in 1965.

Adam Beran was imprisoned in the Dachau concentration camp during World War II after the Nazis had targeted him for "subversive and dangerous" behavior where he almost died in 1943 due to disease. He was freed in 1945 upon Allied liberation and Pope Pius XII nominated him to head the Prague archdiocese. But the introduction of the communist regime saw him imprisoned and placed under house arrest. His release in 1963 came with the condition that he could not perform his episcopal duties and he was later exiled to Rome in 1965 as part of a coordinated deal between the church and the national government.

His cause for canonization opened in 1998 and he became titled as a Servant of God. He was granted the rare honor of being buried in Saint Peter's Basilica upon his death and remained the sole Czech national to be buried there until 2018 when his remains were transferred back to his native homeland for interment in the Saint Vitus Cathedral.

== Life ==
=== Education and priesthood ===
Josef Beran was born in Plzeň on 29 December 1888 as the eldest of four children to the schoolteacher Josef Beran and Marie Lindauerová (b. 16 May 1866; the niece of famous painter Gottfried Lindauer). Father Josef Jaroslav baptized Beran whose godparents were Josef Beneš and Rozálie Benešová. Beran's siblings (in order) were his brothers Jaroslav, Karel and Slavoj and his sister Marie. His father's earnings were meager. Beran thought about learning medicine but a religious instructor at his school thought that he would make a fine priest and so used his influence to secure him a position for ecclesial studies.

Beran commenced his ecclesial studies in Plzeň from 1899 to 1907 (graduating with distinction in June 1907) and later at the Pontifical Urbaniana in Rome from 1907 until 1911. He was ordained to the priesthood in the Basilica of Saint John Lateran on 10 June 1911 in Rome. In 1912 he obtained a doctorate. Beran began doing pastoral work in Plzeň until 1932. From 1912 until 1917 he did work in a worker's district parish and was later named as both a chaplain for the Sisters of Notre Dame in Prague and then as the director for the Saint Anne Institute from 1917 until 1929. Beran was made the spiritual director for seminarians in Prague from 1932 until 1942 and also served as a professor at Charles College in 1932. Pope Pius XI later named him as a monsignor on 11 June 1936.

Beran ensured that Pius XI's document Mit brennender Sorge was published and circulated in Prague due to the anti-racism stance the document made. Beran was made a full professor in 1939 ending his stint as an assistant professor. Pope Pius XII reconfirmed him as a monsignor on 19 October 1939. On 21 April 1941 the cardinal Karel Kašpar died and the Nazis seized the moment insisting Beran broadcast on radio the announcement of the cardinal's death. The Nazis made him do this and placed Beran near the top of the list of "religious radicals".

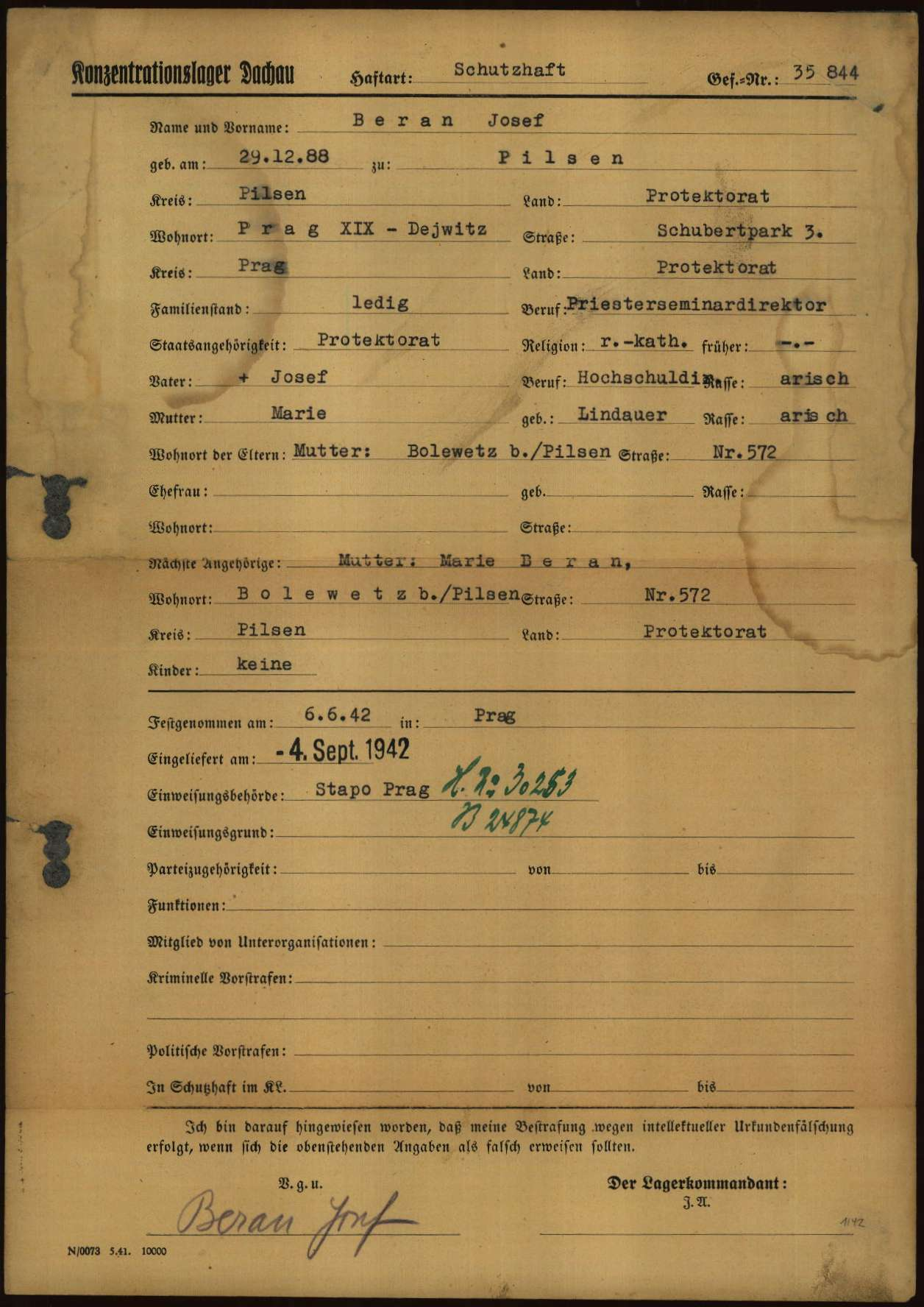
Registration form of Josef Beran as a prisoner at Dachau Nazi Concentration Camp

At the beginning of June 1942 he announced he would celebrate a Mass for the Czechoslovak prisoners of war detained and in Czech in direct defiance of Nazi directives. The Gestapo arrested Beran on 6 June 1942 during World War II (on the basis of being "subversive and dangerous") and he was later imprisoned without trial in Pankrác at Theresienstadt (alongside future cardinal Štěpán Trochta) and also the Dachau concentration camp. From 6 June 1942 until 6 July he was held in Pankrác before being sent for two months to Terzin. He arrived at Dachau on 4 September 1942 where his number was 25844. It was there that a typhoid epidemic in 1943 almost killed him but he rallied from it and remained there until 29 April 1945 after Allied forces liberated the camp. Upon his immediate return to Prague the President of Czechoslovakia Edvard Beneš decorated him with the Iron Cross and the medal of Hero of the Resistance - the two highest honors the nation had.

=== Episcopate ===
On 4 November 1946 he was appointed as the Archbishop of Prague and thus the leader of the Czechoslovak Church; this also made him the Primate. Beran received his episcopal consecration on the following 8 December from Archbishop Saverio Ritter with Bishops Mořic (Maurice) Pícha and Anton Eltschkner serving as the co-consecrators.

The election of Klement Gottwald - the communist president of Czechoslovakia in 1948 - prompted Beran to have a Te Deum sung for the new president in the Prague Cathedral. However the rise of the communist regime in 1948 saw Beran prohibit his priests from taking an oath of allegiance to the new regime (viewing such an action as a "treason to the Christian faith") and in public protested the seizure of land that belonged to the Prague archdiocese. as well as the infringement of religious freedom. He declared: "The Catholic Church should enjoy the absolute freedom to which it has a right, both God-given and guaranteed by the existing Constitution". He condemned as schismatic the Communist government-approved Czech Catholic Action. On 19 June 1949 he was placed under house arrest and complained of being "deprived of all personal freedom and all rights as the archbishop".

He was convicted in a show trial and his house arrest - confining him to the archiepiscopal residence - ended on 7 March 1951. On 10 March he was taken from Prague with few knowing his precise location. In that period he was first taken to a villa near Liberec before being sent to Mištěves and Hořice. He was then sent to Paběnice and Mukařov near Prague. On 4 October 1963 before going to Radvanov. His release came in 1963 and he was forbidden to perform his ecclesial duties; this lasted until his relocation to Rome in 1965. During his time in imprisonment he resisted regime pressure to resign from his see. In May 1961 the pope sent him a letter to commemorate the 50th anniversary of his ordination. But the letter was sent back to the pope with the words "without delivery". To that end John XXIII published the letter in L'Osservatore Romano. It was a widespread rumour that Beran was one of the three prelates that Pope John XXIII elevated into the College of Cardinals reserved in pectore on 28 March 1960; the pope's death in 1963 meant that it was never known if that was indeed true since the pope did not reveal the names of those reserved.

=== Cardinalate and exile ===
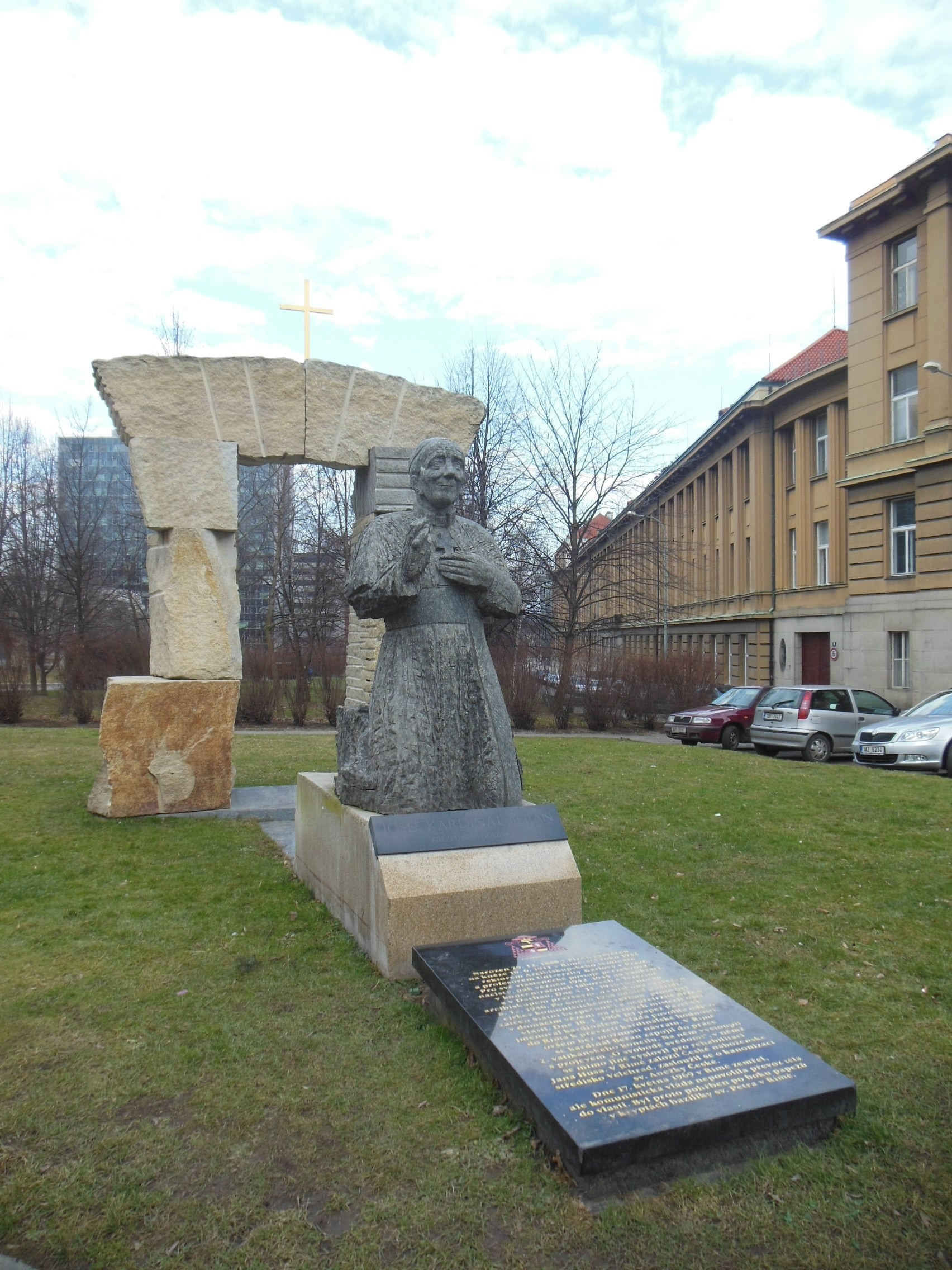
Monument.

Beran was impeded from exercising his episcopal duties upon his release and offered his resignation to the pope on numerous occasions despite such resignations being refused each time. Beran later went to live in Rome on 17 February 1965 in exchange for governmental concessions to the Church following negotiations in late 1964 that saw the appointment of new bishops and an apostolic administrator for the Prague archdiocese due to Beran's negotiated exit. He knew going to Rome was an exile and tried to resist at first. But Beran relented for the good of the Czech Church and the progress that had been made.

Pope Paul VI elevated him into the cardinalate and made him the Cardinal-Priest of Santa Croce in Via Flaminia on 22 February 1965; he received his red hat and title on 25 February. He was made a member of both the Congregation for the Clergy and the Congregation for Rites. In 1965 he participated in the last session of the Second Vatican Council. During the council's discussion on its document Dignitatis humanae on 20 September 1965 he suggested that expiation for past attacks on religious freedom was a possible cause of the Church's modern suffering. He spoke on the principle of ecclesial independence and received a standing ovation. In 1966 he made a trip to the United States of America where he received several honorary academic citations. In 1968 the pope sent him a letter in Latin to commemorate his 80th birthday. In 1969 he gave an address on Vatican Radio in response to the suicide of Jan Palach. Beran disapproved of his suicide but highlighted Palach's ideals. His address drew some criticism.

=== Death ===
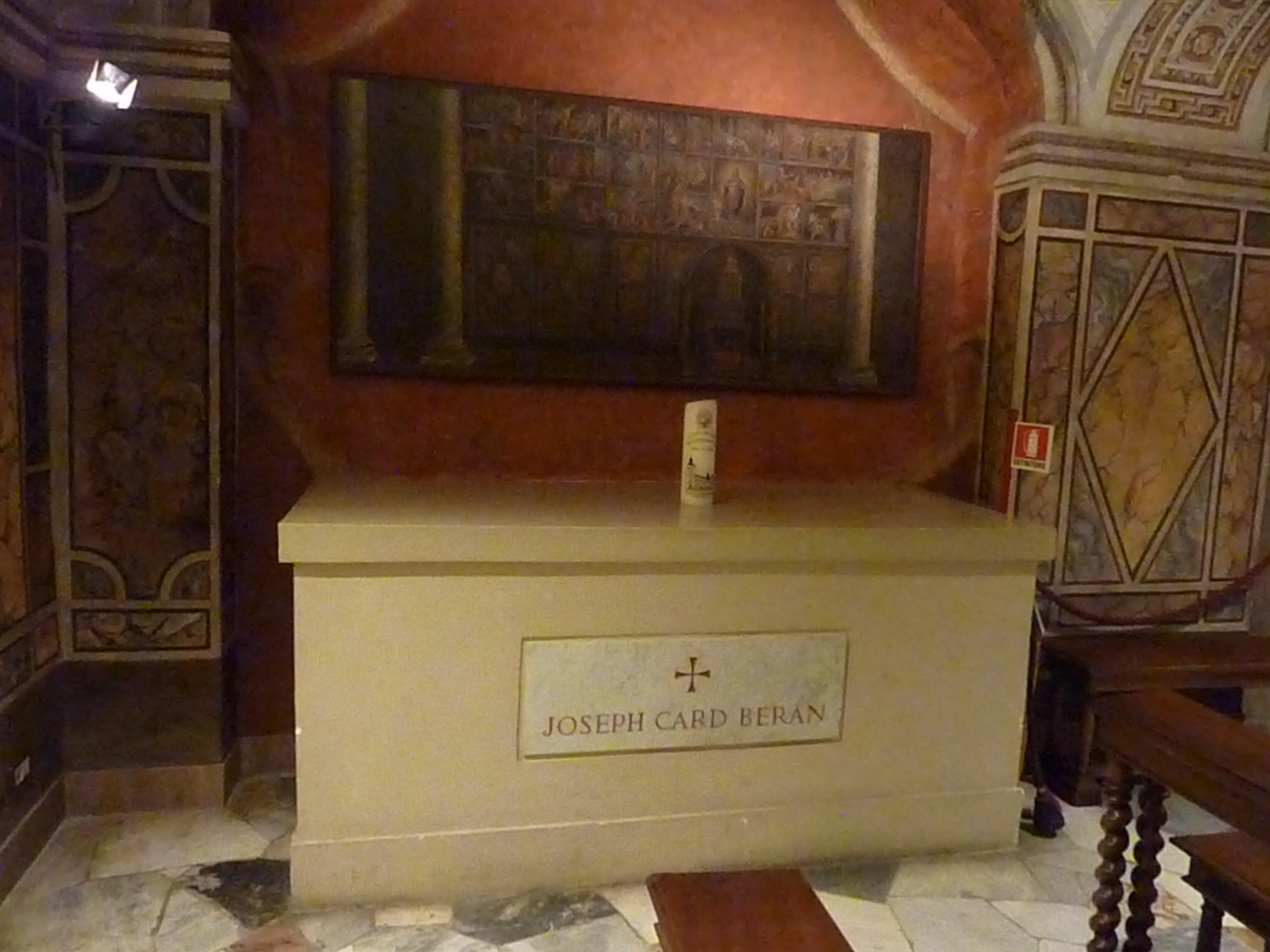
Beran's original tomb in Saint Peter's Basilica until 2018.

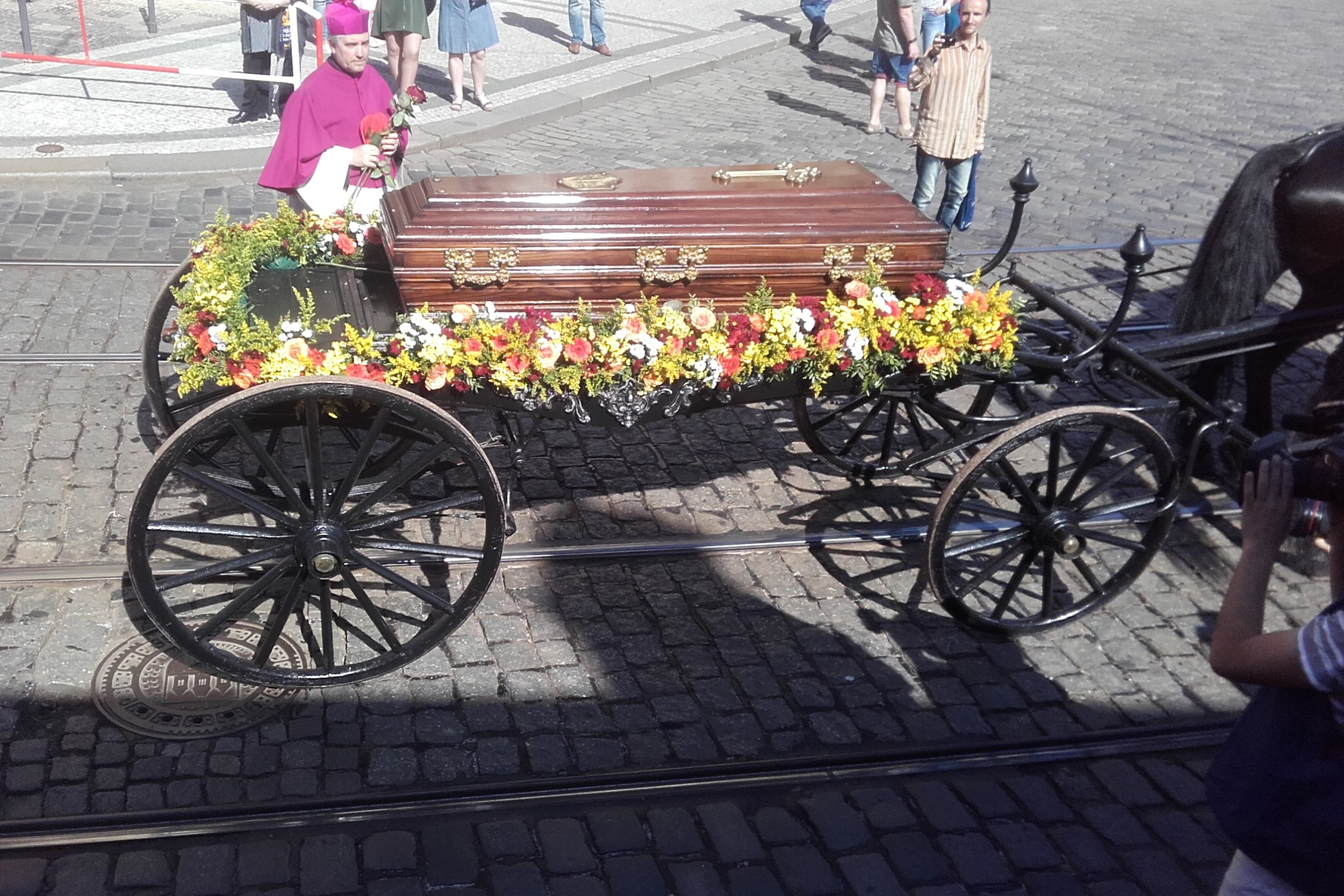
Beran's remains transported to Prague in 2018.

Beran died from lung cancer in Rome in 1969 at the Pontifical Nepomucene College where he lived. Pope Paul VI learned of the cardinal's precarious health condition and he rushed to visit the ailing cardinal but was too late. Beran had died just a few minutes before Paul VI arrived at his bedside. He was buried in the grotto of Saint Peter's Basilica in the chapel of the Bruised Madonna after Paul VI celebrated his funeral. Upon his death Cardinal Franjo Šeper referred to Beran as "the second Saint Adalbert".

==== Burial and re-interment ====
Beran's last will expressed his desire to be buried in Prague but this never materialized after his death because the Czechoslovak communist government forbade his remains to be brought in. This changed in 2018 after Pope Francis permitted the transfer of the late cardinal's remains to Prague which occurred on 20 April with Cardinal Angelo Comastri overseeing it. A permanent plaque was put in place of his old tomb to commemorate Beran and the small bag of earth buried with him was also sent back to his homeland. His coffin was then transported to the Pontifical Neopomucenum where he lived in Rome for a short gathering with the Czech Culture Minister leading the Czech delegation. His remains were then buried on 23 April in the Saint Vitus Cathedral in the Saint Agnes of Bohemia chapel. The translation of his remains came after the cardinal's relatives and Cardinal Dominik Duka requested it of the pope.

==== Monument ====
Cardinal Miloslav Vlk blessed the foundation stone of a memorial to Beran unveiled on 13 May 2009 in Prague. The cardinal underlined that "truth" and fairness" were integral aspects to Beran's life. Present at the unveiling were Archbishop Karel Otcanasek and the archdiocesan vicar-general Fr. Michael Slavik.

== Beatification process ==
The beatification process for Beran was introduced on 9 February 1998 after the Congregation for the Causes of Saints titled the late cardinal as a Servant of God and issued the official "nihil obstat" edict opening the cause; this came after the forum for the cause was moved on 14 February 1997 from Rome to Prague. On 2 April 1998 the beatification process was launched in Prague in a diocesan process tasked with the collection of both documentation and witness testimonies in relation to his life and reputation for holiness. Cardinal Miloslav Vlk presided over the launch of the process with the apostolic nuncio Giovanni Coppa present. The diocesan process was later closed on 17 May 2018.

Catholic Church titles
Preceded by Karel Kašpar	Archbishop of Prague; 4 November 1946–17 May 1969	Succeeded by František Tomášek
