= Svojetice =

- Municipality
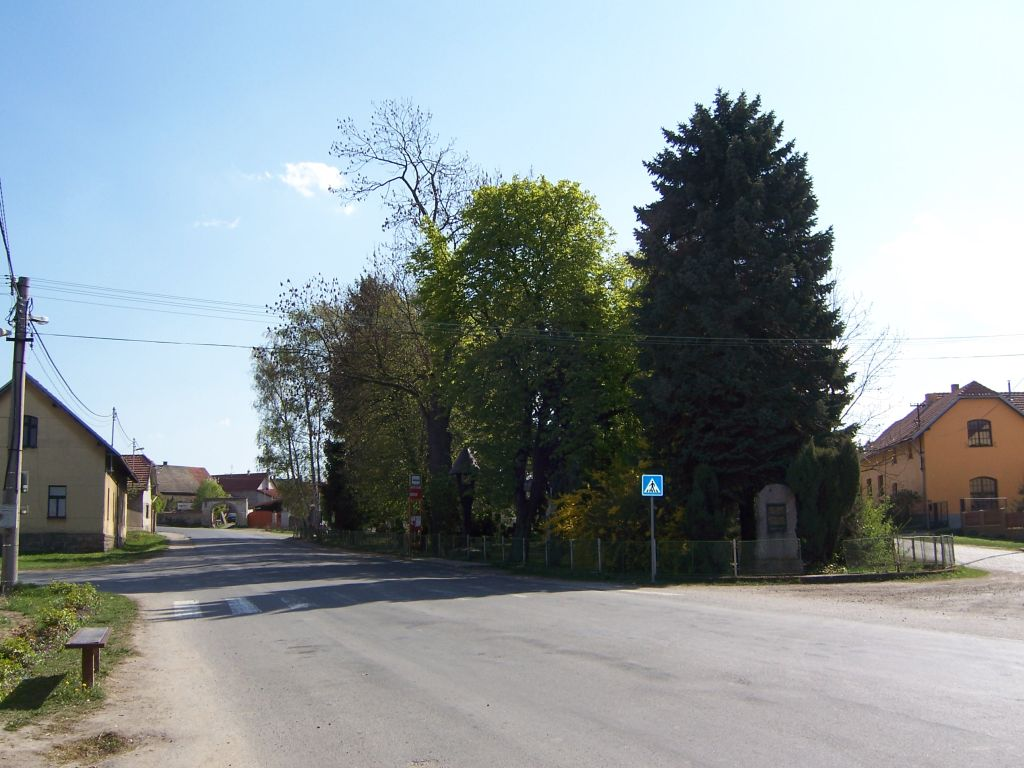
- Common in Svojetice

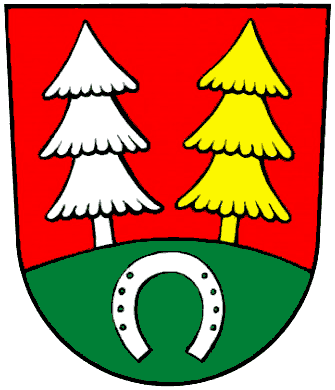
- Flag Coat of arms

- Location in the Czech Republic
- Coordinates: 49°58′17″N 14°44′19″E
- Country: Czech Republic
- Region: Central Bohemian
- District: Prague-East
- First mentioned: 1407

Area
  - Total: 2.58 km^{2} (1.00 sq mi)
- Elevation: 472 m (1,549 ft)

Population (2026-01-01)
  - Total: 1,410
  - Density: 547/km^{2} (1,420/sq mi)
- Time zone: UTC+1 (CET)
  - Summer (DST): UTC+2 (CEST)
- Postal code: 251 62
- Website: svojetice.cz

Svojetice is a municipality and village in Prague-East District in the Central Bohemian Region of the Czech Republic. It has about 1,400 inhabitants.

== Etymology ==
The name is derived from the personal name Svojata, meaning "the village of Svojata's people".

== Geography ==
Svojetice is located about 17 kilometres (11 mi) east of Prague. It lies in the Benešov Uplands. The highest point is at 500 m (1,640 ft) above sea level.

== History ==
The first written mention of Svojetice is from 1407, when it was a part of the Tehov estate. In 1513, the Tehov estate with Svojetice was annexed to the Černý Kostelec estate. Svojetice belonged to this estate until the establishment of an independent municipality in 1848.

== Demographics ==
Historical population

Year	Pop.	±%
1869	410	—
1880	426	+3.9%
1890	427	+0.2%
1900	408	−4.4%
1910	397	−2.7%

Year	Pop.	±%
1921	399	+0.5%
1930	411	+3.0%
1950	345	−16.1%
1961	372	+7.8%
1970	328	−11.8%

Year	Pop.	±%
1980	341	+4.0%
1991	333	−2.3%
2001	404	+21.3%
2011	817	+102.2%
2021	1,300	+59.1%

Source: Censuses

== Transport ==
There are no railways or major roads passing through the municipality.

== Sights ==
There are no protected cultural monuments in the municipality.
