= Mirošov (Rokycany District) =

- Town
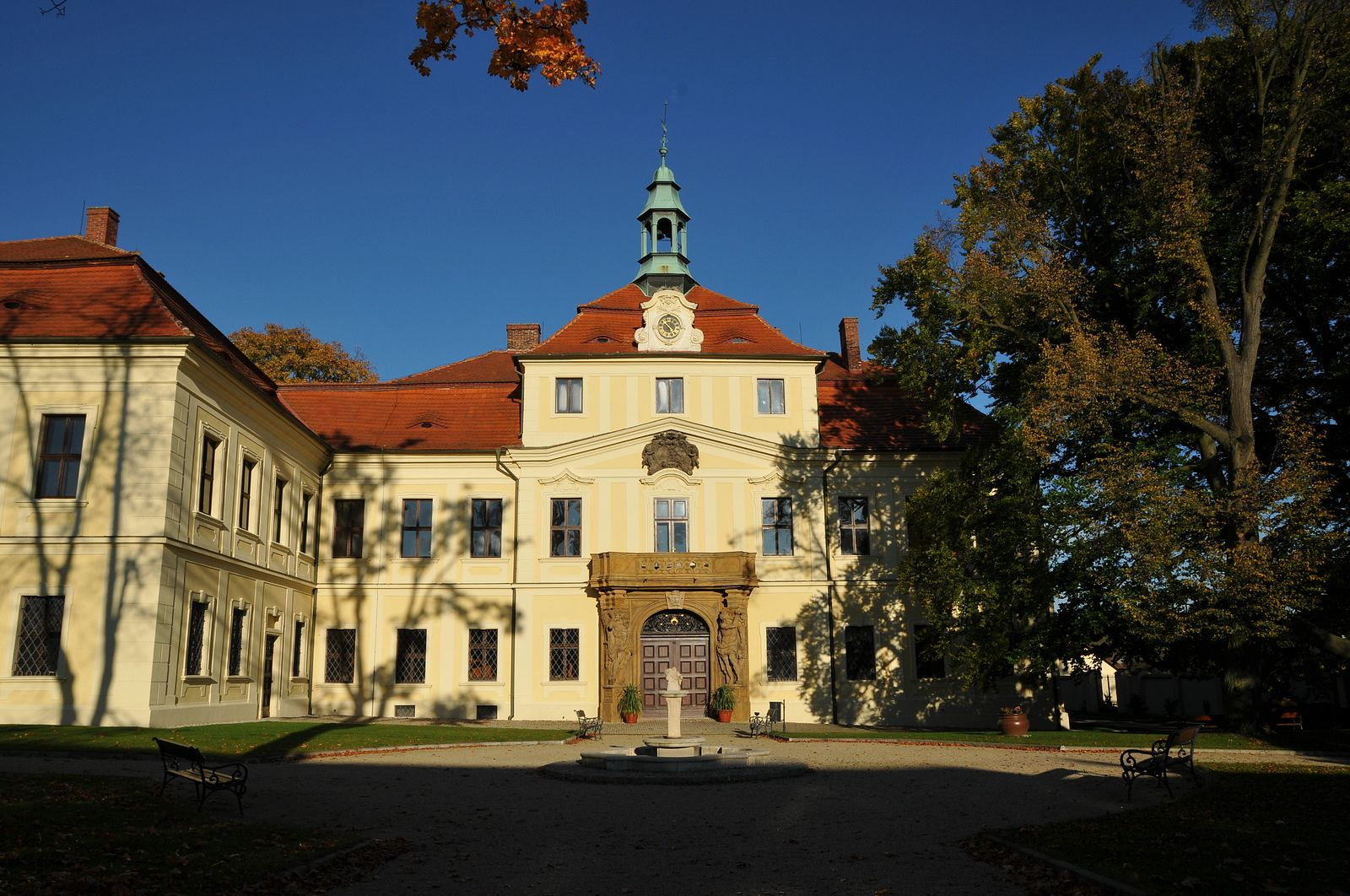
- Mirošov Castle

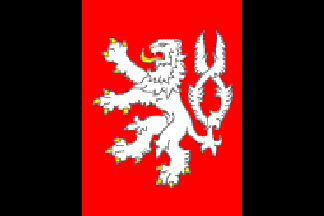
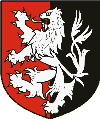
- Flag Coat of arms

- Location in the Czech Republic
- Coordinates: 49°41′33″N 13°39′41″E
- Country: Czech Republic
- Region: Plzeň
- District: Rokycany
- First mentioned: 1366

Government
  - Mayor: Vlastimil Sýkora

Area
  - Total: 13.63 km^{2} (5.26 sq mi)
- Elevation: 457 m (1,499 ft)

Population (2026-01-01)
  - Total: 2,216
  - Density: 162.6/km^{2} (421.1/sq mi)
- Time zone: UTC+1 (CET)
  - Summer (DST): UTC+2 (CEST)
- Postal code: 338 43
- Website: www.mirosov.cz

Mirošov (Czech pronunciation: [ˈmɪroʃof]; German: Miröschau) is a town in Rokycany District in the Plzeň Region of the Czech Republic. It has about 2,200 inhabitants.

== Administrative division ==
Mirošov consists of two municipal parts (in brackets population according to the 2021 census):

- Mirošov (2,364)
- Myť (69)

== Etymology ==
The name is derived from the personal name Miroš (a shortened form of Miroslav), meaning "Miroš's (court)".

== Geography ==
Mirošov is located about 7 kilometres (4 mi) southeast of Rokycany and 19 km (12 mi) east of Plzeň. Most of the municipal territory lies in the Švihov Highlands, but it also extends into the Brdy Highlands in the east. The highest point is at 545 m (1,788 ft) above sea level. The town is situated at the confluence of the streams Skořický potok and Příkosický potok.

== History ==
The first written mention of Mirošov is from 1366, when Dobrohost of Ronšperk donated his estates in Mirošov to the Dominican Order monastery in Plzeň. For centuries, the village was owned by various feudal families. At the end of the 18th century, as a result of cutting down forests for charcoal, the Myť settlement was established.

In 19th century, the face of Mirošov and its environs profoundly changed with discovery of coal. In 1834, mining started in the modest dimensions but the real impetus to industrial coal mining was in 1854–1855, when a massive high-quality coal deposit was discovered by prospectors. Rapid development of coal mining industry followed. Mirošov very quickly became a populous municipality and in 1871 it was promoted to a market town, which later became a town.

In 1869, the railway to Rokycany was put into operation. The railway served for cargo transport only creating an intricate network of sidings into local coal pits. In 1879, public transport started too. In 1882 another stretch of this railway opened, connecting Mirošov with Nezvěstice on the main Plzeň–České Budějovice railway artery.

The coal reserves were relatively soon depleted and by 1904 mining stopped in Mirošov. Small-scale mining continued until 1947, when the last small mine was finally closed.

After World War II, Mirošov was the site of an internment camp for ethnic Germans who were to be expelled from the country. The commander of the camp, František Foukal, has been accused of killing 220 of the inmates through maltreatment and direct killings, of which there is photographic evidence for the latter.

== Demographics ==
Historical population

| Year | Pop. | ±% |
|---|---|---|
| 1869 | 1,626 | — |
| 1880 | 2,318 | +42.6% |
| 1890 | 2,388 | +3.0% |
| 1900 | 2,041 | −14.5% |
| 1910 | 1,715 | −16.0% |

| Year | Pop. | ±% |
|---|---|---|
| 1921 | 1,729 | +0.8% |
| 1930 | 1,946 | +12.6% |
| 1950 | 1,826 | −6.2% |
| 1961 | 1,875 | +2.7% |
| 1970 | 2,186 | +16.6% |

| Year | Pop. | ±% |
|---|---|---|
| 1980 | 2,218 | +1.5% |
| 1991 | 2,045 | −7.8% |
| 2001 | 2,237 | +9.4% |
| 2011 | 2,343 | +4.7% |
| 2021 | 2,433 | +3.8% |

Source: Censuses

== Transport ==
Mirošov is located on the railway line of local importance from Rokycany to Příkosice.

== Sights ==
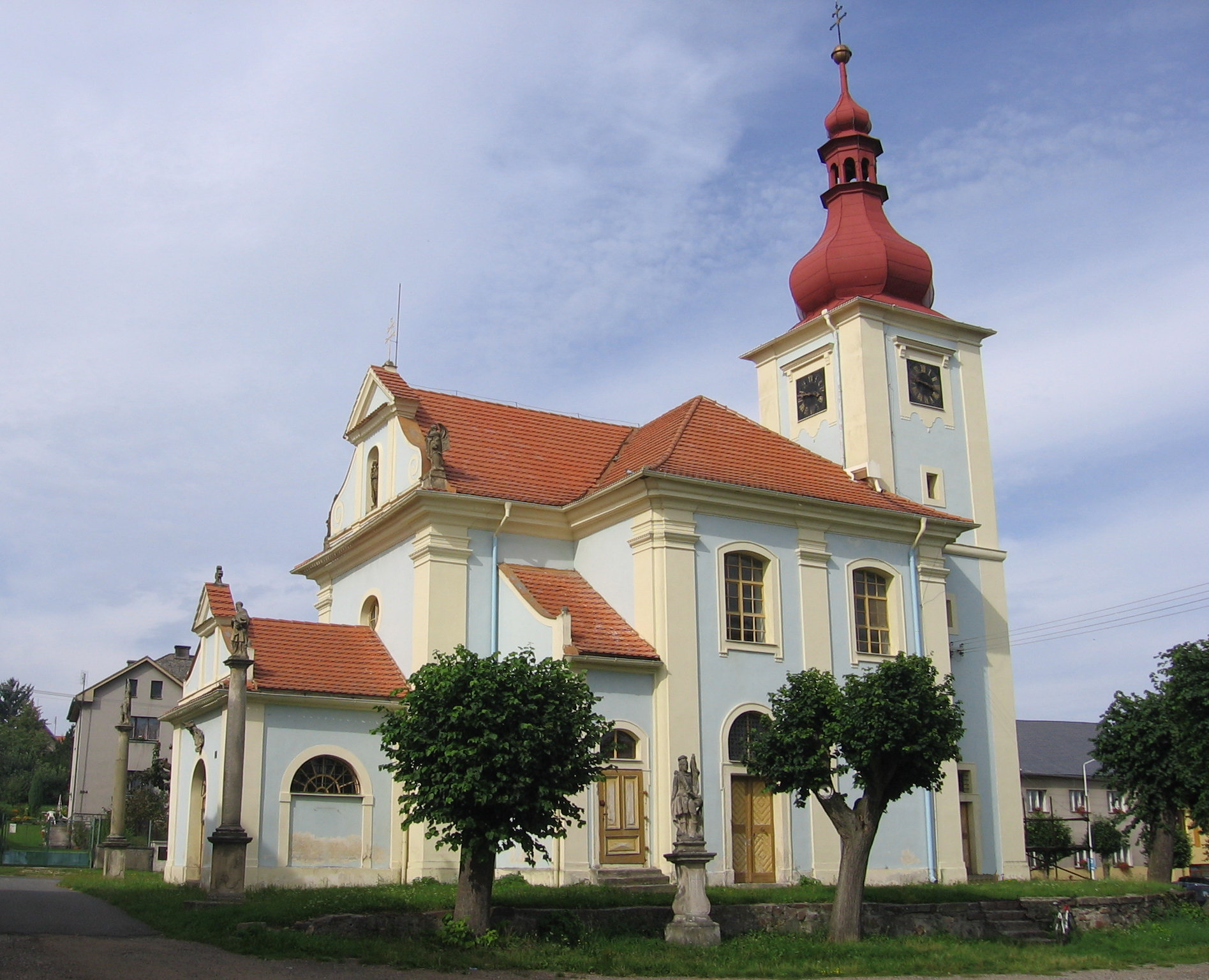
Church of Saint Joseph

Among the main landmarks of the town is the Mirošov Castle. The original Renaissance fortress was rebuilt into the current Baroque castle in 1719–1723. In the 1970s, an attempt to rebuild it failed, it was abandoned and began to dilapidate. Today, the northern wing has been renovated and is used for social purposes.

The Church of Saint Joseph dates from 1693. This Baroque church is the landmark of the town square.

== Notable people ==
- Karel Kašpar (1870–1941), Archbishop of Prague
