= Karel Kašpar =

Czech Cardinal

His Eminence Karel Boromejský Kašpar
- Cardinal, Archbishop of Prague
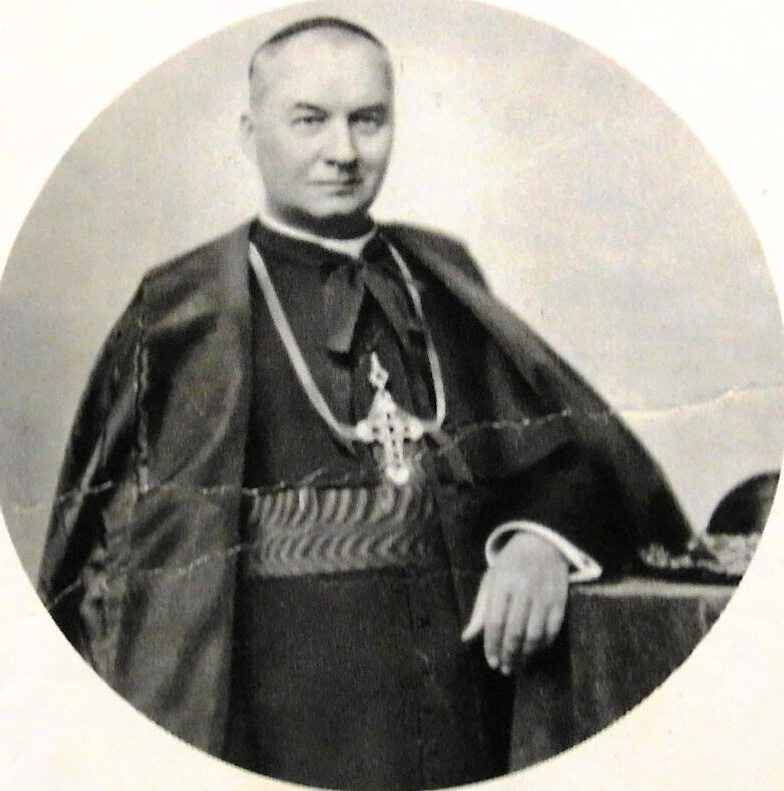
- Church: Roman Catholic
- Archdiocese: Prague
- Installed: 1931
- Term ended: 1941
- Predecessor: František Kordač
- Successor: Josef Beran
- Other posts: Cardinal-Priest of Santi Vitale, Valeria, Gervasio e Protasio
- Previous posts: Auxiliary Bishop of Hradec Králové (1920-1921); Bishop of Hradec Králové (1921-1931)

Orders
- Ordination: 25 February 1893
- Consecration: 11 April 1920
- Created cardinal: 16 December 1935 by Pius XI
- Rank: Cardinal

Personal details
- Born: 16 May 1870 Mirošov, Bohemia, Austria-Hungary
- Died: 21 April 1941 (aged 70) Prague, Protectorate of Bohemia and Moravia
- Buried: St. Vitus Cathedral Prague
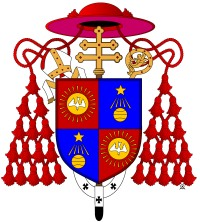
- Coat of arms

Styles of Karel Kašpar
- Reference style: His Eminence
- Spoken style: Your Eminence
- Informal style: Cardinal
- See: Prague

Karel Boromejský Kašpar (16 May 1870 – 21 April 1941) was a Czech Cardinal of the Roman Catholic Church. He served as Archbishop of Prague from 1931 until his death, and was elevated to the cardinalate in 1935.

== Biography ==
Born in Mirošov, Karel Kašpar attended the seminary in Plzeň and the Pontifical Roman Athenaeum S. Apollinare in Rome. He was ordained to the priesthood on 25 February 1893, and then did pastoral work in Svojšín until 1895. He returned to Rome in 1896 where he lived at the priest college Santa Maria dell' Anima. In 1899, he began pastoral work in Prague and was made a canon of its cathedral chapter.

On 8 March 1920 Kašpar was appointed Titular Bishop of Bethsaida and Auxiliary Bishop of Hradec Králové. He received his episcopal consecration on the following 11 April from Archbishop František Kordač. Kašpar was later named Bishop of Hradec Králové on 13 June 1921 and Archbishop of Prague on 22 October 1931. As Prague's archbishop, he was also Primate of the Church in Czechoslovakia.

Pope Pius XI created him Cardinal Priest of Ss. Vitale, Valeria, Gervasio e Protasio in the consistory of 16 December 1935. On the occasion of the visit of King Carol II of Romania to Prague in 1936, Kašpar allowed his flock to eat meat on one Friday. The Czech primate was one of the cardinal electors who participated in the 1939 papal conclave that selected Pope Pius XII.

Kašpar died in Prague, at age 70. He is buried in St. Vitus Cathedral.

Catholic Church titles
Preceded by Josef Doubrava	Bishop of Hradec Králové; 1921–1931	Succeeded by Mořic Pícha
Preceded by František Kordač	Archbishop of Prague; 1931–1941	Succeeded by Josef Beran
