= Seletice =

- Municipality
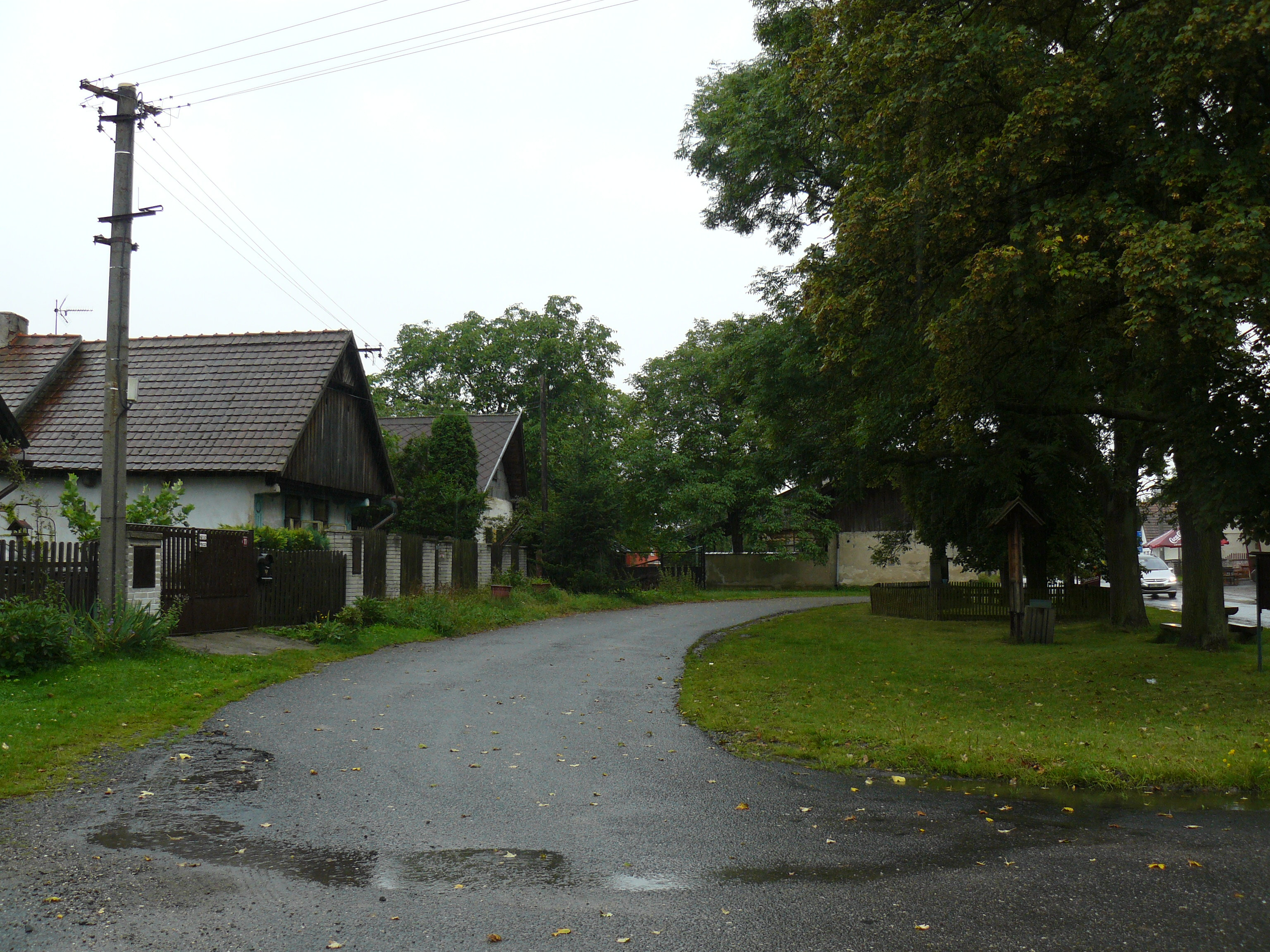
- Centre of Seletice

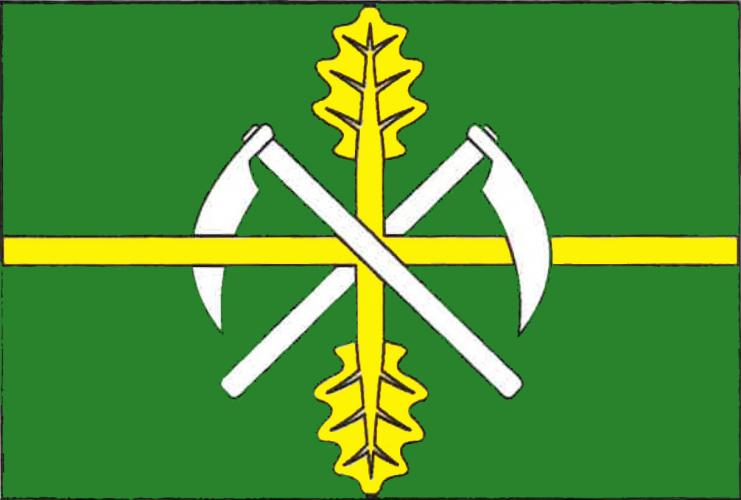
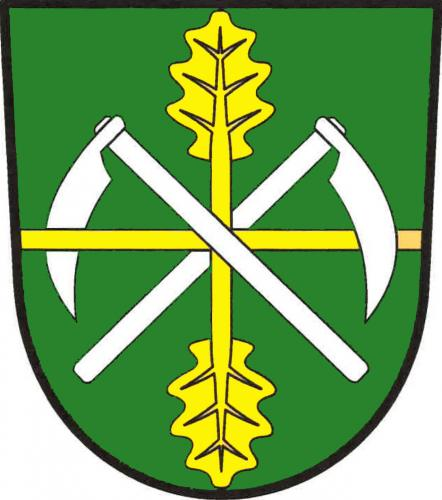
- Flag Coat of arms

- Location in the Czech Republic
- Coordinates: 50°19′13″N 15°5′49″E
- Country: Czech Republic
- Region: Central Bohemian
- District: Nymburk
- First mentioned: 1437

Area
  - Total: 11.38 km^{2} (4.39 sq mi)
- Elevation: 273 m (896 ft)

Population (2026-01-01)
  - Total: 221
  - Density: 19.4/km^{2} (50.3/sq mi)
- Time zone: UTC+1 (CET)
  - Summer (DST): UTC+2 (CEST)
- Postal code: 289 34
- Website: obecseletice.cz

Seletice is a municipality and village in Nymburk District in the Central Bohemian Region of the Czech Republic. It has about 200 inhabitants.

== Demographics ==
Historical population
| Year | Pop. | ±% |
|---|---|---|
| 1869 | 686 | — |
| 1880 | 710 | +3.5% |
| 1890 | 677 | −4.6% |
| 1900 | 598 | −11.7% |
| 1910 | 561 | −6.2% |
| 1921 | 525 | −6.4% |
| 1930 | 462 | −12.0% |
| 1950 | 334 | −27.7% |
| 1961 | 317 | −5.1% |
| 1970 | 245 | −22.7% |
| 1980 | 218 | −11.0% |
| 1991 | 181 | −17.0% |
| 2001 | 156 | −13.8% |
| 2011 | 206 | +32.1% |
| 2021 | 223 | +8.3% |
Source: Censuses

== Notable people ==
- František Kordač (1852–1934), Roman Catholic clergyman
