= František Kordač =

Czech Roman Catholic clergyman

- Archbishop of Prague
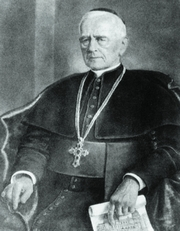
- Church: Catholic Church
- Archdiocese: Archdiocese of Prague
- In office: 16 September 1919 – 21 July 1931
- Predecessor: Pavel Huyn
- Successor: Karel Kašpar
- Other post: Titular Archbishop of Amasea (1931-1934)

Orders
- Ordination: 15 June 1878
- Consecration: 26 October 1919 by Teodoro Valfre di Bonzo

Personal details
- Born: 11 January 1852 Seletice, Kingdom of Bohemia, Austrian Empire
- Died: 26 April 1934 (aged 82) Prague-Zbraslav, Bohemia, Czechoslovakia

František Kordač (11 January 1852, Seletice – 26 April 1934, Prague-Zbraslav) was a Czech Roman Catholic clergyman. He was Archbishop of Prague from 1919 to 1931.

Religious titles
Preceded by Pavel Huyn	Archbishop of Prague; 1919–1931	Succeeded by Karel Kašpar
