= Mukařov (Mladá Boleslav District) =

- Municipality
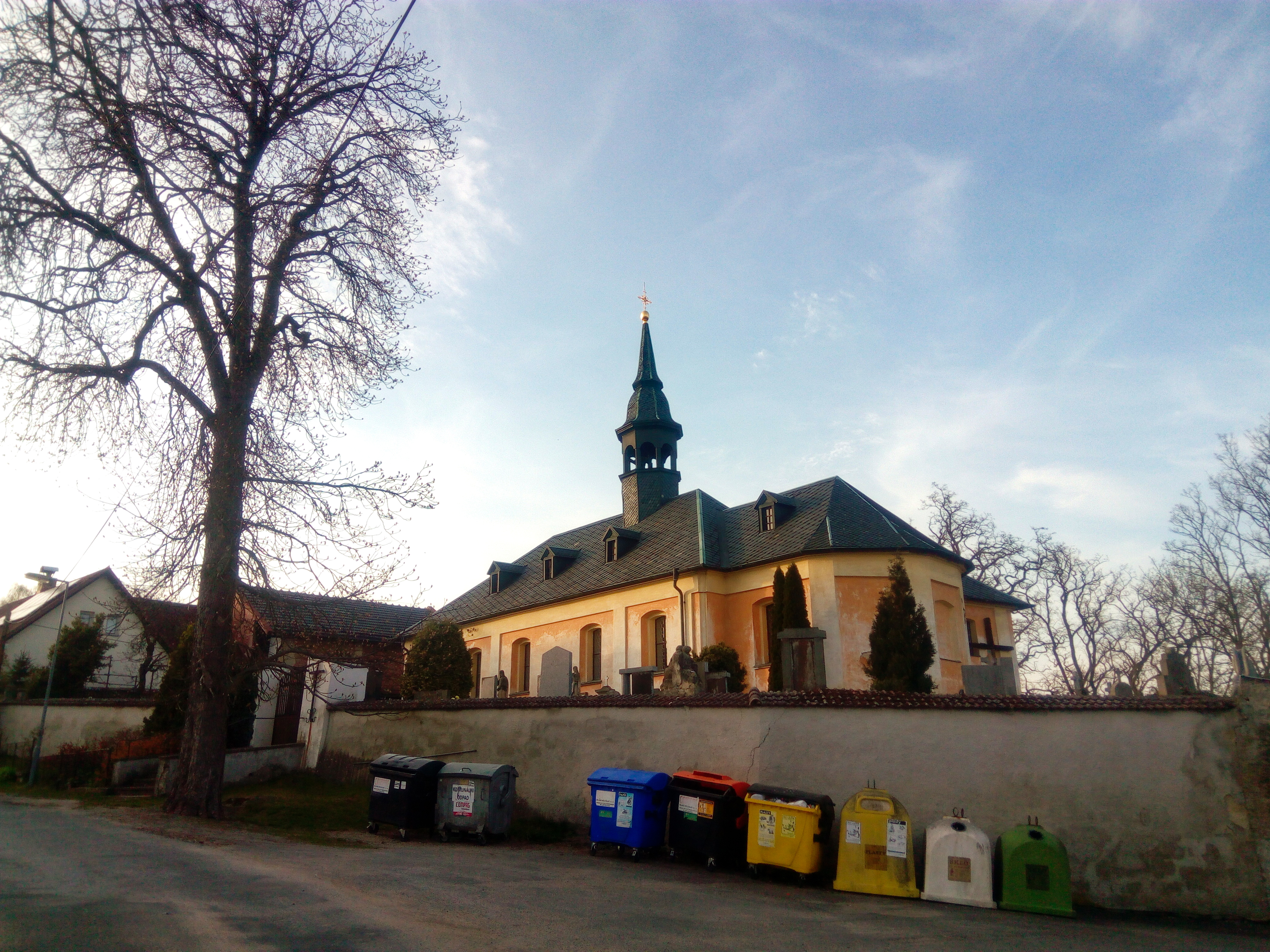
- Church of Saint Lawrence

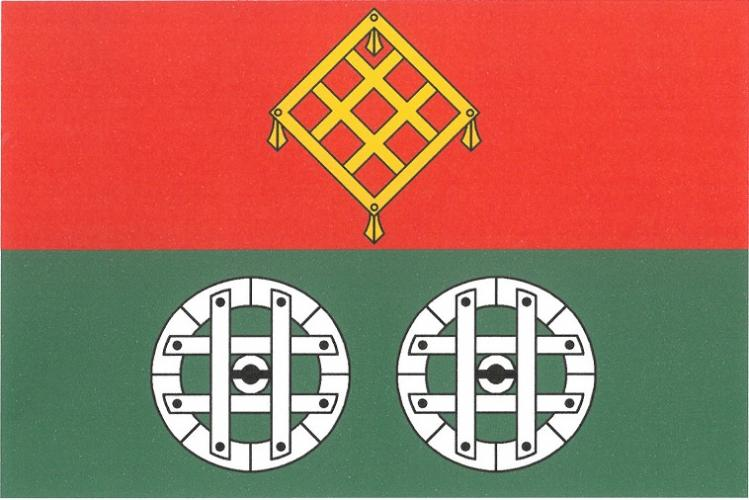
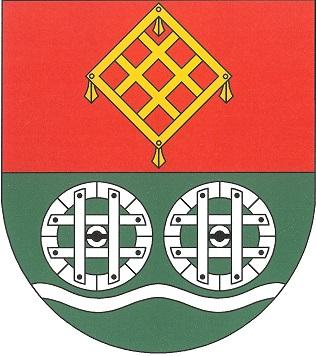
- Flag Coat of arms

- Location in the Czech Republic
- Coordinates: 50°34′9″N 14°55′33″E
- Country: Czech Republic
- Region: Central Bohemian
- District: Mladá Boleslav
- First mentioned: 1352

Area
  - Total: 11.02 km^{2} (4.25 sq mi)
- Elevation: 307 m (1,007 ft)

Population (2026-01-01)
  - Total: 204
  - Density: 18.5/km^{2} (47.9/sq mi)
- Time zone: UTC+1 (CET)
  - Summer (DST): UTC+2 (CEST)
- Postal code: 295 01
- Website: obecmukarov.cz

Mukařov is a municipality and village in Mladá Boleslav District in the Central Bohemian Region of the Czech Republic. It has about 200 inhabitants.

== Administrative division ==
Mukařov consists of three municipal parts (in brackets population according to the 2021 census):

- Mukařov (96)
- Borovice (72)
- Vicmanov (32)

== Etymology ==
The name is derived from the personal name Mukař, meaning "Mukař's (court)". The personal name was derived from the old Czech word mukař, i.e. 'torturer', 'executioner'.

== Geography ==
Mukařov is located about 16 kilometres (10 mi) north of Mladá Boleslav and 60 km (37 mi) northeast of Prague. It lies on the border between the Jizera Table and Jičín Uplands. The highest point is the hill Orlí at 381 m (1,250 ft) above sea level. The Zábrdka Stream flows through the municipality.

== History ==
The first written mention of Mukařov is from 1352. Mukařov, Borovice and Vicmanov were all founded during the colonisation by Cistercian monks from the monastery in nearby Klášter Hradiště nad Jizerou.

== Demographics ==
Historical population

Year	Pop.	±%
1869	742	—
1880	704	−5.1%
1890	666	−5.4%
1900	630	−5.4%
1910	651	+3.3%

Year	Pop.	±%
1921	598	−8.1%
1930	580	−3.0%
1950	376	−35.2%
1961	364	−3.2%
1970	295	−19.0%

Year	Pop.	±%
1980	230	−22.0%
1991	174	−24.3%
2001	171	−1.7%
2011	175	+2.3%
2021	200	+14.3%

Source: Censuses

== Transport ==
There are no railways or major roads passing through the municipality.

== Sights ==
The main landmark of Mukařov is the Church of Saint Lawrence. It is a cemetery church of medieval origin. It was rebuilt in the Neoclassical style in the 18th and 19th centuries.
