= Mukařov (Prague-East District) =

- Municipality
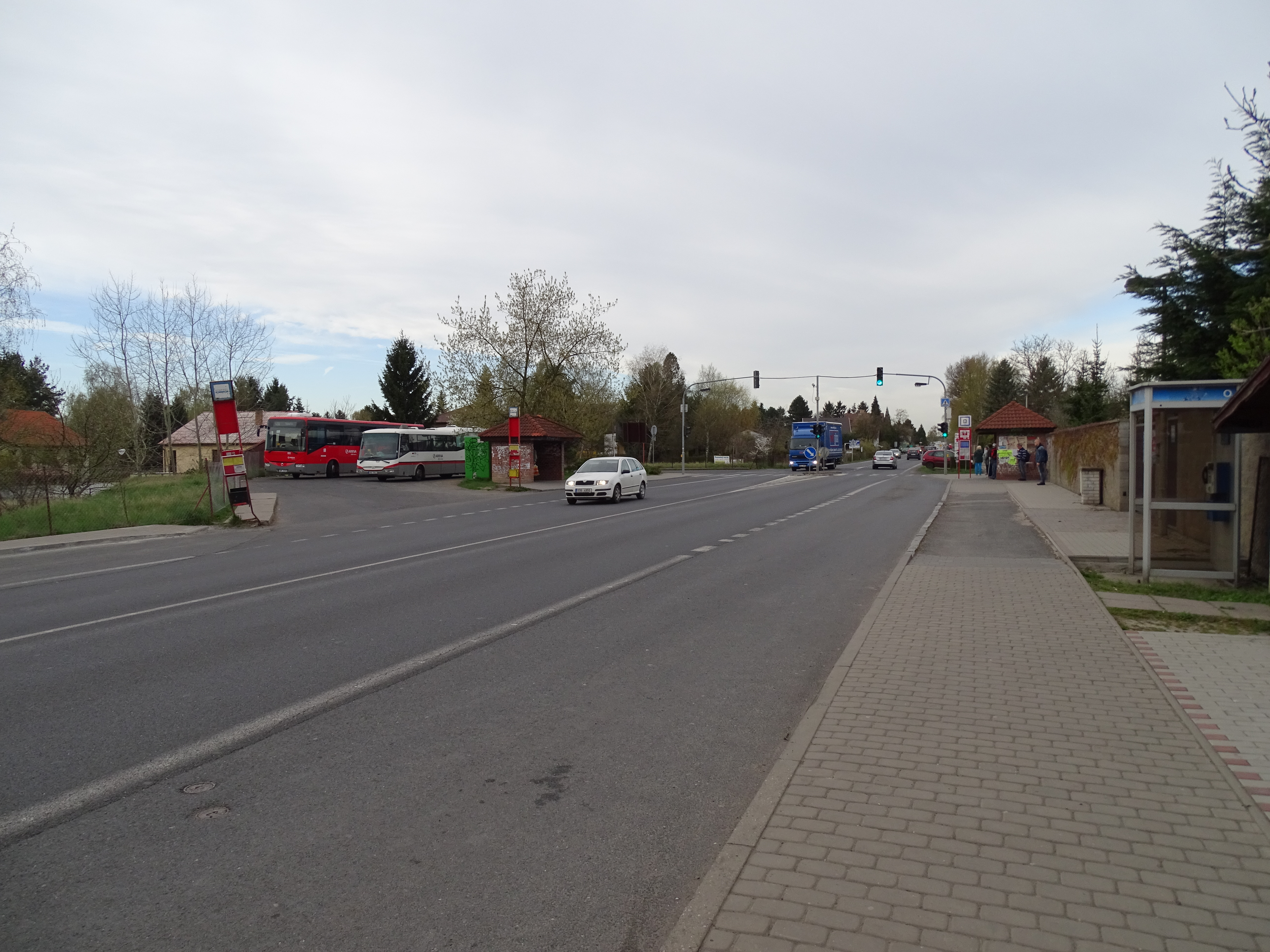
- Main road

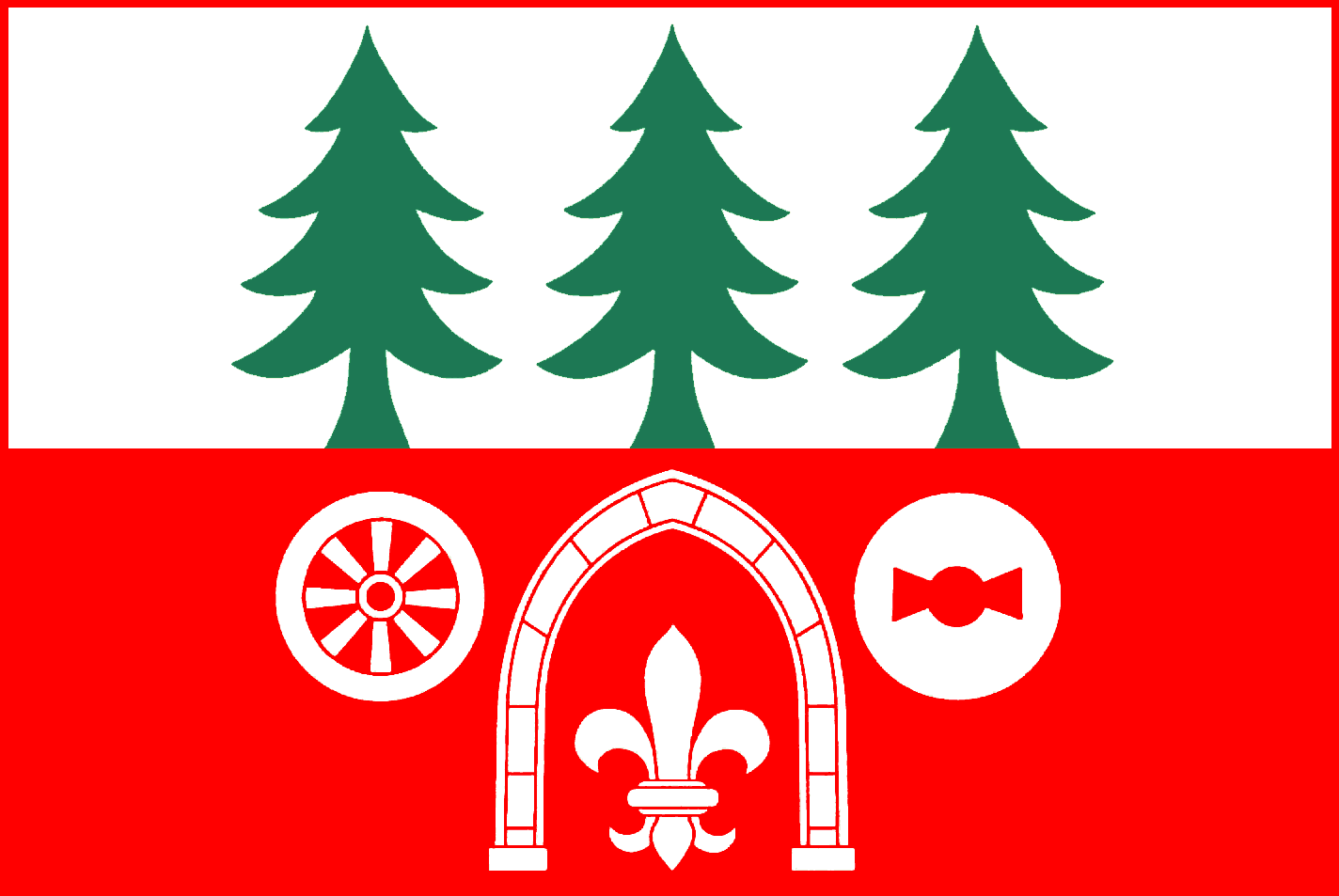
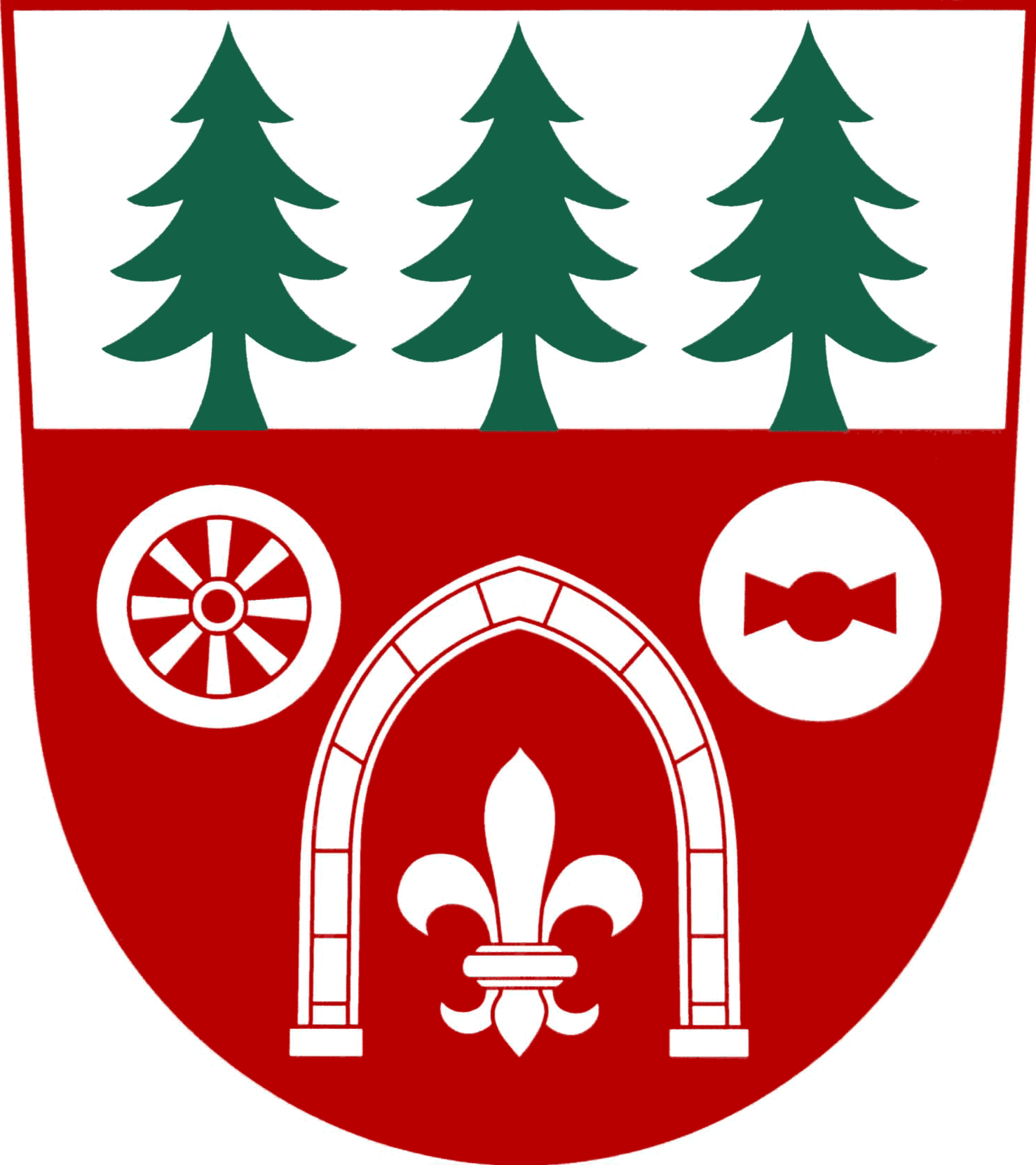
- Flag Coat of arms

- Location in the Czech Republic
- Coordinates: 49°59′28″N 14°44′30″E
- Country: Czech Republic
- Region: Central Bohemian
- District: Prague-East
- First mentioned: 1352

Area
  - Total: 6.33 km^{2} (2.44 sq mi)
- Elevation: 427 m (1,401 ft)

Population (2026-01-01)
  - Total: 3,036
  - Density: 480/km^{2} (1,240/sq mi)
- Time zone: UTC+1 (CET)
  - Summer (DST): UTC+2 (CEST)
- Postal code: 251 62
- Website: www.mukarov.cz

Mukařov (Czech pronunciation: [ˈmukar̝of]) is a municipality and village in Prague-East District in the Central Bohemian Region of the Czech Republic. It has about 3,000 inhabitants.

== Administrative division ==
Mukařov consists of three municipal parts (in brackets population according to the 2021 census):

- Mukařov (1,111)
- Srbín (1,407)
- Žernovka (386)

== Etymology ==
The village was named after Knight Mukar, who is its probable founder.

== Geography ==
Mukařov is located about 17 kilometres (11 mi) east of Prague. It lies in the Benešov Uplands. The highest point is at 469 m (1,539 ft) above sea level. The Výmola Stream originates here and supplies the fishpond Návesní rybník. The second pond in the territory of Mukařov is Požár, supplied by the stream Jevanský potok.

== History ==
After 1158, King Vladislaus II donated the area of today's Mukařov to Knight Mukar, but evidence of the existence of the village does not appear in the following centuries. The first written mention of Mukařov is from 1352, when it was part of the Tehov estate. In 1513, the Tehov estate with Mukařov was bought by the Slavata of Chlum and Košumberk family and was annexed to the Černý Kostelec estate. From that time until the establishment of an independent municipality, it shared the fate and owners with Kostelec. During the Thirty Years' War, the region was badly damaged and was only slowly restored.

== Demographics ==
Historical population

| Year | Pop. | ±% |
|---|---|---|
| 1869 | 412 | — |
| 1880 | 441 | +7.0% |
| 1890 | 447 | +1.4% |
| 1900 | 442 | −1.1% |
| 1910 | 521 | +17.9% |

| Year | Pop. | ±% |
|---|---|---|
| 1921 | 610 | +17.1% |
| 1930 | 698 | +14.4% |
| 1950 | 782 | +12.0% |
| 1961 | 938 | +19.9% |
| 1970 | 932 | −0.6% |

| Year | Pop. | ±% |
|---|---|---|
| 1980 | 1,033 | +10.8% |
| 1991 | 995 | −3.7% |
| 2001 | 1,232 | +23.8% |
| 2011 | 2,196 | +78.2% |
| 2021 | 2,904 | +32.2% |

Source: Censuses

== Economy ==
The municipality is known for a granite quarry, located near the village of Žernovka.

== Transport ==
The I/2 road from Prague to Kutná Hora and Pardubice rums through the municipality.

== Sights ==
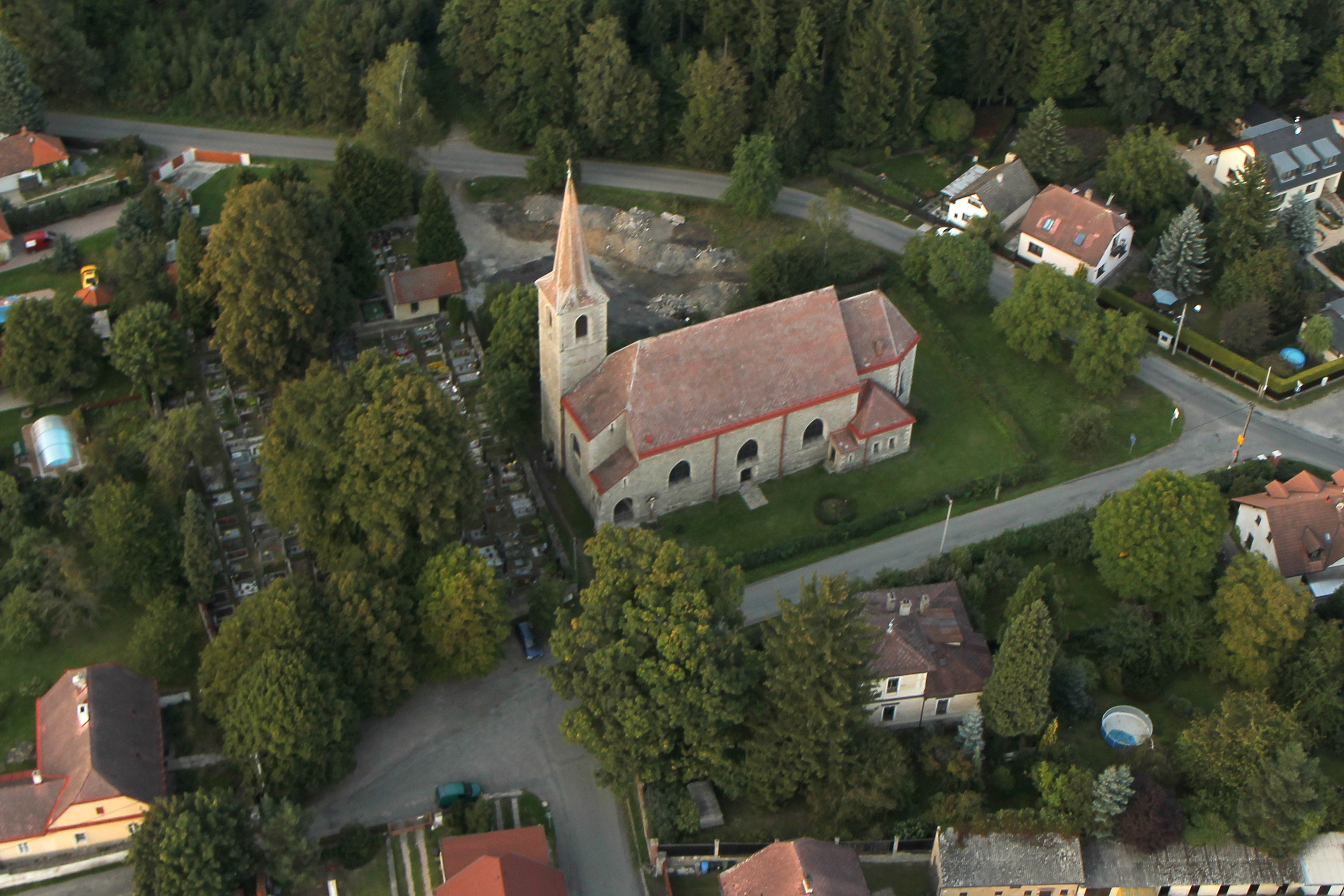
Church of the Assumption of the Virgin Mary

The main landmark of Mukařov is the Church of the Assumption of the Virgin Mary. A Gothic church with Baroque modifications was demolished in 1890 and the current church was built in the neo-Gothic style on its site in 1890–1893. It was built from granite that was quarried in the territory of Mukařov.
