= Tehov (Prague-East District) =

- Municipality
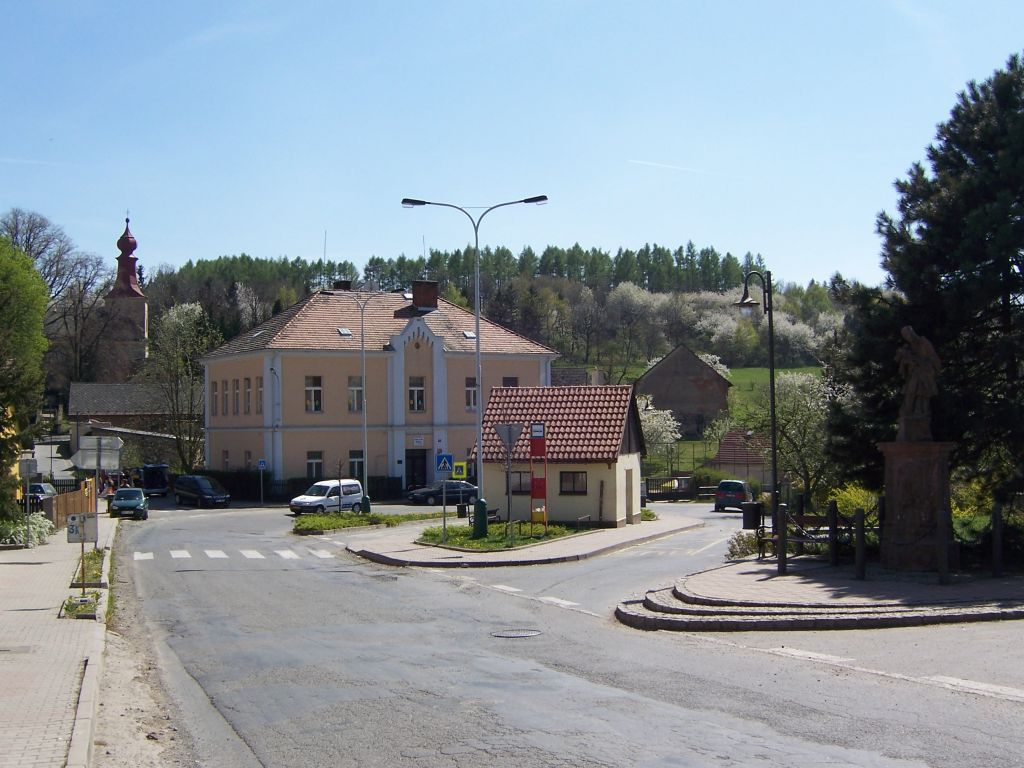
- Centre of Tehov

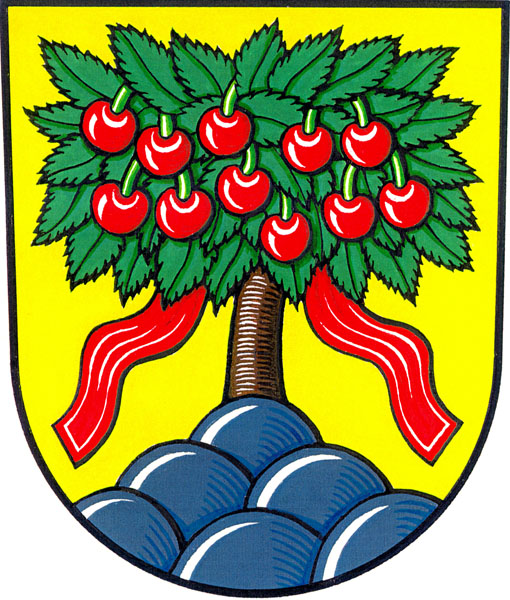
- Flag Coat of arms

- Location in the Czech Republic
- Coordinates: 49°58′18″N 14°41′38″E
- Country: Czech Republic
- Region: Central Bohemian
- District: Prague-East
- First mentioned: 1309

Area
  - Total: 8.19 km^{2} (3.16 sq mi)
- Elevation: 437 m (1,434 ft)

Population (2026-01-01)
  - Total: 1,196
  - Density: 146/km^{2} (378/sq mi)
- Time zone: UTC+1 (CET)
  - Summer (DST): UTC+2 (CEST)
- Postal code: 251 01
- Website: www.tehov.cz

Tehov is a municipality and village in Prague-East District in the Central Bohemian Region of the Czech Republic. It has about 1,200 inhabitants.

== Etymology ==
The initial name of the settlement was probably Těhov. The name was derived from the personal name Těh, meaning "Těh's (court)". Until 1919, the municipality was called Velký Tehov ('great Tehov').

== Geography ==
Tehov is located about 13 kilometres (8 mi) southeast of Prague. It lies in the Benešov Uplands. The highest point is at 486 m (1,594 ft) above sea level. The stream Říčanský potok originates here and flows to the west.

== History ==
The first written mention of Tehov is from 1309. There was a castle, founded in the 12th century. In 1547, the castle was already described as abandoned. the villagers gradually dismantled it into building material for their houses.

== Demographics ==
Historical population

Year	Pop.	±%
1869	476	—
1880	426	−10.5%
1890	468	+9.9%
1900	446	−4.7%
1910	465	+4.3%

Year	Pop.	±%
1921	438	−5.8%
1930	420	−4.1%
1950	379	−9.8%
1961	414	+9.2%
1970	314	−24.2%

Year	Pop.	±%
1980	319	+1.6%
1991	316	−0.9%
2001	363	+14.9%
2011	789	+117.4%
2021	1,162	+47.3%

Source: Censuses

== Transport ==
The I/2 road (the section from Prague to Kutná Hora) runs through the northern part of the municipality.

== Sights ==
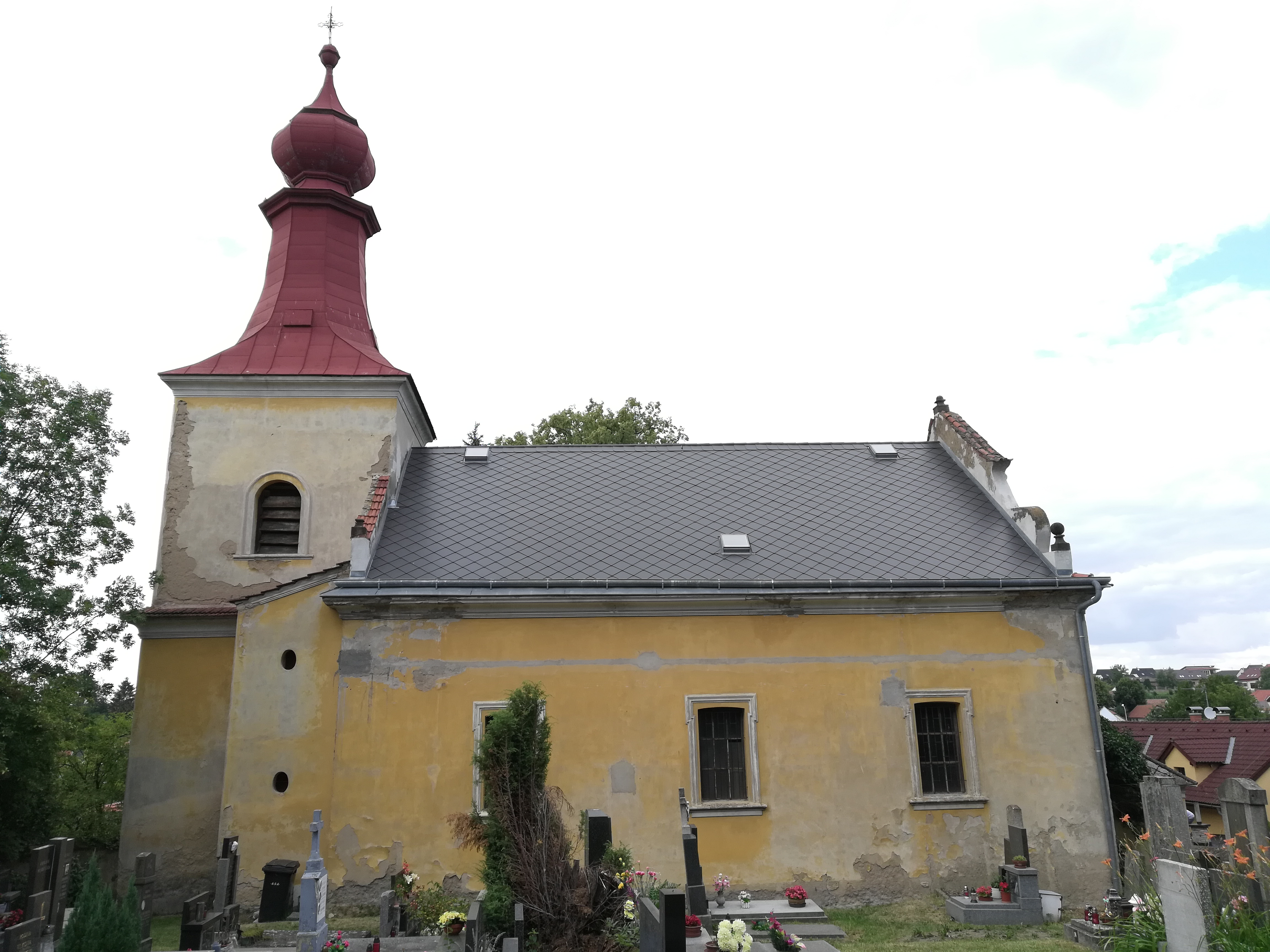
Church of Saint John the Baptist

The main landmark of Tehov is the Church of Saint John the Baptist. It is a Baroque church with the core from the second half of the 14th century. The tower was added in 1779.
