= Květnice =

- Municipality
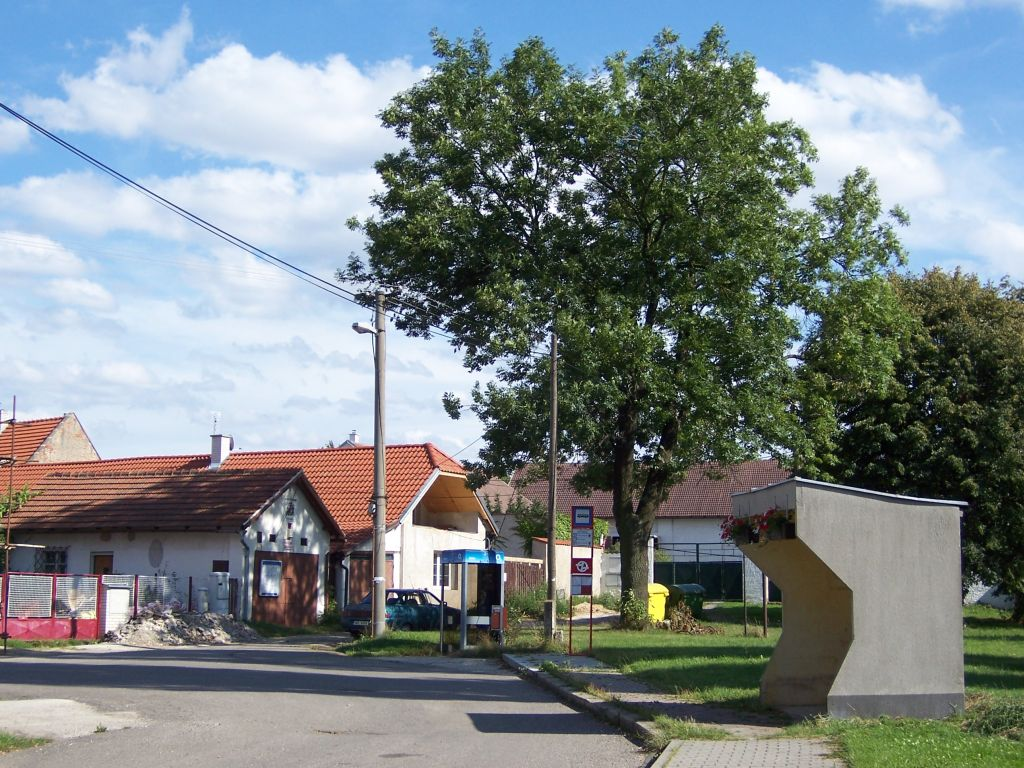
- Centre of Květnice

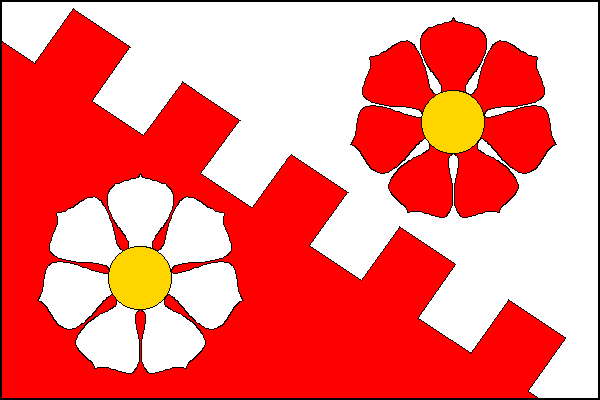
- Flag Coat of arms

- Location in the Czech Republic
- Coordinates: 50°3′26″N 14°41′3″E
- Country: Czech Republic
- Region: Central Bohemian
- District: Prague-East
- First mentioned: 1352

Area
  - Total: 2.83 km^{2} (1.09 sq mi)
- Elevation: 274 m (899 ft)

Population (2026-01-01)
  - Total: 2,120
  - Density: 749/km^{2} (1,940/sq mi)
- Time zone: UTC+1 (CET)
  - Summer (DST): UTC+2 (CEST)
- Postal code: 250 84
- Website: www.kvetnice.eu

Květnice is a municipality and village in Prague-East District in the Central Bohemian Region of the Czech Republic. It has about 2,100 inhabitants.

== Etymology ==
The name was derived from the adjective květná, i.e. 'flowery' in Czech.

== Geography ==
Květnice is located about 13 kilometres (8 mi) east of Prague. It lies in a flat landscape in the Prague Plateau. The Výmola Stream flows through the municipality. The fishpond Mlýnský rybník is located on the stream in the centre of the village.

== History ==
The first written mention of Květnice is from 1352. Until 1510, the village was owned by various lesser noblemen. In 1510, Květnice became a part of the Škvorec estate, which remained so until 1850, when independent municipalities were established and Květnice became a municipal part of Dobročovice. From 1923, Květnice was a separate municipality, only in 1964–1990 it was a part of Sibřina.

== Demographics ==
Historical population

| Year | Pop. | ±% |
|---|---|---|
| 1869 | 248 | — |
| 1880 | 207 | −16.5% |
| 1890 | 193 | −6.8% |
| 1900 | 268 | +38.9% |
| 1910 | 285 | +6.3% |

| Year | Pop. | ±% |
|---|---|---|
| 1921 | 254 | −10.9% |
| 1930 | 290 | +14.2% |
| 1950 | 231 | −20.3% |
| 1961 | 171 | −26.0% |
| 1970 | 164 | −4.1% |

| Year | Pop. | ±% |
|---|---|---|
| 1980 | 136 | −17.1% |
| 1991 | 115 | −15.4% |
| 2001 | 120 | +4.3% |
| 2011 | 1,672 | +1293.3% |
| 2021 | 2,205 | +31.9% |

Source: Censuses

== Transport ==
There are no railways or major roads passing through the municipality.

== Sights ==
The only protected cultural monument in the municipality is the remains of a small medieval castle. The castle was probably built in the 1390s and was first documented in 1418. At the beginning of the 16th century, it was described as abandoned. Fragments of the palace and perimeter walls have been preserved.
