= Italian orthography =

Orthography of the Italian language

Italian orthography (the conventions used in writing Italian) uses the Latin alphabet to write the Italian language. This article focuses on the writing of Standard Italian, based historically on the Florentine variety of Tuscan.

Written Italian is very regular and almost completely phonemic—having an almost one-to-one correspondence between letters (or sequences of letters) and sounds (or sequences of sounds). The main exceptions are that stress placement and vowel quality (for ⟨e⟩ and ⟨o⟩) are not notated, ⟨s⟩ and ⟨z⟩ may be voiced or not, ⟨i⟩ and ⟨u⟩ may represent vowels or semivowels, and a silent ⟨h⟩ is used in a very few cases other than the digraphs ⟨ch⟩ and ⟨gh⟩ (used for the hard ⟨c⟩ and ⟨g⟩ sounds before ⟨e⟩ and ⟨i⟩).

== Alphabet ==
The base alphabet consists of 21 letters: five vowels (A, E, I, O, U) and 16 consonants. The letters J, K, W, X and Y are not native to Italian, but appear in words of ancient Greek origin (e.g. Xilofono), loanwords (e.g. "weekend"), foreign names (e.g. John), scientific terms (e.g. km) and in a handful of native words—such as the names Kalsa, Jesolo, Bettino Craxi, and Cybo, which all derive from regional languages. In addition, grave and acute accents may modify vowel letters; the circumflex is much rarer and is found only in older texts.

An Italian computer keyboard layout

An Italian handwriting script, taught in primary school

Letter	Name	IPA	Diacritics
A, a	a [ˈa]	/a/	à
B, b	bi [ˈbi]	/b/	
C, c	ci [ˈtʃi]	/k/ or /tʃ/	
D, d	di [ˈdi]	/d/	
E, e	e [ˈe]	/e/ or /ɛ/	è, é
F, f	effe [ˈɛffe]	/f/	
G, g	gi [ˈdʒi]	/ɡ/ or /dʒ/	
H, h	acca [ˈakka]	∅ silent	
I, i	i [ˈi]	/i/ or /j/	ì, í, [î]
L, l	elle [ˈɛlle]	/l/	
M, m	emme [ˈɛmme]	/m/	
N, n	enne [ˈɛnne]	/n/	
O, o	o [ˈɔ]	/o/ or /ɔ/	ò, ó
P, p	pi [ˈpi]	/p/	
Q, q	cu (qu) [ˈku]	/k/	
R, r	erre [ˈɛrre]	/r/	
S, s	esse [ˈɛsse]	/s/ or /z/	
T, t	ti [ˈti]	/t/	
U, u	u [ˈu]	/u/ or /w/	ù, ú
V, v	vu [ˈvu], vi [ˈvi]	/v/	
Z, z	zeta [ˈdzɛːta]	/ts/ or /dz/	

Double consonants represent true geminates and are pronounced as such: anno, "year", pronounced [ˈanno] (cf. English ten nails). The short–long length contrast is phonemic, e.g. ritto [ˈritto], "upright", vs. rito [ˈriːto], "rite, ritual", carro [ˈkarro], "cart, wagon", vs. caro [ˈkaːro], "dear, expensive".

== Vowels ==
The Italian alphabet has five vowel letters, ⟨a e i o u⟩. Of those, only ⟨a⟩ represents one sound value, while all others have two. In addition, ⟨e⟩ and ⟨i⟩ indicate a different pronunciation of a preceding ⟨c⟩ or ⟨g⟩ (see below).

In stressed syllables, ⟨e⟩ represents both open /ɛ/ and close /e/. Similarly, ⟨o⟩ represents both open /ɔ/ and close /o/ (see Italian phonology for further details on those sounds). There is typically no orthographic distinction between the open and close sounds represented, although accent marks are used in certain instances (see below). There are some minimal pairs, called heteronyms, where the same spelling is used for distinct words with distinct vowel sounds. In unstressed syllables, only the close variants occur.

In addition to representing the vowels /i/ and /u/, ⟨i⟩ and ⟨u⟩ also typically represent the semivowels /j/ and /w/, when unstressed and occurring before another vowel. Many exceptions exist (e.g. attuale, deciduo, deviare, dioscuro, fatuo, iato, inebriare, ingenuo, liana, proficuo, riarso, viaggio). An ⟨i⟩ or an ⟨e⟩ may indicate that a preceding ⟨c⟩ or ⟨g⟩ is "soft" (ciao).

== C and G ==
The letters ⟨c⟩ and ⟨g⟩ represent the plosives /k/ and /ɡ/ before ⟨h⟩ and before the vowels ⟨a⟩, ⟨o⟩, ⟨u⟩. They represent the affricates /tʃ/ and /dʒ/ when they precede a front vowel (⟨i⟩ or ⟨e⟩).

The letter ⟨i⟩ can also function within digraphs (two letters representing one sound) ⟨ci⟩ and ⟨gi⟩ to indicate "soft" (affricate) /tʃ/ or /dʒ/ before another vowel. In these instances, the vowel following the digraph is stressed, and ⟨i⟩ represents no vowel sound: ciò (/tʃɔ/), giù (/dʒu/). An item such as CIA "CIA", pronounced /ˈtʃi.a/ with /i/ stressed, contains no digraph.

For words of more than one syllable, stress position must be known in order to distinguish between digraph ⟨ci⟩ or ⟨gi⟩ containing no actual phonological vowel /i/ and sequences of affricate and stressed /i/. For example, the words camicia, "shirt", and farmacia, "pharmacy", share the spelling ⟨-cia⟩, but contrast in that only the first ⟨i⟩ is stressed in camicia, thus ⟨-cia⟩ represents /tʃa/ with no /i/ sound (likewise, grigio ends in /dʒo/ and the names Gianni and Gianna contain only two actual vowels: /ˈdʒanni/, /ˈdʒanna/). In farmacia /i/ is stressed, so that ⟨ci⟩ is not a digraph but represents two of the three constituents of /ˈtʃi.a/.

When the "hard" (plosive) pronunciation /k/ or /ɡ/ occurs before a front vowel ⟨i⟩ or ⟨e⟩, digraphs ⟨ch⟩ and ⟨gh⟩ are used, so that ⟨che⟩ represents /ke/ or /kɛ/ and ⟨chi⟩ represents /ki/ or /kj/. The same principle applies to ⟨gh⟩: ⟨ghe⟩ and ⟨ghi⟩ represent /ɡe/ or /ɡɛ/ and /ɡi/ or /ɡj/.

In the evolution from Latin to Italian, the postalveolar affricates /tʃ/ and /dʒ/ were contextual variants of the velar consonants /k/ and /ɡ/. They eventually came to be full phonemes, and orthographic adjustments were introduced to distinguish them. The phonemicity of the affricates can be demonstrated with minimal pairs:

	Plosive		Affricate	
Before ⟨i⟩, ⟨e⟩	ch	china /ˈkina/ "India ink"	c	Cina /ˈtʃina/ "China"
Before ⟨i⟩, ⟨e⟩	gh	ghiro /ˈɡiro/ "dormouse"	g	giro /ˈdʒiro/ "lap", "tour"
Elsewhere	c	caramella /karaˈmɛlla/ "candy"	ci	ciaramella /tʃaraˈmɛlla/ "shawm"
Elsewhere	g	gallo /ˈɡallo/ "rooster"	gi	giallo /ˈdʒallo/ "yellow"

The trigraphs ⟨cch⟩ and ⟨ggh⟩ are used to indicate geminate /kk/ and /ɡɡ/, when they occur before ⟨i⟩ or ⟨e⟩; e.g. occhi /ˈɔkki/ "eyes", agghindare /aɡɡinˈdare/ "to dress up". The double letters ⟨cc⟩ and ⟨gg⟩ before ⟨i⟩ or ⟨e⟩ and ⟨cci⟩ and ⟨ggi⟩ before other vowels represent the geminated affricates /ttʃ/ and /ddʒ/, e. g. riccio, "hedgehog", peggio, "worse".

⟨g⟩ joins with ⟨l⟩ to form a digraph representing palatal /ʎ/ before ⟨i⟩ (before other vowels, the trigraph ⟨gli⟩ is used), and with ⟨n⟩ to represent /ɲ/ with any vowel following. Between vowels these are pronounced phonetically long, as in /ˈaʎʎo/ aglio, "garlic", /ˈoɲɲi/ ogni, "each". By way of exception, ⟨gl⟩ before ⟨i⟩ represents /ɡl/ in some words derived from Greek, such as glicine, "wisteria", from learned Latin, such as negligente, "negligent", and in a few adaptations from other languages such as glissando /ɡlisˈsando/, partially italianised from French glissant. ⟨gl⟩ before vowels other than ⟨i⟩ represents straightforward /ɡl/.

The digraph ⟨sc⟩ is used before ⟨e⟩ and ⟨i⟩ to represent /ʃ/; before other vowels, ⟨sci⟩ is used for /ʃ/. Otherwise, ⟨sc⟩ represents /sk/, the ⟨c⟩ of which follows the normal orthographic rules explained above.

	/sk/		/ʃ/	
Before ⟨i e⟩	sch	scherno /ˈskɛrno/	sc	scerno /ˈʃɛrno/
Elsewhere	sc	scalo /ˈskalo/	sci	scialo /ˈʃalo/

Intervocalic /ʎ/, /ɲ/, /ts/, /dz/, and /ʃ/ are always geminated and except for /ts/ and /dz/, no orthographic distinction is made to indicate this.

Some words are spelled with ⟨cie⟩, ⟨gie⟩, and ⟨scie⟩. Historically, the letters ⟨ie⟩ in these combinations represented a diphthong, but in modern pronunciation these combinations are indistinguishable from ⟨ce⟩, ⟨ge⟩, and ⟨sce⟩. Notable examples: cieco /ˈtʃɛko/ "blind" (homophonous with ceco, "Czech"), cielo /ˈtʃɛlo/ "sky" (homophonous with celo, "I conceal"), scienza /ˈʃɛntsa/ "science".

The plurals of words ending in -⟨cia⟩, -⟨gia⟩ are written with -⟨cie⟩, -⟨gie⟩ if preceded by a vowel (camicia, "skirt" → camicie, "skirts", valigia, "suitcase" → valigie, "suitcases") or with -⟨ce⟩, -⟨ge⟩ if preceded by a consonant (provincia, "province" → province, "provinces"). This rule has been established since the 1950s; prior to that, etymological spellings such as valige and provincie were in use.

The letter combination ⟨gnia⟩ is pronounced the same as ⟨gna⟩ and occurs when the ending -iamo (1st person plural present indicative and 1st person plural present subjunctive) or -iate (2nd person plural present subjunctive) is attached to a stem ending in ⟨gn⟩: sognare, "to dream" → sogniamo, "we dream".

== C and Q ==
Normally /kw/ is represented by ⟨qu⟩, but it is represented by ⟨cu⟩ in some words, such as cuoco, cuoio, cuore, scuola, scuotere, and percuotere. These words all contain a /kwɔ/ sequence derived from an original /kɔ/ which was subsequently diphthongised. The sequence /kkw/ is always spelled ⟨cqu⟩ (e.g. acqua), with exceptions being spelled ⟨qqu⟩ in the words soqquadro, its derivation soqquadrare, and beqquadro and biqquadro, two alternative forms of bequadro or biquadro.

== S and Z ==
⟨s⟩ and ⟨z⟩ are ambiguous to voicing.

⟨s⟩ represents a dental sibilant consonant, either /s/ or /z/. However, these two phonemes are in complementary distribution everywhere except between two vowels in the same word and, even with such words, there are very few minimal pairs.

- The voiceless /s/ occurs:
  - At the start of a word before a vowel (e.g. Sara /ˈsara/) or a voiceless consonant (e.g. spuntare /spunˈtare/)
  - After any consonant (e.g. transitare /transiˈtare/)
  - In the middle of a word before a voiceless consonant (e.g. raspa /ˈraspa/)
  - At the start of the second part of a compound word (e.g. affittasi, disotto, girasole, prosegue, risaputo, reggiseno). These words are formed by adding a prefix or a root to a word or suffix beginning with /s/
- The voiced /z/ occurs before voiced consonants (e.g. sbranare /zbraˈnare/).
- It can be either voiceless or voiced (/s/ or /z/) between vowels; in standard Tuscany-based pronunciation some words are pronounced with /s/ between vowels (e.g. casa, cosa, così, mese, naso, peso, cinese, piemontese, goloso), but most words are pronounced with /z/ (e.g. bisogno, rosa, cisalpino, medesimo, invaso); in Northern Italy (and also increasingly in Tuscany) ⟨s⟩ between vowels is always pronounced with /z/ whereas in Southern Italy ⟨s⟩ between vowels is always pronounced /s/.

⟨ss⟩ always represents voiceless /ss/: grosso /ˈɡrɔsso/, successo /sutˈtʃɛsso/, passato /pasˈsato/, etc.

⟨z⟩ represents a dental affricate consonant; either /dz/ (zanzara /dzanˈdzara/) or /ts/ (canzone /kanˈtsone/), depending on context, although there are few minimal pairs.

- It is normally voiceless /ts/:
  - At the start of a word in which the second syllable starts with a voiceless consonant (zampa /ˈtsampa/, zoccolo /ˈtsɔkkolo/, zufolo /ˈtsufolo/)
    - Exceptions (because they are of Greek origin): zaffiro, zefiro, zotico, zeta, zafferano, Zacinto
  - When followed by an ⟨i⟩ which is followed, in turn, by another vowel (e.g. zio /ˈtsi.o/, agenzia /adʒenˈtsi.a/, grazie /ˈɡrattsje/)
    - Exceptions: azienda /adˈdzjɛnda/, all words derived from words obeying other rules (e.g. romanziere /romanˈdzjɛre/, which is derived from romanzo)
  - After the letter ⟨l⟩ (e.g. alzare /alˈtsare/)
    - Exceptions: elzeviro /eldzeˈviro/ and Belzebù /beldzeˈbu/
  - In the suffixes -anza, -enza and -onzolo (e.g. usanza /uˈzantsa/, credenza /kreˈdɛntsa/, ballonzolo /balˈlontsolo/)
- It is normally voiced /dz/:
  - At the start of a word in which the second syllable starts with a voiced consonant or the letter ⟨z⟩ itself (e.g. zebra /ˈdzɛbra/, zuzzurellone /dzuddzurelˈlone/)
    - Exceptions: zanna /ˈtsanna/, zigano /tsiˈɡano/, zizza /ˈt͡sit.t͡sa/
  - At the start of a word when followed by two vowels (e.g. zaino /ˈdzaino/)
    - Exceptions: zio and its derived terms (see above)
  - If it is single (not doubled) and between two single vowels (e.g. azalea /addzaˈlɛa/)
    - Exceptions: nazismo /natˈtsizmo/ (from the German pronunciation of ⟨z⟩)

Between vowels and/or semivowels (/j/ and /w/), ⟨z⟩ is pronounced as if doubled (/tts/ or /ddz/, e.g. vizio /ˈvittsjo/, polizia /politˈtsi.a/). Generally, intervocalic z is written doubled, but it is written single in most words where it precedes ⟨i⟩ followed by any vowel and in some learned words.

⟨zz⟩ may represent either a voiceless alveolar affricate /tts/ or its voiced counterpart /ddz/: voiceless in e.g. pazzo /ˈpattso/, ragazzo /raˈɡattso/, pizza /ˈpittsa/, grandezza /ɡranˈdettsa/, voiced in razzo /ˈraddzo/, mezzo /ˈmɛddzo/, azzardo /adˈdzardo/, azzurro /adˈdzurro/, orizzonte /oridˈdzonte/, zizzania /dzidˈdzanja/. Most words are consistently pronounced with /tts/ or /ddz/ throughout Italy in the standard language (e.g. gazza /ˈɡaddza/ "magpie", tazza /ˈtattsa/ "mug"), but a few words, such as frizzare, "effervesce, sting", exist in both voiced and voiceless forms, differing by register or by geographic area, while others have different meanings depending on whether they are pronounced in voiced or voiceless form (e.g. razza: /ˈrattsa/ (race, breed) or /ˈraddza/ (ray, skate)). The verbal ending -izzare from Greek -ίζειν is always pronounced /ddz/ (e.g. organizzare /orɡanidˈdzare/), maintained in both inflected forms and derivations: organizzo /orɡaˈniddzo/ "I organise", organizzazione /orɡaniddzatˈtsjone/ "organisation". Like frizzare above, however, not all verbs ending in -izzare continue suffixed Greek -ίζειν, having instead -izz- as part of the verb stem. Indirizzare, for example, of Latin origin reconstructed as *INDIRECTIARE, has /tts/ in all forms containing the root indirizz-.

== Silent H ==
In addition to being used to indicate a hard ⟨c⟩ or ⟨g⟩ before front vowels (see above), ⟨h⟩ is used to distinguish ho, hai, ha, hanno (present indicative of avere, "to have") from o ("or"), ai ("to the", m. pl.), a ("to"), anno ("year"); since ⟨h⟩ is always silent, there is no difference in the pronunciation of such words. The letter ⟨h⟩ is also used in some interjections, where it always comes immediately after the first vowel in the word (e.g. eh, boh, ahi, ahimè). In filler words ehm and uhm both ⟨h⟩ and the preceding vowel are silent. ⟨h⟩ is used in some loanwords, by far the most common of which is hotel, but also handicap, habitat, hardware, hall ("lobby, foyer"), hamburger, horror, hobby. Silent ⟨h⟩ is also found in some Italian toponyms: Chorio, Dho, Hano, Mathi, Noha, Proh, Rho, Roghudi, Santhià, Tharros, Thiene, Thiesi, Thurio, Vho; and surnames: Dahò, Dehò, De Bartholomaeis, De Thomasis, Matthey, Rahò, Rhodio, Tha, Thei, Theodoli, Thieghi, Thiella, Thiglia, Tholosano, Thomatis, Thorel, Thovez.

== J, K, W, X and Y ==
The letter ⟨j⟩ (i lunga, "long I", or gei) is not considered part of the standard Italian alphabet; however, it is used in some Latin words, in proper nouns (such as Jesi, Letojanni, Juventus, etc.), in words borrowed from foreign languages (most common: jeans, but also jazz, jet, jeep, banjo), and in an archaic spelling of Italian.

Until the 19th century, ⟨j⟩ was used in Italian instead of ⟨i⟩ in word-initial rising diphthongs, as a replacement for final -⟨ii⟩, and between vowels (as in Savoja); this rule was quite strict in official writing.

The letter ⟨j⟩ represents /j/ in Latin and Italian and dialect words such as Romanesco dialect ajo /ˈajjo/ ("garlic"; cf. Italian aglio /ˈaʎʎo/); it represents /dʒ/ in borrowings from English (including judo, borrowed from Japanese via English); and /ʒ/ in borrowings from French (julienne, bijou).

The letters ⟨k⟩ (cappa), ⟨w⟩ (V doppia or doppia V, "double V"), ⟨x⟩ (ics) and ⟨y⟩ (ipsilon or I greca, "Greek I") are not part of the standard Italian alphabet and are used only in unassimilated or partially assimilated loanwords.

The letter ⟨k⟩ is used in karma, kayak, kiwi, kamikaze, etc.; it is always pronounced /k/. It is often used informally among young people as a replacement for ⟨ch⟩, paralleling the use of ⟨k⟩ in English (for example, ke instead of che).

The letter ⟨w⟩ is used in web, whisky, water, "water closet / toilet", western, "Western movie", watt, etc.; it is alternately pronounced /w/ (in web, whisky, western) or /v/ (in water, watt), the latter especially in German loanwords and foreign names. A capital ⟨W⟩ is used as an abbreviation of viva or evviva ("long live"). Although ⟨w⟩ is named V doppia or doppia V, in initialisms such as B. M. W., T. W. A., W. W. F., W. C., www it is normally read simply as vu.

The letter ⟨x⟩ represents either /ks/, as in extra, uxorio, xilofono, or /ɡz/ when it is preceded by ⟨e⟩ and followed by a vowel, e.g. exoterico. In most words, it may be replaced with ⟨s⟩ or ⟨ss⟩ (with different pronunciation: xilofono/silofono, taxi/tassì) or, rarely, by ⟨cs⟩ (with the same pronunciation: claxon/clacson). In some other languages of Italy, it represents /z/ (Venetian), /ʃ/ (Sicilian), or /ʒ/ (Sardinian and Ligurian).

The letter ⟨y⟩ is used in yoga, yogurt, yacht, Uruguay, etc. This letter is sometimes replaced by ⟨i⟩ in some words such as yoga/ioga and yogurt/iogurt, but the spellings with ⟨y⟩ are much more common.

== Diacritics ==
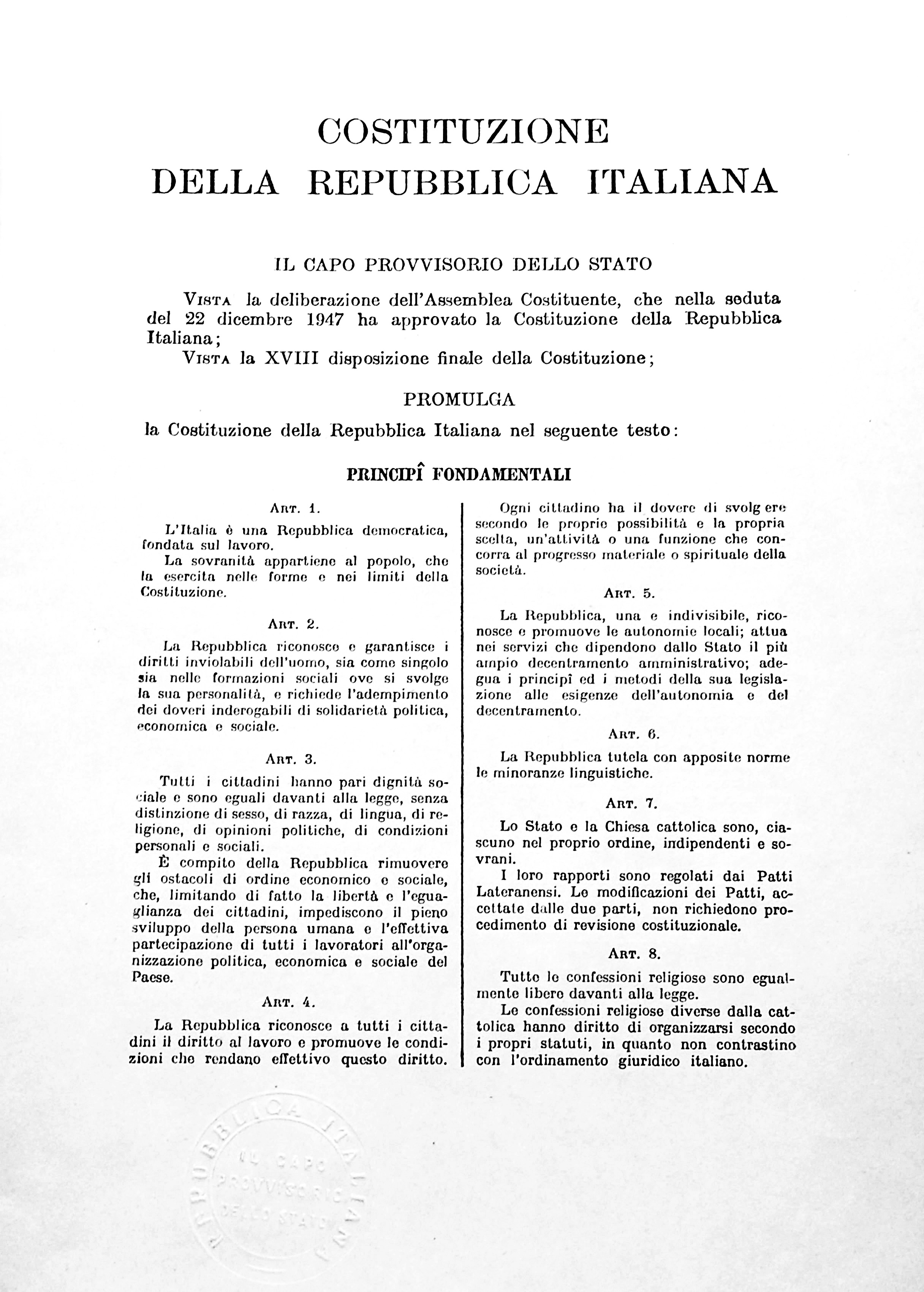
The letter Î in the original version of the Constitution of the Italian Republic in the heading Principî Fondamentali

The acute accent (´) may be used on ⟨é⟩ and ⟨ó⟩ to represent stressed close-mid vowels. This use of accents is generally mandatory only to indicate stress on a word-final vowel; elsewhere, accents are generally found only in dictionaries. Since final ⟨o⟩ is hardly ever close-mid, ⟨ó⟩ is very rarely encountered in written Italian (e.g. metró, "subway", from the original French pronunciation of métro with a final-stressed /o/).

The grave accent (`) is found on ⟨à⟩, ⟨è⟩, ⟨ì⟩, ⟨ò⟩, ⟨ù⟩. It may be used on ⟨è⟩ and ⟨ò⟩ when they represent open-mid vowels. The accents may also be used to differentiate minimal pairs within Italian (for example pèsca, "peach", vs. pésca, "fishing"), but in practice this is limited to didactic texts. In the case of final ⟨ì⟩ and ⟨ù⟩, both diacritics are encountered. By far the most common option is the grave accent, ⟨ì⟩ and ⟨ù⟩, although this may be due to the rarity of the acute accent to represent stress; the alternative of employing the acute, ⟨í⟩ and ⟨ú⟩, is in practice limited to erudite texts, but can be justified as both vowels are high (as in Catalan). However, since there are no corresponding low (or lax) vowels to contrast with in Italian, both choices are equally acceptable.

The circumflex accent (ˆ) can be used to mark the contraction of two unstressed vowels /ii/ ending a word, normally pronounced [i], so that the plural of studio, "study, office", may be written ⟨studi⟩, ⟨studii⟩ or ⟨studî⟩. The form with circumflex is found mainly in older texts, although it may still appear in contexts where ambiguity might arise from homography. For example, it can be used to differentiate words such as geni ("genes", plural of gene) and genî ("geniuses", plural of genio) or principi ("princes", plural of principe) and principî ("principles", plural of principio). In general, current usage usually prefers a single ⟨i⟩ instead of a double ⟨ii⟩ or an ⟨î⟩ with circumflex.

Monosyllabic words generally lack an accent (e.g. ho, me). The accent is written, however, if there is an ⟨i⟩ or a ⟨u⟩ preceding another vowel (più, può). This applies even if the ⟨i⟩ is "silent", i.e. part of the digraphs ⟨ci⟩ or ⟨gi⟩ representing /tʃ/ and /dʒ/ (ciò, giù). It does not apply, however, if the word begins with ⟨qu⟩ (qua, qui). Many monosyllabic words are spelled with an accent in order to avoid ambiguity with other words (e.g. là, lì versus la, li). This is known as accento distintivo and also occurs in other Romance languages (e.g. the Spanish tilde diacrítica).

== Sample text ==
"Nel mezzo del cammin di nostra vita
mi ritrovai per una selva oscura
ché la diritta via era smarrita."

Lines 1–3 of Canto 1 of the Inferno, Part 1 of the Divina Commedia by Dante Alighieri, a highly influential poem. Translation (Longfellow): "Midway upon the journey of our life \ I found myself in a dark wood \ for the straight way was lost."

== See also ==
- Gian Giorgio Trissino, humanist who proposed an orthography in 1524. Some of his proposals were taken.
- Claudio Tolomei, humanist who proposed an orthography in 1525

== Bibliography ==
- Maiden, Martin; Robustelli, Cecilia (2014). A Reference Grammar of Modern Italian (2nd ed.). Routledge. ISBN 9781444116786.
