= Savoia =

Savoia may refer to:

- Savoy, a region of France
- Savoie, Department of France
- House of Savoy, a royal house of Italy until 1946
- Savoia-Marchetti, an Italian aircraft manufacturer
- Savoia Castle, a castle near Prague, Czech Republic
- Savoia di Lucania, a village in the province of Potenza, Italy
- Luigi di Savoia, Libya, the Italian name of Al Abraq, Libya
- SS Conte di Savoia, an Italian ocean liner in service from 1932 to 1945
- SS Savoia, an Italian refrigerated cargo ship in service from 1922 to 1968
- FC Savoia 1908, an Italian football club located in Torre Annunziata, Campania that currently plays in Serie D
- 6th Mechanized Infantry Regiment “Saboya”, a mechanized infantry unit in the Spanish Army

== Surname ==
- Gigi Savoia (born 1954), Italian actor
- Gustavo Savoia (born 1981), Argentine footballer
- Michele Savoia, Italian rower
- Ryan Savoia (born 1973), Canadian ice hockey player
- Sara Savoia (born 1985), Italian synchronized swimmer
- Stephan Savoia, American photographer
