= Dobročovice =

- Municipality
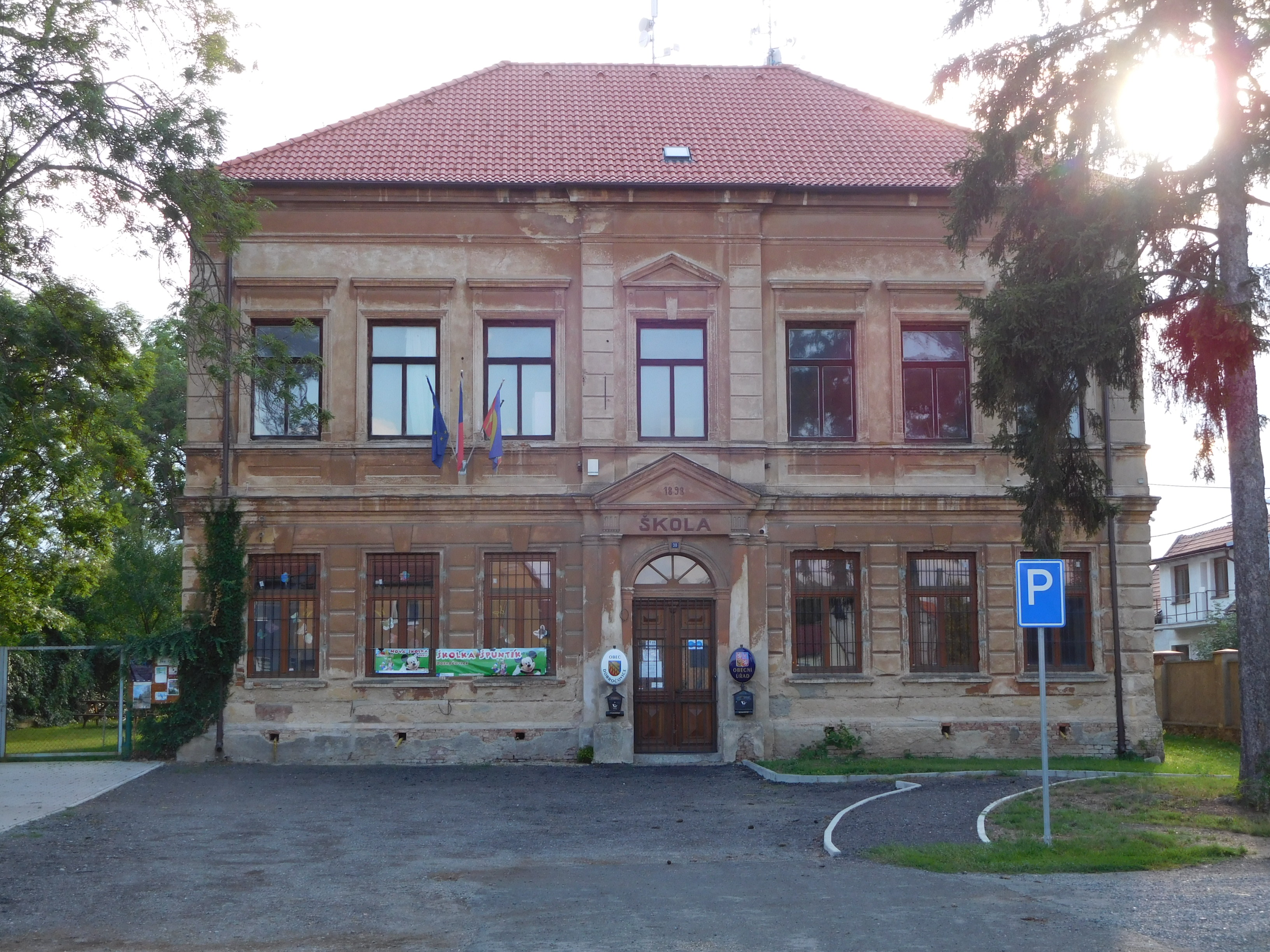
- Municipal office

- Flag Coat of arms

- Location in the Czech Republic
- Coordinates: 50°3′23″N 14°42′0″E
- Country: Czech Republic
- Region: Central Bohemian
- District: Prague-East
- First mentioned: 1394

Area
  - Total: 3.57 km^{2} (1.38 sq mi)
- Elevation: 273 m (896 ft)

Population (2026-01-01)
  - Total: 327
  - Density: 91.6/km^{2} (237/sq mi)
- Time zone: UTC+1 (CET)
  - Summer (DST): UTC+2 (CEST)
- Postal code: 250 82
- Website: dobrocovice.cz

Dobročovice is a municipality and village in Prague-East District in the Central Bohemian Region of the Czech Republic. It has about 300 inhabitants.

== History ==
The first written mention of Dobročovice is from 1394.

== Demographics ==
Historical population
Year	Pop.	±%
1869	297	—
1880	290	−2.4%
1890	274	−5.5%
1900	305	+11.3%
1910	322	+5.6%
1921	311	−3.4%
1930	318	+2.3%
1950	221	−30.5%
1961	254	+14.9%
1970	193	−24.0%
1980	128	−33.7%
1991	118	−7.8%
2001	123	+4.2%
2011	253	+105.7%
2021	328	+29.6%
Source: Censuses
