= Škvorec =

- Market town
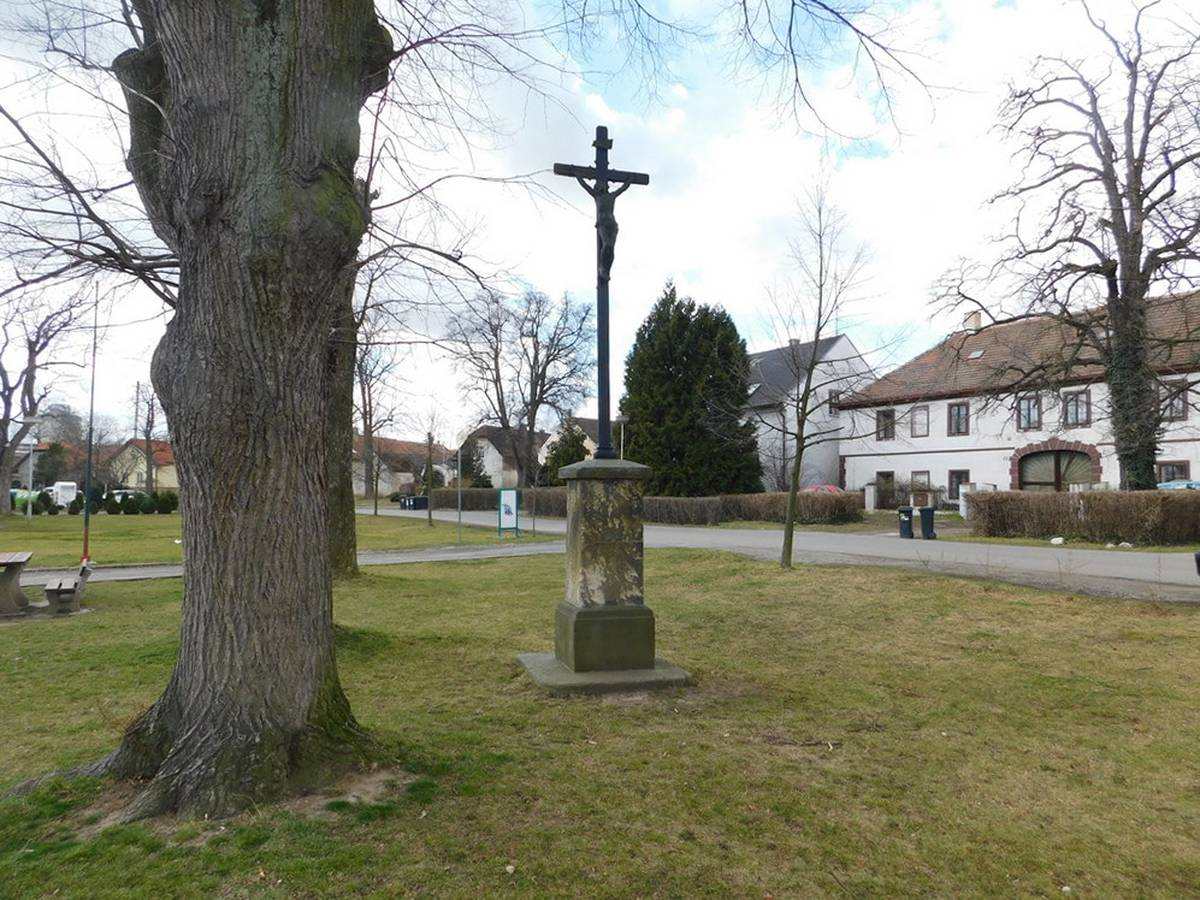
- Main square

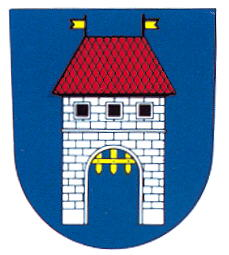
- Flag Coat of arms

- Location in the Czech Republic
- Coordinates: 50°2′49″N 14°43′50″E
- Country: Czech Republic
- Region: Central Bohemian
- District: Prague-East
- First mentioned: 1279

Area
  - Total: 12.76 km^{2} (4.93 sq mi)
- Elevation: 305 m (1,001 ft)

Population (2026-01-01)
  - Total: 2,269
  - Density: 177.8/km^{2} (460.6/sq mi)
- Time zone: UTC+1 (CET)
  - Summer (DST): UTC+2 (CEST)
- Postal code: 250 83
- Website: www.obecskvorec.cz

Škvorec (Czech pronunciation: [ˈʃkvorɛts]) is a market town in Prague-East District in the Central Bohemian Region of the Czech Republic. It has about 2,300 inhabitants.

== Administrative division ==
Škvorec consists of two municipal parts (in brackets population according to the 2021 census):

- Škvorec (1,858)
- Třebohostice (309)

== Etymology ==
The name was probably derived from the surname Škvor or Škvorec. The word škvor means 'earwig' in Czech, but the surname could be also derived from škorec, meaning 'starling' in Old Czech.

== Geography ==
Škvorec is located about 15 kilometres (9 mi) east of Prague. It lies on the border between the Prague Plateau and Benešov Uplands. The highest point is the hill Na Plachtě at 391 m (1,283 ft) above sea level.

== History ==
The first written mention of Škvorec is from 1279. In 1497, during the rule of Jan Škvorecký of Klinštejn, Škvorec was promoted to a market town by King Vladislaus II. The market town was acquired by Albrecht von Wallenstein in 1621, but he sold it to Karl I of Liechtenstein a year later. Karl I joined it to the Kostelec estate. Škvorec was owned by the Liechtenstein family until the establishment of an independent municipality in 1848.

== Demographics ==
Historical population

| Year | Pop. | ±% |
|---|---|---|
| 1869 | 1,219 | — |
| 1880 | 1,270 | +4.2% |
| 1890 | 1,256 | −1.1% |
| 1900 | 1,208 | −3.8% |
| 1910 | 1,351 | +11.8% |

| Year | Pop. | ±% |
|---|---|---|
| 1921 | 1,269 | −6.1% |
| 1930 | 1,311 | +3.3% |
| 1950 | 1,089 | −16.9% |
| 1961 | 1,101 | +1.1% |
| 1970 | 1,068 | −3.0% |

| Year | Pop. | ±% |
|---|---|---|
| 1980 | 1,006 | −5.8% |
| 1991 | 875 | −13.0% |
| 2001 | 916 | +4.7% |
| 2011 | 1,578 | +72.3% |
| 2021 | 2,167 | +37.3% |

Source: Censuses

== Transport ==
There are no railways or major roads passing through the municipal territory.

== Sights ==
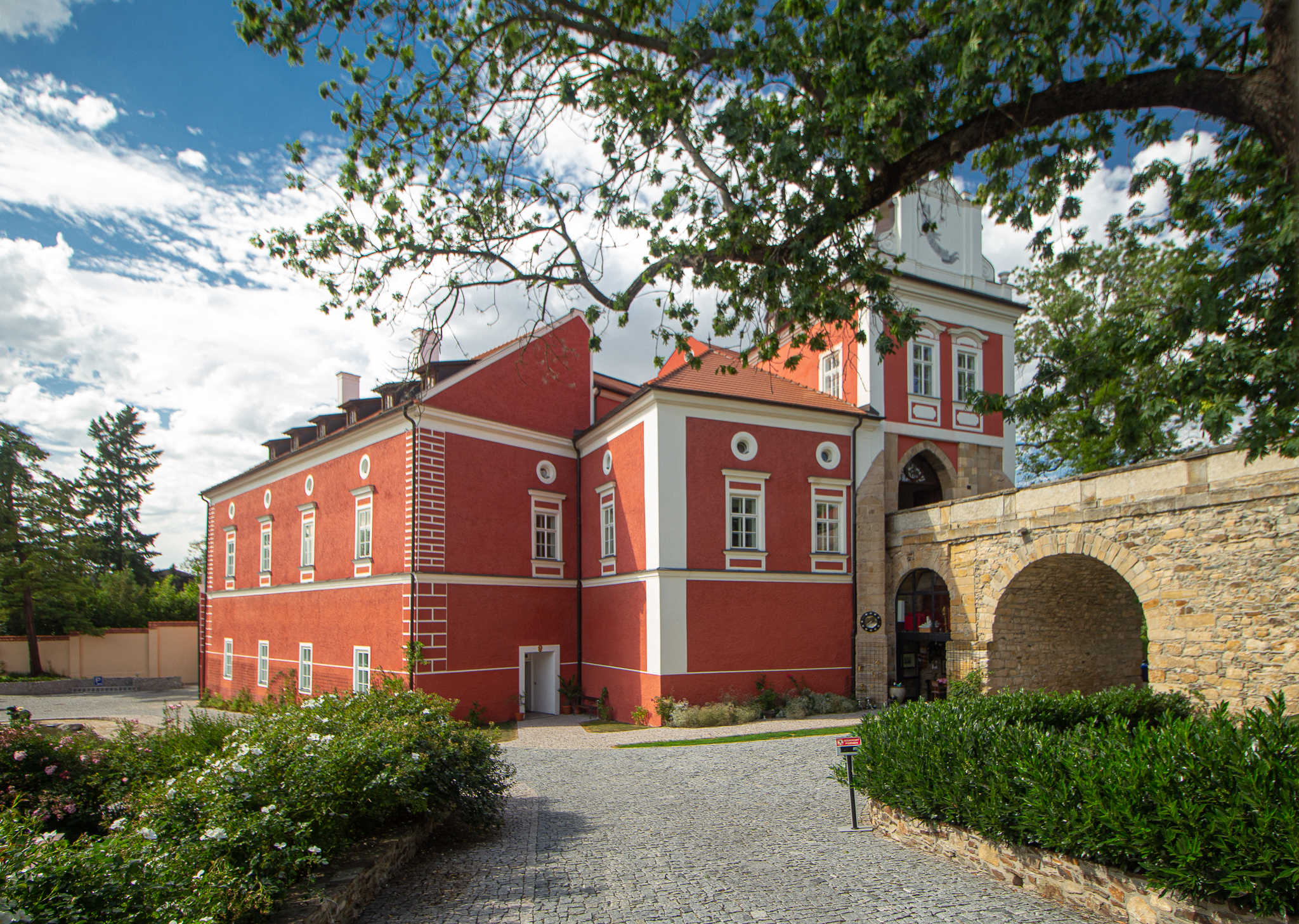
Škvorec Castle

The main landmark of Škvorec is the Škvorec Castle, also known as Savoia Castle. Today it is privately owned and used as a hotel and restaurant.

The Church of Saint Anne is a valuable late Baroque building. It was built in 1759–1767 on the site of an older, demolished church.
