= Škvorec Chateau =

Chateau in the Central Bohemian Region of the Czech Republic

Coordinates: 50°2′45″N 14°44′1″E

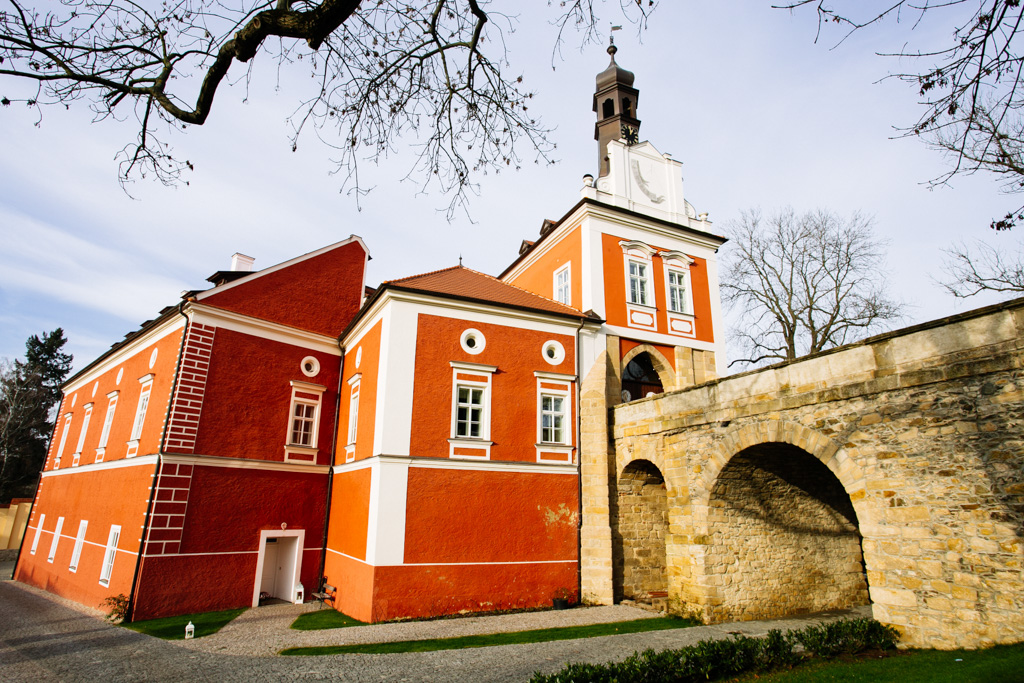
Škvorec Chateau ("Savoia Castle") in December 2016

Škvorec Chateau (Czech: zámek Škvorec; German: Schloss Squorz or Schkworetz) is a chateau, formerly a minor castle, located in Škvorec in the Central Bohemian Region of the Czech Republic, about 23 kilometres (14 mi) east of Prague. The chateau, locally also known as the Starý zámek ("Old Chateau"), was indirectly first mentioned in historical sources in 1279, yet fully documented as late as since 1404. This Gothic castle was rebuilt during the 1520s into a Renaissance palace; but in 1639 – during the devastating Thirty Years' War – the premises were looted, burned and until 1710 laid in ruins. The chateau was restored then, this time in the Baroque style. Between 1860 and 1884 most of the compound was demolished (also due to the construction of local municipal school), leaving only the buildings in south-eastern corner.

In 2008, the almost ruined remnants of the chateau were bought by a family of Russian-Italian immigrants which have gradually restored it and now promote a new name: the Savoia Castle (as an allusion of a noble family to which one of previous owners married – see below). New owners made the chateau partially accessible to the public in May 2016, since then there have been various cultural and commercial events here.

== History ==
=== Middle ages ===
The founder, and maybe the builder too, was probably local noble Domaslav (Latin: Domaslaus de Squorz) around 1279, an important courtier and country official, the butler (1262) of Queen Kunigunda of Slavonia and her food taster (1263–69, 1279), Lord High Treasurer (1267–78) and one of the ten burgraves (Czech: pukrabí) of the Prague Castle. From the castle he built, only the deep well is now preserved, cut in the granite rock, which was situated near to the Early Gothic palace (on the site of present school building). The coat-of-arms of Domaslav of Škvorec, three vertical stripes, which cannot be found anywhere in central Bohemia later, proving that the castle must have passed to another noble family not long after. The names of the owners until after 1450 aren't known.

In the second half of 14th century, the castle was owned by the Olbramovicové ("Wolfram's family"), rich merchant clan of German origin from Prague. One of them, Olbram son of Menhart (died around 1388), installed the priest of the church in Horky, which already belonged to Škvorec by 1354. Olbram, son of Menhart was since 1356 the Reeve of Prague New Town and in 1373–80 the Burgrave of Vyšehrad. In connection with Škvorec he is mentioned only two times: first as Olbram of Škvorec (in Skworzecz) in the records of visitation of the Prague archdeacon Pavel of Janovice from 1380, and secondly as Olbram, son of Menhart of Škvorec (de Skworecz), in a charter from 1385.

After his death, his three sons Olbram, Pavel and Václav became the owners of Škvorec. The most important of them was Olbram: since 1379/82 he became the canon of the Metropolitan (St. Vitus') and Vyšehrad Chapters, between 1389 and 1396 was the provost at St. Apollinaire in Prague New Town, also the chancellor of the king's Wenceslaus IV brother John of Görlitz and finally, on 31 January 1396, he was appointed the fourth Archbishop of Prague. His brother Pavel was a burgrave in town Týn nad Vltavou (1397), and Wenceslaus earned 500 marks of silver in the king's service in 1396. These successes of the three brothers had an influence on their building activity at Škvorec, because its Early Gothic castle did not conform to the needs of noblemen at the end of 14th century. According to modern archaeological, historical and construction research made by architect Jan Žižka, it appears that around 1400 the Olbram's family essentially enlarged the area of the castle and added to the buildings. Opposite the old Early Gothic palace they built an oblong tower with a pointed-arched gate and with a small wicket, together with drawbridges across the newly dug water-filled moat. Above it, east of the entrance tower, they built another Gothic palace with a chapel, whose chaplain called Václav is noted in judgment roll of the Archbishopric of Prague in 1404. Due to the building of the new palace, Škvorec thus had two palaces, as was faithfully recorded in the fideicommissum charters in 1654.

The archbishop with his two brothers owned Škvorec Castle until 2 May 1402 when he died. His two surviving brothers then divided the property amongst themselves. Next, Jan Nichilen of Prague bought the Wenceslaus's share (the rent from Škvorec Castle, half of the farmyard and some villages) in 1411, and before 1418 the owner of it was Jan of Klučov. The second half of property was still owned by Pavel of Škvorec until his death (after 1418).

His widow Eliška married before 1422 Jan Ohništko of Ohnišťany, who appropriated the second half of the property too. But in 1426 he violated the parliamentary peace, when he killed his ex-neighbor Prokop Trčka of Květnice in a duel in Prague. As a result, he was brought to court and then executed. Eliška became a widow again and very soon she had big debts. Because of them, she had to sell the rent from Škvorec, Hostyň and the half of the market-town of Úvaly to Prokop Bervík of Malešice in the same year. But he sold it only a short time after to Vilém of Kounice, from whom it was bought by Petřík Olbrámovic (shortly called Olbrámek), and thanks to this the whole property was again owned by the Olbramovicové family of Prague.

=== Early modern history ===
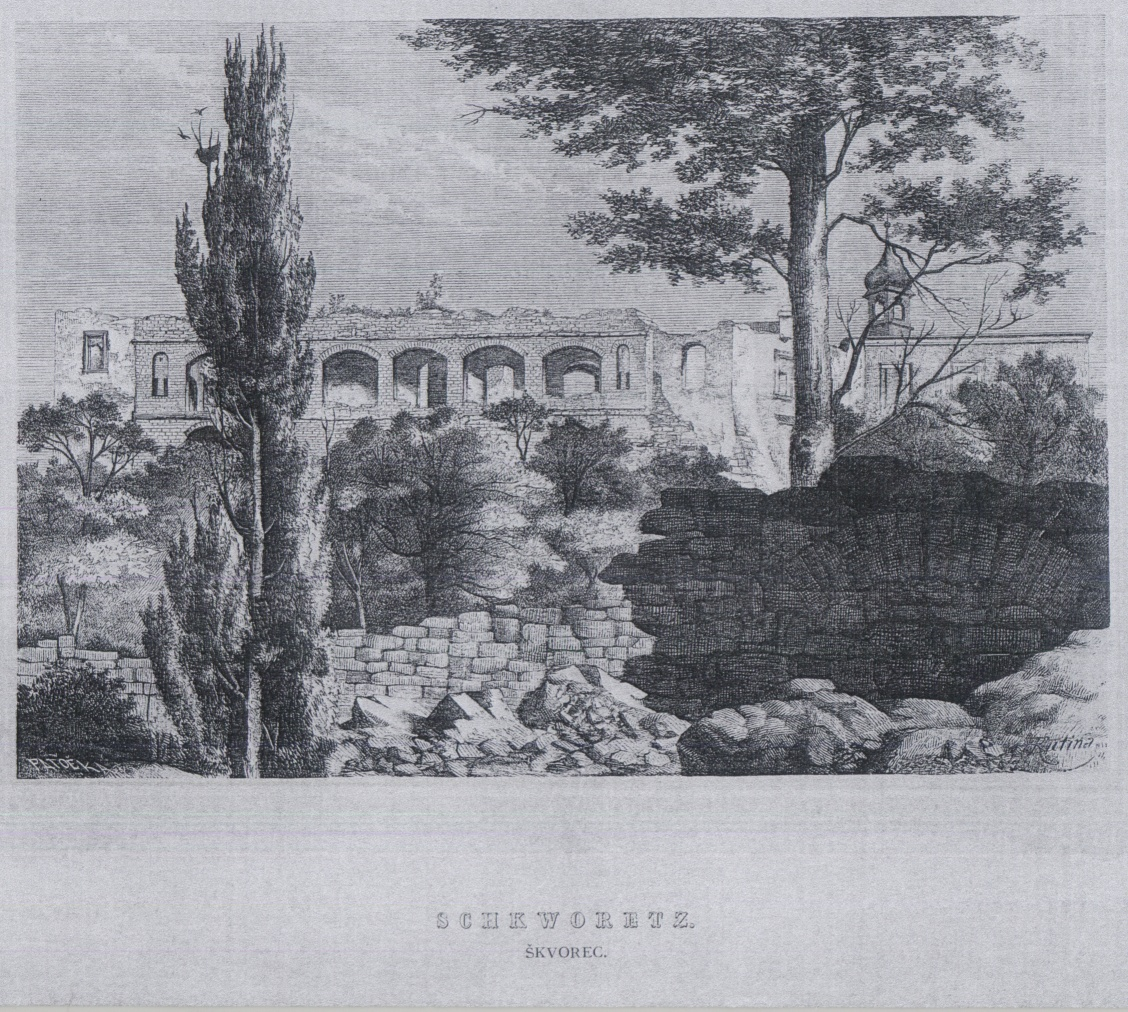
Renaissance palace of Škvorec as of 1881, shortly before demolition (still preserved part of the chateau is visible on the right side, under the turret)

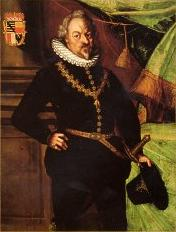
Prince Karl I of Liechtenstein (his family owned Škvorec between 1622 and 1924)

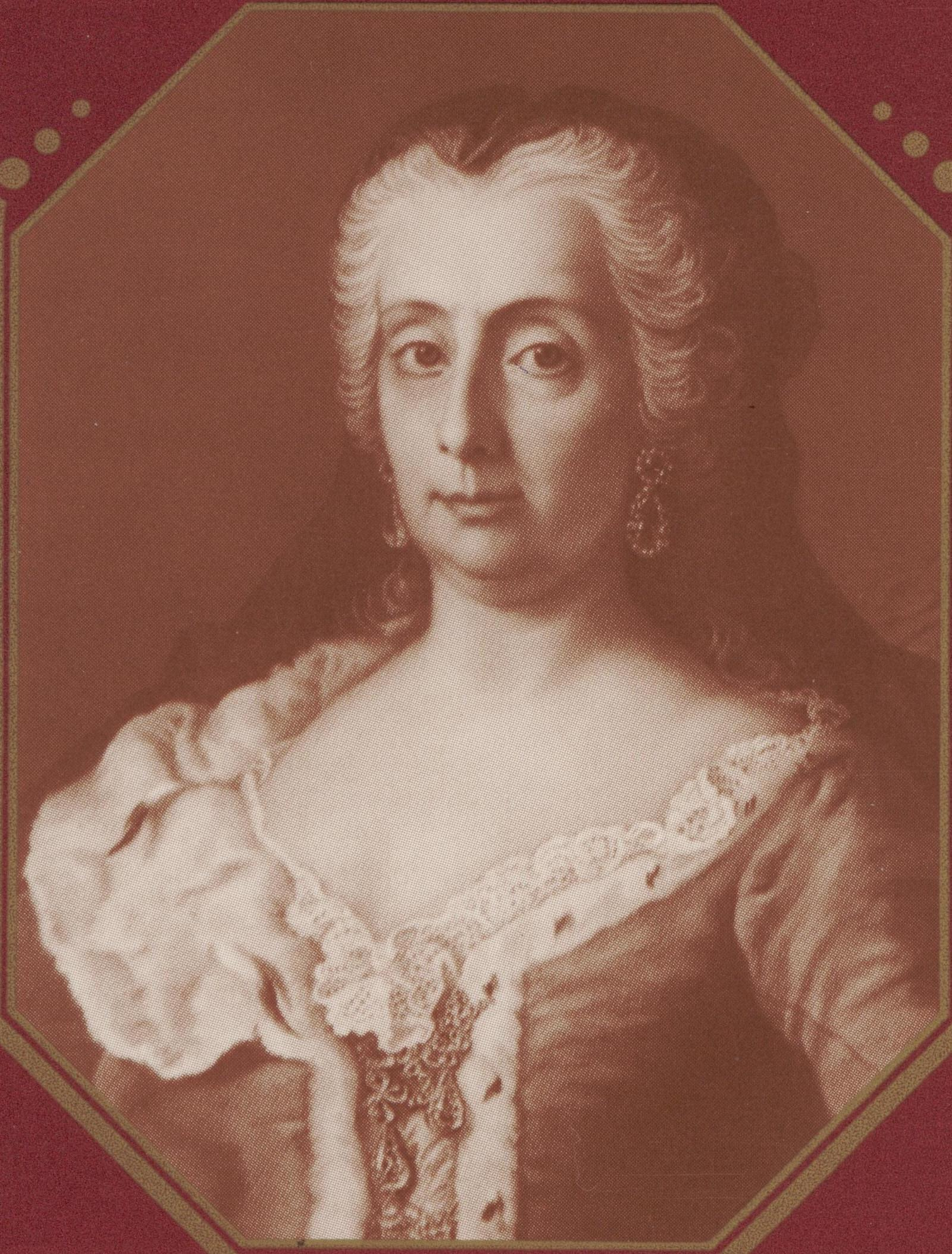
Countess Maria Theresia of Soissons (née Liechtenstein) rebuilt the burned castle into Baroque chateau

The next important owner of Škvorec castle was Čeněk of Klinštejn, the Crown Prosecutor, who bought it from the Olbramovic family in 1462. He was a significant person in the Crown of Bohemia of that time. He was not only the Crown Prosecutor, but also a Burgrave of Prague Castle (1451–61) and of Vyšehrad (1467–79) and in the years 1457–81 he was the Queen's Prosecutor. In the time of his son Jan, King Vladislaus II raised Škvorec into a market town (1497). After his death round 1509, his brother Zdeněk inherited the castle. He had many lawsuits with his neighbours, townsmen and also with his nearest relatives, as did his son Jindřich, who died in the battles against the Turks in Hungary. After that, the castle passed to brother of Jindřich's mother: Lord Zikmund Smiřický of Smiřice. In about 1545 he started reconstructing the old castle and modernised it into a Renaissance residence. During this reconstruction he probably built the western range with arcades and the building on the eastern side of the courtyard.

During the inheritance procedure after his death, his sons divided the large family property so that Jaroslav became the owner of Škvorec, Albrecht received Náchod and Miletín and Jindřich got Hrubá Skála and Hořice. But not much earlier than 1560, Albrecht is also mentioned as the owner of Škvorec. His son Václav Jaroslav spent a long time in Škvorec, where he died in 1593. His son, Albrecht Václav, died in 1614 and the castle was inherited by his uncle, Albrecht Jan.

As the fideicommissum records from 1618 tell, Albrecht Jan Smiřický of Smiřice had a vaulted hall known as "the stone hall", lord's apartment and also an armoury built in the castle. In other parts of the castle there were offices and rooms of the members of his estate government and on the ground floor there was some economic establishment. During the confiscation of his property in 1621 (it was a part of larger confiscations that hit most of the Protestant nobility and burghers of Bohemia and Moravia as a punishment for the failed anti-Habsburg Bohemian Revolt), Škvorec Castle fell into the hands of general Albrecht von Wallenstein because his mother was from the Smiřický family. Nevertheless, he sold it almost immediately to Prince Karl I of Liechtenstein in 1622.

The preserved records of the hejtman of Černý Kostelec Manor, Captain Přech Svatkovský of Dobrohošť, shows that the Swedes plundered the castle and set it on fire on 27 November 1639. During the fire the ceilings in some rooms in both palaces collapsed (in one of them – in the upper palace – was the jail for the retainers in that time). The repair works appear to have been minimal: until 1654 only the upper palace was covered by a temporary thatched roof and no more reconstruction then continued. So for the rest of 17th century the castle was known as a ruin.

From the records of the Uhříněves manor (to which Škvorec belonged at that time) it is known that the first part of the castle was repaired by Italian builder Kristian Minedi in 1710, when he submitted accounts for repairing six rooms to the Estate government; major repairs were carried out subsequently in 1727. This northern parts of the castle became since 1729 a seat of Princess Maria Theresa of Soissons (a cadet branch of the House of Savoy-Carignano), née Liechtenstein. This princess-countess, popular with her subjects – who familiarly nicknamed her Cafojka ("Savoyarde") – for her kind behavior and philanthropy, essentially gave the chateau its final appearance which has been partially preserved to this day. After the death of the Countess (1772), the chateau was no longer used as a mansion, but it fell to the mere seat of the economic administration of the estate, gradually dilapidated, while its parts were redesigned to flats for clerks and servants.

=== Modern era ===
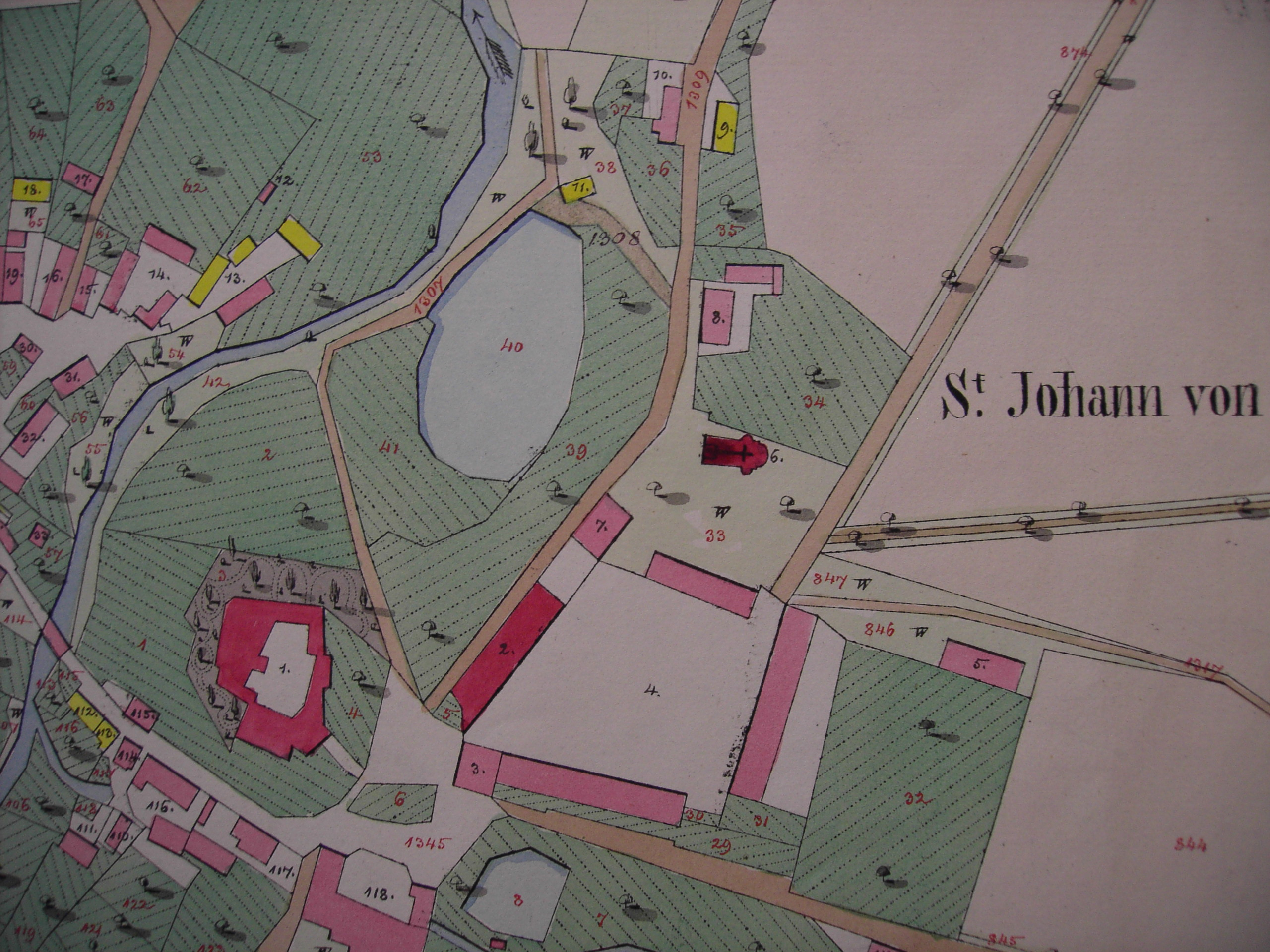
Škvorec compound on cadastral map (Stable Cadastre) from 1843

Škvorec Chateau was still habitable in 1794, but in the years that followed it rapidly decayed. Instead of reconstruction, most of buildings were largely dismantled between 1860 and 1884. The dilapidated north-western palace was demolished first, then the western two-storied wing was taken down in 1883. On the site of ruin of the old Gothic-Renaissance palace, local school was built in 1890. Of the whole castle only the rebuilt Baroque south-eastern part with the gatehouse tower was left (perhaps because the southern wing of the chateau was adapted from the late 1850s to a synagogue for local Jews, and also there, until 1939, an yeshiva was housed), together with old dug well in the courtyard.

In 1924 the chateau was expropriated by the Czechoslovak state in the framework of the 1st land reform and transferred to the ownership of the municipality, which used the buildings in the following decades partially as flats and partially for needs of the local school. In 1958 the remnants of the old chateau were declared a cultural monument. During general repair in 1964 the building got its present architectural forms.

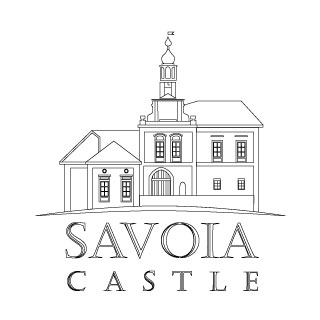
Official logo of the Savoia Castle

In 1994, the building was bought by a private owner, who didn't start promised reconstruction, so during the following 10 years of decaying the roof, rafters and floors were gradually collapsed, and there were many irreversible damages of the original constructions. In 2004 English filmmaker Stephen Weeks, owner of company Monumental Trust Bohemia Co., bought the chateau for repair and subsequent commercial use but the project was never launched. However, further unprofessional building interventions led to a desperate condition, so after 22 years of private "care" the chateau was considered irreparable (since 2001 it was listed on the List of Endangered Immovable Monuments of the Czech Republic) and was destined for demolition. The rescue for the chateau came at the beginning of 2008, when it was bought for about 8 million CZK by Russian-Italian noble couple Dmitri Eremeev and Monica Salvatore-Eremeev (with Czech roots), who started a general reconstruction exclusively from their own funds, according to the project of Czech architect Olga Kantová. In the next 8 years, the whole area (together with the surrounding park) has been carefully reconstructed under the supervision of preservationists and in cooperation with the municipal office; the family subsequently made its new seat partly accessible to the public for concerts, lectures, exhibitions, weddings, etc.

In addition, archaeological research in the courtyard between the chateau and the school building took place in the years of 2009–10, which revealed until then unknown details about previous Early Gothic castle buildings: for example, the foundations of a massive circular bergfried with a diameter of 12 meters and wall thickness of 4 meters were excavated.

== Architecture ==
The building (or, rather, its preserved part), standing on a small rocky hillock, has a ground plan in the shape of a broken letter "U", with sides about 26-17-13 meters long, with the longest wing forming the southern side. All wings of the building are two-storeyed; in the southeast corner there is a gate, above which a small turret towers. To the gate leads a stone bridge (with two arches) over the former castle moat.
