= Sibřina =

- Municipality
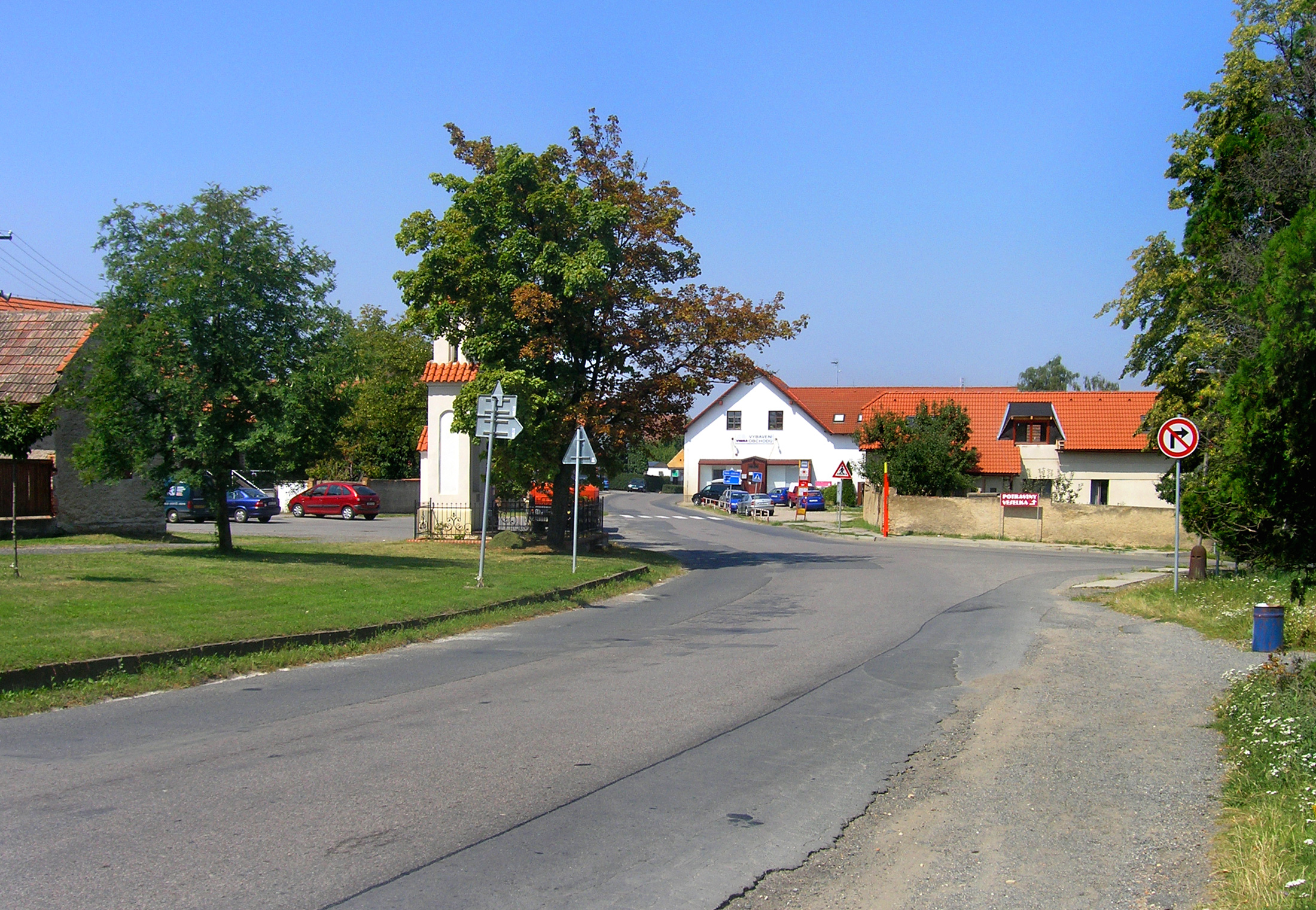
- Centre of Sibřina

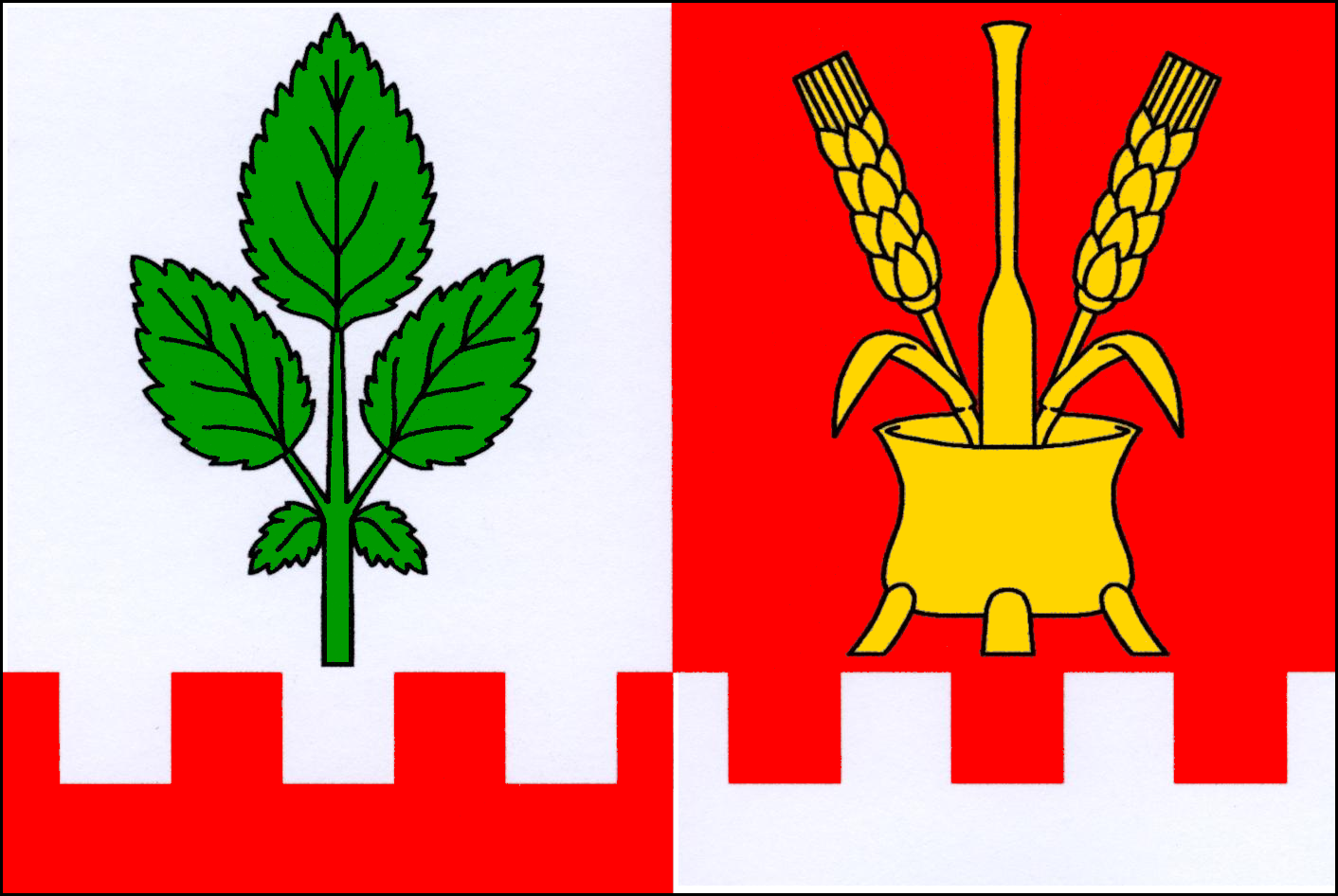
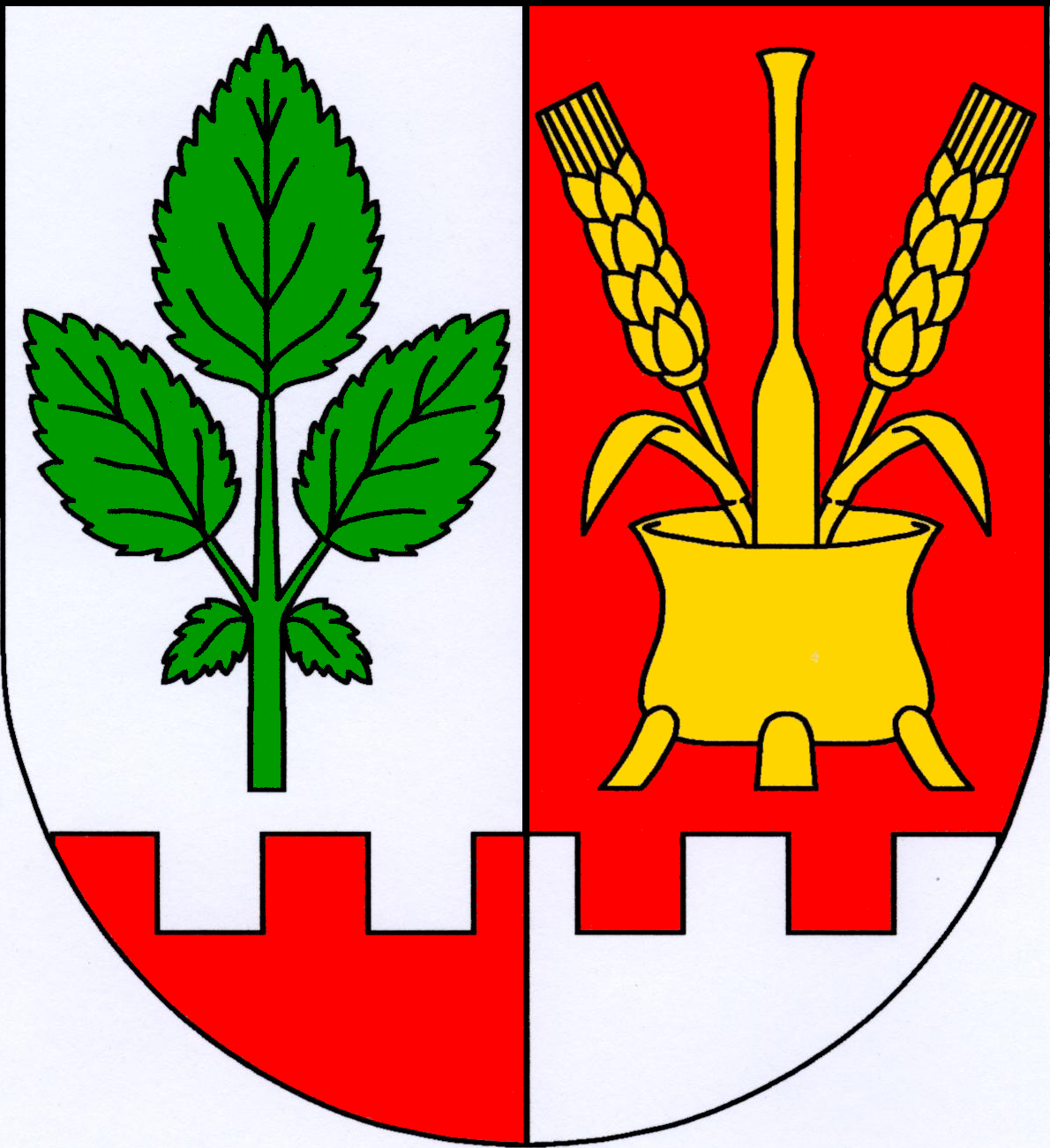
- Flag Coat of arms

- Location in the Czech Republic
- Coordinates: 50°3′24″N 14°40′10″E
- Country: Czech Republic
- Region: Central Bohemian
- District: Prague-East
- First mentioned: 1197

Area
  - Total: 4.44 km^{2} (1.71 sq mi)
- Elevation: 277 m (909 ft)

Population (2026-01-01)
  - Total: 1,089
  - Density: 245/km^{2} (635/sq mi)
- Time zone: UTC+1 (CET)
  - Summer (DST): UTC+2 (CEST)
- Postal code: 250 84
- Website: www.sibrina.cz

Sibřina is a municipality and village in Prague-East District in the Central Bohemian Region of the Czech Republic. It has about 1,100 inhabitants.

Sibřina lies on eastern border of Prague, approximately 18 kilometres (11 mi) east of its centre.

== Administrative division ==
Sibřina consists of two municipal parts (in brackets population according to the 2021 census):

- Sibřina (850)
- Stupice (230)

== Demographics ==
Historical population
Year	Pop.	±%
1869	551	—
1880	543	−1.5%
1890	556	+2.4%
1900	592	+6.5%
1910	590	−0.3%
1921	589	−0.2%
1930	636	+8.0%
1950	393	−38.2%
1961	578	+47.1%
1970	547	−5.4%
1980	477	−12.8%
1991	455	−4.6%
2001	473	+4.0%
2011	711	+50.3%
2021	1,080	+51.9%
Source: Censuses
