= Polerady =

Polerady may refer to places in the Czech Republic:

- Polerady (Most District), a municipality and village in the Ústí nad Labem Region
- Polerady (Prague-East District), a municipality and village in the Central Bohemian Region
