= Polerady (Prague-East District) =

- Municipality
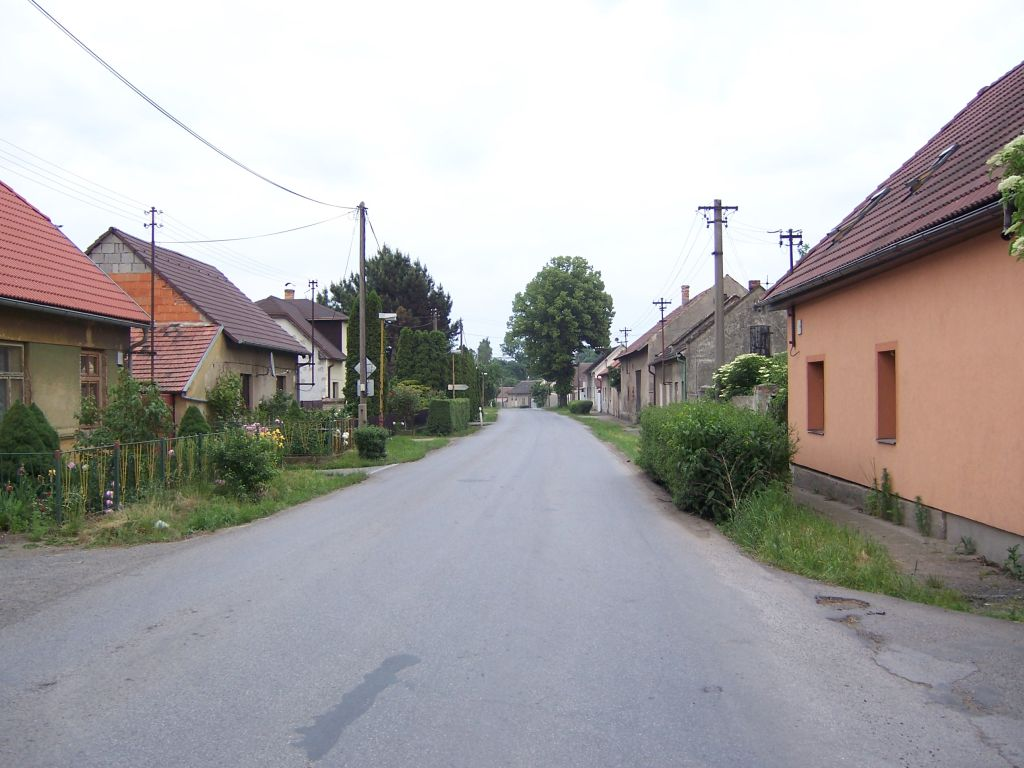
- Main street

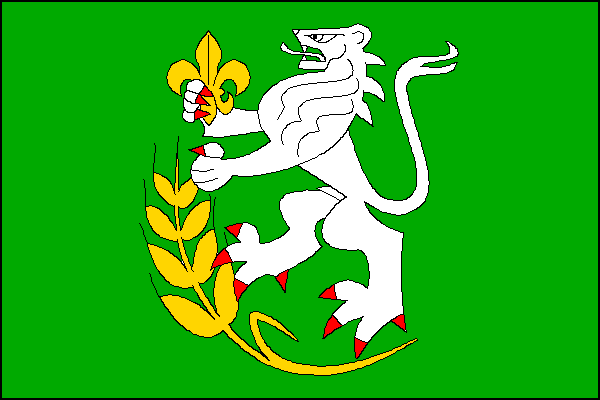
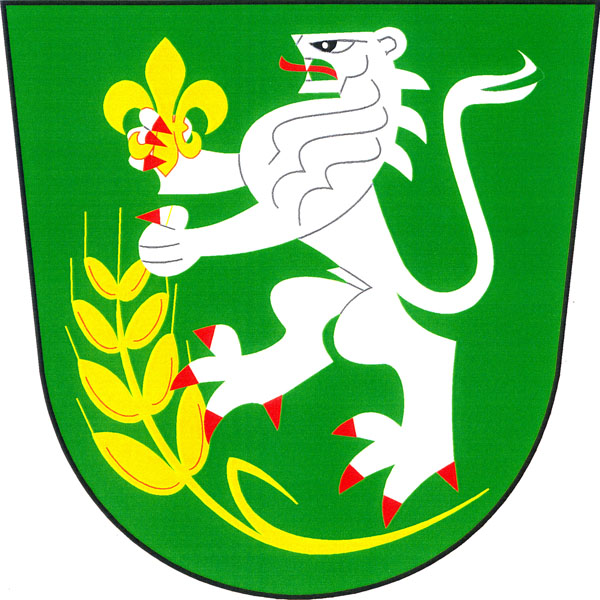
- Flag Coat of arms

- Location in the Czech Republic
- Coordinates: 50°12′2″N 14°35′36″E
- Country: Czech Republic
- Region: Central Bohemian
- District: Prague-East
- First mentioned: 1290

Area
  - Total: 3.86 km^{2} (1.49 sq mi)
- Elevation: 182 m (597 ft)

Population (2026-01-01)
  - Total: 876
  - Density: 227/km^{2} (588/sq mi)
- Time zone: UTC+1 (CET)
  - Summer (DST): UTC+2 (CEST)
- Postal code: 250 63
- Website: www.obecpolerady.cz

Polerady is a municipality and village in Prague-East District in the Central Bohemian Region of the Czech Republic. It has about 900 inhabitants.

== History ==
The first written mention of Polerady is from 1290.

== Demographics ==
Historical population
Year	Pop.	±%
1869	230	—
1880	260	+13.0%
1890	265	+1.9%
1900	293	+10.6%
1910	291	−0.7%
1921	328	+12.7%
1930	348	+6.1%
1950	206	−40.8%
1961	250	+21.4%
1970	237	−5.2%
1980	264	+11.4%
1991	213	−19.3%
2001	229	+7.5%
2011	233	+1.7%
2021	472	+102.6%
Source: Censuses
