= Karel Otčenášek =

Czech Roman Catholic bishop

- Archbishop-Bishop Emeritus of Diocese of Hradec Králové
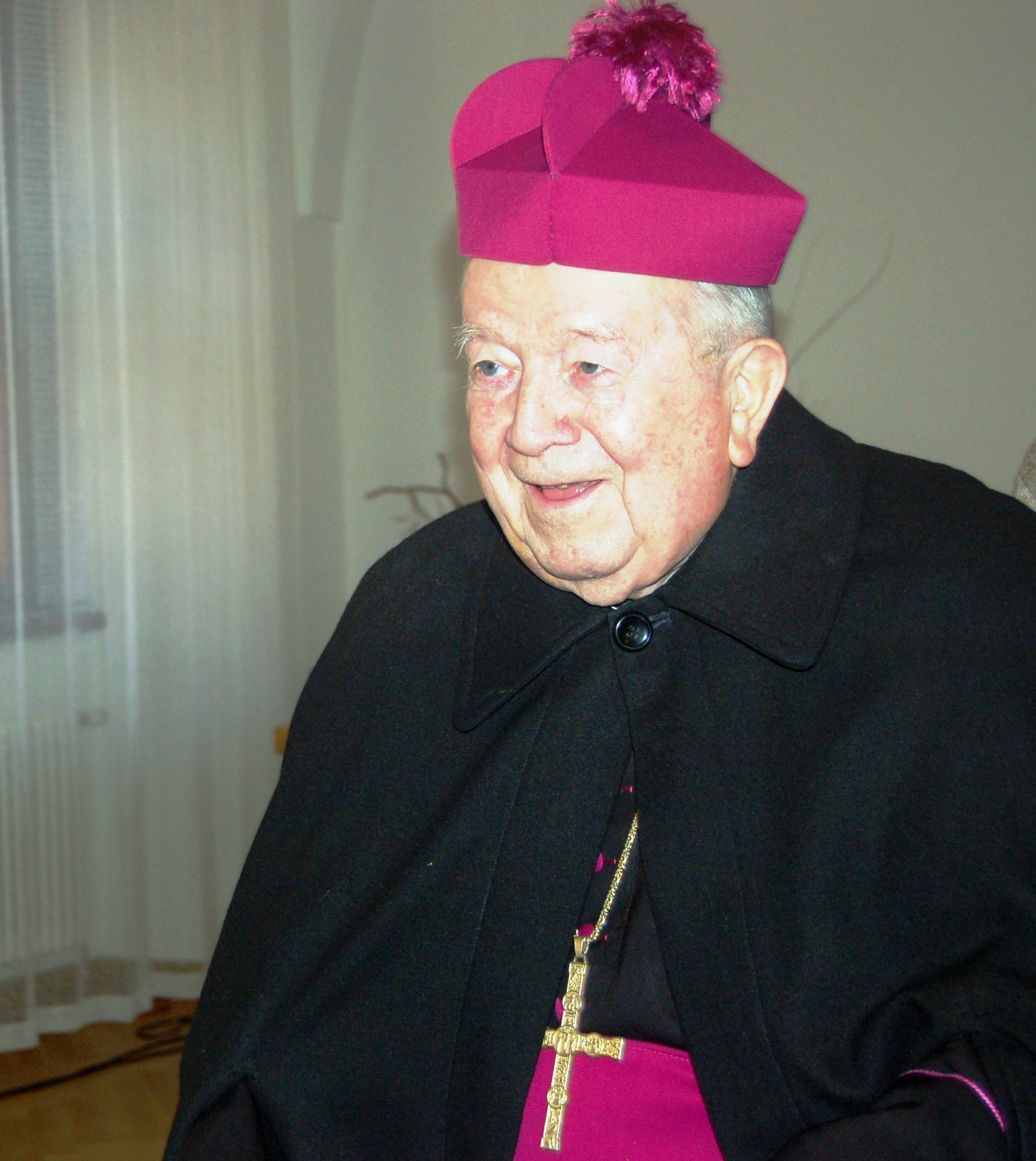
- Karel Otčenášek in 2007
- Church: Roman Catholic Church
- See: Diocese of Hradec Králové
- In office: 1989–1998
- Predecessor: Mořic Pícha
- Successor: Dominik Duka

Orders
- Ordination: 17 March 1945
- Consecration: 30 April 1950

Personal details
- Born: 13 April 1920 České Meziříčí
- Died: 23 May 2011 (aged 91) Hradec Králové

Karel Otčenášek (13 April 1920 – 23 May 2011) was a Czech prelate of the Roman Catholic Church.

== Early life ==
Otčenášek was born in České Meziříčí and was ordained a priest on 17 March 1945.

== Career ==
He became Apostolic Administrator of the Diocese of Hradec Králové on 30 March 1950 and was consecrated bishop on 30 April 1950. From 1951 to 1962, he was imprisoned for having been consecrated without the consent of the government which was legally required during the communist rule of the Czechoslovakia. Otcenášek was appointed bishop of the same diocese (Hradec Králové) on 21 December 1989, where he served until his retirement on 6 June 1998.

He was promoted to Archbishop ad personam by John Paul II on 24 September 1998.
