= John Plummer =

English composer

John Plummer (also Plomer, Plourmel, Plumere, Polmier, Polumier; c. 1410 – c. 1483) was an English composer who flourished during the reign of Henry VI of England.

Not many of Plummer's compositions survive. The motets Anna mater matris Christi (Anne, mother of the mother of Christ) and Tota Pulchra Es (My Love is Wholly Beautiful) are widely available and recorded. A number of Plummer's compositions appear in the manuscript Brussels Biliothèque Royale MS 5557. During his own lifetime, knowledge and performance of his works spread at least as far as the present-day Czech Republic, where pieces such as Tota Pulchra Es were copied into the Codex Speciálník (c. 1500). These pieces are unaccompanied sacred vocal music written for use in the great royal and noble chapels of northern Europe.

Plummer was a member of the English Chapel Royal at least from 1438, and was also apparently the first to hold the office of Master of the Children of the Chapel Royal from 1444 to 1455. He left the royal household towards the end of his career and moved to St George's Chapel, Windsor, where he held the post of verger, which at the time implied greater responsibility than in more recent times. This post is likely to have supported him in his declining years.
