= Cathedral of the Holy Spirit, Hradec Králové =

Cathedral of the Holy Spirit
- Katedrála svatého Ducha
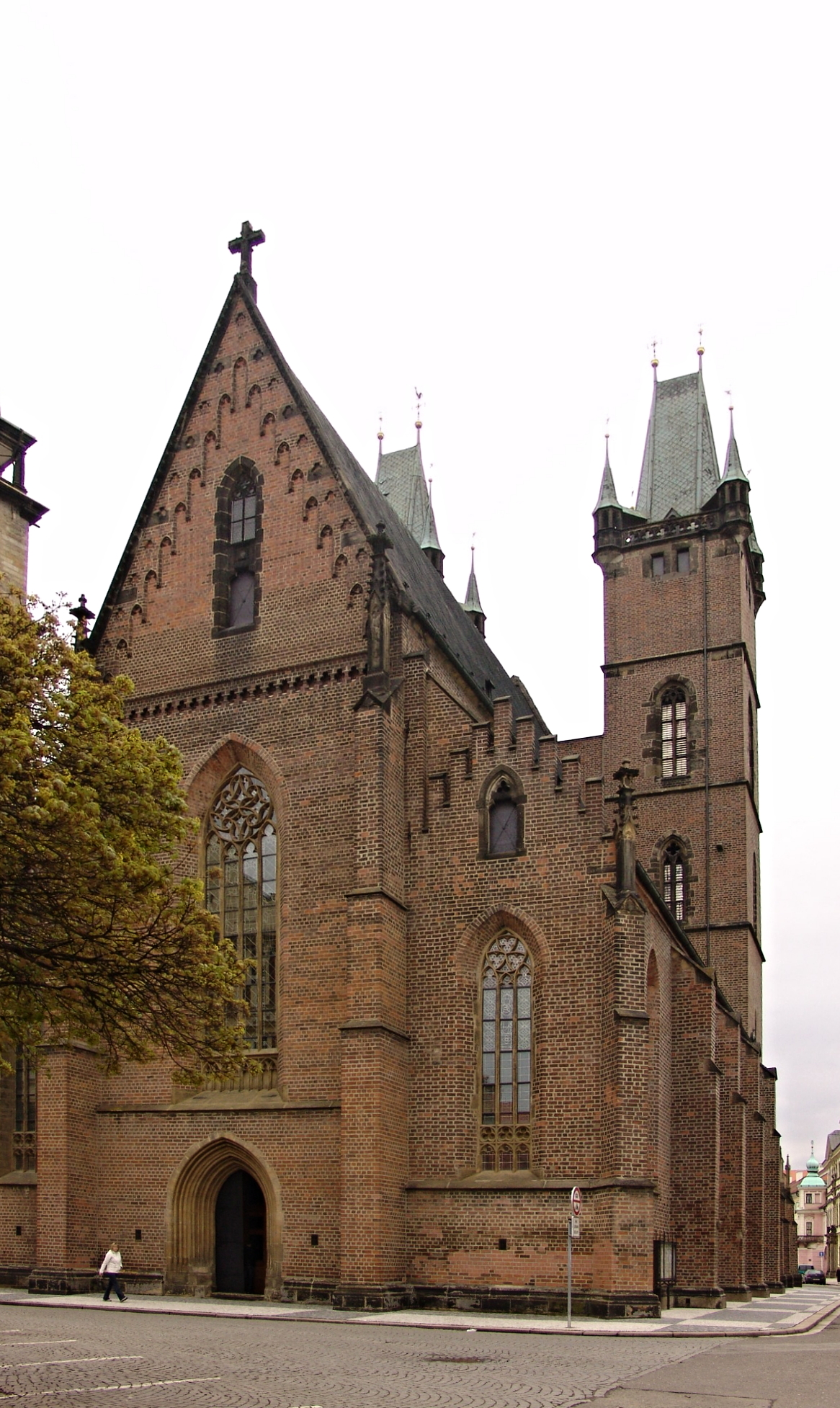

- Location in the Czech Republic
- 50°12′32″N 15°49′51″E
- Location: Hradec Králové
- Country: Czech Republic
- Denomination: Roman Catholic
- Website: www.dekanstvihk.cz

History
- Status: Active
- Founded: 1307
- Founder: Elizabeth Richeza of Poland
- Dedication: Holy Spirit

Architecture
- Functional status: Cathedral and Parish church
- Style: Gothic
- Completed: 1463

Administration
- Diocese: Hradec Králové

Clergy
- Bishop: Jan Vokál

Recording of the Cathedral's bells from 1933

The Cathedral of the Holy Spirit (Czech: Katedrála svatého Ducha) is a principal church of the Diocese of Hradec Králové in the Czech Republic and the seat of the current bishop of the Diocese Jan Vokál. It is a late Gothic brick basilica with two towers located in the southwestern corner of the Velké Square in Hradec Králové.

== History ==
The founding charter of the construction of the church was not preserved, so there is speculation around when the construction of the church began. The history of the cathedral is traditionally described as initiated by Elizabeth Richeza of Poland, wife of King Wenceslaus II and later King Rudolf I in 1307. Elizabeth received dowry towns including Hradec Králové after Rudolf's death in 1307. Elizabeth chose Hradec Králové as her residence town between 1308 and 1318. And for this reason the beginning of the church is connected with her name.

=== 10th to 13th century ===
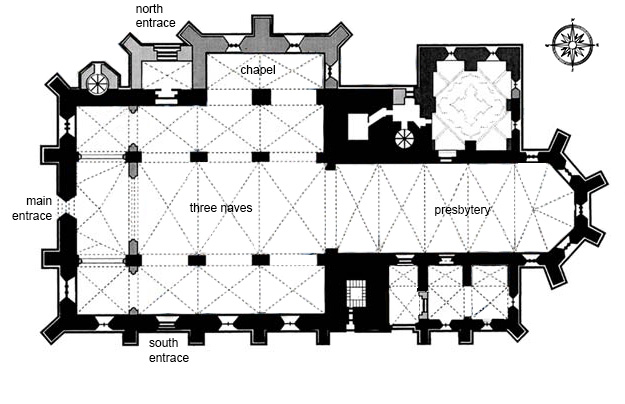
Plan

The historical centre of the city was recognized as Slavonic settlement in the 10th century, which was rebuilt into a royal castle. Before the year 1225 the settlement turned into a full-fledged medieval town. The first parish church of this city was St. Clement's Church, which stood on the site of today's baroque chapel of St. Clement. The first indirect mention of the Holy Spirit Cathedral dates back to 1238 when Teutonic Knights settled outside of the city walls. They had decided to build their own parish church between 1238 and 1250, it was built on the place of today's Holy Spirit Cathedral. However, its appearance is not known. There is no mention of building plans or description of this church. The city suffered extensive fire in 1339, that burned the town to the ground, including the parish church of the Teutonic Knights. The construction of the new church became essential.

=== The beginning of the 14th century ===
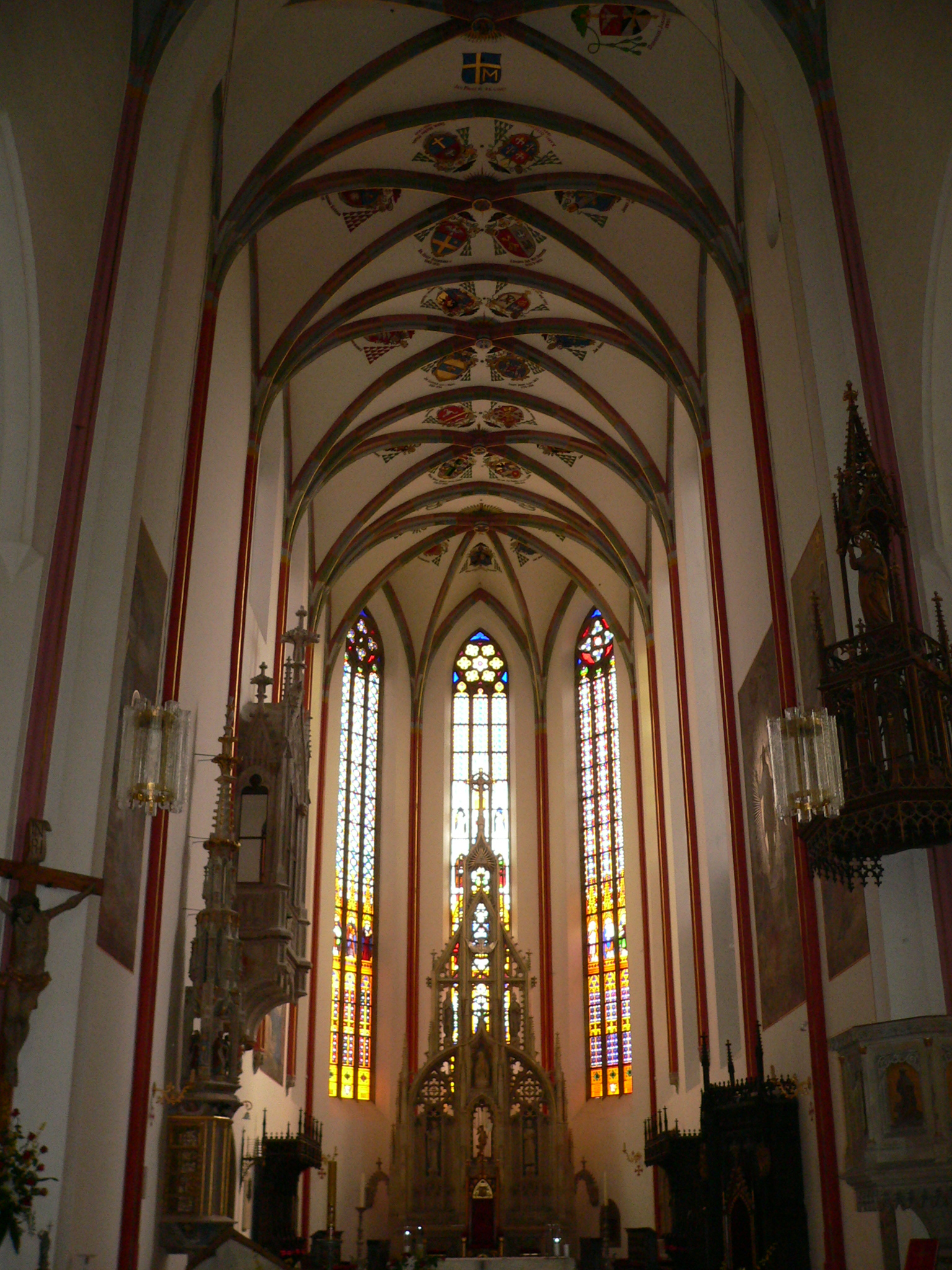
Presbytery of Cathedral of the Holy Spirit

The project of a new parish church counted with a three-nave basilica, two towers at the corners of the presbytery and external supporting system. But construction of the church was unexpectedly divided into several phases, for example because of the many fires that damaged the emerging church.

==== First period ====
The first period of construction took place between 1339 and 1342, during this time was built the presbytery for serving church purposes. At this stage were also constructed two towers at the corners of the presbytery, piscinium and sanctuary.

==== Second period ====
The second phase of construction was connected with the action of Queen Elizabeth of Pomerania. Elizabeth became the second queen, which greatly influenced the history of the church and also the history of the city. Her influence was mainly due to the fact that she has become the second wife of King Charles IV. In 1363 she received dowry towns, among them Hradec Králové. The completing of the church is attributed to Elizabeth.

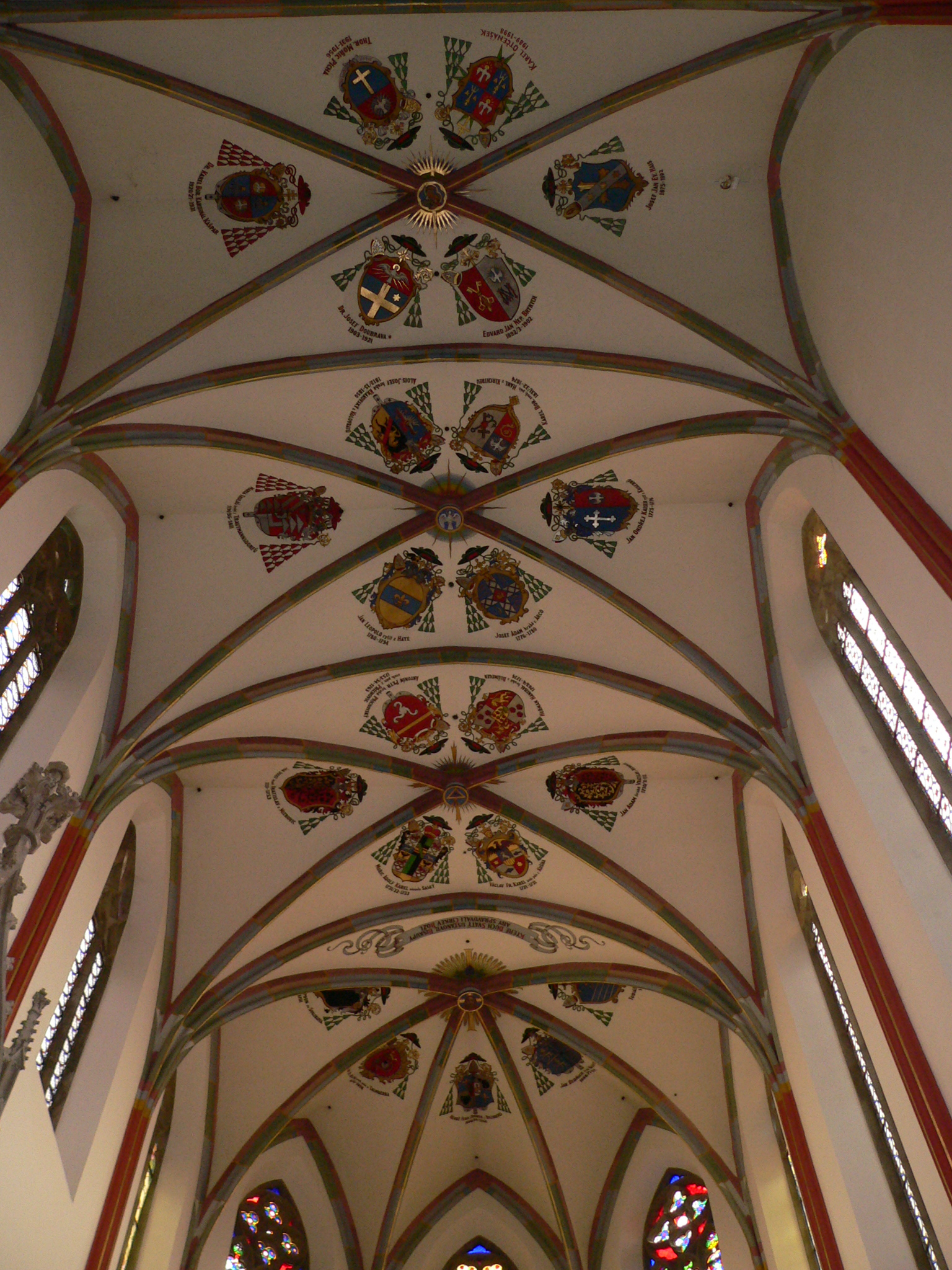
Presbytery of Cathedral of the Holy Spirit Hradec Králové

The target of this phase was the finish of the construction of three naves and the connecting of the presbytery to the dean's sacristy. Neither this appearance of the church was not preserved because the church was damaged by another fire in 1407. The Church required extensive reconstructions. Due to Hussite Wars stopped the repairs for decades. However, history of Hradec Králové and the cathedral itself was influenced by the Hussite wars. Since 1420 Hradec Králové belonged to significant Hussite centers and former priest Ambrož Hradecký from the Holy Spirit was important leader of this movement. Thanks that the Cathedral of the Holy Spirit was not destroyed and plundered. About the importance of the city and the church speaks also the fact that in 1424 there was held the funeral of Jan Žižka, a prominent Hussite leader. According to legend, the remains of Jan Žižka were placed into one of four crypts, which are located below the cathedral. The construction of the church was completed in 1463 and provided a new temple appearance without maintaining external support system. The western side of the triple nave been enriched by a new loft that served to musicians and Literate Brotherhood, which provided singing during ceremonies.

==== The third period ====
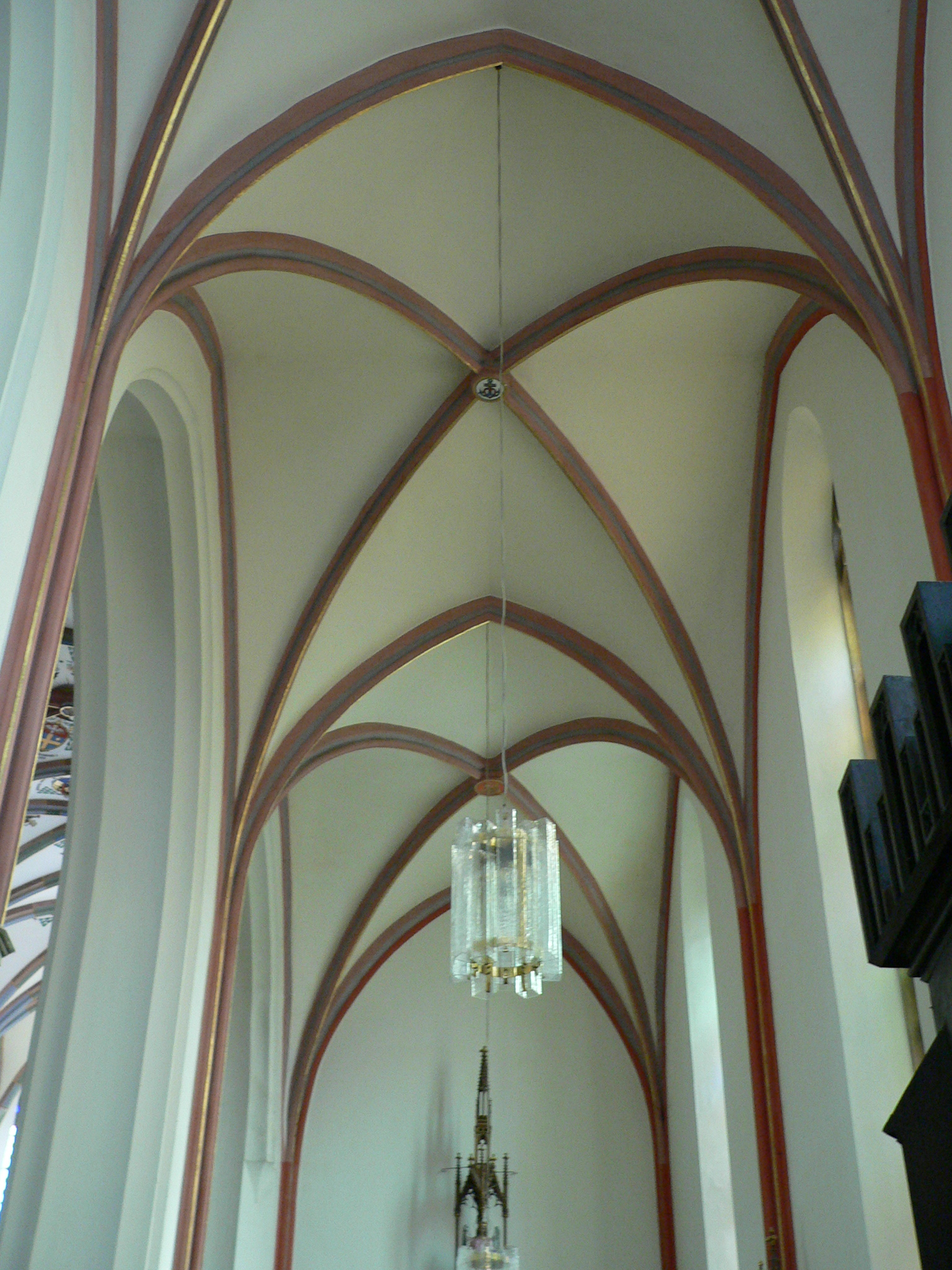
Ribs of Cathedral of the Holy Spirit

In 1484 the city was again struck with a large fire which destroyed the entire city and the church, and that caused other repairs and renovations. The fire particularly affected and melted church's bells. Repairs included especially new towers and installation of new bells, which have survived to this day. The fire completely destroyed the sanctuary as well and there was made a new type of late Gothic sanctuary called pastoforium. This pastoforium reportedly originated in 1497 in the workshop of the famous Prague´s stonemason and architect Matěj Rejsek. We can found this pastoforium in the left north side of the presbytery. It is one of the jewels of the Cathedral of the Holy Spirit.

==== 17th–20th century ====
The church construction was repaired several times during this period, for example it was looted and partly burnt down by Swedish soldiers in 1639. Thanks the founding of the bishopric of the church became a cathedral in 1664 and was then rebuilt in Baroque style, followed by further adjustments in the late 18th century. In the years 1864–1876 the church was radically repaired in a Neo-Gothic style by architects Francis Schmoranz and L. Labera. In the years 1980–1990 the church got a copper roofing.

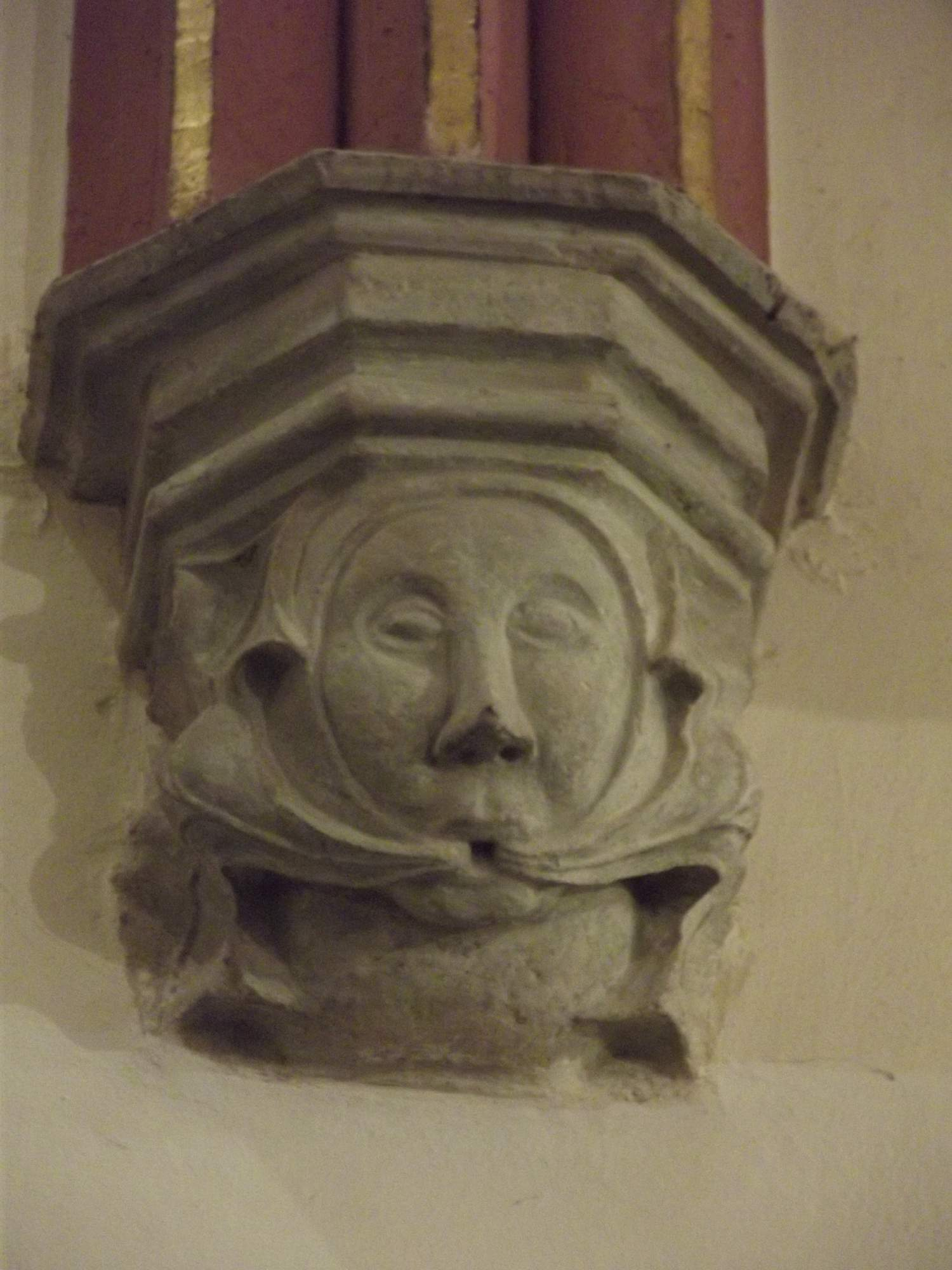
Mascaron

=== Interior ===
The interior of the church was mainly influenced by donations of queens, which was a dowry town of Hradec Králové. Perhaps most significantly into the interior of the Cathedral of the Holy Spirit reflected the influence of second wife of Wenceslaus IV Sophia of Bavaria, who won dowry town around 1400 after the death of Elizabeth of Pomerania. She gave its cities due diligence and pushed for their architectural development. It reached mainly through its building works, led by former Prague masters. Cathedral of the Holy Spirit and was enriched by a number of elements that resemble Prague patterns.

==== Naves ====
The church walls are whitewashed with colour underlined ribs of cross vault. Ribs are led in bundles and ended on brackets with mascaron or floristic motif. Ribs are connected in the middle of the vault with the circular keystone, which is thematically painted. In the central nave are also paintings of the saint patrons. Under the organ loft is a jump vault in the center field, which has ribs decorated with lacy tracery. These ribs converge into a circular keystone with the letter G (Gradec) – as Hradec.

==== Presbytery ====
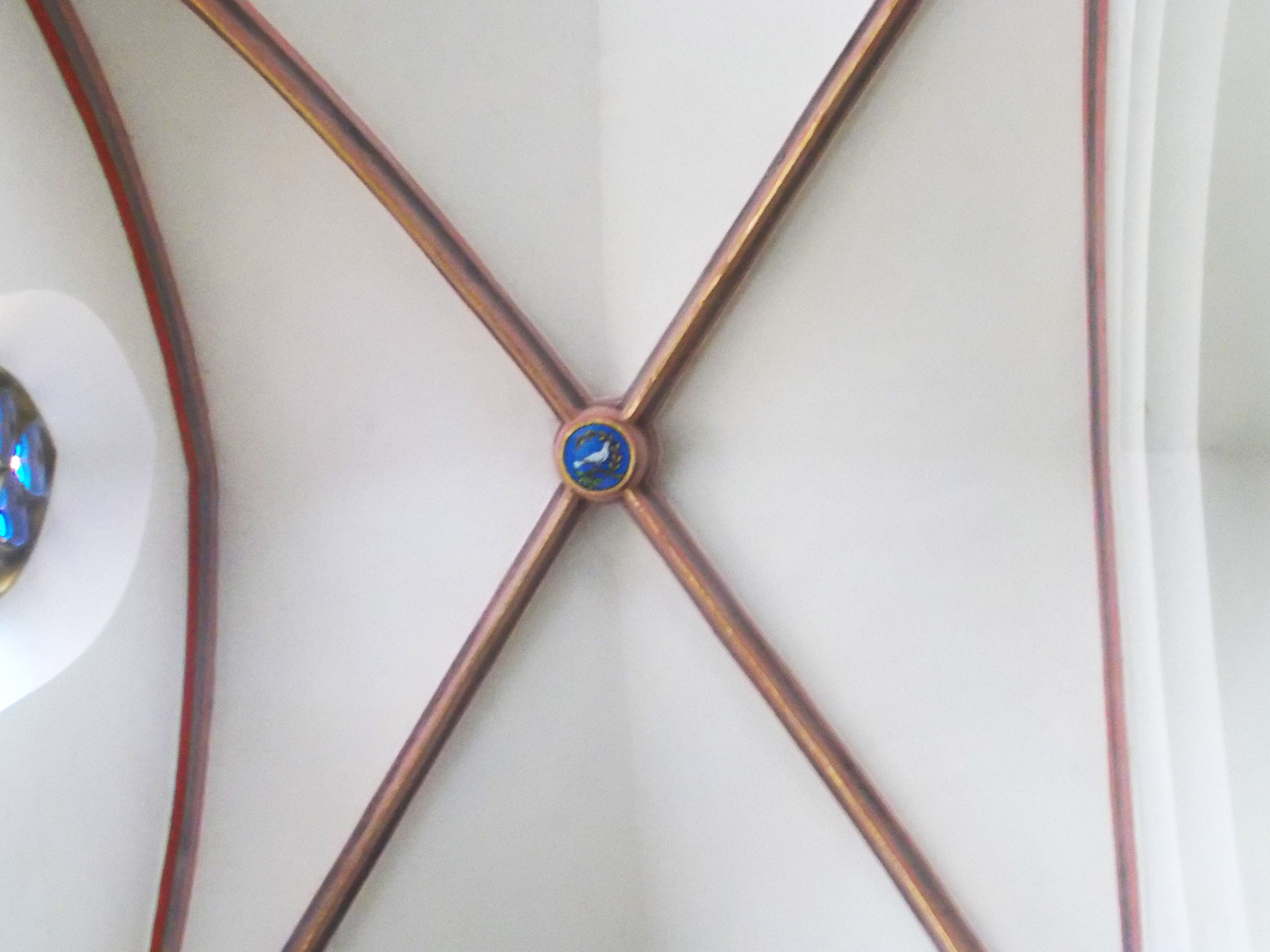
Keystone

The presbytery is a place for spiritual ceremonies. This space is elevated by one step from the rest of the church. The bundles of the ribs in presbytery are mostly tight to the ground. Besides painted keystones is the ceiling decorated with painted coats of arms of the diocesan bishops, archbishops and Pope John Paul II.

==== Royal hall ====
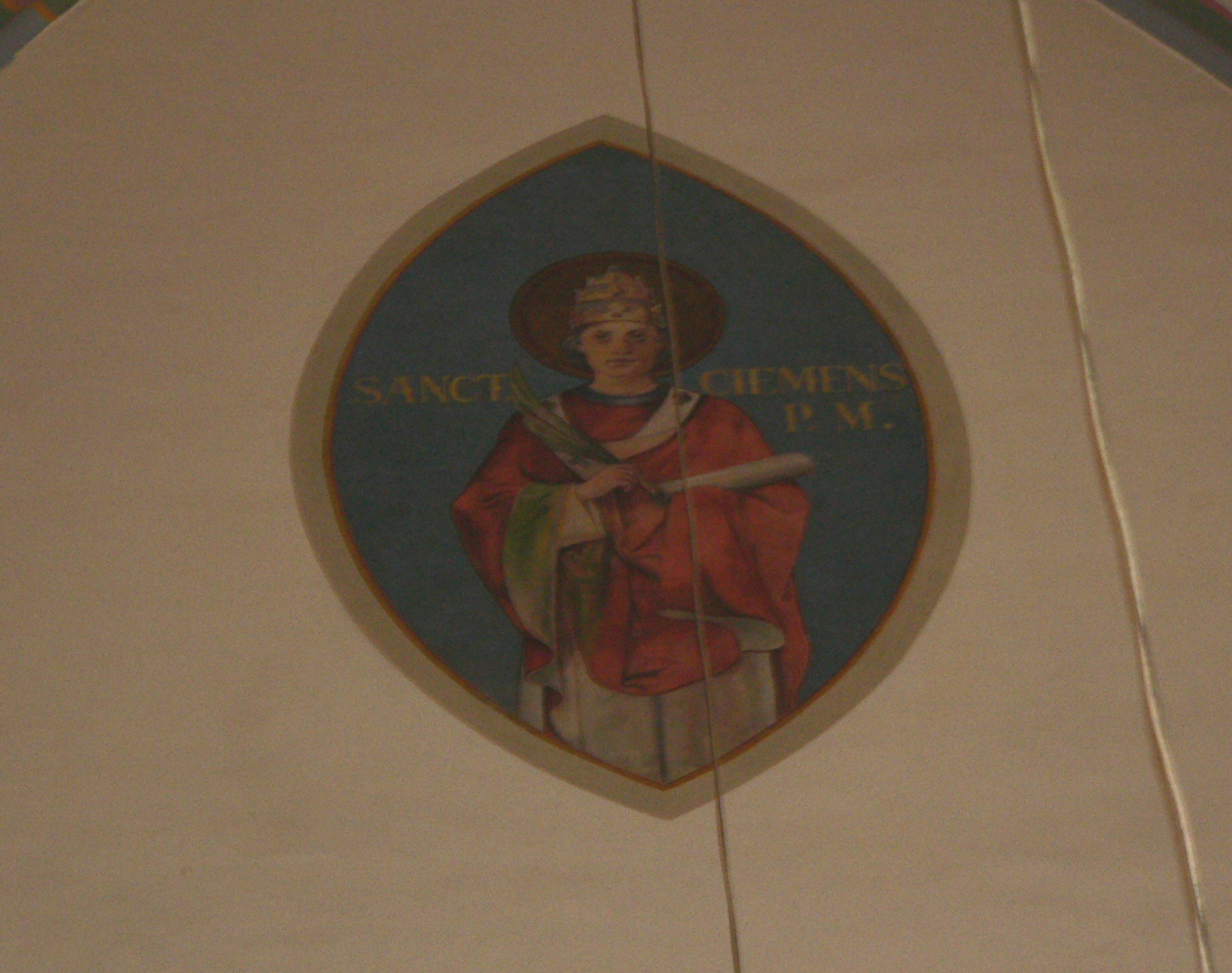
St. Clement

Royal hallway is located between the south tower and dean sacristy. The adjective "royal" was assigned to the hallway mainly due to its high aesthetic value and because of its atypical vaulting. It may be indicative of the work of Michal Parler, brother of more famous architect Peter Parler.

The hall has a unique use of ribs complemented with tracery. The clash of the ribs in the crown is smooth without any keystone. Ribs are ended in the consoles with floral and animal elements.

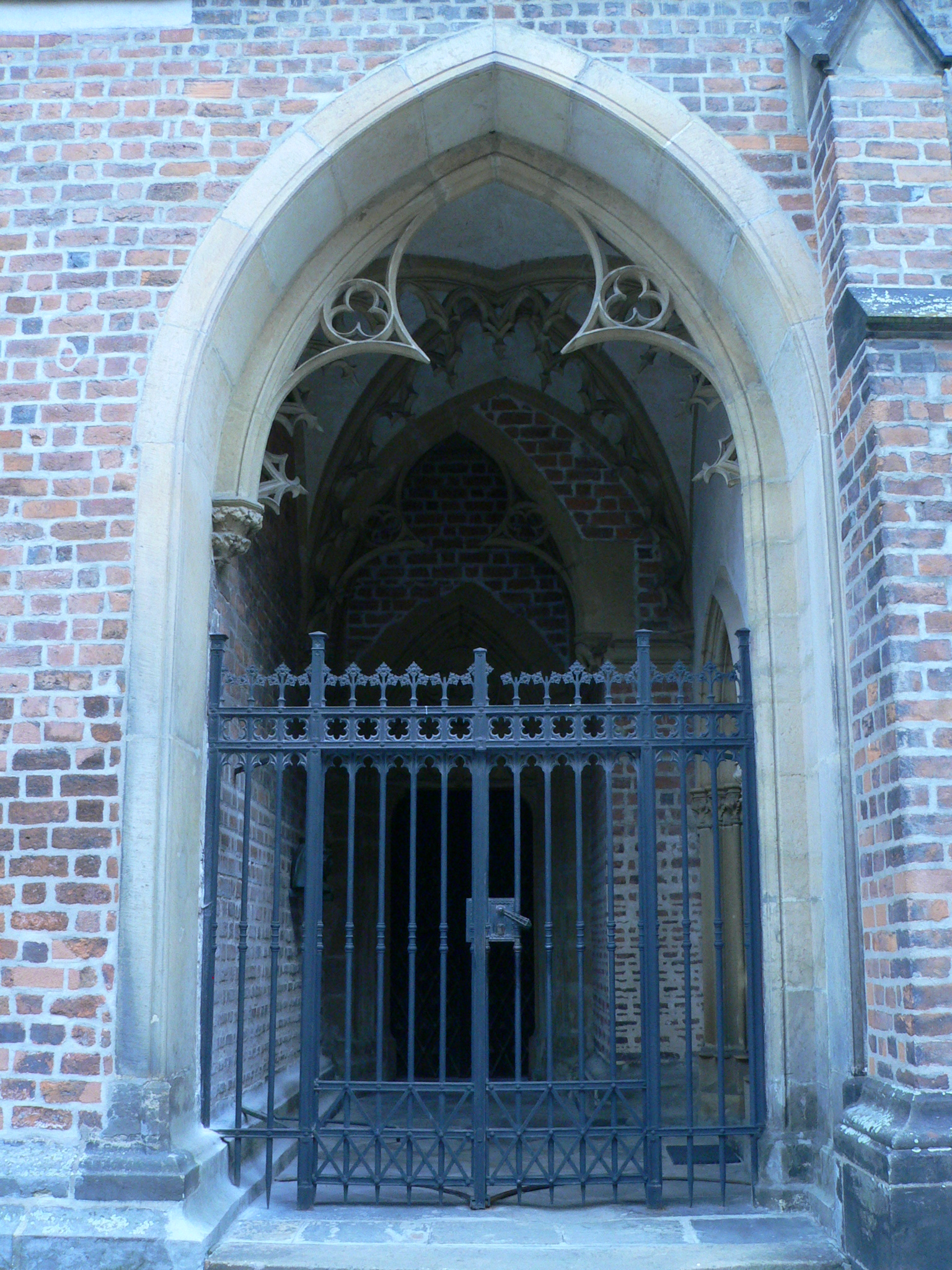
Royal hall

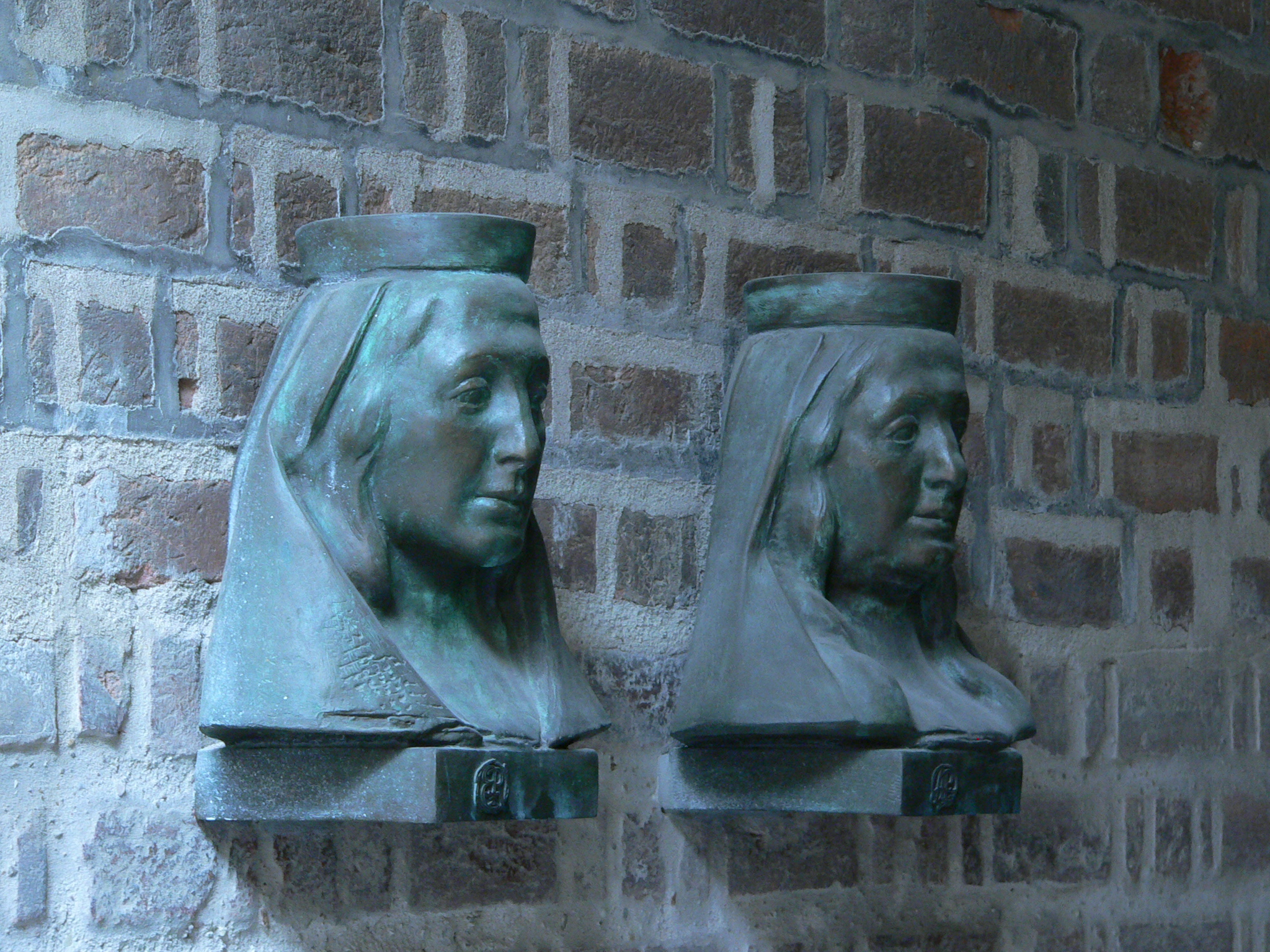
Elizabeth of Pomerania and Elizabeth Richeza of Poland

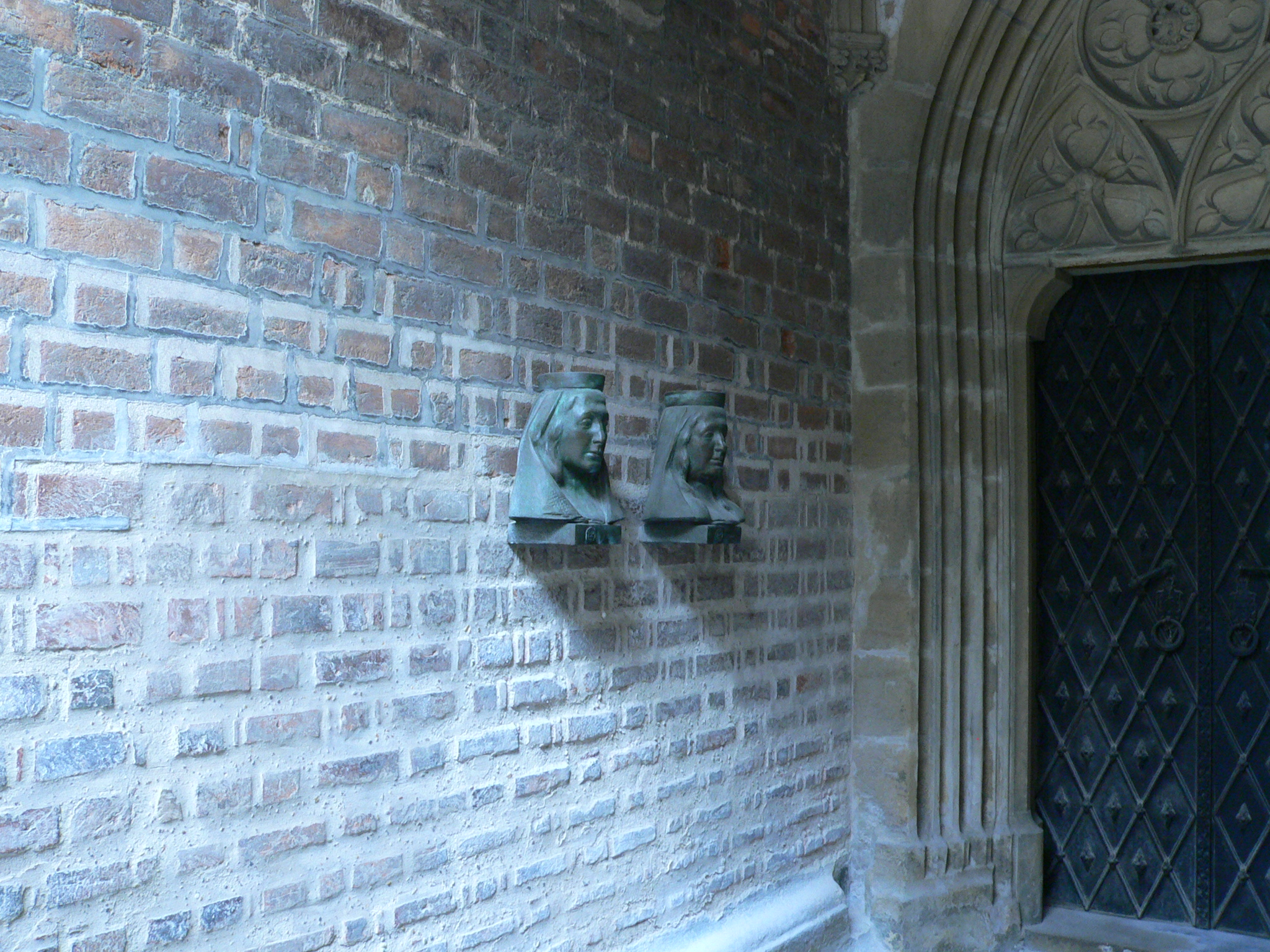
Busts of queens Elizabeth of Pomerania and Elizabeth Richeza of Poland

=== Devices ===
The devices are mostly from 19th century, sandstone reliefs are the early work of Josef Václav Myslbek. On the altar in the north nave is a painting of St. Anthony the Hermit from Petr Brandl and in the altar in the south aisle is a late Gothic Marian triptych of 1494 and tin baptismal font from 1406 is the oldest in the country.

=== Exterior ===
The building features characteristic brick architecture, a rarity among Gothic cathedrals in Czech lands. there is a hard edged contrast between red brick and white sandstone used on portals, windows and cornices of the temple. Brick was chosen because sandstone, the most commonly used building material at the time, was unavailable nearby.

The basilica has three naves and long choir leading into the Great Square. Outside of the presbytery, a cross and two towers were placed which makes symbolical connection. On the outer walls of the church are several renaissance tombstones. Massive support pillars protrude in to the exterior and are divided into three parts.

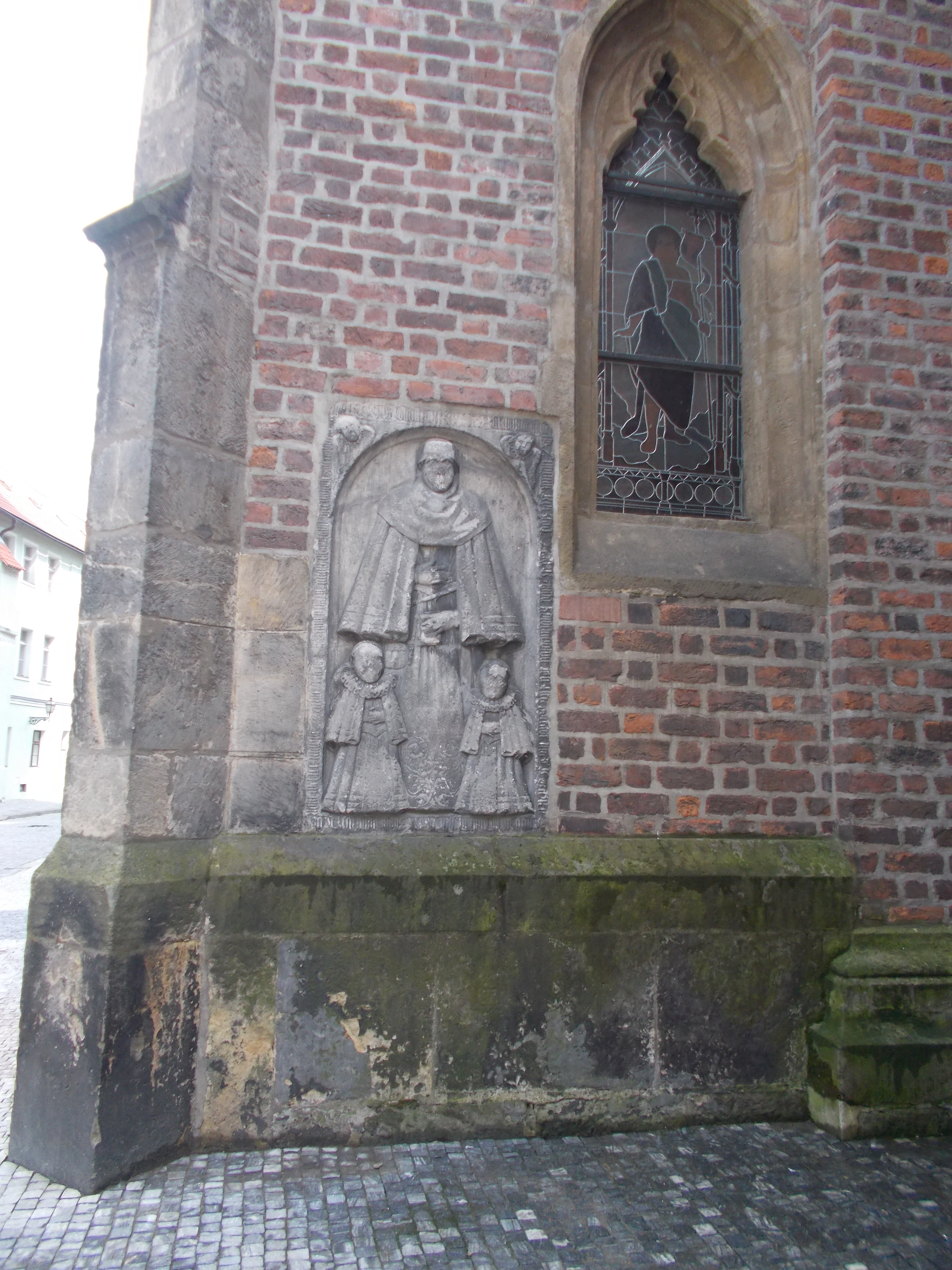
Gravestone

=== Interests ===
The Cathedral of the Holy Spirit is unique because it has survived as the only medieval Gothic church in the city and suburbs. Other Gothic churches were destroyed because of the construction of a military fort in the 18th century, which required extensive rebuilding of urban space. This had a significant influence on the appearance of the former Hradec Králové.

On 26 April 1997 Pope John Paul II visited the Diocese of Hradec Králové. To commemorate the visit of the Pope a memorial board was attached on the east wall of the church, and on 3 April 2015 the relics of Pope John Paul II. were deposited on the left side of the presbytery in a new reliquary.

Dimensions: Length 56 m, width 25 m, height 48 m

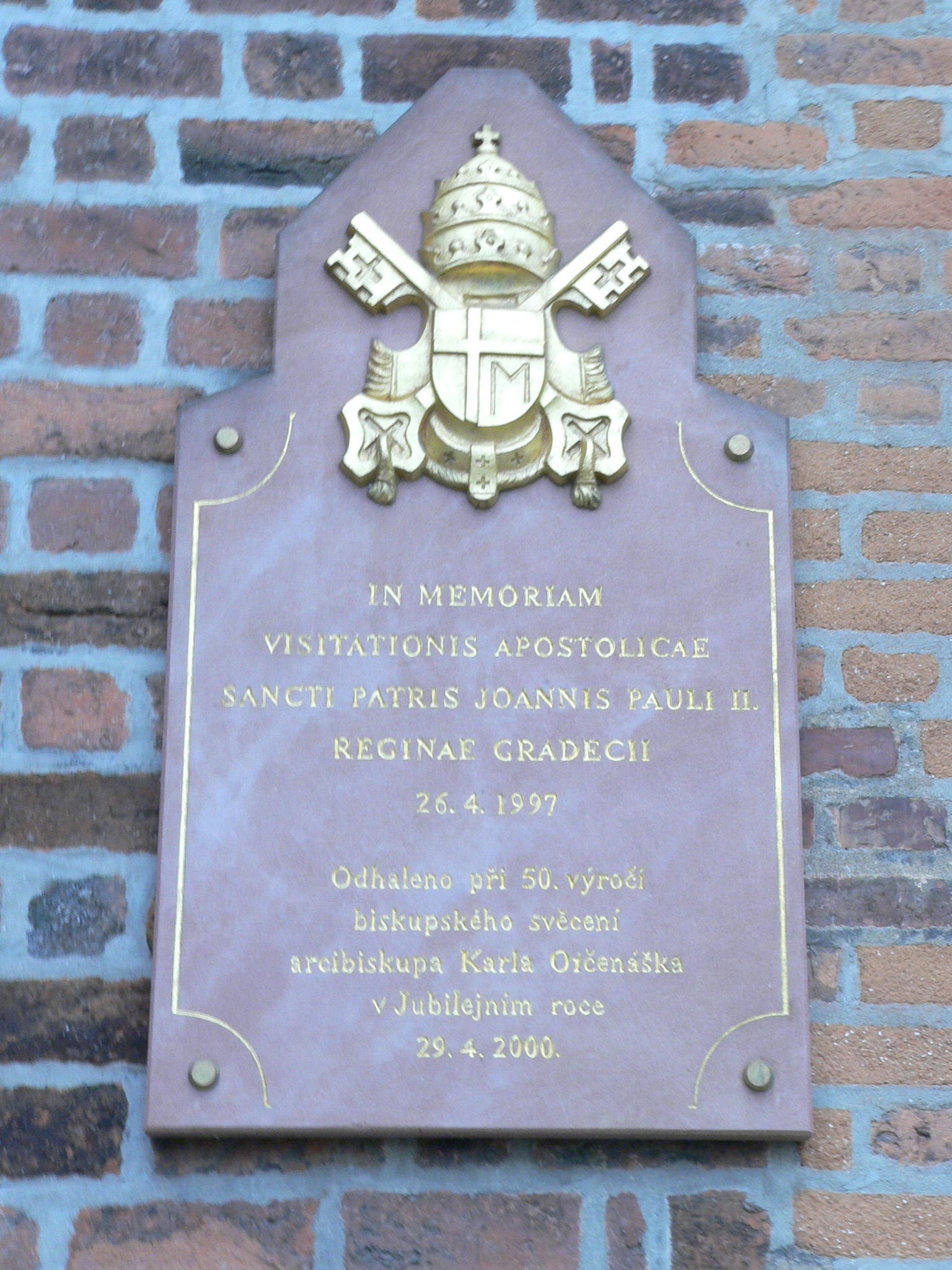
Memorial board of Pope's visit

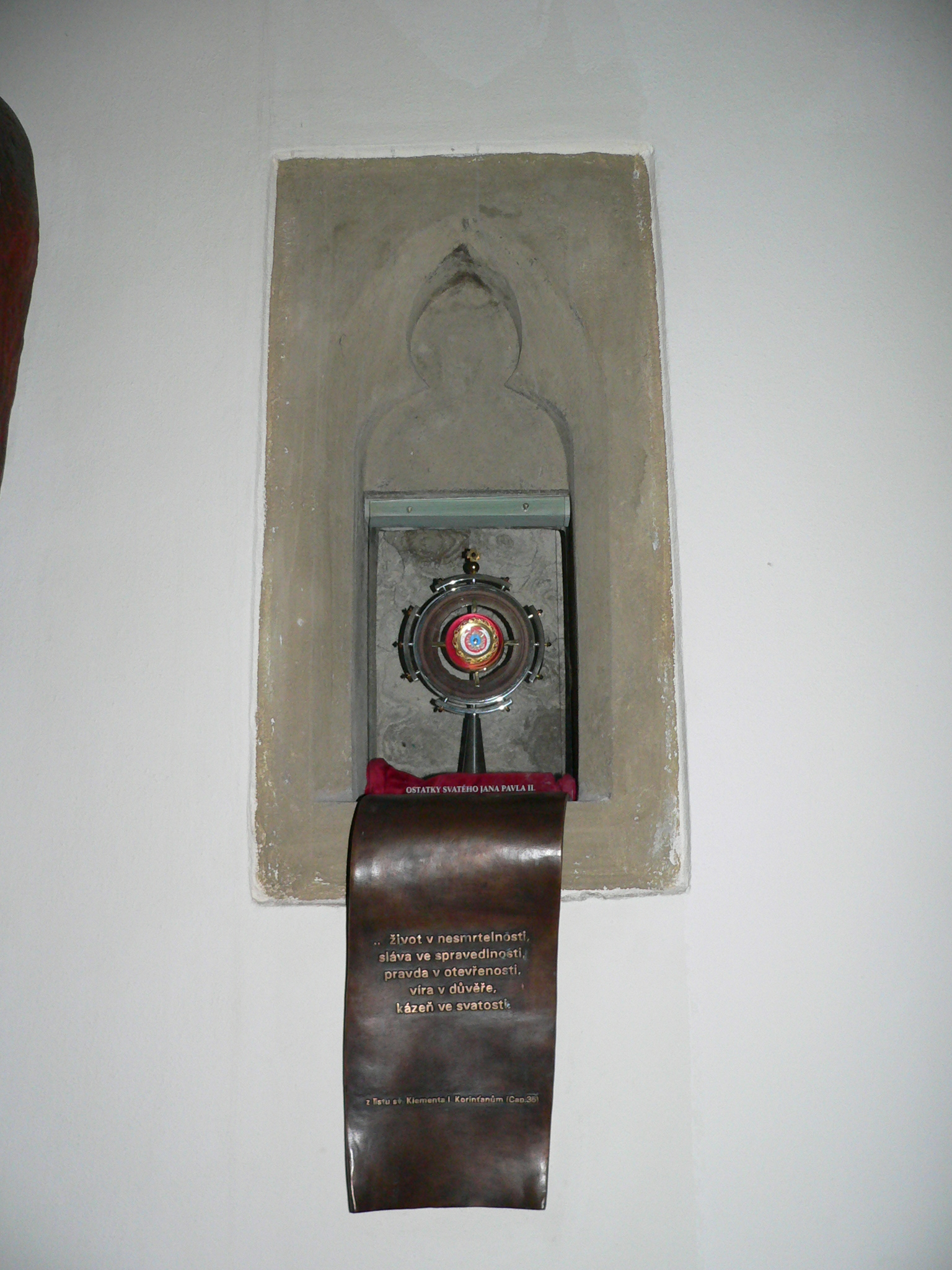
Reliquary of John Paul II

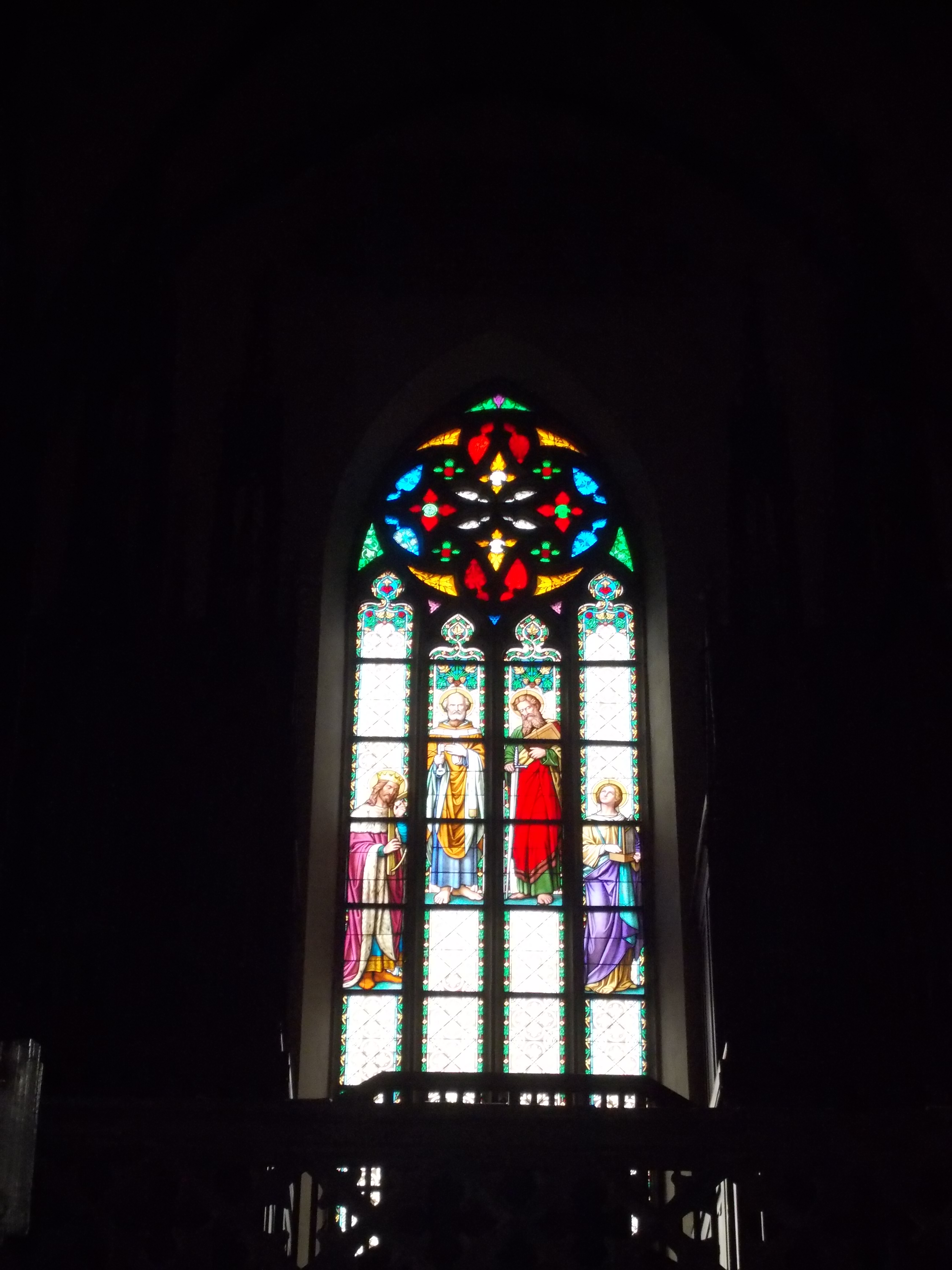
Window depicting Saints Ludmila, Peter, Paul and Wenceslaus

== Bibliography ==
- E. Poche (red.), Umělecké památky Čech I. Praha: Academia 1977.
- Dr. Hubková, H.: Středověká architektura katedrály Sv. Ducha v Hradci Králové, master thesis, FF PU Olomouc
- Kuča, Karel. Města a městečka v Čechách, na Moravě a ve Slezsku. 1. vyd. Praha: Libri, 1997, 938 s. ISBN 80-85983-12-5, pp. 451–452
