= Diocese of Hradec Králové =

Latin Catholic diocese in Czechia

Coordinates: 50°N 16°E

Diocese of Hradec Králové Dioecesis Riginae Gradecensis Diecéze královéhradecká

Catholic
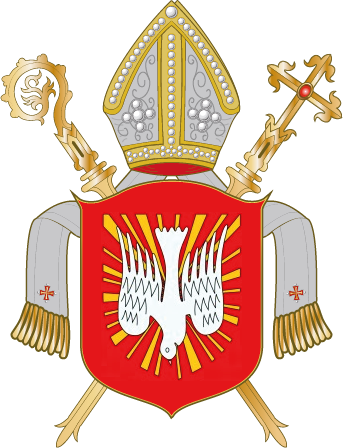

Location
- Country: Czech Republic
- Metropolitan: Prague

Statistics
- Area: 11,650 km^{2} (4,500 sq mi)
- Population: Total; Catholics: (as of 2019); 1,274,200; 450,800 (35.4%)

Information
- Denomination: Catholic Church
- Sui iuris church: Latin Church
- Rite: Roman Rite
- Cathedral: Cathedral of the Holy Spirit; Katedrála Svatého Ducha

Current leadership
- Pope: Leo XIV
- Bishop: Jan Vokál
- Auxiliary Bishops: Josef Kajnek

Map
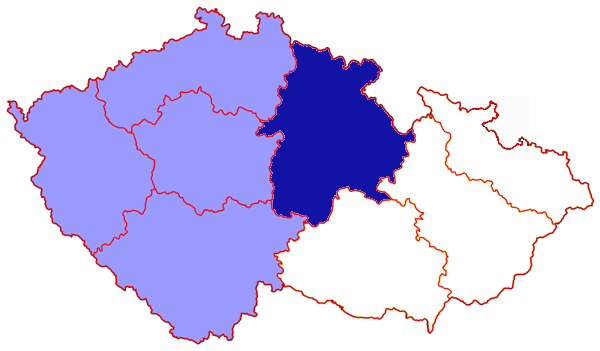
- Dark blue: Diocese of Hradec Králové; Light blue: Ecclesiastical Province of Prague

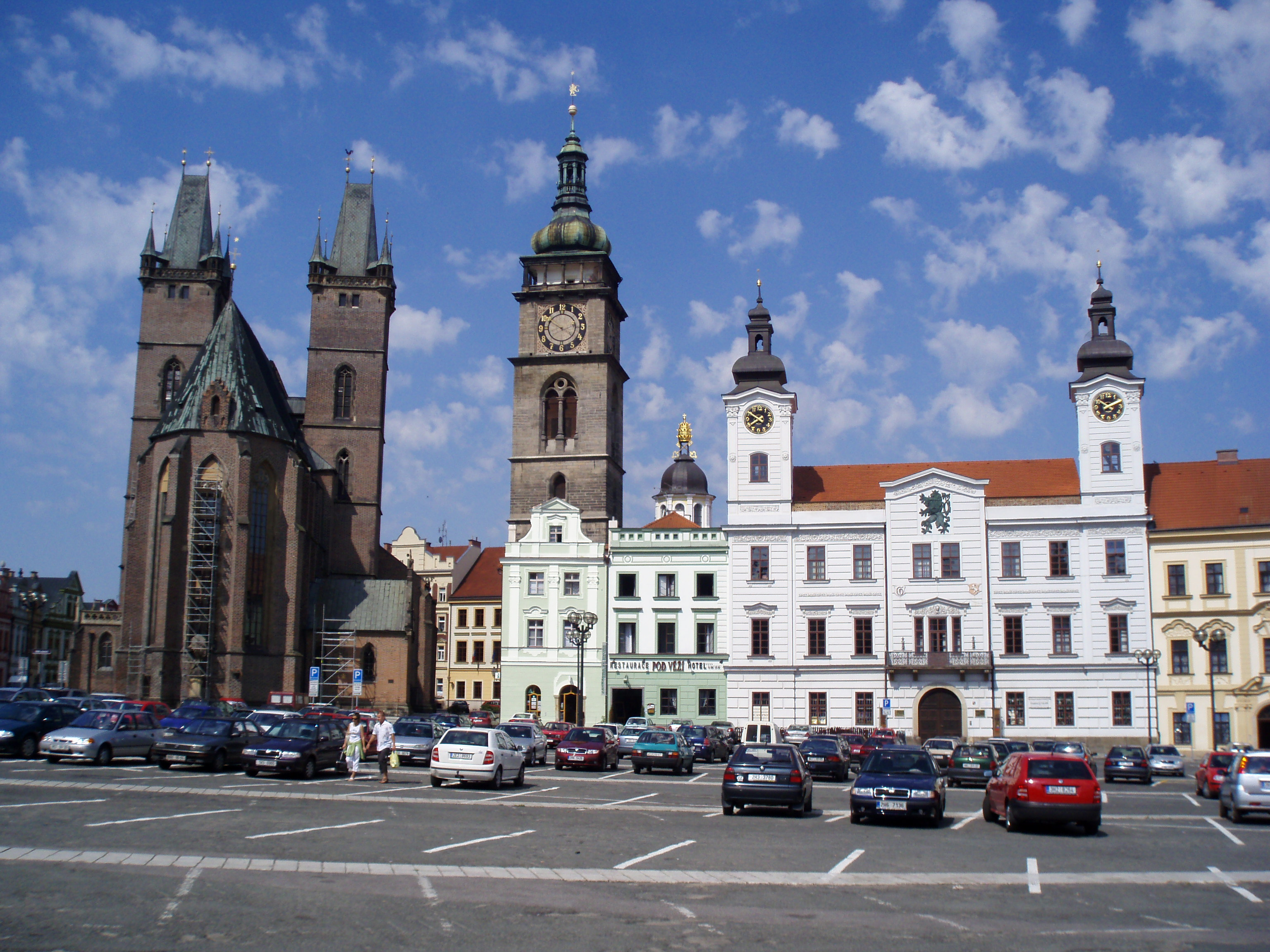
Cathedral of the Holy Spirit

The Diocese of Hradec Králové (Latin: Reginae Gradecen(sis), German: Bistum Königgrätz) is a Latin diocese of the Catholic Church located in the city of Hradec Králové in the Ecclesiastical Province of Prague in the Czech Republic.

== History ==
On 10 November 1664, the diocese was established from the Metropolitan Archdiocese of Prague.

On 28 June 1972, Pope Paul VI – by his Apostolic constitution Episcoporum Poloniae coetus – redrew boundaries of a number of Polish, Czech, and German dioceses, removing the County of Kladsko area from the Diocese of Hradec Králové and assigning it to the neighbouring Archdiocese of Wrocław.

== Bishops ==
- Matthäus Ferdinand Sobek von Bilenberg, (10 November 1664 – 11 March 1669), appointed Archbishop of Prague
- Johann Friedrich Reichsgraf von Waldstein (16 June 1668 – 2 December 1675), appointed Archbishop of Prague
- Johann Franz Christoph Freiherr von Talmberg (15 January 1676 – 3 April 1698)
- Gottfried Freiherr Kapaun von Swoykow (23 September 1698 – 18 September 1701)
- Tobias Johannes Becker (24 November 1701 – 11 September 1710)
- Johann Adam Reichsgraf von Wratislaw von Mitrowitz (12 November 1710 – 24 September 1721), appointed Bishop of Litoměřice
- Wenzel Franz Karl Reichsfreiherr Koschinsky von Koschín (9 January 1721 – 26 March 1731)
- Moritz Adolf Karl Herzog von Sachsen-Zeitz (8 October 1731 – 1 October 1733), appointed Bishop of Litoměřice
- Johann Joseph von Wratislaw von Mitrowitz (6 July 1733 – 11 September 1753)
- Anton Peter Graf Przichowsky von Przichowitz (29 September 1753 – 26 October 1763)
- Hermann Hannibal Reichsgraf von Blümegen (5 November 1763 – 17 October 1774)
- Johann Andreas Kayser von Kaysern (14 May 1775 – 5 May 1776)
- Joseph Adam von Arco (15 July 1776 – 1 January 1780), appointed Bishop of Seckau, Austria
- Johann Leopold Ritter von Hay (29 July 1780 – 1 June 1794)
- Maria-Thaddeus von Trauttmansdorf-Wiesnberg (1 July 1795 – 26 November 1811), appointed Archbishop of Olomouc
- Alois Jozef Krakowski von Kolowrat (15 March 1815 – 28 February 1831), appointed Archbishop of Prague
- Karel Boromejský Hanl z Kirchtreu (24 February 1832 – 1874)
- Josef Jan Hais (5 July 1875 – 27 October 1892)
- Eduard Jan Brynyck (19 January 1893 – 20 November 1902)
- Josef Doubrava (22 June 1903 – 22 February 1921)
- Karel Kašpar (13 June 1921 – 22 October 1931), appointed Archbishop of Prague
- Maurizio Picha (22 October 1931 – 12 November 1956)
- Karel Otčenášek (apostolic administrator 30 March 1950 – 21 December 1989); see below
- Karel Otčenášek (21 December 1989 – 6 June 1998); see above
- Dominik Duka, (6 June 1998 – 13 February 2010), appointed Archbishop of Prague
- Jan Vokál (3 March 2011 – present)

== See also ==
- Catholic Church in the Czech Republic

== Sources ==
- GCatholic.org
- Catholic Hierarchy
- Diocese website
