= Dominik Duka =

Archbishop of Prague from 2010 to 2022

His Eminence Dominik Duka OP
- Cardinal, Archbishop of Prague
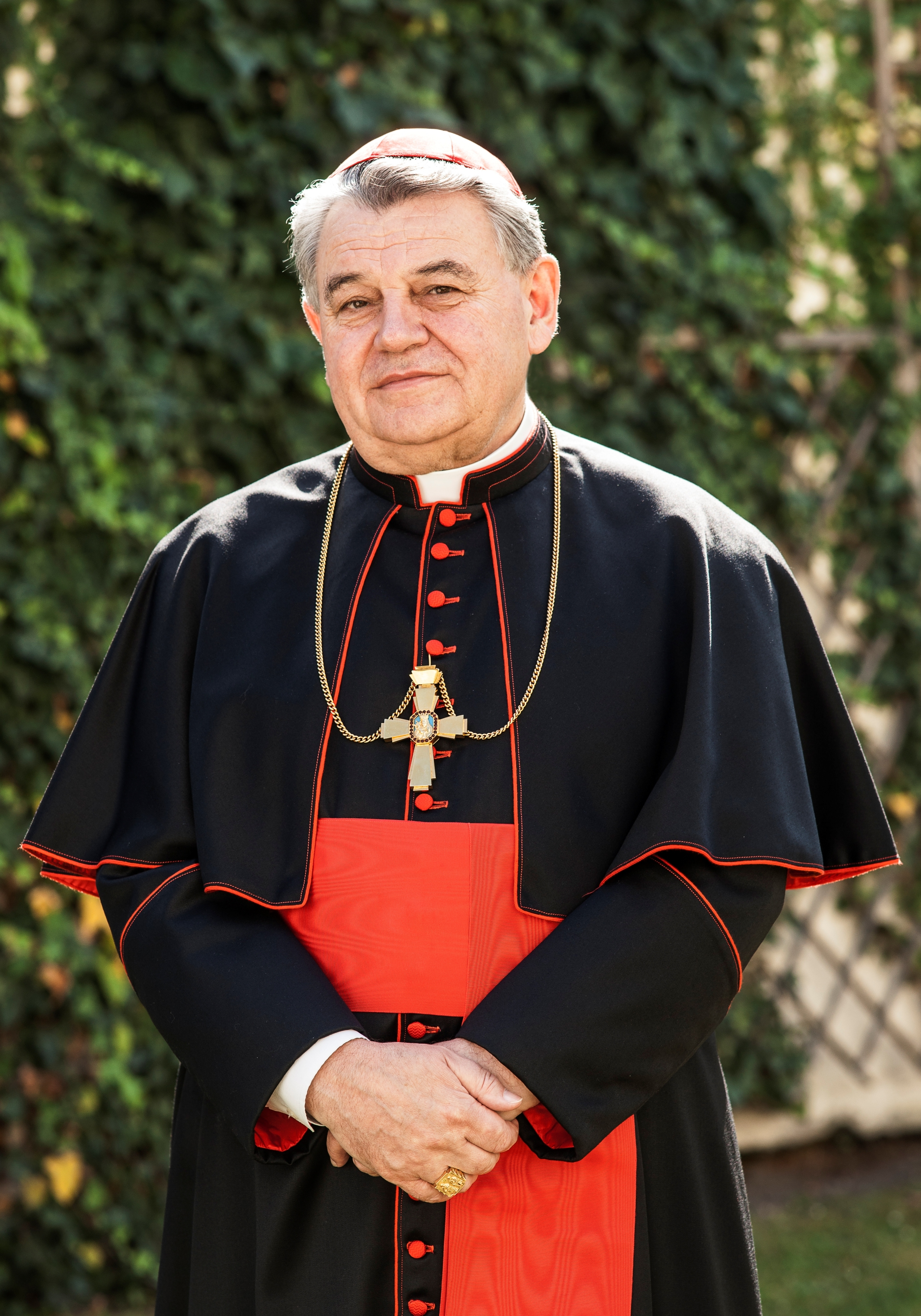
- Duka in 2014
- Archdiocese: Prague
- Appointed: 13 February 2010
- Installed: 10 April 2010
- Term ended: 13 May 2022
- Predecessor: Miloslav Vlk
- Successor: Jan Graubner
- Other post: Cardinal-Priest of Santi Marcellino e Pietro
- Previous posts: Bishop of Hradec Králové (1998–2010); Apostolic Administrator of Litoměřice (2004–2008); Archbishop of Prague (2010–2022)

Orders
- Ordination: 22 June 1970 by Štěpán Trochta
- Consecration: 26 September 1998 by Karel Otčenášek
- Created cardinal: 18 February 2012 by Benedict XVI
- Rank: Cardinal-Priest

Personal details
- Born: 26 April 1943 Hradec Králové, Protectorate of Bohemia and Moravia
- Died: 4 November 2025 (aged 82) Prague, Czech Republic
- Denomination: Catholic
- Motto: In Spiritu Veritatis; "In the Spirit of Truth"

- Coat of arms

Styles of Dominik Duka
- Reference style: His Eminence
- Spoken style: Your Eminence
- Informal style: Cardinal

Dominik Jaroslav Duka, O.P. (26 April 1943 – 4 November 2025) was a Czech Catholic prelate who served as Archbishop of Prague from 2010 to 2022. He was made a cardinal in 2012. He was also a member of the Dominican Order.

Duka served as Bishop of Hradec Králové from 1998 to 2010. He was the spiritual protector and chaplain general of the Orléans obedience of the Military and Hospitaller Order of Saint Lazarus of Jerusalem from 2012 to 2021.

== Early life ==
Duka was born on 26 April 1943 in Hradec Králové in the Protectorate of Bohemia and Moravia (now in the Czech Republic). His father was an army officer who fought for the allied forces in World War II, based at RAF Cosford, who was later imprisoned in Czechoslovakia in the 1950s. Duka graduated from Tyl Grammar School in Hradec Králové in 1960 and worked in a factory and as an apprentice locksmith before entering military service from 1962 to 1964.

On 6 January 1969, he made his temporary profession as a member of the Dominicans and on 22 June 1970 he was ordained a priest by Cardinal Štěpán Trochta, Bishop of Litoměřice. For five years, he worked in parishes of the Archdiocese of Prague and, on 7 January 1972, he made his solemn profession as a Dominican.

In 1975, the Communist government of Czechoslovakia revoked Duka's authorization to work as a priest. From then until the Velvet Revolution in 1989, Duka worked as a designer at the Škoda factory in Plzeň. At the same time he continued to work secretly as a Dominican and was elected Vicar Provincial, serving from 1975 until 1987. From 1976 to 1981, he served as a master of the clergy. In 1979, he obtained a licentiate in theology at the Theological Faculty of St. John the Baptist in Warsaw, Poland.

As a result of his activities with the Dominicans and his involvement in the publication of unauthorised samizdat literature, he was imprisoned in Bory Prison in Plzeň from 1981 to 1982, where his fellow prisoners included future Czech President Václav Havel. While in prison, Duka conducted a clandestine mass for other prisoners disguised as a chess club. From 1986 to 1998, he was Prior Provincial of the Dominicans in Bohemia and Moravia. From 1990 to 1998, he was a lecturer in the Faculty of Theology at Palacký University in Olomouc, teaching Introduction to Sacred Scripture and biblical anthropology.

Duka was elected to a three-year term as president of the Conference of Major Superiors of the Czech Republic in 1989. From 1992 to 1996, he was vice president of the Union of European Conferences of Major Superiors.

== Bishop ==
On 6 June 1998, Duka was appointed bishop of Hradec Králové. He received episcopal consecration on 26 September 1998. On 13 February 2010, Pope Benedict XVI appointed him Archbishop of Prague. Duka was installed in Prague's St. Vitus Cathedral. On his appointment, Duka said:

The Church must engage in a dialogue with society and must seek reconciliation with it. Twenty years ago, we were euphoric about freedom; today we live in an economic and financial crisis, and also to a certain extent in a crisis of values. So the tasks are going to be a little more difficult. But thanks to everything that's been done, it will not be a journey into the unknown.

One of Duka's chief concerns was the long-standing issue of the restitution of church property, which had been confiscated by the communist regime and which was either never fully returned or for which the church never received compensation. The Czech Republic is one of the last countries in Europe not to have ratified a treaty with the Holy See. After previous attempts at an agreement had failed—most notably in 2008 under Cardinal Miloslav Vlk—the Czech government in mid-January 2012 agreed to a compensation plan, under which the country's seventeen churches, both Catholic and Protestant, would get 56% of their former property now held by the state, an amount estimated at 75 billion koruna ($3.7 billion), and another 59 billion koruna ($2.9 billion) in financial compensation paid over the next thirty years. The state will also gradually stop covering the churches' expenses over the next seventeen years.

On 23 December 2011, Duka presided at the funeral liturgy of Václav Havel.

== Cardinal ==
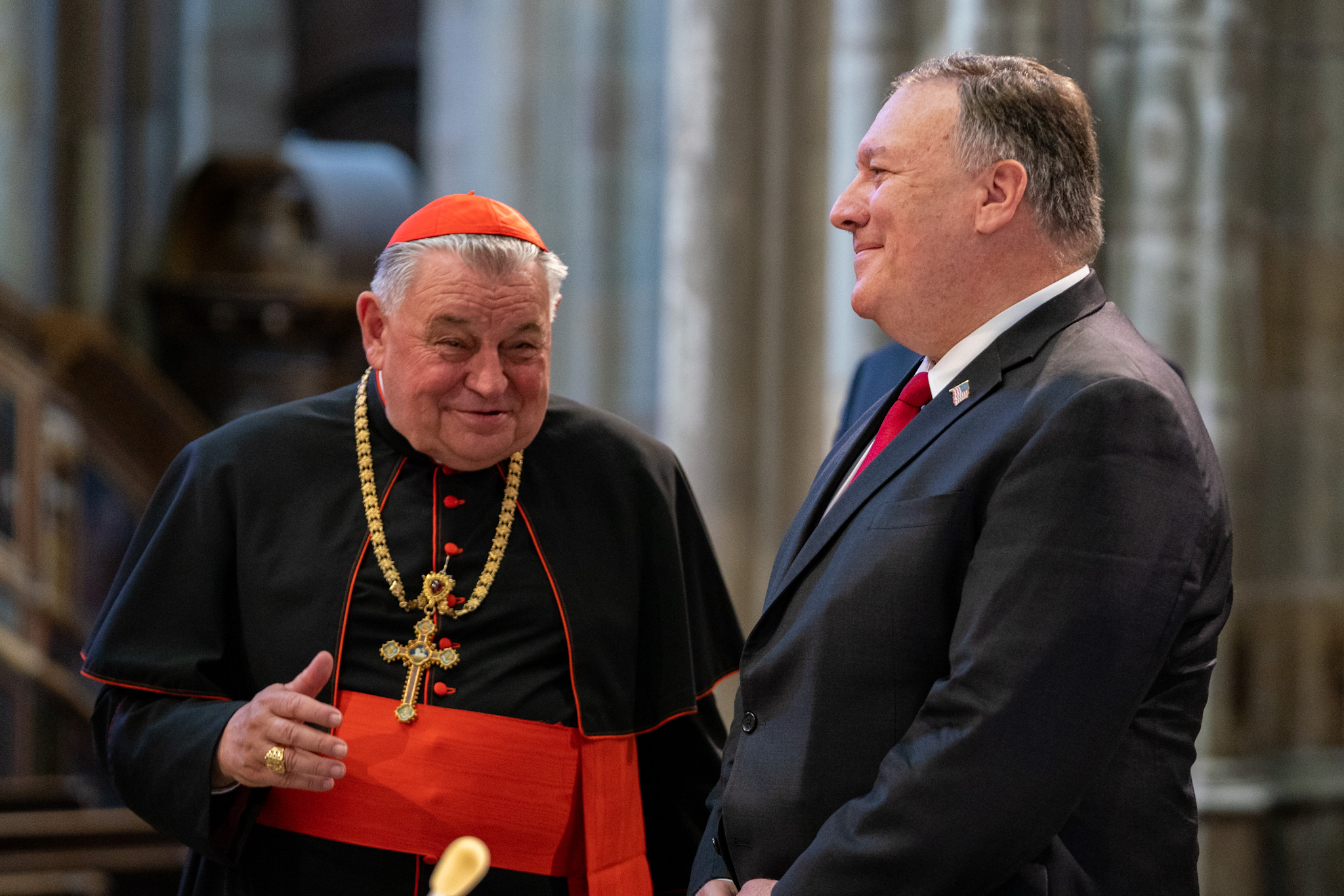
Duka gives the U.S. Secretary of State, Mike Pompeo, a private tour of St. Wenceslas Chapel inside St. Vitus Cathedral on 12 August 2020

On 18 February 2012, Duka was made cardinal priest of Santi Marcellino e Pietro by Pope Benedict XVI. On 21 April 2012, he was appointed a member of the Congregation for Institutes of Consecrated Life and Societies of Apostolic Life and the Pontifical Council for Justice and Peace.

Duka was one of the cardinal electors who participated in the 2013 papal conclave that elected Pope Francis.

Duka contributed to a book, Eleven Cardinals Speak on Marriage and the Family, which urged fellow church leaders to maintain the church's rules regarding marriage and strengthen Catholic education about marriage and family life. The book was released before the international Synod of Bishops on the Family held in 2014 and 2015.

In May 2016, Duka said that the pope could not fully understand the European migrant crisis because he is not from Europe. Duka frequently spoke against Muslim immigration into Europe. He said that Islam had "violent tendencies", and that Muslims could only be considered a "safe presence" if they made up less than five percent of the population.

Duka had several clashes with the theologian Tomáš Halík. In August 2015, Duka canceled the use of the church led by Halík as the venue for a conference by Jeannine Gramick, an American nun specialising in pastoral care for LGBT people, as well as the church's use for the screening of a Polish film about a homosexual priest. In a statement setting out his objections, Duka said: "Most participants are not believers and have no intention of addressing their relationship with the Church. Since I do not think people with this sexual orientation are discriminated against in our country, it is not right for us to advocate things which are in direct conflict with the Catholic Church's teachings." In 2016, Halík criticized Duka for allegedly dissociating himself from the pope and for being too close to Czech president Miloš Zeman, as well as for accepting the highest state award from Zeman in October 2016.

In February 2018, a group of Czech Catholic laymen wrote a letter to Pope Francis, expressing concern about Duka's closeness to Czech politicians including Václav Klaus, Miloš Zeman and Tomio Okamura, and urging him not to extend Duka's term as archbishop when he submitted his resignation as required upon turning 75 in April 2018. On 13 May 2022, Pope Francis accepted Duka's resignation as archbishop.

== Later life and death ==
On 18 September 2025, Duka celebrated a Requiem Mass for murdered American political activist Charlie Kirk at the Church of Our Lady before Týn. The Mass was attended by hundreds of worshippers, including politicians, while dozens of demonstrators gathered in front of the church to hold banners describing Kirk as "fascist, racist and sexist". Catholic historian Jaroslav Šebek criticized Duka for celebrating a Mass with a "political dimension".

Duka died on 4 November 2025 at the age of 82, a day after being hospitalised at the Central Military Hospital in Prague where he had undergone surgery several weeks earlier.

== Awards and honours ==
- On 28 October 2001, Duka was awarded the I Grade Medal of Merit for the Czech Republic by President Havel.
- On 2 June 2003, he was awarded the II Grade Cross of Merit.
- On 3 June 2008, the I Grade Cross of Merit by the Minister of Defense Vlasta Parkanová.
- On 20 June 2007, he was awarded the Grand Cross "Pro Piis Meritis" of the Sovereign Military Order of Malta.
- On 19 September 2012, he was awarded the decoration of Knight degree of the Legion of Honour.
- On 28 October 2016, he was awarded the Grand Cross of the Order of the White Lion.
- Doctor honoris causa from the Faculty of Theology of the University of Fribourg, Switzerland (15 November 2010)
- Grand Cross and Chaplain General of the Orleans obedience of the Order of Saint Lazarus. Duka was stripped of the Grand Cross and his appointment as Chaplain General was revoked by exclusion from the Order by Grand Master Count Jan Dobrzenský z Dobrzenicz on 1 January 2021.
- On 19 November 2024, Duka was awarded the 25th Hanno R. Ellenbogen Citizenship Award at the Palffy Palace, Bratislava, by the Prague Society for International Cooperation and Global Panel Foundation, to mark the 35th anniversary of the Velvet Revolution.

== Bibliography ==
- Zantovsky, Michael (2014). Havel: A Life. London: Atlantic Books. ISBN 978-0-85789-852-4.

Catholic Church titles
| Preceded by Karel Otčenášek | Bishop of Hradec Kralove; 6 June 1998 – 13 February 2010 | Succeeded by Jan Vokál |
| Preceded by Miloslav Vlk | Archbishop of Prague; 13 February 2010 – 13 May 2022 | Succeeded by Jan Graubner |
| Preceded by Aloysius Ambrozic | Cardinal-Priest of Santi Marcellino e Pietro; 18 February 2012 – 4 November 2025 | Vacant |
| Preceded by László Paskai | Spiritual Protector and Chaplain General of the Order of st. Lazarus; 14 September 2012 – 1 January 2021 | Succeeded by Antoine Kambanda |
