= Hradec Králové =

City in the Czech Republic

- Statutory city
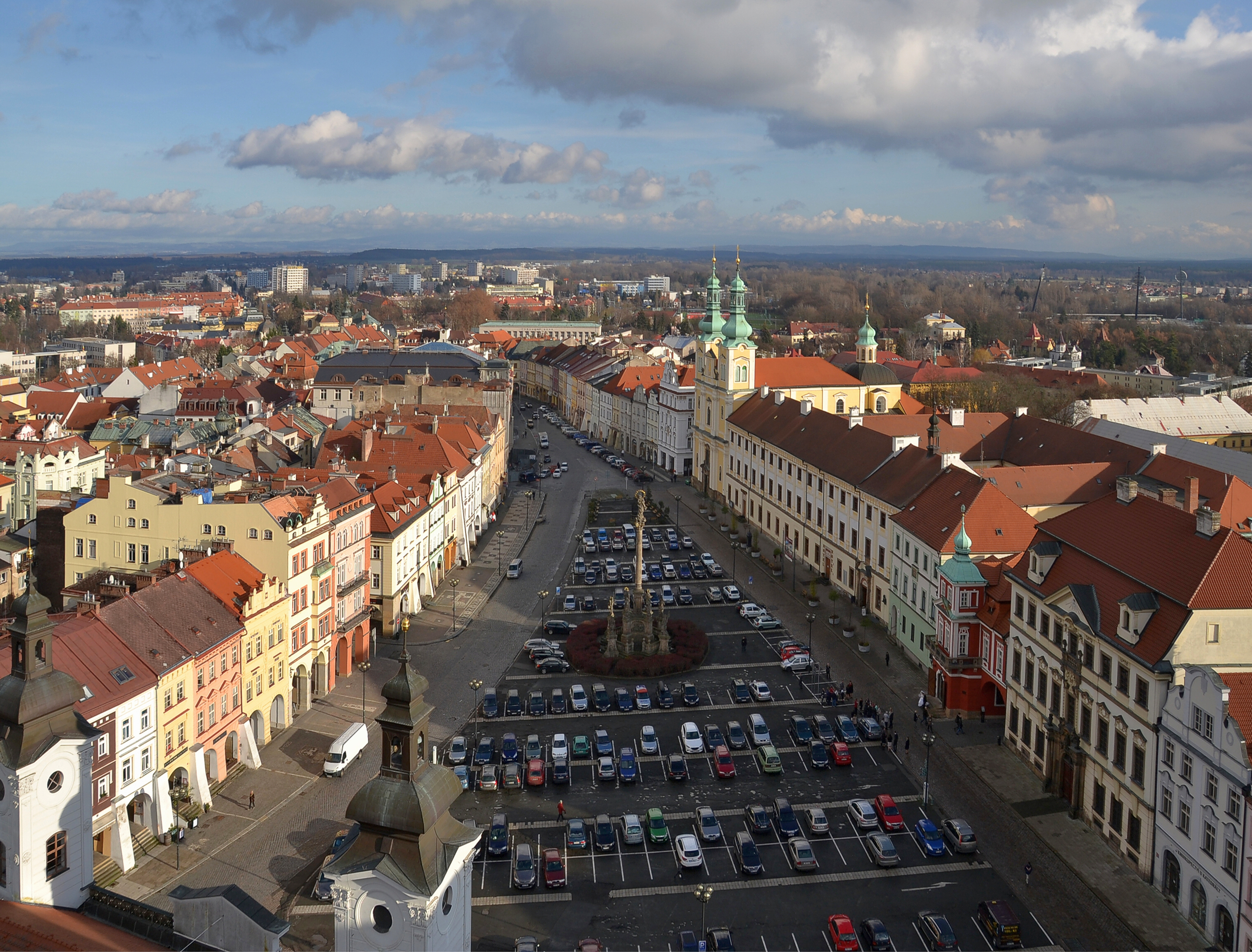
- Velké náměstí, the historic centre

- Flag Coat of arms

- Location in the Czech Republic
- Coordinates: 50°12′33″N 15°49′56″E
- Country: Czech Republic
- Region: Hradec Králové
- District: Hradec Králové
- First mentioned: 1091

Government
  - Mayor: Pavlína Springerová (HDK)

Area
  - Total: 105.69 km^{2} (40.81 sq mi)
- Elevation: 235 m (771 ft)

Population (2026-01-01)
  - Total: 93,534
  - Density: 884.98/km^{2} (2,292.1/sq mi)
- Time zone: UTC+1 (CET)
  - Summer (DST): UTC+2 (CEST)
- Postal code: 500 XX, 503 XX
- Website: www.hradeckralove.org

Hradec Králové (Czech pronunciation: [ˈɦradɛts ˈkraːlovɛː]; German: Königgrätz) is a city in the Czech Republic. It has about 94,000 inhabitants and is the capital of the Hradec Králové Region. The city is situated in a flat landscape, at the confluence of the Elbe and Orlice rivers.

From 1306, Hradec Králové was a dowry town ruled by Bohemian queens, which helped further development of the city. In the second half of the 18th century, a large military fortress was built in the city, which changed its character. In the first third of the 20th century, after the fortress was abolished, the city was rebuilt again and became appreciated for its high architectural level.

Hradec Králové is a regional centre of culture and education, known for the Klicpera Theatre and University of Hradec Králové. The historic centre of Hradec Králové is well preserved and is protected as an urban monument reservation, and the wider centre is protected as an urban monument zone. The most important monument of Hradec Králové is the Cathedral of the Holy Spirit.

== Administrative division ==
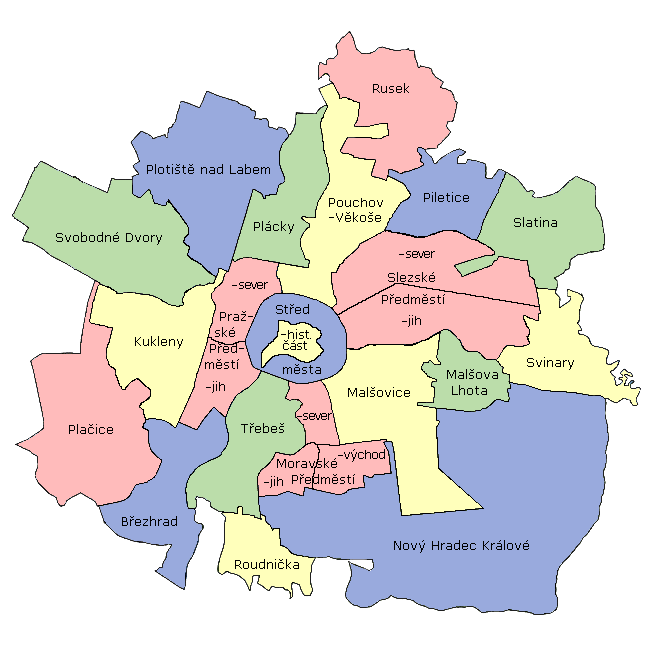
Municipal parts of Hradec Králové

Hradec Králové consists of 21 municipal parts (in brackets population according to the 2021 census):

- Březhrad (899)
- Hradec Králové (14,782)
- Kukleny (2,617)
- Malšova Lhota (869)
- Malšovice (2,557)
- Moravské Předměstí (4,966)
- Nový Hradec Králové (22,458)
- Piletice (186)
- Plácky (1,108)
- Plačice (737)
- Plotiště nad Labem (2,087)
- Pouchov (2,007)
- Pražské Předměstí (13,045)
- Roudnička (873)
- Rusek (411)
- Slatina (742)
- Slezské Předměstí (8,948)
- Svinary (1,064)
- Svobodné Dvory (2,632)
- Třebeš (7,225)
- Věkoše (2,436)

== Etymology ==
The city was originally named Hradec, which is a diminutive of hrad (i.e. 'castle'). Later, when it was owned by Bohemian queens, the Králové suffix (genitive of králová, 'queen' in Old Czech) was added. So the name Hradec Králové literally means "queen's castle".

== Geography ==
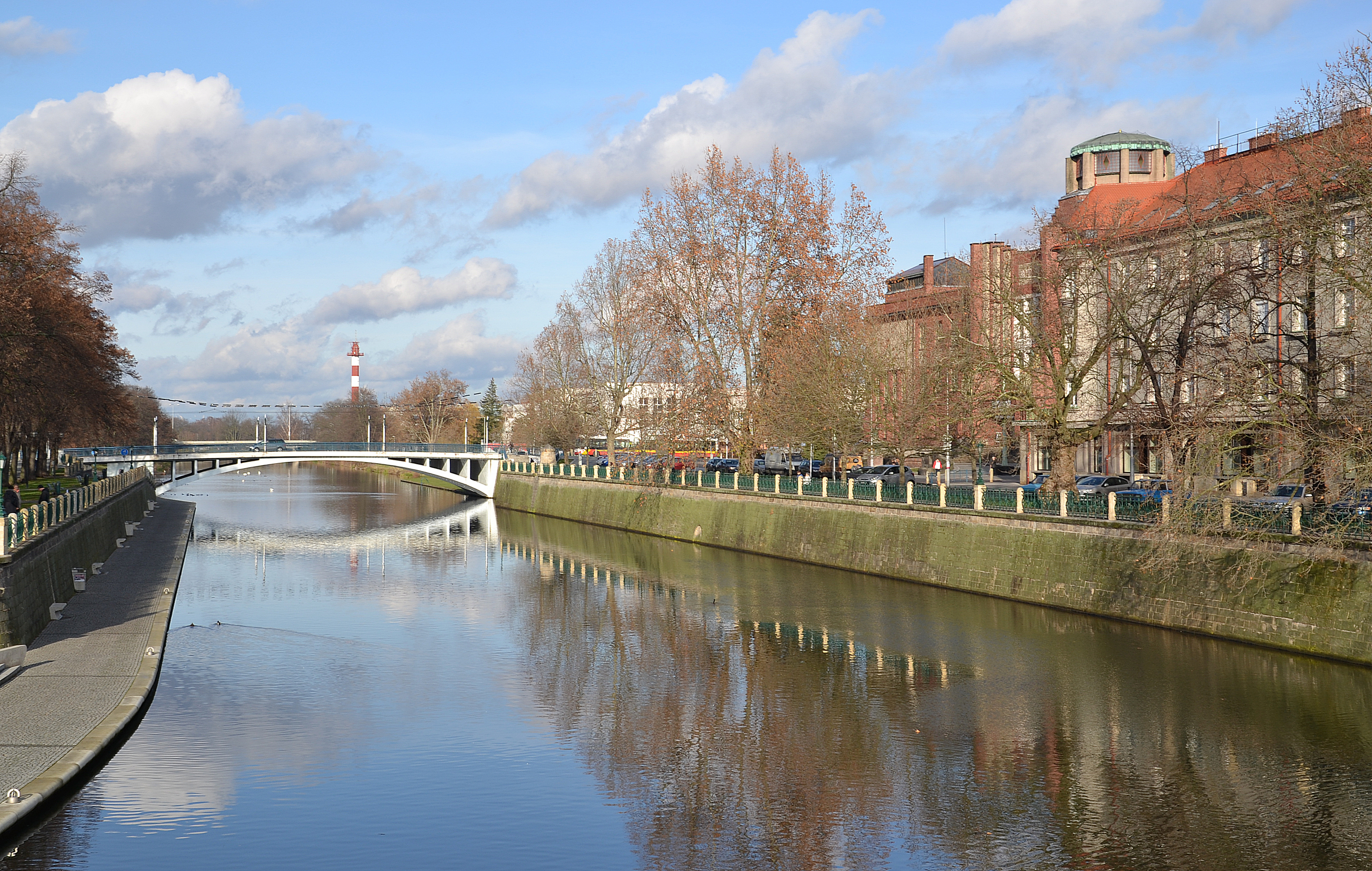
The Elbe running through the city

Hradec Králové is located about 95 kilometres (59 mi) east of Prague and forms an agglomeration with the city of Pardubice, which is located about 19 kilometres (12 mi) south of Hradec Králové. It lies in the East Elbe Table, in the eastern part of the Polabí lowlands. The highest point is the hill Slatina at 281 m (922 ft) above sea level. The city is situated at the confluence of the Elbe and Orlice rivers. The municipal territory is rich in small fishponds.

=== Climate ===
Hradec Králové has a humid continental climate (Köppen: Dfb; Trewartha: Dcbo). The annual average temperature is 9.6 °C (49.3 °F), the hottest month is July when it averages 19.8 °C (67.6 °F), and the coldest month is January when it averages −0.6 °C (30.9 °F). The annual precipitation is 587.6 millimetres (23.13 in), of which July is the wettest with 85.4 millimetres (3.36 in), while February is the driest with only 29.0 millimetres (1.14 in). The extreme temperature throughout the year ranged from −28.4 °C (−19.1 °F) on 10 February 1956 to 38.0 °C (100.4 °F) on 2 August 1934.

Climate data for Hradec Králové-Nový Hradec Králové (1991−2020 normals, extremes 1932–present)
Month	Jan	Feb	Mar	Apr	May	Jun	Jul	Aug	Sep	Oct	Nov	Dec	Year
Record high °C (°F)	16.8 (62.2)	18.4 (65.1)	23.2 (73.8)	30.3 (86.5)	33.9 (93.0)	37.6 (99.7)	37.8 (100.0)	38.0 (100.4)	34.5 (94.1)	28.1 (82.6)	20.5 (68.9)	16.3 (61.3)	38.0 (100.4)
Mean daily maximum °C (°F)	2.2 (36.0)	4.4 (39.9)	9.2 (48.6)	15.9 (60.6)	20.5 (68.9)	23.8 (74.8)	25.9 (78.6)	25.9 (78.6)	20.3 (68.5)	14.0 (57.2)	7.6 (45.7)	3.0 (37.4)	14.4 (57.9)
Daily mean °C (°F)	−0.6 (30.9)	0.7 (33.3)	4.4 (39.9)	9.9 (49.8)	14.6 (58.3)	18.1 (64.6)	19.8 (67.6)	19.5 (67.1)	14.5 (58.1)	9.3 (48.7)	4.6 (40.3)	0.5 (32.9)	9.6 (49.3)
Mean daily minimum °C (°F)	−3.4 (25.9)	−2.6 (27.3)	0.2 (32.4)	4.4 (39.9)	8.8 (47.8)	12.3 (54.1)	14.0 (57.2)	13.7 (56.7)	9.7 (49.5)	5.6 (42.1)	1.9 (35.4)	−1.9 (28.6)	5.2 (41.4)
Record low °C (°F)	−28.0 (−18.4)	−28.4 (−19.1)	−20.4 (−4.7)	−7.1 (19.2)	−5.4 (22.3)	0.1 (32.2)	3.8 (38.8)	2.9 (37.2)	−2.4 (27.7)	−7.5 (18.5)	−15.9 (3.4)	−25.2 (−13.4)	−28.4 (−19.1)
Average precipitation mm (inches)	37.1 (1.46)	29.0 (1.14)	39.5 (1.56)	30.9 (1.22)	65.0 (2.56)	67.6 (2.66)	85.4 (3.36)	68.9 (2.71)	48.2 (1.90)	40.3 (1.59)	36.5 (1.44)	39.2 (1.54)	587.6 (23.13)
Average snowfall cm (inches)	13.7 (5.4)	11.6 (4.6)	5.2 (2.0)	0.5 (0.2)	0.0 (0.0)	0.0 (0.0)	0.0 (0.0)	0.0 (0.0)	0.0 (0.0)	0.0 (0.0)	3.0 (1.2)	9.8 (3.9)	43.7 (17.2)
Average relative humidity (%)	84.1	79.1	73.5	65.5	66.7	67.3	67.4	68.1	74.8	80.7	85.2	85.9	74.8
Mean monthly sunshine hours	56.4	80.7	131.6	195.9	236.6	238.0	244.7	241.6	172.3	112.1	53.4	44.9	1,808.3
Source: Czech Hydrometeorological Institute

== History ==
=== 11th–16th centuries ===
The first written mention of a castle named Hradec is in Chronica Boemorum written in 1119–1125, when the record of the castle is associated with the year 1091. The document from 1073 that mentioned Hradec is a forgery from the 12th century. The first written mention of the settlement of Hradec is from 1225 and it was already referred to as a city. In 1306, Hradec became a dowry town ruled by Bohemian queens. It was the residence of Elizabeth Richeza of Poland in 1308–1318 or Elizabeth of Pomerania in 1378–1393. In the 14th century, thanks to the presence of the queens, the city became a military and political centre of a region with a high level of education and culture.

Extensive fires in 1290, 1339 and 1407 accelerated the reconstruction of the city. In 1420, during the Hussite Wars, the city was conquered by the Hussites and became their military centre. In 1423, the Hussites completely destroyed the castle where the queens used to live. During the rule of King George of Poděbrady, the city experienced a new period of economic, political and cultural prosperity.

The development ended in 1547, when Hradec Králové joined the campaign against Emperor Ferdinand I, and as a result many of its properties were confiscated and its privileges were taken away. The city did not recover economically until the end of the 16th century. At this time, the houses were rebuilt in the Renaissance style.

=== 17th–18th centuries ===
Map of the city in c. 1772

Hradec Králové was hit hard by the Thirty Years' War. It was conquered by the Swedish army in 1639 and several more times in the following years. At the end of the war, the city was depopulated and almost destroyed. However, the city recovered and in the 17th and early 18th century acquired a Baroque character. During the War of the Austrian Succession, the city was again involved in the war due to its strategic location.

In 1766, Emperor Joseph II decided to build a large modern military fortress in the city. Its construction changed the character of the city and its surroundings, some suburbs were demolished and the inhabitants moved into newly established settlements. A nearby hill was dismantled to build the massive walls and the riverbed of both the Elbe and the Orlice were changed. A complete defense infrastructure was built inside the walls. The fortress was finished in 1789 and occupied 320 hectares (790 acres), but during its existence, it was never used in the war.

=== 19th–20th centuries ===
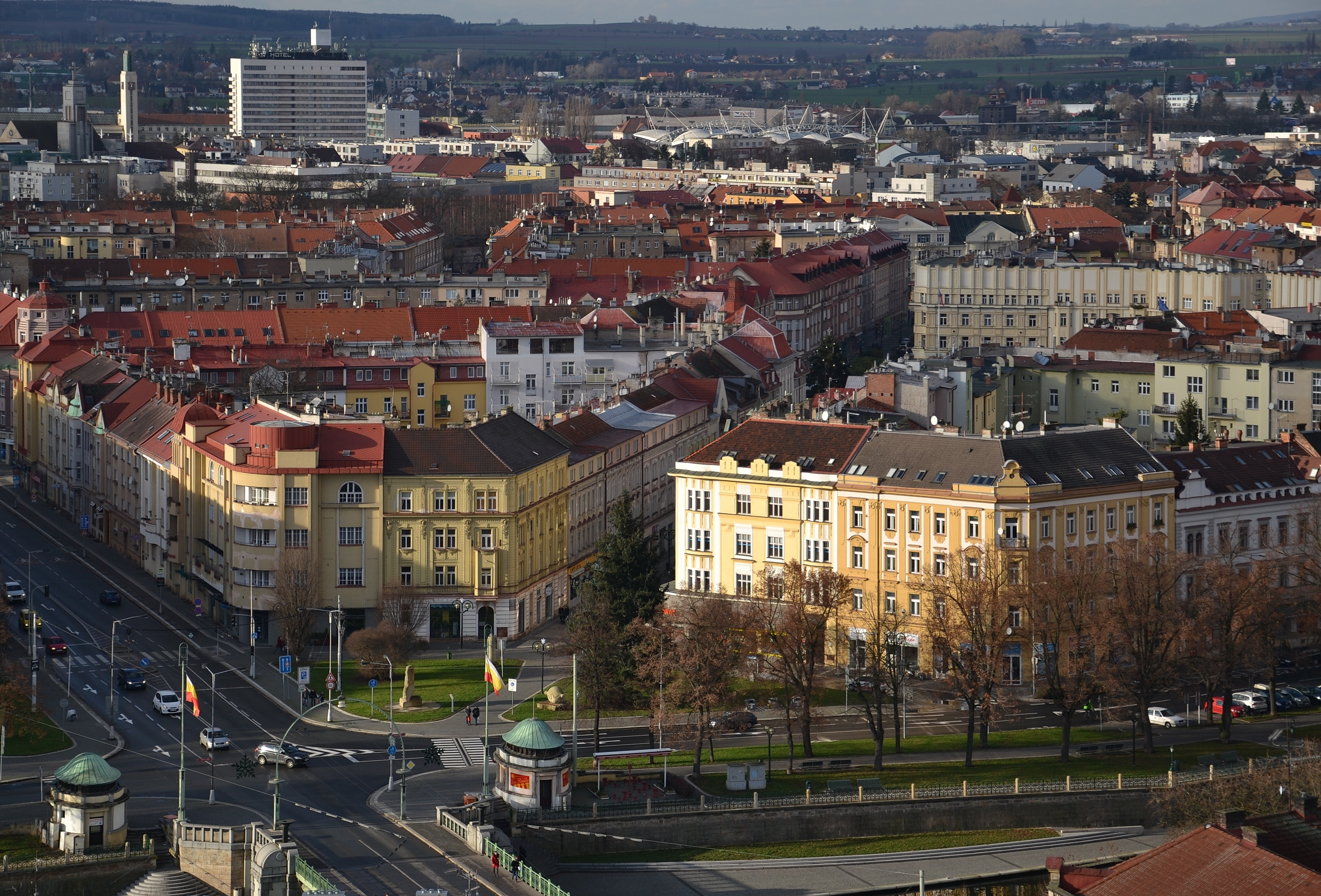
General view

In the mid-19th century, the industrialisation began and several industrial enterprises were founded inside the fortifications. The Battle of Königgrätz, the decisive battle of the Austro-Prussian War, took place on 3 July 1866 near Hradec Králové. This event is commemorated in the famous "Königgrätzer Marsch". Moreover, the battle put an end to the age of fortifications. The fortress was formally abolished in 1884 and gradually demolished between 1893 and 1914. The last remnants were demolished between 1929 and 1930.

In 1884, a then-unique international competition for the city's regulatory plan was announced. In the 1890s, several representative buildings (monastery, synagogue, high school, etc.) were built. Before World War I, the development of the city and its high architectural level were influenced especially by the architect Jan Kotěra. In the 1920s, his pupil, another prominent Czech architect Josef Gočár, became the leading figure in the city's development, and his regulatory plan created in 1926–1928 became the basis for the construction activity in the years to come. The urban development of Hradec Králové in the 1920s and 1930s was also appreciated abroad and the city was nicknamed the "Salon of the Republic".

== Demographics ==
According to the estimates, population of Hradec Králové exceeded 100,000 in the period 1987–1997 and peaked at the end of 1990 with 101,272 inhabitants. However, during the censuses, the population never exceeded 100,000. The entire Hradec Králové-Pardubice agglomeration has a total population of about 350,000.

Historical population

Year	Pop.	±%
1869	18,884	—
1880	24,230	+28.3%
1890	25,236	+4.2%
1900	29,310	+16.1%
1910	35,675	+21.7%

Year	Pop.	±%
1921	39,151	+9.7%
1930	50,137	+28.1%
1950	57,118	+13.9%
1961	66,608	+16.6%
1970	80,463	+20.8%

Year	Pop.	±%
1980	96,145	+19.5%
1991	99,917	+3.9%
2001	97,155	−2.8%
2011	94,314	−2.9%
2021	92,649	−1.8%

Source: Censuses

== Economy ==
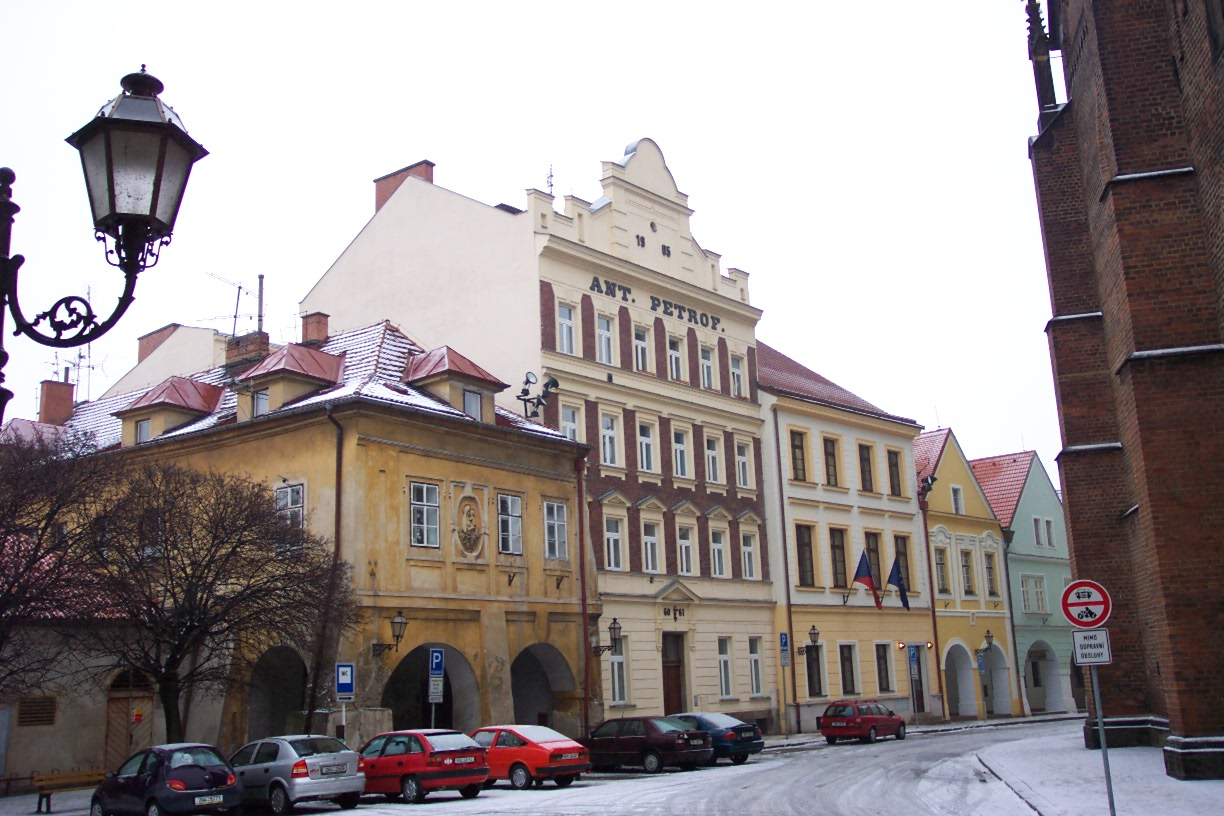
Former seat of the Petrof company

The largest industrial employers with headquarters in the city are ARROW International, a manufacturer of medical instruments and technology owned by Teleflex, and Trelleborg Bohemia, which focuses on the production of rubber and rubber products.

A traditional industry is musical instrument manufacturing. Hradec Králové is known for the Petrof piano manufacturer, founded in 1864.

The largest non-industrial employer is the University Hospital Hradec Králové.

== Transport ==
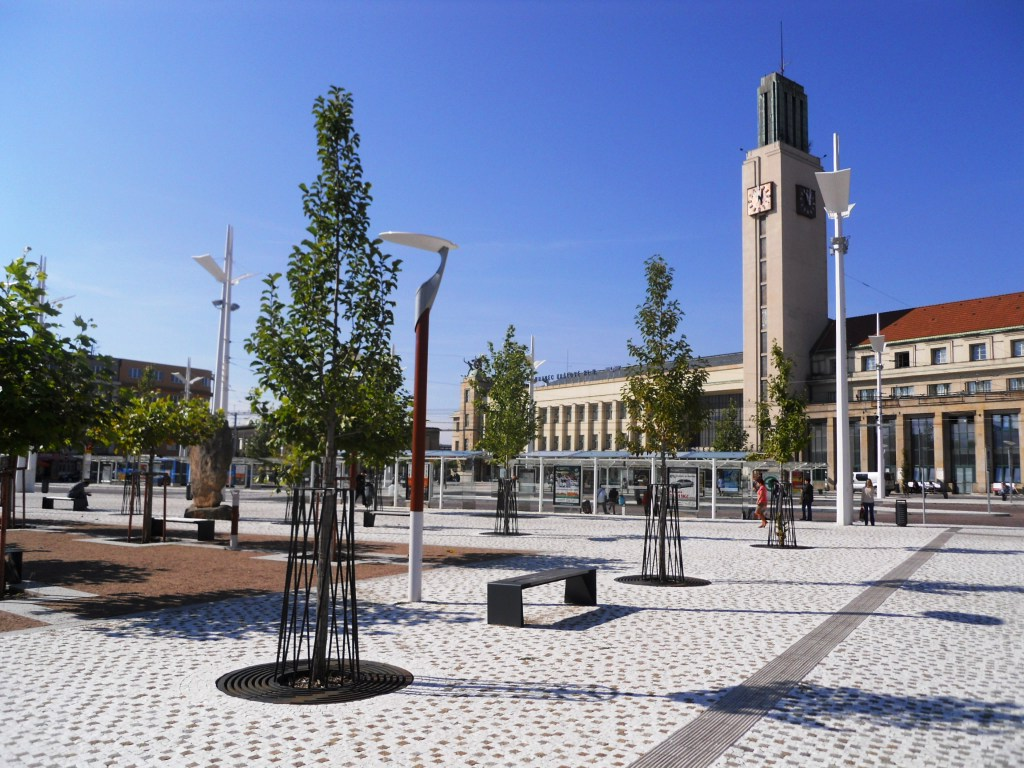
Riegrovo náměstí with the main railway station

Hradec Králové is connected with Prague by the D11 motorway, which runs along the western municipal border. Three main roads cross the city centre: the I/11 (which connects the D11 motorway with Šumperk and continues to Ostrava), the I/35 (from Liberec to Mohelnice, further continuing to Olomouc as the D35 motorway) and the I/37 (which connects Hradec Králové with Pardubice).

The city is located on the intraregional railway lines Pardubice–Liberec and Prague–Trutnov. The municipal territory is served by five train stations and stops: Hradec Králové hlavní nádraží (main station), Hradec Králové zastávka, Hradec Králové-Kukleny, Hradec Králové-Slezské Předměstí and Plotiště nad Labem.

Hradec Králové is served by the Hradec Králové Airport. It is a public domestic and private international airport, located about 3 km (2 mi) from the city centre.

Intra-city transport is provided by the company Dopravní podnik města Hradce Králové, a.s., which is owned by the city of Hradec Králové. In addition to buses, trolleybuses also provide intra-city transport. Trolleybus service was started in 1949. There are eight trolleybus lines in operation.

== Education ==
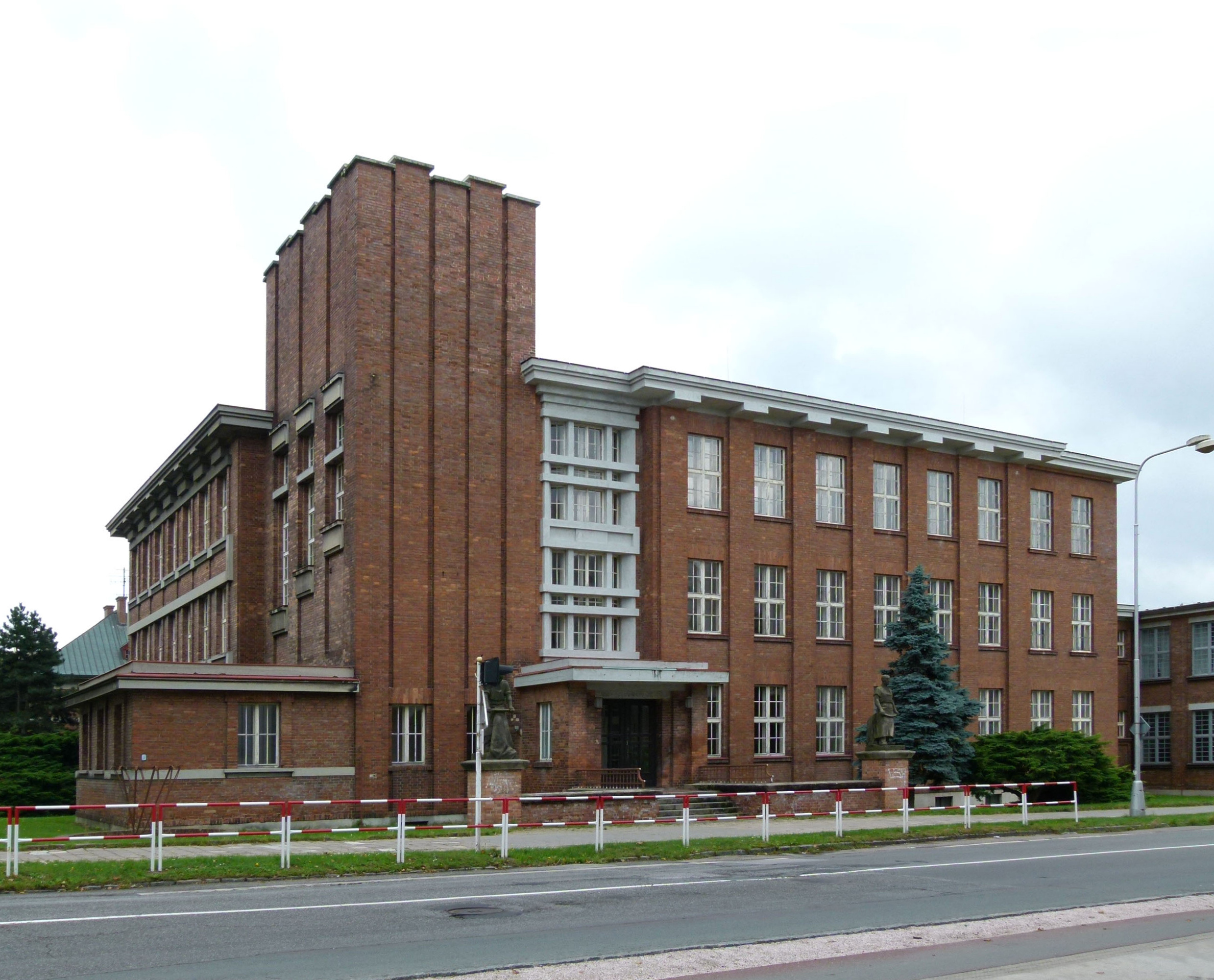
Former tanner high school designed by J. Gočár

Hradec Králové serves as the educational centre of the region. The first school was founded here in 1362. Today the University of Hradec Králové, established in 2000, is located in the city. Charles University in Prague has two faculties in Hradec Králové: Faculty of Medicine and Faculty of Pharmacy. The University of Defense in Brno has its Faculty of Military Medicine in Hradec Králové.

== Culture ==
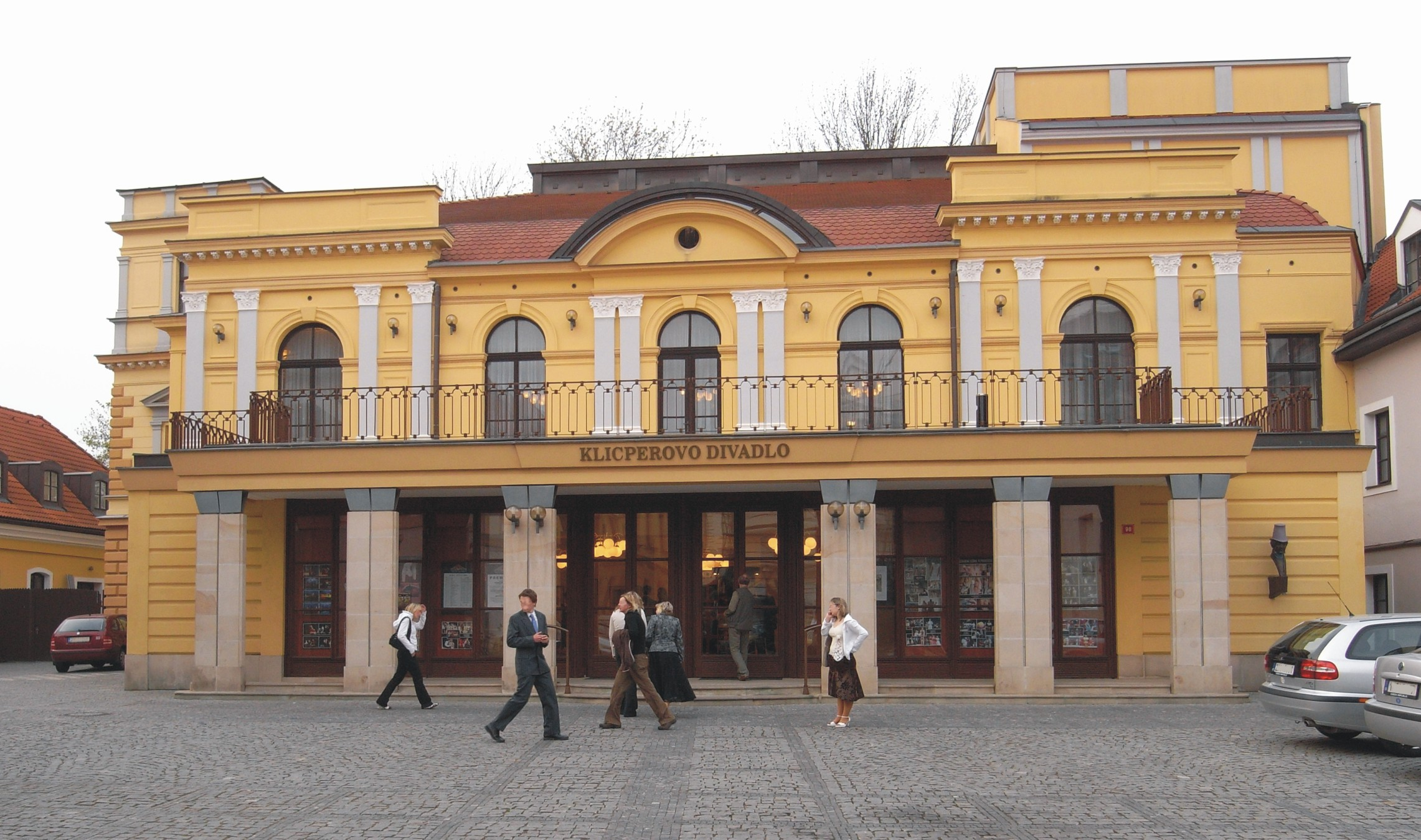
Klicpera Theatre

Hradec Králové has a strong theatrical tradition. The Klicpera Theatre is considered one of the best drama theatres in the country and is a four-time winner of the Czech "Theatre of the Year" award. The Drak Theatre is a professional puppet theatre founded in 1958. Since the 1970s, the theatre has performed all over the world, collaborated with foreign stages, and won awards at many festivals.

The REGIONS International Theatre Festival Hradec Králové is an annual cultural event held in the city. It is one of the largest theatrical showcases in the country. It was founded in 1995 by the Klicpera Theatre.

Jazz Goes to Town is an international jazz festival, which has been held in Hradec Králové every October since 1995. Since 2003 the city hosts Hip Hop Kemp. It is the biggest hip hop festival in Central and Eastern Europe. Since 2007 the city hosts Rock for People, the biggest rock festival and one of the largest open-air music festivals in the Czech Republic.

The city is home to one of the Czech Republic's leading orchestras, the Hradec Králové Philharmonic Orchestra. It was established in 1978.

The Gallery of Modern Art in Hradec Králové is an art gallery in Hradec Králové. It was founded in 1919.

== Religion ==
Hradec Králové is the seat of the Diocese of Hradec Králové, established in 1664.

== Sport ==
The football club FC Hradec Králové plays in the Czech First League in the Malšovická aréna stadium with a capacity of 9,300 people.

The ice hockey club of Hradec Králové is Mountfield HK, which plays in the Czech Extraliga.

The women's basketball team, Hradecké Lvice, plays in the national women basketball league.

A motorcycle speedway track existed in Svobodné Dvory from 1951 until the mid-1960s. The track hosted a team called Východočeský KV Hradec Králové, which won two bronze medals in the Czechoslovak Championship in 1961 and 1962.

== Sights ==
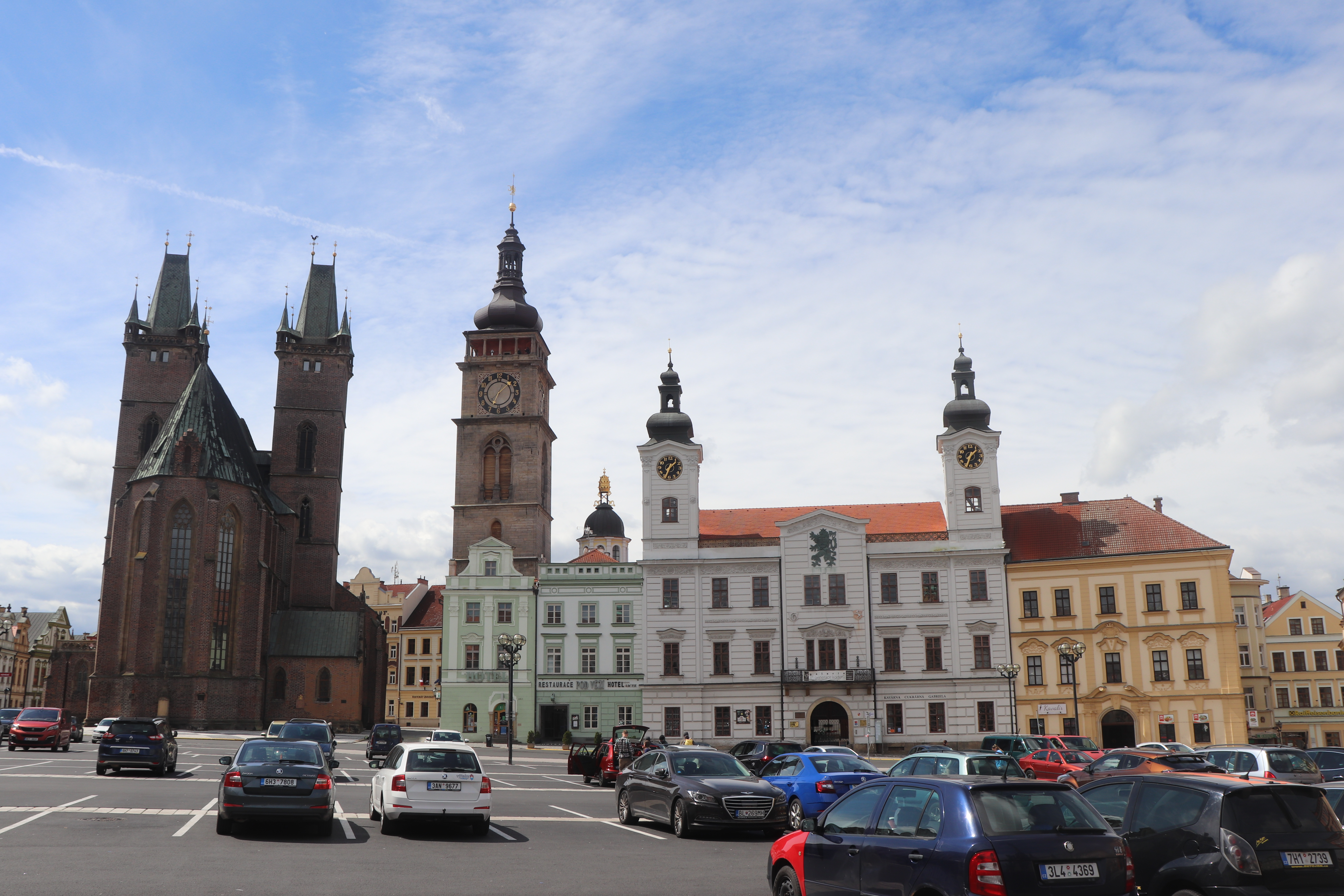
Cathedral of the Holy Spirit, White Tower and former city hall

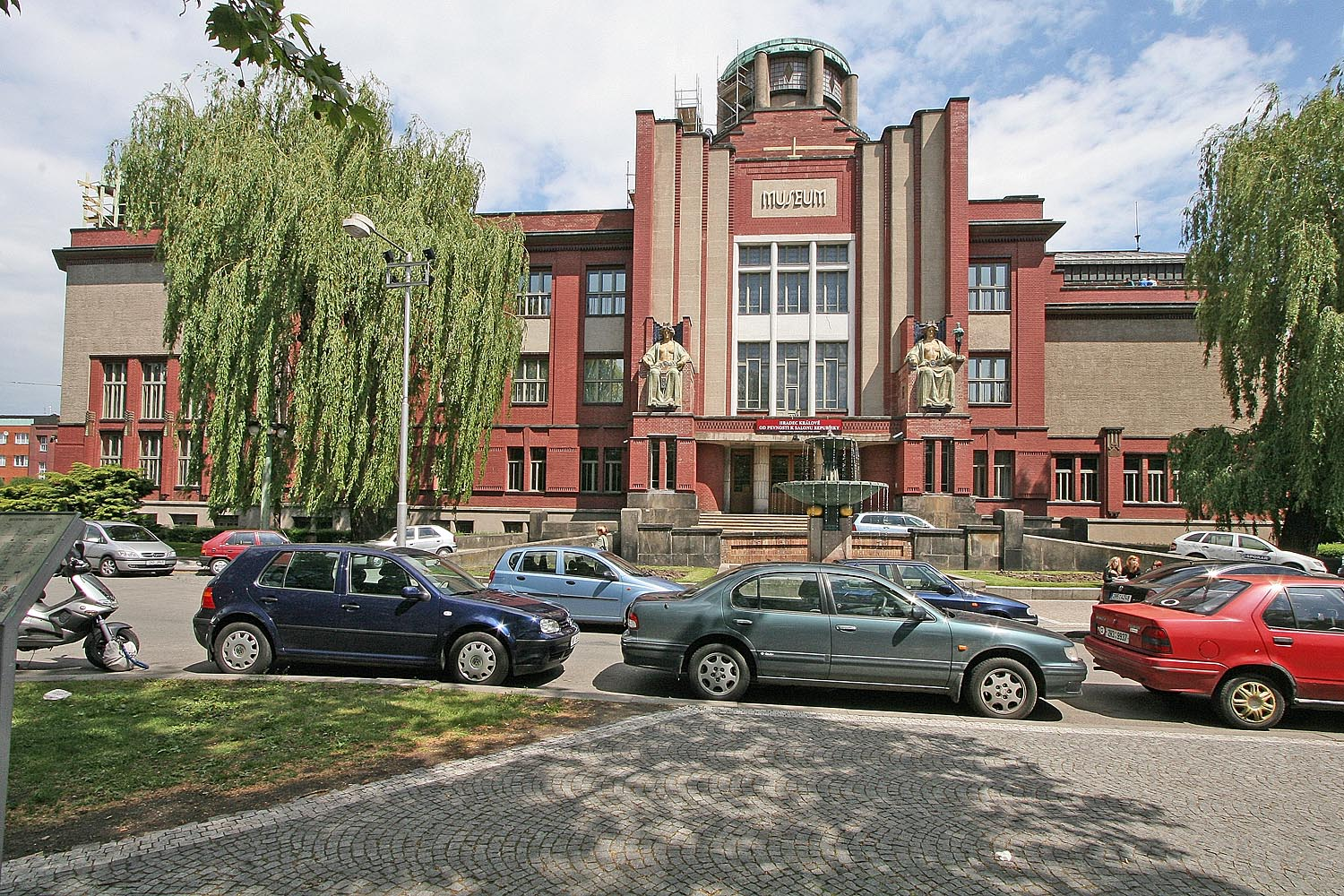
Museum of Eastern Bohemia

The historic city centre is located around the square Velké náměstí, where all the most valuable historic buildings are located. The face of the modern city dates from the end of the 19th and the first half of the 20th century, when many monumental representative buildings in the Art Nouveau and Functionalism styles were built here.

The main landmark of Hradec Králové and the most important monument is the Cathedral of the Holy Spirit. The Church of the Holy Spirit was founded by Elizabeth Richeza in 1307, the two massive towers were added in 1360. It was promoted to a cathedral by Pope Alexander VII in 1664. It is the only Gothic church, which survived the construction of the fortress in the 18th century.

The second landmark and the tallest building in the city with 72 metres (236 ft) is the White Tower. The originally Renaissance bell tower was built in 1574–1580 and completed in 1589. It includes the third biggest bell in Bohemia. Today the tower serves as a lookout tower and space for exhibitions.

The Church of Saint John of Nepomuk was built on the site of the former castle in 1710–1729. The interior contains valuable paintings from 1887, created in the Beuron Art School style.

The Museum of Eastern Bohemia in Hradec Králové was founded in 1880. The large museum building was designed by architect Jan Kotěra and built in 1909–1912. The museum has approximately 3,000,000 items in archaeological, scientific and historical collections. One of the most valuable exhibits is the oldest surviving collections of Czech Renaissance polyphony, the Codex Speciálník manuscript.

== Notable people ==
- Elizabeth of Pomerania (c. 1347 – 1393), queen; lived and died here
- Jan Šindel (1370s – c. 1456), scientist and professor
- Cyprián Karásek Lvovický (1514–1574), astronomer and mathematician
- Bohuslav Balbín (1621–1688), writer, historian and geographer
- Václav Kliment Klicpera (1792–1859), playwright; lived and worked here
- Carl von Rokitansky (1804–1878), physiologist, pathologist
- Antonín Petrof (1839–1915), piano maker
- František Plesnivý (1845–1918), architect
- Viktor Mucha (1877–1933), dermatologist
- Josef Gočár (1880–1945), architect
- Josef Čapek (1887–1945), painter, writer and poet
- Otakar Vávra (1911–2011), film director
- Avigdor Dagan (1912–2006), Israeli diplomat
- Jiří Horák (1924–2003), politician
- Václav Snítil (1928–2015), violinist
- Jiří Petr (1931–2014), agroscientist, Rector Emeritus of CZU
- Dominik Duka (1943–2025), prelate of the Catholic Church
- Dušan Salfický (born 1972), ice hockey player
- Vít Jedlička (born 1983), politician and publicist
- Kateřina Siniaková (born 1996), tennis player, Olympic winner
- Filip Hronek (born 1997), ice hockey player

== Twin towns – sister cities ==
Hradec Králové is twinned with:

- Alessandria, Italy
- Arnhem, Netherlands
- Banská Bystrica, Slovakia
- Chernihiv, Ukraine
- Giessen, Germany
- Kaštela, Croatia
- Metz, France
- Wałbrzych, Poland
- Wrocław, Poland

=== Cooperation agreements ===
Hradec Králové also cooperates with:

- Montana, Bulgaria
- Székesfehérvár, Hungary

== See also ==
- New Hradec, North Dakota
