= Jan Vokál =

Czech Roman Catholic bishop

His Excellency Jan Vokál
- Bishop, Diocese of Hradec Králové
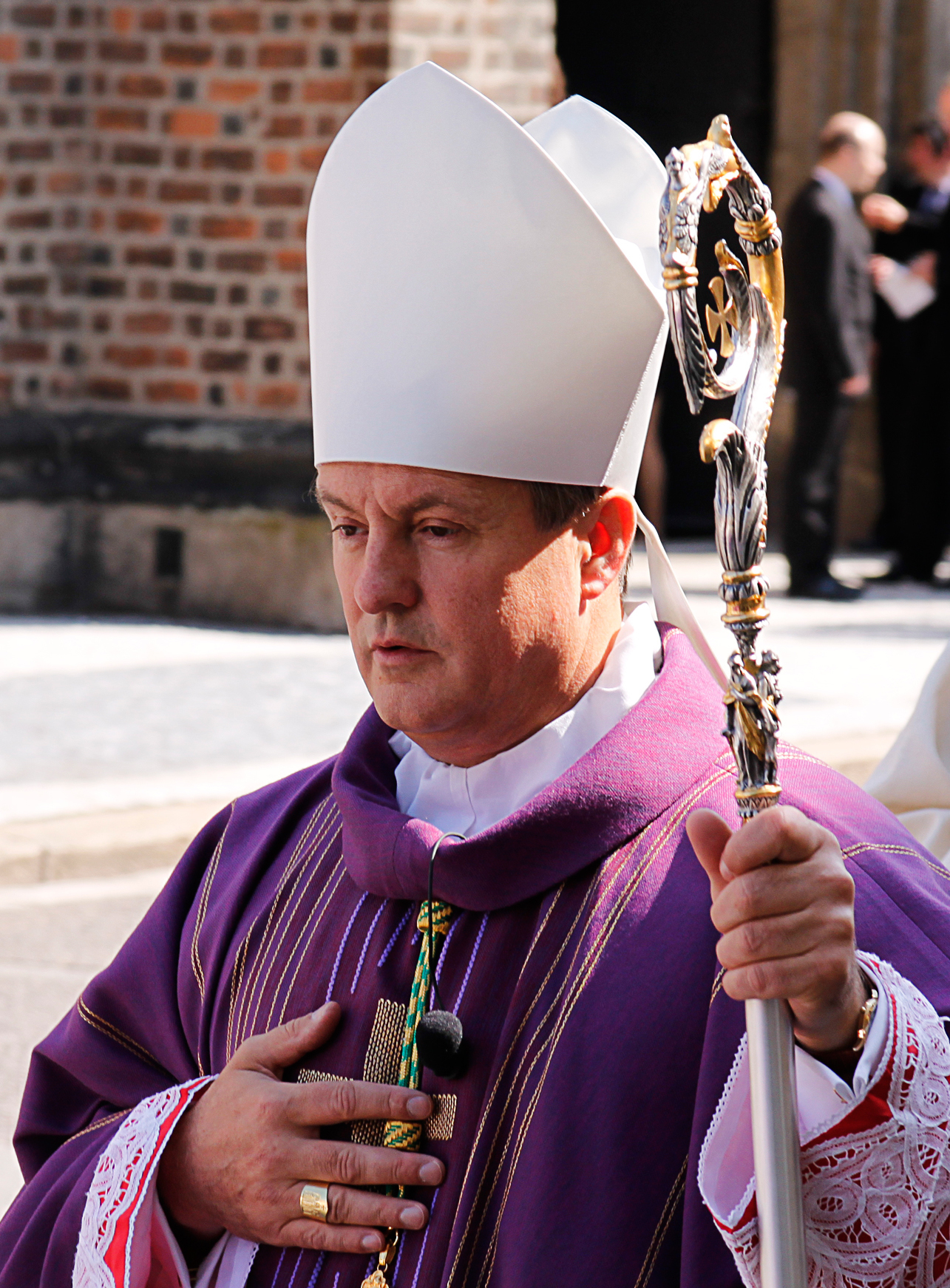
- Vokál in 2011
- Church: Roman Catholic
- Province: Bohemian
- Metropolis: Prague
- Diocese: Hradec Králové
- Installed: 2011
- Predecessor: Dominik Duka

Orders
- Ordination: 28 May 1989
- Consecration: 7 May 2011

Personal details
- Born: 25 September 1958 (age 67) Hlinsko, Czechoslovakia (Present day Czech Republic)
- Motto: Sub tuum præsidium
- Coat of arms

Styles of Jan Vokál
- Reference style: The Most Reverend
- Spoken style: Your Excellency
- Religious style: Bishop
- Posthumous style: not applicable

Jan Vokal (born 25 September 1958) is the current Bishop of Hradec Králové since his installation on 14 May 2011. He had previously served as an official in the Secretariat of State.

Vokál was born in 1958 at Hlinsko (Pardubice Region). He earned a degree in Engineering Cybernetics at the Technical University in Prague. In 1983 he was admitted to the College of Saint John Nepomuk in Rome and studied philosophy and theology at the Pontifical Lateran University.

He was ordained a priest 28 May 1989 for the diocese of Hradec Králové. He continued his education in the United States at St. Thomas University and worked as assistant priest in the Diocese of Peoria, in the United States. In 1991 he began his service at the Secretariat of State (Section for General Affairs). From 1992 to 2005 he was personal secretary of Cardinal Corrado Bafile, Prefect of the Congregation for the Causes of Saints.

In 2008 he obtained a doctorate in utroque iure, i.e. in both civil and canon law, from the Pontifical Lateran University and in the following year a doctorate in civil law at the Charles University in Prague. In 2005 he was appointed a coadjutor canon of the Chapter of the Basilica di Santa Maria Maggiore.

He was appointed to Hradec Králové by Pope Benedict XVI on 3 March 2011, consecrated a bishop on 7 May, and installed on 14 May.
