= Codex Speciálník =

15th-century Bohemian songbook

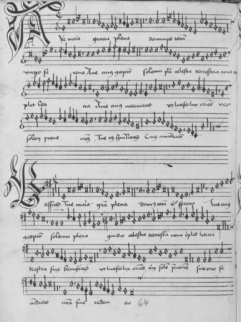
Beginning of Josquin des Prez's Ave Maria (p.64)

The Speciálník Codex is a 15th-century speciálník (i.e. special songbook) originating from a monastery in the region of Prague and one of the most important early collections of Bohemian music.

Its eclectic mix of Medieval and Renaissance a cappella sacred music is matched only by its brilliant juxtapositions of well-known and obscure pieces and composers. Containing works for two, three, and four voices, the Codex is one of the oldest surviving collections of Czech Renaissance polyphony, and originated in the Utraquist Protestant congregations of around 1500. The manuscript's repertory has close ties to the court of Emperor Frederick III and the ducal court in Milan.

The manuscript is in the Library of the Museum of Eastern Boehmia (formerly Regional Museum Library) of Hradec Králové with shelfmark MS II.A.7. (RISM siglum: CZ-HKm MS II.A.7). The museum acquired it from a Prague antique dealer in 1901.
