= Czech Bishops' Conference =

Catholic governing body

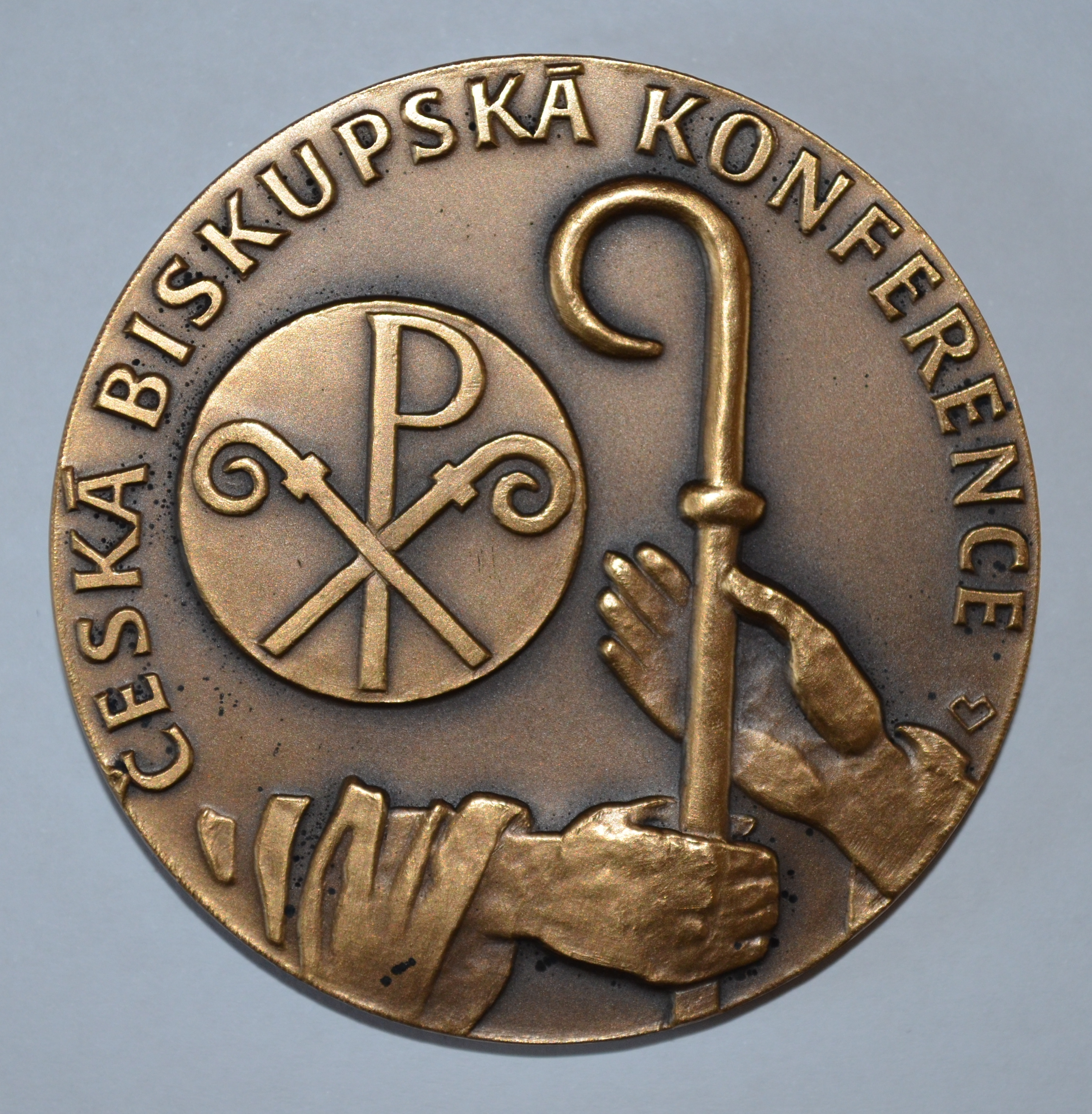
The medal of the conference

The Czech Bishops' Conference (CBC) (Czech: Česká biskupská konference) is the standing episcopal conference of the Catholic bishops of the Czech Republic. Based in Prague, the CBC represents the Catholic Church in the Czech Republic. It was founded in early 1993, the date of independence for the Czech Republic, as the successor to the Czechoslovak Bishops' Conference. Members of the Bishops' Conference according to canon 447 CIC: in conjunction perform pastoral duties in favor of the Christians in their territory, to achieve the greater good which the Church gives to people according to law, especially apostolic actions suitably adapted to the time and place. The Episcopal Church of the conference is a legal entity run by the Apostolic See, its character and activities are governed by the 1983 Code of Canon Law, specifically canons 447–459. Members of the Czech Bishops' Conference are diocesan bishops of Latin Church and Eastern Catholic Churches, and position them on an equal footing with auxiliary bishops and other titular bishops both within or outside for the Czech Republic and perform specific tasks under a mandate from the Holy See or the Czech Bishops' Conference.

== Presidents ==
- Miloslav Vlk, Cardinal Archbishop of Prague (1993–2000)
- Jan Graubner, Archbishop of Olomouc (2000–2010)
- Dominik Duka, Cardinal Archbishop of Prague (2010–2020)
- Jan Graubner, Archbishop of Olomouc, Archbishop of Prague (2020–2025)
- Josef Nuzík, Archbishop of Olomouc (from 2025)

== Speaker ==
The CBC speaker function is traditionally filled by a person who is not a member. In this capacity, he succeeded Daniel Herman, Martin Horalek, Miloslav Fiala, Irene Sargánková. Sometimes mentioned as a spokesman for the employee of the press center CBK Gračko George, in whose purview the website management, translation and editing of foreign news.

== Collective bodies ==
Czech Bishops' Conference has the following authorities:

- Permanent Council: five-member executive body; in 2022 it was composed of:
  - Chairman Jan Graubner
  - Vice Chairman Jan Vokál
  - General Secretary of the ČBK Stanislav Přibyl
  - bishop Jan Baxant of Litoměřice
  - bishop Martin David
- General Secretariat
- Economic Council
- Commission established to the specific objectives: their mission is a mandate to prepare material for plenum CBC, Delegates-bishops, bishops authority to specific tasks, which can compile each delegate expert advice.

The February 2010 CBK had seven expert committees:

1. For the Doctrine of the Faith (4 members, Chairman Zdeněk Wasserbauer)
2. For the liturgy (4 members, Chairman Martin David)
3. For the priesthood (4 members, Chairman Pavel Konzbul)
4. For Catholic Education (3 members, Chairman Tomáš Holub, each member is the chairman of one section)
5. Economics and law (4 members, Chairman Tomáš Holub)
6. Joint committee of ČBK and KVŘP (3 members, including bishop Martin David)

The July 2022 provisions were bishops, delegates and experts advising for the following areas:

- Media (Bishop-delegate Jan Baxant)
- Laymen a movements (Vlastimil Kročil)
- Family (Josef Nuzík)
- Youth (Pavel Posád)
- Healthcare (Josef Nuzík)
- Spiritual service in the army, prisons, police and firefighters (Zdeněk Wasserbauer)
- Expatriates (Václav Malý)
- Ecumenism (Tomáš Holub)
- Iustitia et Pax (Justice and Peace), minorities and migrants (Václav Malý)
- Mission and new evangelization (Jan Graubner)
- Culture and heritage (Antonín Basler)
- Information technology (Vlastimil Kročil)
- Cooperation with the Commission of the Bishops Conference of the EU (COMECE) (Jan Vokál)
- Nepomucenum (Czech seminary in Rome) (Jan Vokál)
- Eucharistic congresses (Jan Vokál)
- Care of creation (Antonín Basler)
- Czech Catholic Biblical Work (Zdeněk Wasserbauer)
- Charity and social services (Jan Graubner)

The head of the Bishops' Conference Secretariat Secretary General, member of the CBC. He shall be responsible to the Secretary, Executive Secretary, press center and professional sections. In February 2010, the Secretariat had specialized sections: Translation, economic, legal, religious education, catechesis, youth and pastoral-evangelistic.

== Established legal entity ==
CBC is the administrator of other legal entities:

- National Center for Family
- St. Egidio Community
- Work of Mary (Focolare Movement) - male part
- Work of Mary (Focolare Movement) - female part
- The St. Vincent de Paul in the Czech Republic
- Mothers Prayers - a movement of Christian Mothers
- Caritas Czech Republic
- Czech Catholic Biblical Work
- Beatitudes community in the Czech Republic
- Fatima apostolate in the Czech Republic

== Former members ==
- Antonín Liška (from inception to the year 2003)
- Jaroslav Škarvada (from inception to the year 2010)
- Josef Koukl (from inception to the year 2010)
- Karel Otčenášek (from inception to the year 2011)
- Jiří Paďour, OFM Cap (from 1996 to the year 2015)
- Cardinal Miloslav Vlk (member since inception, in 1993-2000 chairman, deceased)
- František Lobkowicz (from creation, deceased)

== Roman Catholic bishops ==
- Jan Graubner (member since inception, in the years 2000–2010 chairman)
- Cardinal Dominik Duka (member since 1998, chairman since 2010)
- František Radkovský (since inception)
- Vojtěch Cikrle (since inception)
- Josef Hrdlička (since inception)
- Josef Kajnek (since inception)
- Václav Malý (since 1997)
- Petr Esterka (since 1999)
- Karel Herbst (2002)
- Pavel Posád (since 2004)
- Jan Baxant (since 2008)
- Jan Vokál (since 2011)
- Vlastimil Kročil (since 2015)
- Tomáš Holub (since 2016)
- Pavel Konzbul (since 2016)

== Greek-Catholic bishops ==
- Ladislav Hučko (since 2003)
- Ján Eugen Kočiš (2004–2019)

== See also ==
- Catholic Church in the Czech Republic
