= Stanislav Přibyl =

Czech Catholic bishop (born 1971)

His Excellency, The Most Reverend Monsignor Stanislav Přibyl CSsR
- Archbishop of Prague
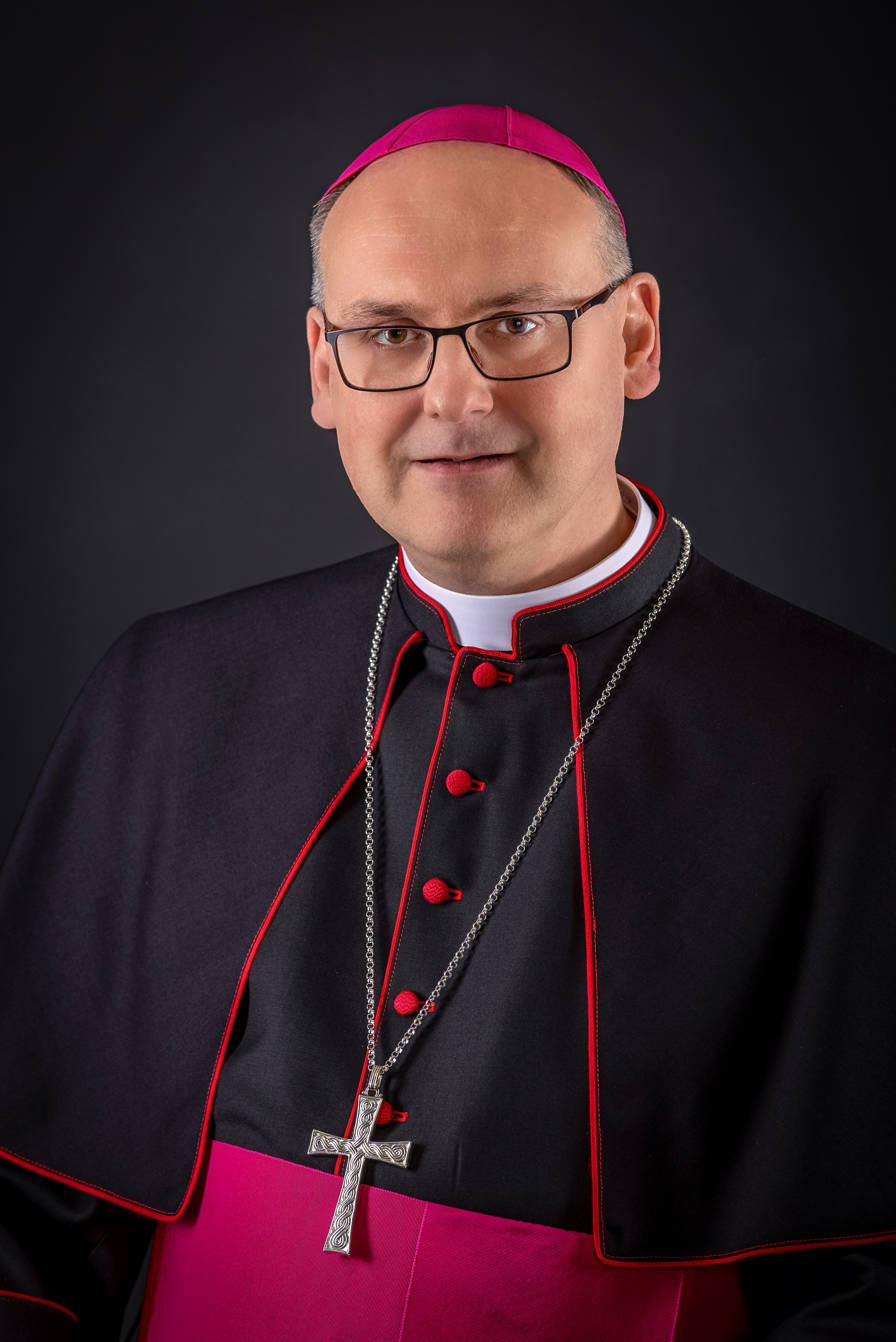
- Přibyl in 2024
- Church: Catholic
- Archdiocese: Prague
- Appointed: 2 February 2026
- Predecessor: Jan Graubner
- Other posts: Vice president, Czech Bishops Conference (2025-)
- Previous post: Bishop of Litoměřice (2024-2026)

Orders
- Ordination: 22 June 1996 by Miloslav Vlk
- Consecration: 2 March 2024 by Jan Graubner

Personal details
- Born: 16 November 1971 (age 54) Prague, Czechoslovakia
- Denomination: Catholicism
- Education: Catholic Theological Faculty of Charles University; Faculty of Social Economics of Jan Evangelista Purkyně University in Ústí nad Labem; Faculty of Arts of Charles University
- Motto: Pax vobis (Latin for 'Peace be with you')
- Coat of arms

Stanislav Přibyl, C.Ss.R. (born 16 November 1971) is a Czech Catholic prelate who has served as the Archbishop of Prague since 25 April 2026. He was bishop of Litoměřice from 2024 to 2026. He is a member of the Congregation of the Most Holy Redeemer (Redemptorists).

== Biography ==
=== Early years ===
Stanislav Přibyl was born on 16 November 1971 in the Strašnice district of Prague, Czechoslovakia, the older of two sons born to Ludmila and Stanislav Přibyl. After studying at the Secondary Technical School of Surveying in Hrdlořezy and playing the organ from 1985 to 1990 in Prague churches, he spent the year 1990/91 at the seminary in Lubaszowa, Poland, and then took his vows as a member of the Redemptorists. He studied at the Catholic Theological Faculty of Charles University from 1991 to 1996, while also completing his formation at the Prague seminary.

Přibyl was ordained a priest for the Redemptorists on 22 June 1996 in the Cathedral of St. Vitus by Cardinal Miloslav Vlk. He served at the Marian pilgrimage shrine of Svatá Hora (Holy Mountain) as vicar from 1996 to 1999 and then as parish priest from 1999 to 2008. From 2004 to 2008 he was president of Caritas for the archdiocese, and in 2008 he became a member of the archdiocesan priests council. From 2002 to 2012, he led his order's Prague province. He earned his licentiate in theology in 2012 and his doctorate in theology in 2014, both from Charles University's Catholic Theology Faculty. In 2019, he received his master's degree in finance and management from the Faculty of Social Economics of Jan Evangelista Purkyně University in Ústí nad Labem. In 2025, he received a doctorate in art history from the Faculty of Arts of Charles University. He was vicar general of the Diocese of Litoměřice from 2009 to 2016, and from 2016 to 2024 he was general secretary of the Czech Bishops Conference, serving as its spokesman. From 2014 to 2023, he was administrator of the parishes in Horní Police, Jezvé, and Žandov. In 2021, he was appointed rector of the monastery church of Our Lady of Perpetual Help in Malá Strana (Prague).

In January 2021, as general secretary of the Bishops Conference, he joined in signing a statement denouncing anti-vaccination protestors who wore yellow stars of David while protesting government support of COVID vaccination. It said that appropriating that symbol of the Holocaust represented "a cheap, calculating cynicism that has exceeded all conceivable bounds".

=== Episcopal career ===
Přibyl was appointed bishop of Litoměřice by Pope Francis on 23 December 2023. He was consecrated a bishop on 2 March 2024 at the Cathedral of St. Stephen in Litoměřice by Jan Graubner, Archbishop of Prague, assisted by Gregor Maria Hanke, Bishop of Eichstätt, and Jan Baxant, the retiring bishop of Litoměřice.

On 31 December 2025, he declared 2026 a year of reconciliation marking the 80th anniversary of the post-World War II expulsion of ethnic Germans from the Sudetenland region that falls within the jurisdiction of the Diocese of Litoměřice. When assigned to Prague, he cited as his most important work in Litoměřice as ethnic reconciliation and opening dialogue with academic institutions and a variety of political and social organizations.

Pope Leo XIV appointed him archbishop of Prague on 2 February 2026, to which he was appointed on 25 April. He is the youngest to hold the position since Pavel Huyn in 1916 at the age of 48.

He has served as vice president of the Czech Episcopal Conference since 29 April 2025. He holds many other positions within that Conference, including: vice-chair of the permanent council; chair of the Commission for Prevention and Protection from Abuse; member of the Commissions for the Doctrine of the Faith and the Commission for Liturgy; delegate to the Council for COMECE, the Council for Culture and Monuments, and the Council for the Media and the Catholic Weekly. He also teaches pastoral theology at the Faculty of Theology, Charles University, where as archbishop he will be grand chancellor of an institution where, he noted, there is "great tension" between two groups of faculty. He also serves on the Board of Trustees of the Technical University of Liberec.

On 29 June 2026, Přibyl received the pallium from Pope Leo XIV at the Vatican.
