= Jan Baxant =

21st-century Czech Catholic bishop

Mgr. Jan Baxant
- Bishop of Litoměřice
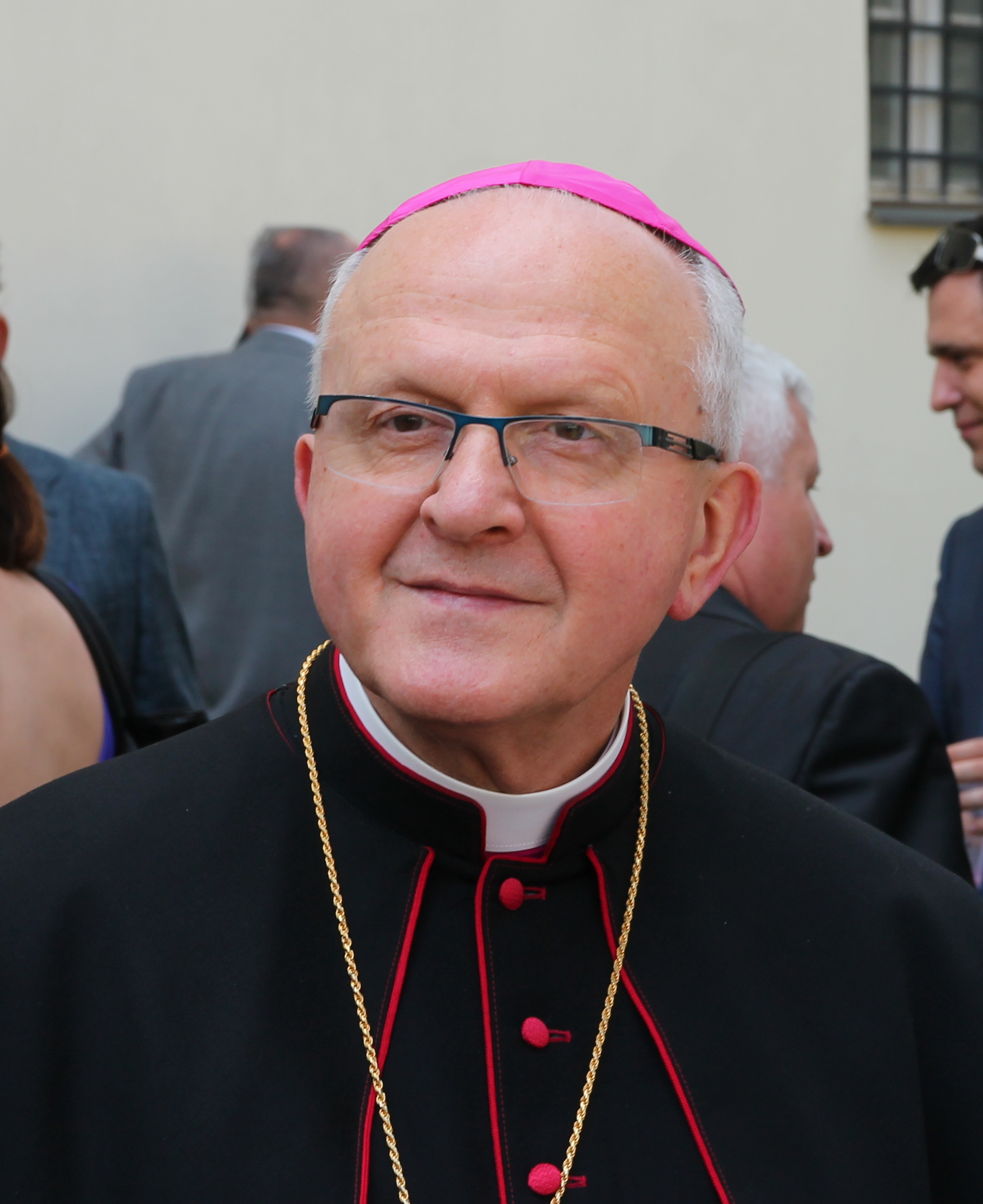
- Baxant in 2018
- Church: Roman Catholic Church
- Archdiocese: Archdiocese of Prague
- Diocese: Litoměřice
- In office: 2008 –
- Predecessor: Dominik Duka O.P.

Orders
- Ordination: 23 June 1973 by František Tomášek
- Consecration: 22 November 2008 by Miloslav Vlk
- Rank: Archbishop

Personal details
- Born: 8 October 1948 (age 77) Karlovy Vary, Czechoslovakia
- Motto: Ut videam (Let Me See)
- Coat of arms

Jan Baxant (born 8 October 1948) is a Czech Roman Catholic bishop, being the leader of the Roman Catholic Diocese of Litoměřice since 2008.

== Biography ==
=== Early life ===
Baxant was born in a large Catholic family and has five siblings, two sisters and three brothers. Two of his siblings have also joined consecrated life, his brother Pavel is a Catholic priest and his sister Marie is a nun.

He graduated from the Secondary Technical School of Surveying in Prague and later from the Cyril and Methodius Theological Faculty in Litoměřice. He was ordained priest on 23 June 1973 by František Tomášek. In addition to Czech, Baxant speaks German, French, Italian and Russian.

=== Priestly ministry ===
Baxant was a parish vicar in Kolín from 1973 to 1975, he then served as administrator of the parish of Bystřice from 1975 to 1983, and then the parish at the Church of Sts. Antonín Paduánský in Prague-Holešovice from 1983 to 1990. In 1990 he became Vice-Rector, and in 1993 Rector, of the Archbishop's Seminary in Prague. On 1 January 2003 he became vicar general of the diocese of České Budějovice.

=== Ordination as bishop ===
On 4 October 2008, Pope Benedict XVI appointed him the seat of bishop of the diocese of Litoměřice. He received the episcopal consecration at the hands of Cardinal Miloslav Vlk at the St. Stephen's Cathedral in Litoměřice on 22 November 2008. The Apostolic Nuncio to the Czech Republic, Diego Causero, and the Bishop of České Budějovice, Jiří Paďour O.F.M. Cap., served as the co-consecratos.

Baxant chose his bishop's motto as the Latin phrase "Ut videam", meaning "let me see". The chosen bishop's coat of arms is a quartered shield and combines his personal coat of arms (golden sun in the second and third blue fields) and the diocesan coat of arms (red quartered heraldic cross in the first and the fourth blue field).

=== Life as Bishop ===
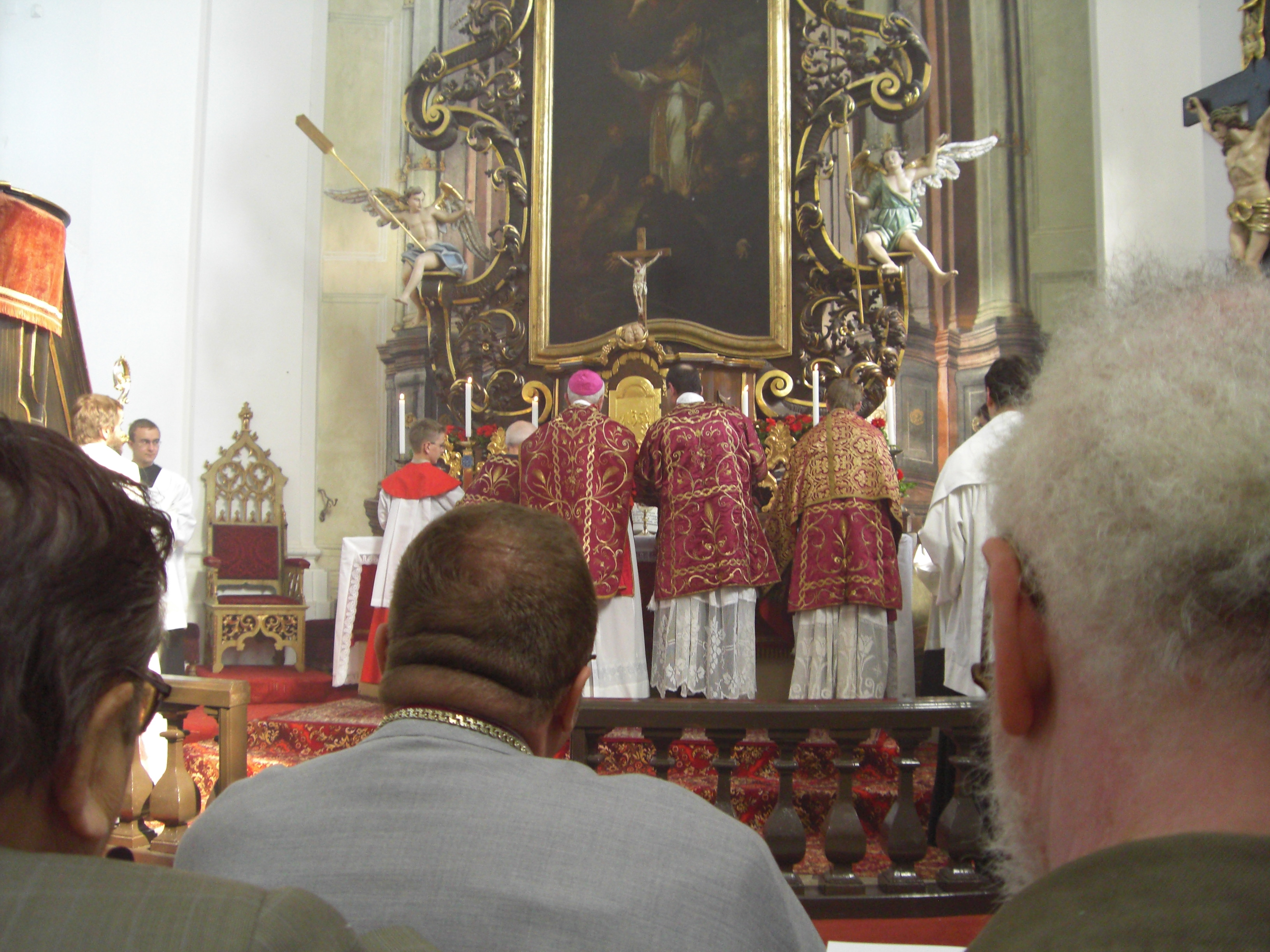
Baxant celebrating the Tridentine Mass in April 2009

Baxant is considered a conservative bishop and for a time was frequently referred to as one of the serious candidates for to become Archbishop of Prague after the retirement of Archbishop Vlk.

On 25 April 2009 Baxant celebrated the Tridentine Mass while attending a pilgrimage to honor St. Vojtech in Litoměřice District. The mass has been requested by the local spiritual administrator Jan Radim Valík OSB to be according to the missal of 1962. In the 40 years since Vatican II Baxant became the first Czech bishop to officially celebrate mass according to the pre-Vatican II tradition. Since then Baxant has periodically celebrated mass in the Tridentine form.

On 12 April 2017 Baxant was hospitalized with a heart attack. He was temporary replaced by the emeritus auxiliary bishop of Prague, Karel Herbst. By 1 June 2017 Baxant had resumed his role of bishop after recovering from the heart attack.
