= Pavel Posád =

21st-century Czech Catholic bishop

Mgr. Pavel Posád
- Auxiliary Bishop of the Diocese of České Budějovice
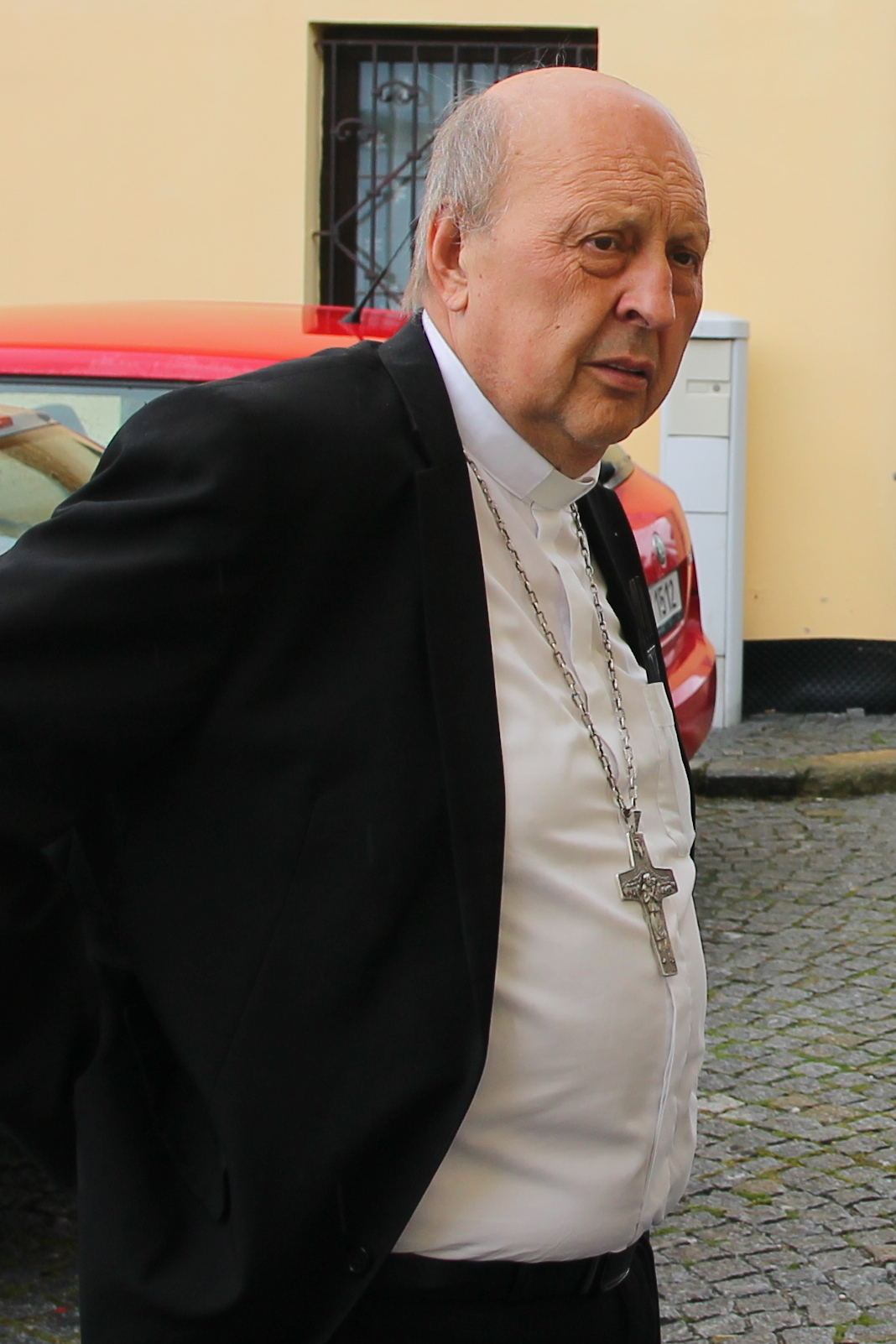
- Posád in 2008
- Church: Roman Catholic Church
- Archdiocese: Archdiocese of Prague
- Diocese: České Budějovice
- In office: 2008–
- Previous post: Bishop of Litoměřice (2004–2008)

Orders
- Ordination: 26 June 1977 by Josef Vrana
- Consecration: 28 February 2004 by Miloslav Vlk
- Rank: Bishop

Personal details
- Born: 28 June 1953 (age 73) Budkov, Czechoslovakia
- Coat of arms

Pavel Posád (born 28 June 1953) is a Czech Roman Catholic bishop, being the auxiliary bishop of the Roman Catholic Diocese of České Budějovice. Previously he was the bishop of the Roman Catholic Diocese of Litoměřice from 2004 to 2008.

== Biography ==
=== Early life ===
Posád was born in a large farming family and was one of 7 children, although one of his brothers died when he was two. He grew up in the small town of Budkov in Třebíč District.

After completing his primary school in Budkov, Posád continued his studies at the grammar school in Moravské Budějovice. After graduation in 1972, he studied at the Seminary of Cyril and Methodius in Prague. He graduated in 1977 and was ordained to the priesthood 26 June 1977 by Josef Vrana as a priest for the Diocese of Brno.

=== Priestly ministry ===
He held the priesthood for three years as a chaplain first in Pozořice, then in Brno. In 1980 he worked as a pastor in Ratíškovice. After two years, at the request of the then state administration, Posád was transferred to the border parish Drnholec. In 1989 he was appointed the spiritual administrator in Třešť.

After the fall of communism in Czechoslovakia in 1989, Posád became a parish priest at St. Thomas in Brno. After three years, he was appointed a spiritual priest of the Archbishop's Priest Seminary in Olomouc. In addition to the education of theologians, he devoted himself to the permanent formation of priests and permanent deacons of the Brno diocese. He was a member of the priesthood council for eleven years. He is a member of the committee of the Czech Bishops' Conference for the Priesthood.

=== Ordination as bishop ===
On 24 December 2003, Pope John Paul II appointed Posád the seat of bishop of the diocese of Litoměřice. He received the episcopal consecration at the hands of Cardinal Miloslav Vlk at the St. Stephen's Cathedral in Litoměřice on 28 February 2004. The Josef Koukl, served as the co-consecratos. On 26 January 2008 Posád was appointed as auxiliary bishop to diocese of České Budějovice.
