= Diocese of Litoměřice =

Roman Catholic diocese in Czechia

Coordinates: 50.5°N 14°E

Diocese of Litoměřice Dioecesis Litomericensis Diecéze Litoměřice

Catholic
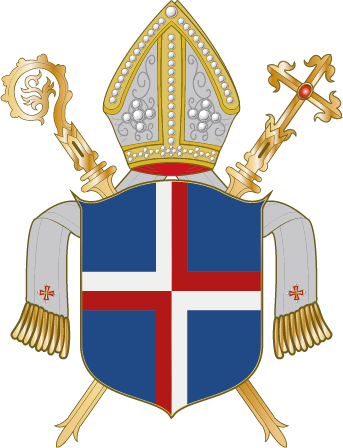

Location
- Country: Czech Republic
- Metropolitan: Prague

Statistics
- Area: 9,380 km^{2} (3,620 sq mi)
- Population: Total; Catholics: (as of 2019); 1,363,000; 161,464 (11.8%)
- Parishes: 437

Information
- Denomination: Catholic Church
- Rite: Latin Rite
- Cathedral: Katedrála sv. Štěpána (Cathedral of St. Stephen)
- Patron saint: Zdislava Berka

Current leadership
- Pope: Leo XIV
- Metropolitan Archbishop: Stanislav Přibyl
- Apostolic Administrator: Stanislav Přibyl
- Bishops emeritus: Jan Baxant

Map
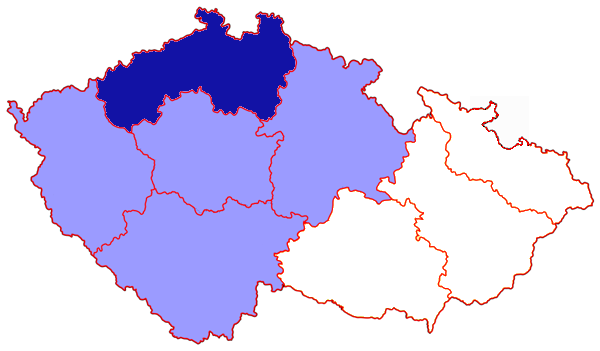
- Location of the Diocese of Litoměřice (dark blue)

Website
- dltm.cz

The Diocese of Litoměřice (Latin: Litomericensis) is a Latin diocese of the Catholic Church based in the town of Litoměřice in the Ecclesiastical Province of Prague in the Czech Republic.

== History ==
On July 3, 1655, the Diocese of Litoměřice was created out of the Metropolitan Archdiocese of Praha.

== Bishops ==
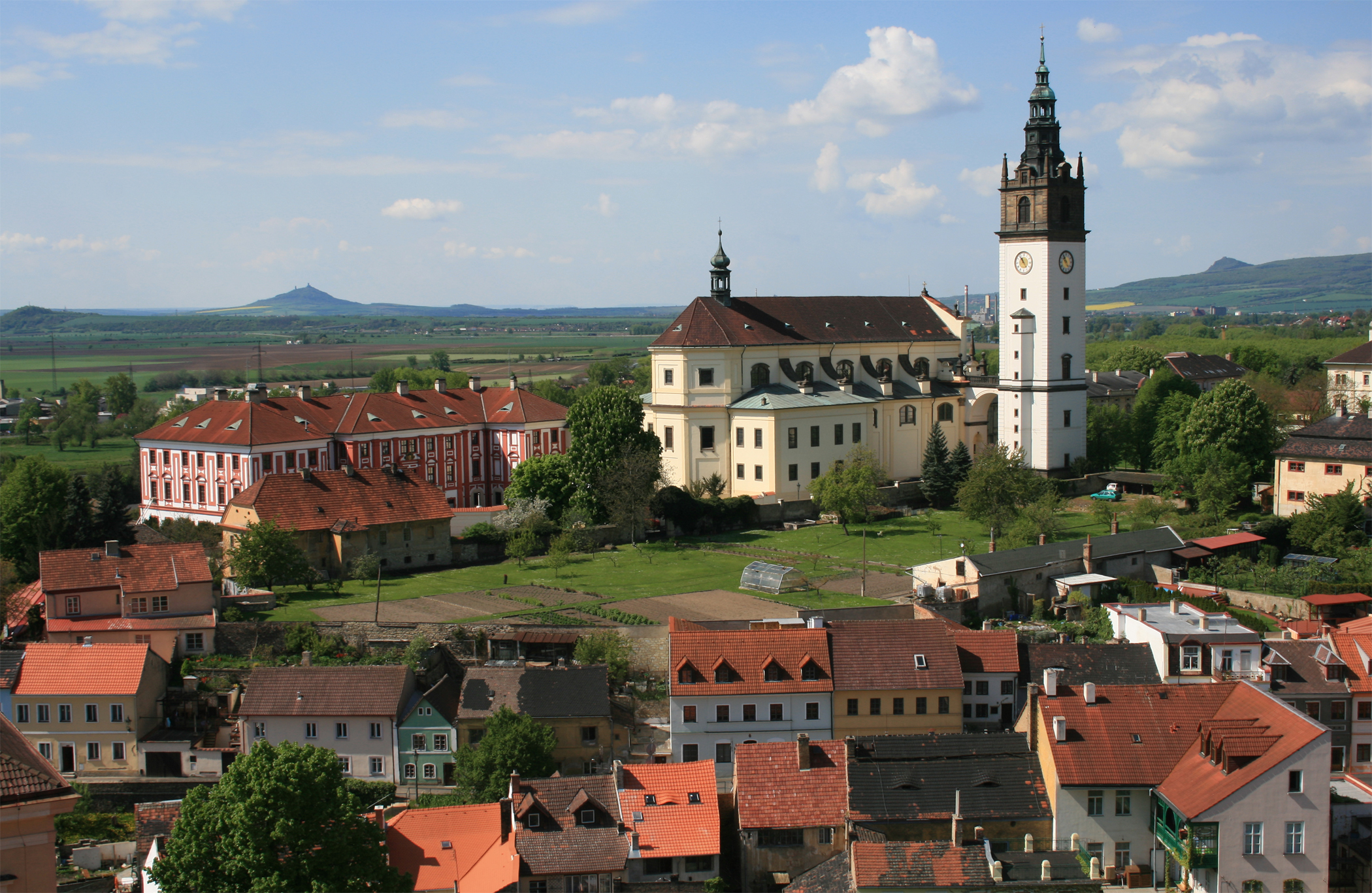
Bishop's residence and St. Stephen Cathedral in Litoměřice.

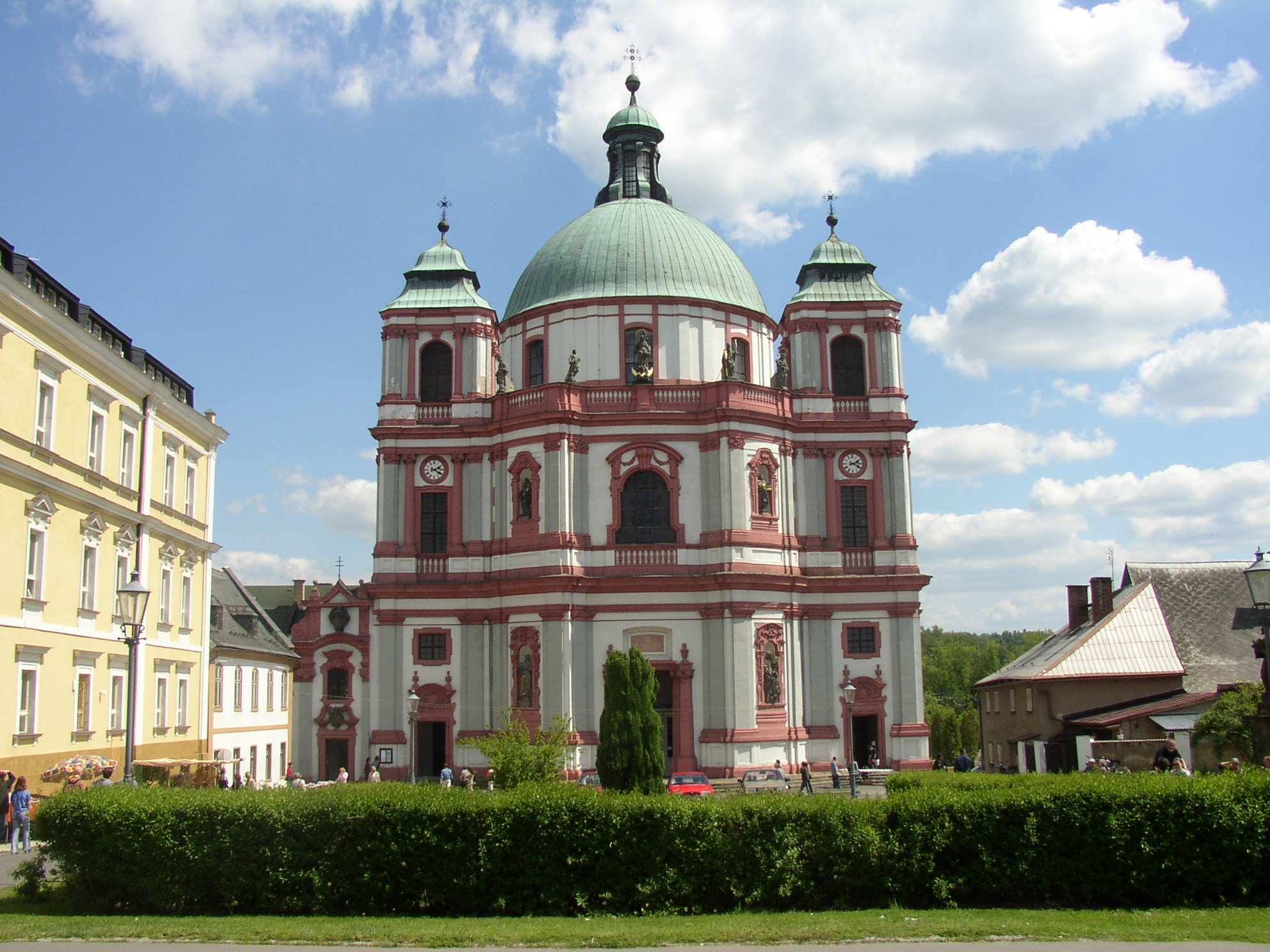
Bazilika sv. Vavřince a sv. Zdislavy ('Basilica of St. Lawrence and St. Zdislava')

- Maxmilián Rudolf Schleinitz (5 July 1655 – 13 October 1675)
- Jaroslav František Ignác von Sternberg (30 October 1675 – 12 April 1709)
- Hugo František von Königsegg-Rothenfels (6 August 1709 – 6 September 1720)
- Johann Adam Reichsgraf von Wratislaw von Mitrowitz (9 January 1721 – 2 June 1733)
- Moritz Adolf Karl Herzog von Sachsen-Zeitz (4 July 1733 – 20 June 1759)
- Emmanuel Ernst Reichsgraf von Waldstein (19 July 1759 – 7 December 1789)
- Ferdinand Kindermann (4 February 1790 – 25 May 1801)
- Václav Leopold Chlumčanský (15 October 1801 – 15 March 1815, Confirmed, Archbishop of Prague)
- Josef František Hurdálek (18 December 1815 – 28 September 1822, Retired)
- Vinzenz Eduard Milde (16 January 1823 – 19 March 1832, Confirmed, Archbishop of Vienna)
- Augustin Bartoloměj Hille (2 July 1832 – 26 April 1865)
- Augustin Pavel Wahala (8 January 1866 – 10 September 1877)
- Antonín Ludvík Frind (15 May 1879 – 18 October 1881)
- Emanuel Jan Schöbel (3 July 1882 – 28 November 1909)
- Josef Gross (20 April 1910 – 20 January 1931)
- Antonín Alois Weber (22 October 1931 – 10 March 1947, Resigned)
- Štěpán Trochta (27 September 1947 – 6 April 1974)
- Josef Koukl (26 July 1989 – 24 December 2003, Retired)
- Pavel Posád (24 December 2003 – 26 January 2008, Appointed, Auxiliary Bishop of České Budějovice)
- Dominik Duka (Apostolic administrator 6 November 2004 – 4 October 2008)
- Jan Baxant (4 October 2008 – 23 December 2023, Retired)
- Stanislav Přibyl (23 December 2023 – 2 February 2026, Appointed, Archbishop of Prague)

== Patron saints ==
Patron saints of the Diocese of Litoměřice include: Zdislava Berka (primary), Stephen, Felix and Victorinus of Pettau.

== See also ==
- Roman Catholicism in the Czech Republic

== Sources ==
- GCatholic.org
- Catholic Hierarchy
- Diocese website
