= Štěpán Trochta =

Czech Roman Catholic cardinal

His Eminence Štěpán Trochta S.D.B.
- Cardinal; Bishop of Litoměřice
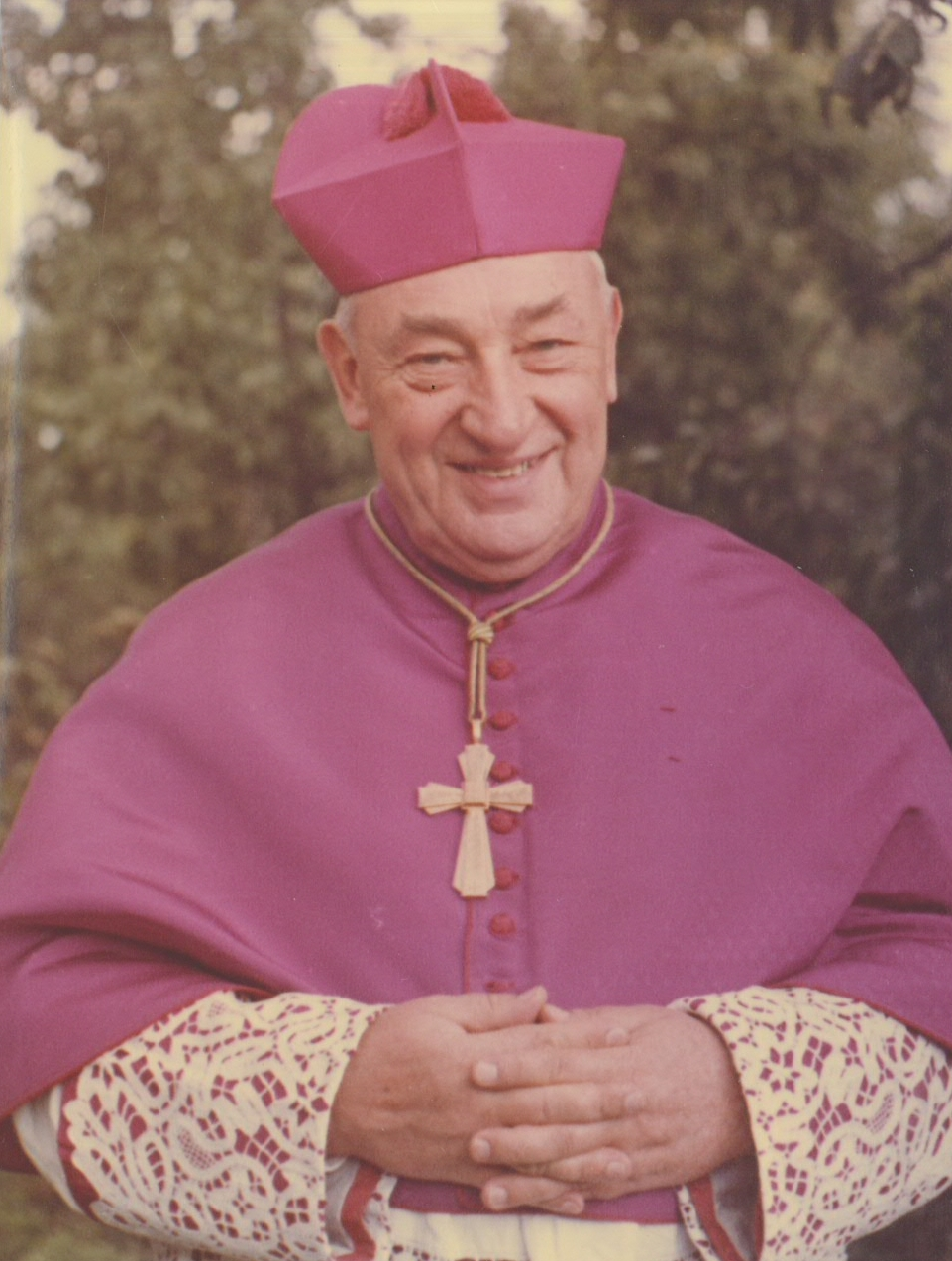
- Trochta in 1970.
- Church: Roman Catholic Church
- Diocese: Litoměřice
- See: Litoměřice
- Appointed: 27 September 1947
- Term ended: 6 April 1974
- Predecessor: Anton Alois Weber
- Successor: Josef Koukl
- Other post: Cardinal-Priest of San Giovanni Bosco in Via Tuscolana (1973-74)

Orders
- Ordination: 29 June 1932 by Maurilio Fossati
- Consecration: 16 November 1947 by Saverio Ritter
- Created cardinal: 28 April 1969 ("in pectore"); 5 March 1973 (published); by Pope Paul VI
- Rank: Cardinal-Priest

Personal details
- Born: Štěpán Trochta; 26 March 1905 Francova Lhota, Austria-Hungary
- Died: 6 April 1974 (aged 69) Litoměřice, Czechoslovakia
- Motto: Actio sacrificum caritas ("Actions offer charity")
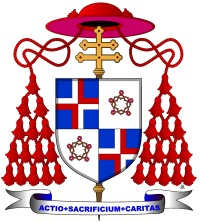
- Coat of arms: Štěpán Trochta's coat of arms

Styles of Štěpán Trochta
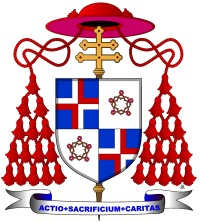
- Reference style: His Eminence
- Spoken style: Your Eminence
- Informal style: Cardinal
- See: Litoměřice

Ordination history of Štěpán Trochta
History
Priestly ordination
- Ordained by: Maurilio Fossati
- Date: 29 June 1932
- Place: Turin, Kingdom of Italy
Episcopal consecration
- Principal consecrator: Saverio Ritter
- Co-consecrators: Josef Beran; Moric Picha
- Date: 16 November 1947
- Place: Prague, Czechoslovakia
Cardinalate
- Elevated by: Pope Paul VI
- Date: 28 April 1969 ("in pectore"); 5 March 1973 (revealed)
Episcopal succession
Bishops consecrated by Štěpán Trochta as principal consecrator
- Ladislao Hlad: 26 March 1950

Štěpán Trochta (Czech pronunciation: [ˈʃcɛpaːn ˈtroxta]; 26 March 1905, Francova Lhota – 6 April 1974, Litoměřice) was a Czech Roman Catholic cardinal in the former Czechoslovakia who served as the Bishop of Litoměřice from 1947 until his death and was a professed member from the Salesians of Don Bosco. Trochta was considered a staunch defender of ecclesial rights and privileges in Czechoslovakia which the communist regime had sought to limit and suppress; Pope Paul VI (who made Trochta a cardinal) labelled Trochta after his death as a "defender of the faith" due to his commitment in standing up for Church rights and beliefs. He was a prisoner of war during World War II and for the decades after was stopped from performing his ecclesial duties until the end of his life when he was permitted to do so.

His cause for sainthood had been planned in his old diocese but plans to do so collapsed and it has been scrapped. There are still local initiatives to commence the process.

== Life ==
=== Education and priesthood ===
Štěpán Trochta was born on 26 March 1905 as the eldest child to František (1880-1912) and Anna; he was baptized as "Štěpán Maria". He had at least one brother (Josef; b. 1913) and one sister (Anna; b. 1911) who were still alive at the time of his death.

The Trochta's conditions grew worse with the death of his father in 1912. He was a Junák scout in his childhood and he studied at the archbishopric high school in Kroměříž in Olomouc after doing grade school from 1911 to 1918. But he was forced to interrupt his studies to take care of their small farm after his mother fell ill with tuberculosis in 1920. Her recuperation meant he could head into Turin in 1922 where he joined the Salesians of Don Bosco in 1923 and made his profession on 24 September 1925. But he encountered difficulties in getting to Turin for he was robbed in Vienna leaving him with his ticket to Venice. It was in the train station at Venice that a tollman asked where he was heading to with Trochta explaining what had happened. The tollman bought him a new train ticket to send him to Turin and this remained a tale he often repeated to demonstrate the goodness of God. He underwent his theological and philosophical studies in the Salesian Philosophical Institute in Turin and the Salesian Athenaeum where he earned his doctorate in 1932 prior to his ordination. Trochta received his ordination to the priesthood in Turin in 1932 from Cardinal Maurilio Fossati. He was then sent to central Moravia where he taught religious education and there oversaw the construction of the Saint John Bosco church in Ostrava. In October 1932 he enlisted for civil service for a brief period.

=== Episcopate ===
Pope Pius XII later appointed him as the Bishop of Litoměřice on 27 September 1947. He received his episcopal consecration in Prague.

During World War II he became a leader of resistance against the Nazis and was a known friend to Jews and communists during his time as a prisoner of war in the Mauthausen camp and the Dachau concentration camp. He had been subjected to harsh Gestapo interrogations at their Prague headquarters and then at the Prague Pankrac prison before being sent off to the Terezin concentration camp. He managed to flee from Mauthausen despite being wounded though was recaptured and sent to Dachau in December 1944. The U.S. troops liberated him and all other prisoners from the prison on 29 April 1945 at the war's end. He returned to Prague on 23 May 1945. He made an "ad limina apostolorum" visit to the pope in November 1948.

The war's end saw him serve as the spokesman for the Czechoslovak Episcopal Conference in their negotiations with the communist regime from 1948 until 1949 when the talks ended. From 1949 until 6 August 1968 he was impeded from exercising his pastoral duties. On 16 January 1953 the communist authorities arrested him and accused him of concocted charges of espionage and anti-state activities. On 23 June 1954 the supreme court sentenced him to two decades in prison (meaning he would be released in 1979) for serving as one of the Church's spies. In June 1960 he was amnestied but was forbidden to resume his clerical activities which led him to work as a plumber and construction laborer. In February 1962 he suffered a heart attack (remaining in hospital until 1963) and so was allowed to still retain his position but retire from official duties in November 1962 to a home for priests in Tábor in 1963 and then in Radvanov in 1964. In autumn 1968 he first met Pope Paul VI, who appreciated his work and witness. On 20 July 1969 the supreme court struck down his old conviction as a violation of his legal rights. Pope John XXIII had invited Trochta in 1962 to attend the Second Vatican Council but the Czech authorities did not grant him permission to travel to Rome.

In November 1968 he went to Rome for his second "ad limina apostolorum" visit and on 23 November met with Paul VI in a private audience. He then met with old Salesian friends in Turin before returning home before Christmas on 22 December. In February 1969 he led a pilgrimage to Rome to commemorate the death of Saint Cyril and on 30 January 1971 met with Paul VI in another private audience. On 29 October 1972 he attended the beatification of Michele Rua and on 15 February 1973 met with Paul VI in another private audience.

=== Cardinalate ===
Pope Paul VI named Trochta as a cardinal in pectore on 28 April 1969 and the appointment was made public in on 5 March 1973; he was elevated as the Cardinal-Priest of San Giovanni Bosco in Via Tuscolana with the titular church being raised pro hac vice. Agostino Casaroli delivered the news of his appointment to him on 5 March and Trochta was noted to have been surprised but received the news with considerable calm. On 6 April he arrived in Rome at the Leonardo da Vinci Airport where Casaroli and Cardinal Sebastiano Baggio greeted him. He received the red hat and title on 12 April 1973. Trochta made his formal installation in his new church on 15 April after having celebrated a 13 April Mass for the staff at L'Osservatore Romano. He met with Paul VI once again in a 14 April private audience and returned home to his diocese on 16 April. He attended the two synods with the first being from 11-28 October and the other from 30 September to 6 November 1971.

=== Death and funeral ===
Trochta died on 6 April 1974 in Litoměřice. He suffered a severe stroke on the morning of 6 April and was rushed to hospital where he died after having never regained consciousness. Trochta had undergone an operation in March 1974 but a week later on 5 April a communist official named Dlabal came to see him in the morning for a quasi-interrogation. The drunken officer was threatening and insulting to the wearied cardinal throughout the six-hour interview (11:30am to 5:30pm). He had a restless night and the next morning a nurse found him in severe pain from a cerebral hemorrhage.

There were 3,000 people present for his 16 April funeral including the Vatican's apostolic nuncio to Eastern Europeo, Archbishop Luigi Poggi; Cardinal Franz König of Austria; the German cardinal Alfred Bengsch, Archbishop of Berlin; and the two Polish cardinals, Stefan Wyszyński and Karol Józef Wojtyła - the future Pope John Paul II, who declared him a "martyr" during his speech at the funeral.

== Failed beatification cause ==
His cause for beatification was once a focus for the nation's episcopal conference around 2008 but after a period for preparation was scrapped. Local Church historian Jaroslav Sebek said in 2017 that the cause had no chance of ever beginning since Trochta had been "discredited" by the communist secret police (StB). Bishop Enrico dal Covolo - himself a Salesian - supported opening the cause as late as 2010.
