= Czechoslovak Bishops' Conference =

Former body of Catholic bishops

The Czechoslovak Bishops' Conference (Czech: Československá biskupská konference, Slovak: Československá biskupská konferencia), known after 1990 as the Bishops' Conference of Czechoslovakia, was an episcopal conference made up of the Catholic bishops in former Czechoslovakia before 1950, and from 1990 until the division of that country in 1993.

After 1993, in the two newly independent states two Bishops' Conferences were established:

- the Czech Bishops' Conference, and
- the Conference of Slovak Bishops.

== See also ==
- Catholic Church in the Czech Republic
