= Jaroslav Škarvada =

- Titular Bishop of Litomyšl
- Church: Catholic Church
- See: Titular See of Litomyšl
- In office: 18 December 1982 – 14 June 2010
- Predecessor: Position Established
- Successor: Pavel Konzbul
- Previous post: Auxiliary Bishop of Prague (1982-2002)

Orders
- Ordination: 12 March 1949 by Luigi Traglia
- Consecration: 6 January 1983 by Pope John Paul II

Personal details
- Born: 14 September 1924 Královské Vinohrady, Prague, Czechoslovakia
- Died: 14 June 2010 (aged 85) Prague, Czech Republic
- Coat of arms

Jaroslav Škarvada (September 14, 1924, in Královské Vinohrady – June 14, 2010, in Prague) was the Catholic titular bishop of Litomyšl and auxiliary bishop of the Archdiocese of Prague, Czech Republic.

Ordained to the priesthood on March 12, 1949, Škarvada was named bishop on December 18, 1982 and was ordained on January 6, 1983 retiring on September 25, 2002.
