= Josef Koukl =

- Bishop of Litoměřice
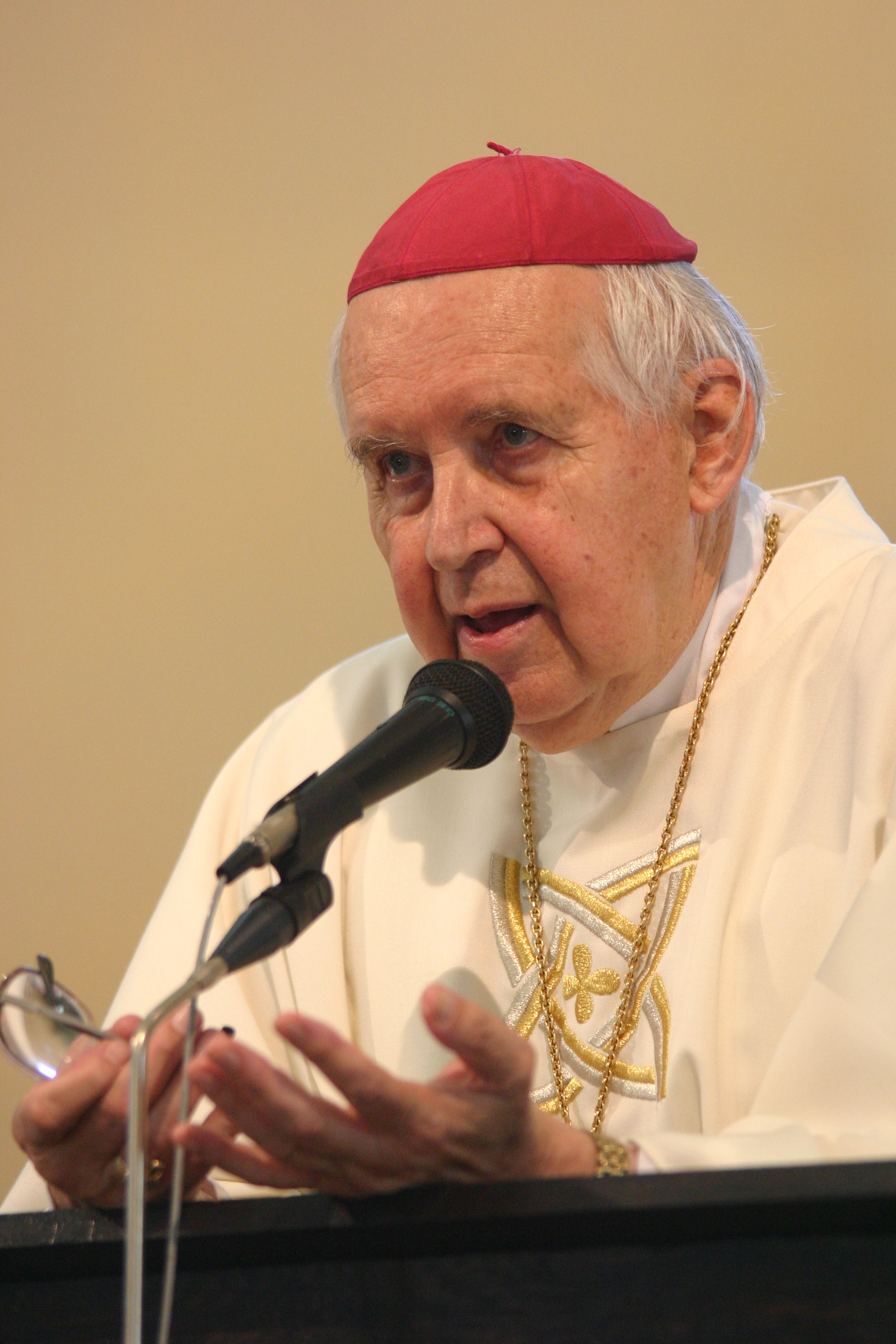
- Koukl in June 2007
- Church: Catholic Church
- Diocese: Diocese of Litoměřice
- In office: 26 July 1989 – 24 December 2003
- Predecessor: Štěpán Trochta
- Successor: Pavel Posád

Orders
- Ordination: 23 April 1950
- Consecration: 27 August 1989 by František Tomášek

Personal details
- Born: 8 November 1926 Brno, Moravia Province, Czechoslovak Republic
- Died: 22 May 2010 (aged 83) Litoměřice, Ústí nad Labem Region, Czech Republic

Josef Koukl (8 November 1926 in Brno – 22 May 2010 in Litoměřice) was the Roman Catholic bishop of the Roman Catholic Diocese of Litoměřice, Czech Republic.

Ordained to the priesthood on 23 April 1950, Koukl was appointed bishop of the Litoměřice Diocese by Pope John Paul II and was consecrated on 27 August 1989, retiring on 24 December 2003.
