= St. Stephen's Cathedral =

St. Stephen's Cathedral may refer to:

== Austria ==
- St. Stephen's Cathedral, Vienna

== Australia ==
- Cathedral of St Stephen, Brisbane

== Czech Republic ==
- St. Stephen's Cathedral, Litoměřice

== France ==
- Agde Cathedral
- Auxerre Cathedral
- Bourges Cathedral
- Châlons Cathedral
- Limoges Cathedral
- Meaux Cathedral
- Metz Cathedral
- St. Stephen's Greek Orthodox Cathedral, Paris
- Sens Cathedral
- Toulouse Cathedral
- Toul Cathedral

== Georgia ==
- Urbnisi Cathedral

== Germany ==
- St. Stephen's Cathedral, Passau

== Hungary ==
- St. Stephen's Basilica, Budapest
- Székesfehérvár Basilica

== Israel ==
- St. Stephen's Basilica, Jerusalem

== Italy ==
- Santo Stefano, Bologna

== United States ==
- St. Stephen Cathedral (Phoenix, Arizona)
- St. Stephen Cathedral (Owensboro, Kentucky)
- St. Stephen's Episcopal Cathedral (Harrisburg, Pennsylvania)
- St. Stephen's Episcopal Pro-Cathedral (Wilkes-Barre, Pennsylvania)

== See also ==
- St. Stephen's Church (disambiguation)
