= Catholic Church in the Czech Republic =

- Czech: Katolická církev v České republice
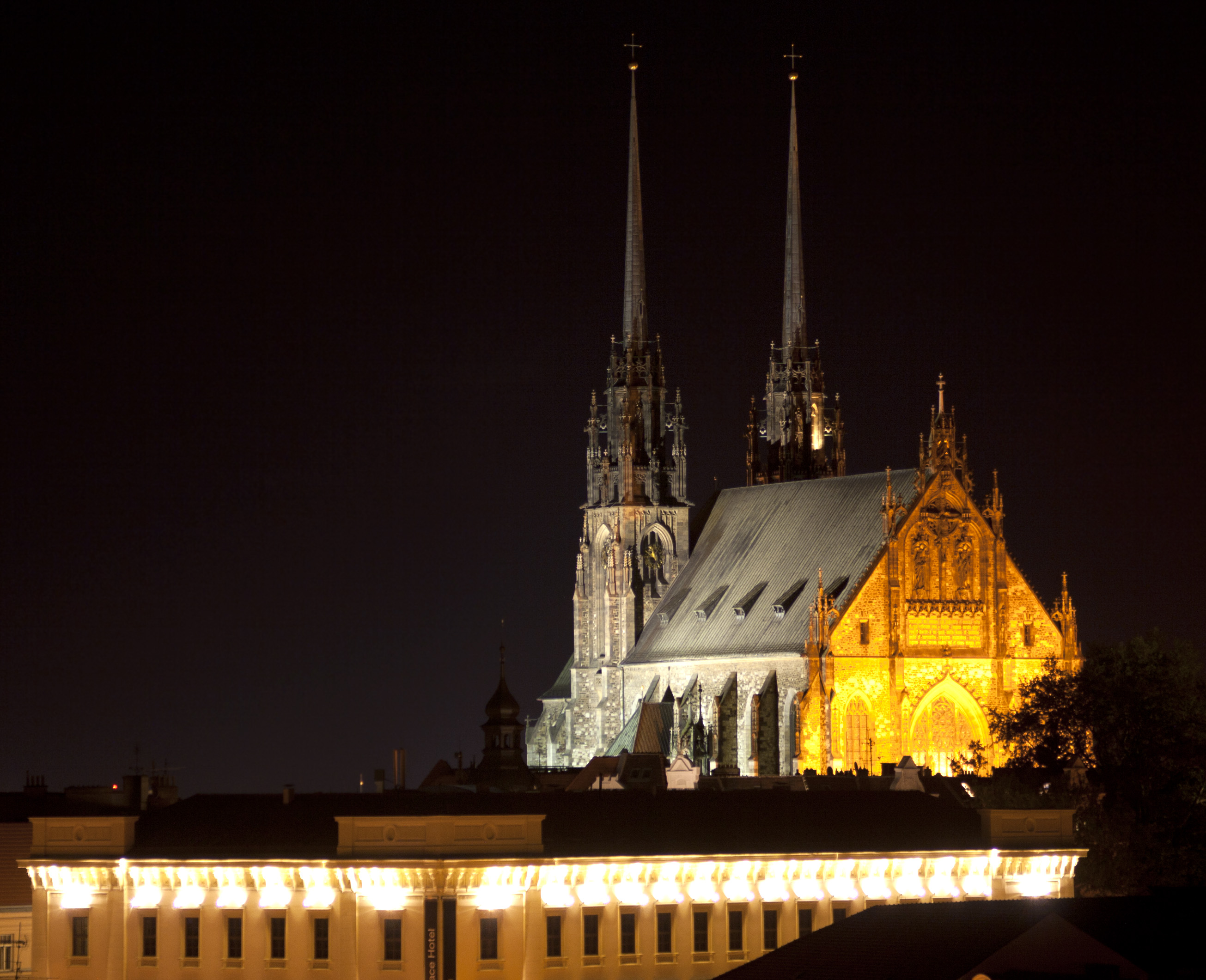
- Cathedral of Saints Peter and Paul in Brno at night
- Type: National polity
- Classification: Catholic
- Orientation: Latin and Eastern Catholic
- Scripture: Bible
- Theology: Catholic theology
- Polity: Episcopal
- Governance: ČBK
- Pope: Leo XIV
- President: Josef Nuzík
- Divisions: Archbishop
- Divisions: Bishop
- Language: Czech, Latin, Old Church Slavonic
- Liturgy: Roman Rite, Byzantine Rite
- Headquarters: Prague
- Territory: Czech Republic
- Members: 976,853 (self-identified, 2021)

The Catholic Church in the Czech Republic (Czech: Katolická církev v České republice) is part of the worldwide Catholic Church, under the spiritual leadership of the Pope, curia in Rome, and the Conference of Czech Bishops.

== Overview ==
In the 2021 census, 741,000 people identified themselves Roman Catholics, another 8,309 people identified as Greek Catholics, and an additional 236,000 people described themselves as simply Catholics. Together, they represent over 9% of the Czech population. There are eight dioceses including two archdioceses. Additionally, there is a separate jurisdiction for those of the Byzantine Rite called the Ruthenian Catholic Apostolic Exarchate of Czech Republic. The Catholic Church is the largest single religious denomination in the country.

== History ==
=== Protestant Bohemia vs. the Habsburgs ===
After the death of Jan Hus in 1415, the Czechs were mostly Hussite, a diverse sect which was considered heretical by the Catholic Church. The Hussite wars were fought over religious freedom in Bohemia as five consecutive crusades ordered by the Pope were unsuccessful. The majority of Hussites (the Utraquists) eventually made peace with Rome in the Religious peace of Kutná Hora of 1485. However, the Unity of the Brethren, founded in 1457, maintained a radical course and eventually played an important role in the Protestant Reformation and widely disseminating its principles. By the end of the 16th century, less than 20% of the population remained Catholic. After their defeat in the 1620 Battle of the White Mountain, Bohemia and Moravia were subjugated and forcefully re-converted to Catholicism by the imperial authorities, with Protestantism all but vanquished. The Czechs were made once again majority Catholic until after World War I, when anti-Catholicism fed by nationalist anti-German sentiment and national revival perceiving the Church as historical enemy caused mass defections from the Church.

=== Following World War I ===
The relationship between the Holy See and the government of Czechoslovakia was strained more often than not. The new Czechoslovak government demanded that the majority of incumbent bishops be replaced and systematically implemented a persecutory anti-church policy. Due to this imposition, Pavel Huyn, Primate and Archbishop of Prague, Cardinal Lev Skrbenský z Hříště, Archbishop of Olomouc, and at least other six bishops had been replaced or forced out to resign. After 1921 only two pre-war bishops were allowed to remain.

In the 1920s, Apostolic Nuncio Francesco Marmaggi left Prague to protest public celebrations of the Czech national hero Jan Hus, a heretic in the eyes of the Church; the underlying problem was that hundreds of Catholic places of worship had been previously seized by the government and assigned to the new Czechoslovak Hussite Church with an openly anti-Catholic purpose. Years of negotiations established a new working relationship, but the Vatican failed to persuade the Czechs to allow Marmaggi to return as nuncio, not even a face-saving few weeks.

The 1920 newly constituted Czechoslovak Church (since 1971 known as Czechoslovak Hussite Church) and the Czech Brethren (1918) were indeed major beneficiaries of this defection from Catholicism until after World War II, when the overall belief in organized religion started to fall steeply. In addition, the Sudeten Germans, who were those Austrians who ended up within Czech borders after World War I, were mostly Catholics, and their expulsion after World War II also reduced the Church's presence. Over 90% Catholic in 1910, the Czech Republic is now reduced to some 10%.

=== Communist regime ===
The Communist regime, which seized power in 1948 in what was then Czechoslovakia, confiscated all the property owned by churches and persecuted many priests. Churches were then allowed to function only under the state's strict control and supervision and priests' salaries paid by the state. Churches were seized, priests jailed or executed and those allowed to celebrate liturgies did so under the supervision of the secret police. After the Velvet Revolution, some churches and monasteries were returned, but the churches have since sought to get back other assets such as farms, woodlands and buildings.

During the Communist regime, various underground Catholic movements existed. Among these is the Koinotes group, centered on Bishop Felix Davidek, whose vicar general was Ludmila Javorová, ordained by him to the presbyterate.

=== 2012 Agreement on Church Property Restitution ===
In January 2012 the Czech government agreed to pay billions of dollars in compensation for property seized by the former totalitarian regime from the Church.

The Church restitution in the Czech Republic Agreement, as the compensation plan was called, has been signed. The process was spread over 30 years. Under the plan, the country's 17 churches, including Catholic, Protestant and Orthodox, would get 56 percent of their former property now held by the state – estimated at 75 billion koruna ($3.7 billion) – and 59 billion koruna ($2.9 billion) in financial compensation paid to them over the next 30 years. Eighty percent of funds and property will go the Catholic Church, by far the biggest recipient. The state will also gradually stop covering their expenses over the next 17 years.

In 2008, a similar bill was approved by the government but Parliament rejected it.

== Structure ==
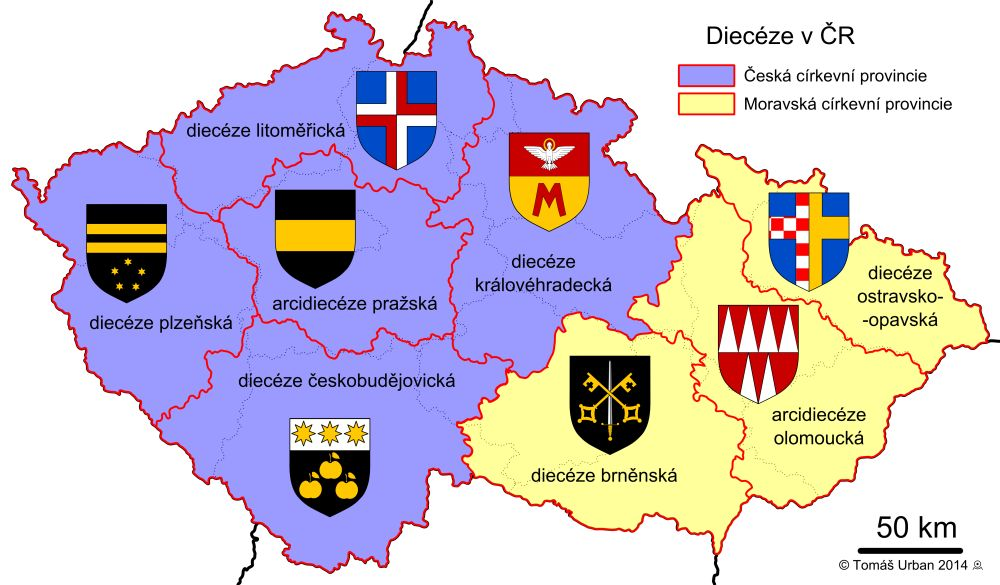
Catholic Church in the Czech Republic

- Archdiocese of Prague
  - Diocese of Plzeň
  - Diocese of Litoměřice
  - Diocese of České Budějovice
  - Diocese of Hradec Králové
- Archdiocese of Olomouc
  - Diocese of Brno
  - Diocese of Ostrava-Opava
- Apostolic Exarchate of the Greek Catholic Church in the Czech Republic

About 200 of the Czech Republic's 1,370 priests are from neighbouring Poland.

== See also ==
- Apostolic Nunciature to the Czech Republic
- Apostolic Nunciature to Czechoslovakia
- Religion in the Czech Republic
- Orthodox Church of the Czech Lands and Slovakia
