= St. Stephen's Cathedral, Litoměřice =

Coordinates: 50.5322°N 14.1283°E

St. Stephen's Cathedral
- Katedrála sv. Štěpána
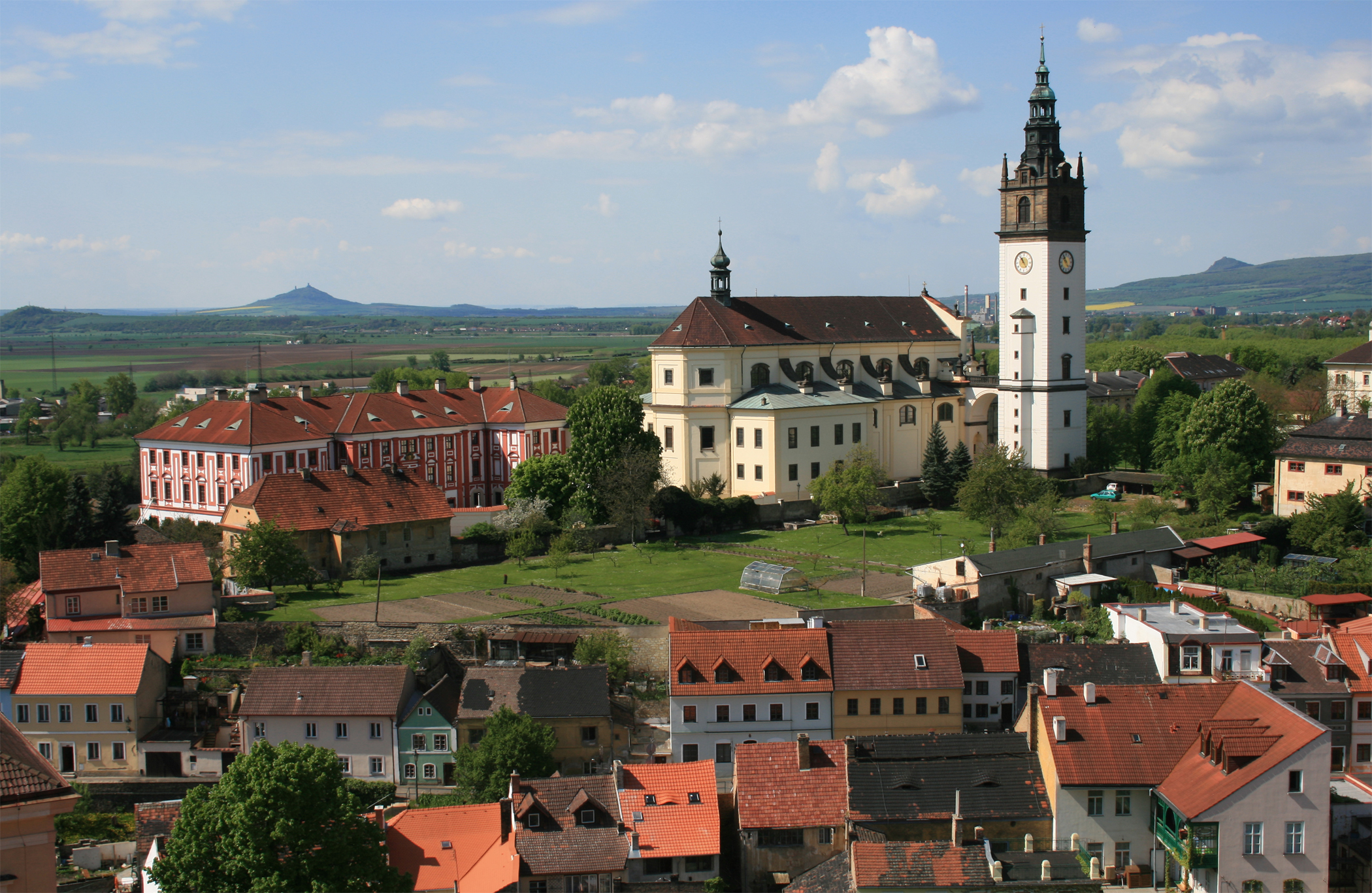
- St. Stephen's Cathedral
- Location: Litoměřice
- Country: Czech Republic
- Denomination: Roman Catholic Church

Sound of the Cathedral's bell tower (1936)

The St. Stephen's Cathedral (Czech: Katedrála sv. Štěpána) or simply Cathedral of Litoměřice, is the name given to a religious building of the Catholic Church that works as a cathedral of the Diocese of Litoměřice, and is also one of the most important cultural sites in the city. It is protected as a cultural monument of the Czech Republic.

Located on a hill in the place of an older church (originally a basilica) The temple was built in Romanesque style in the 11th century and rebuilt in the 14th century in the Gothic style. In the presbytery is a large altar dedicated to St. Stephen, patron of the cathedral.

There have been various modifications and repairs especially in 1716, 1778, 1825 and 1892.

== See also ==
- Roman Catholicism in the Czech Republic
- St. Stephen's Cathedral

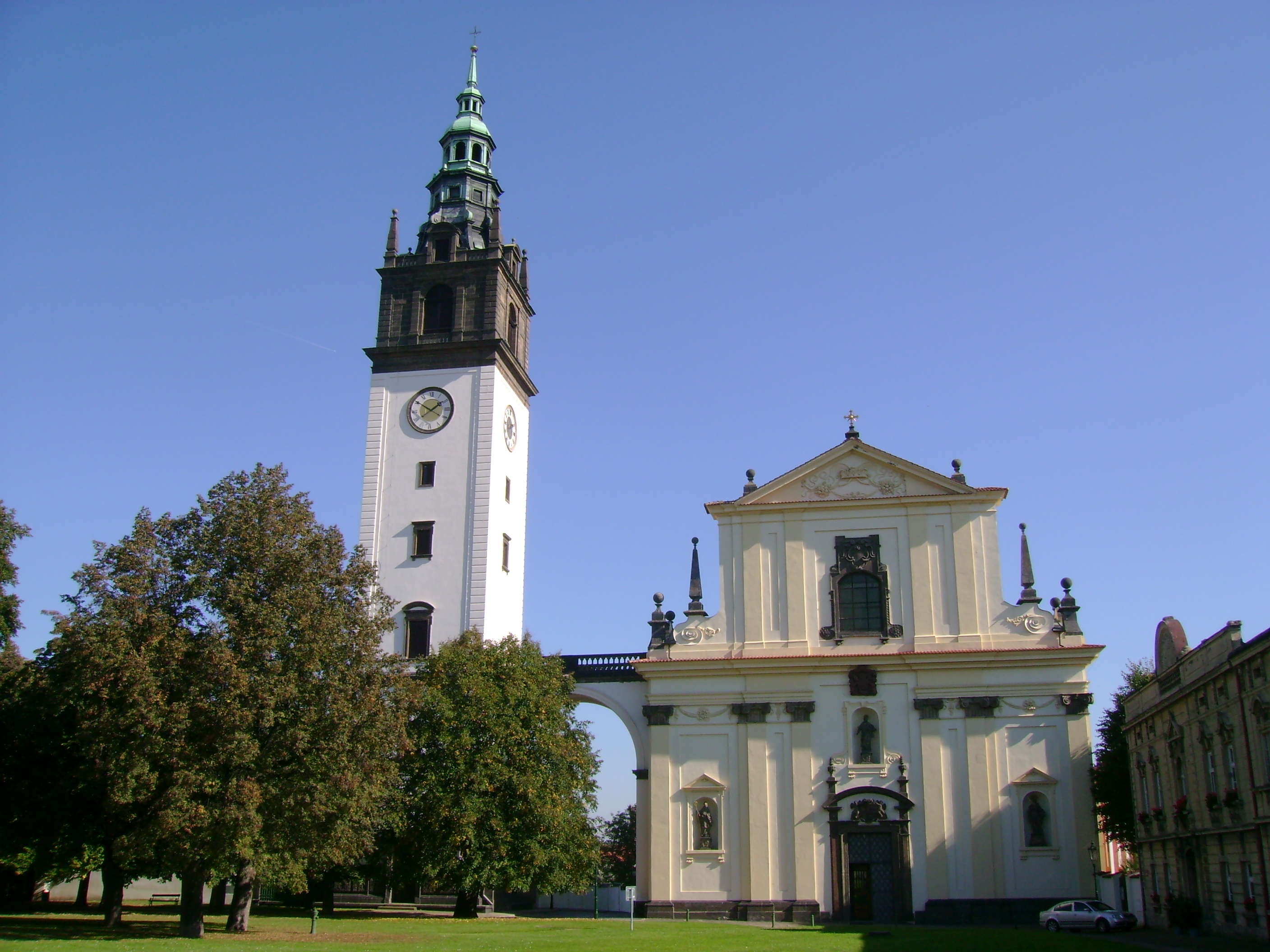
Another view
