= Václav Malý =

Czech Catholic prelate (born 1950)

His Excellency Václav Malý
- Auxiliary bishop emeritus of Prague
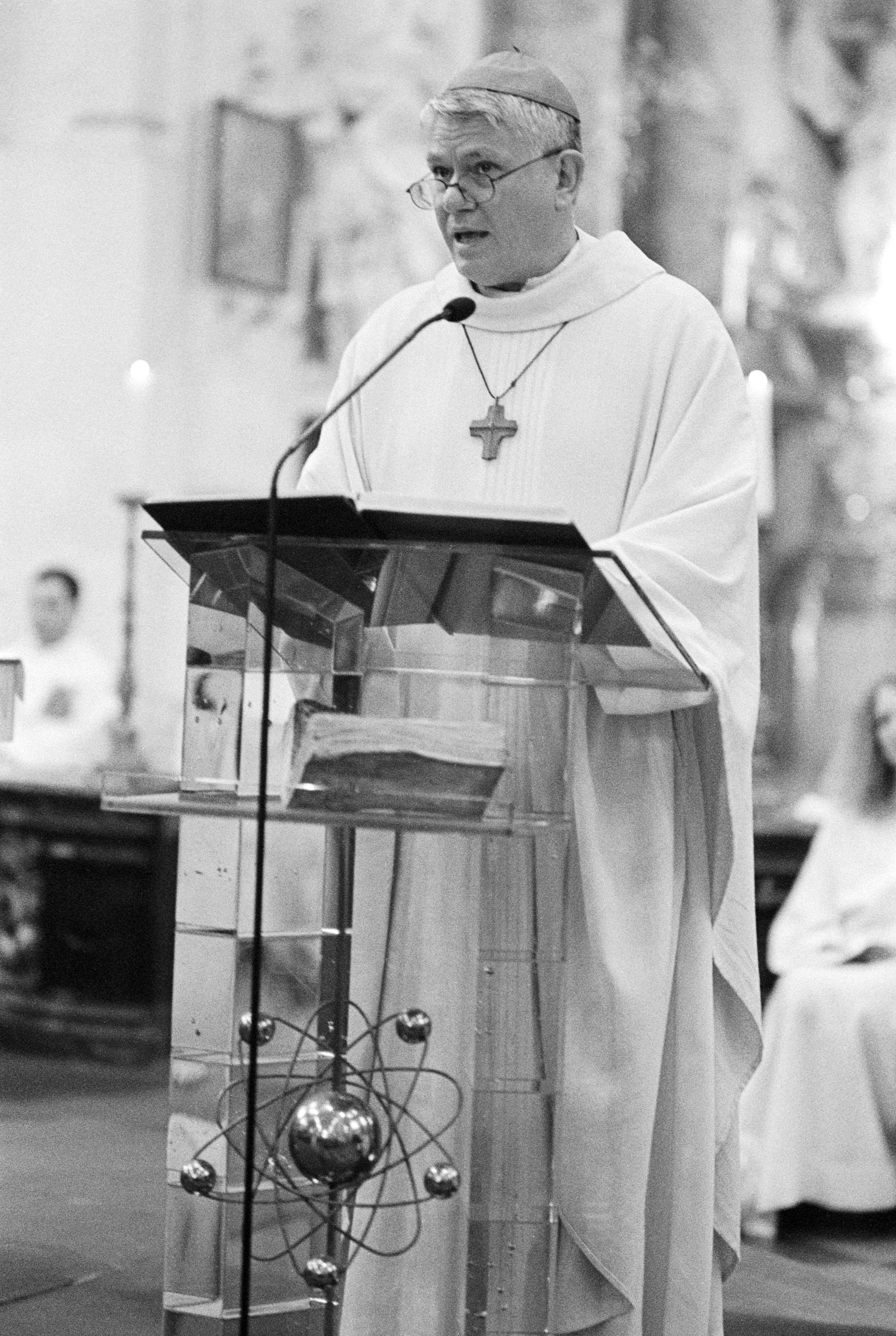
- Bishop Václav Malý
- Church: Roman Catholic
- Appointed: 3 December 1996
- Term ended: 21 September 2025
- Other post: Titular Bishop of Marcelliana

Personal details
- Born: September 21, 1950 (age 75) Prague, Czechoslovakia
- Motto: Pokora a pravda (Czech for 'Humility and truth')
- Coat of arms

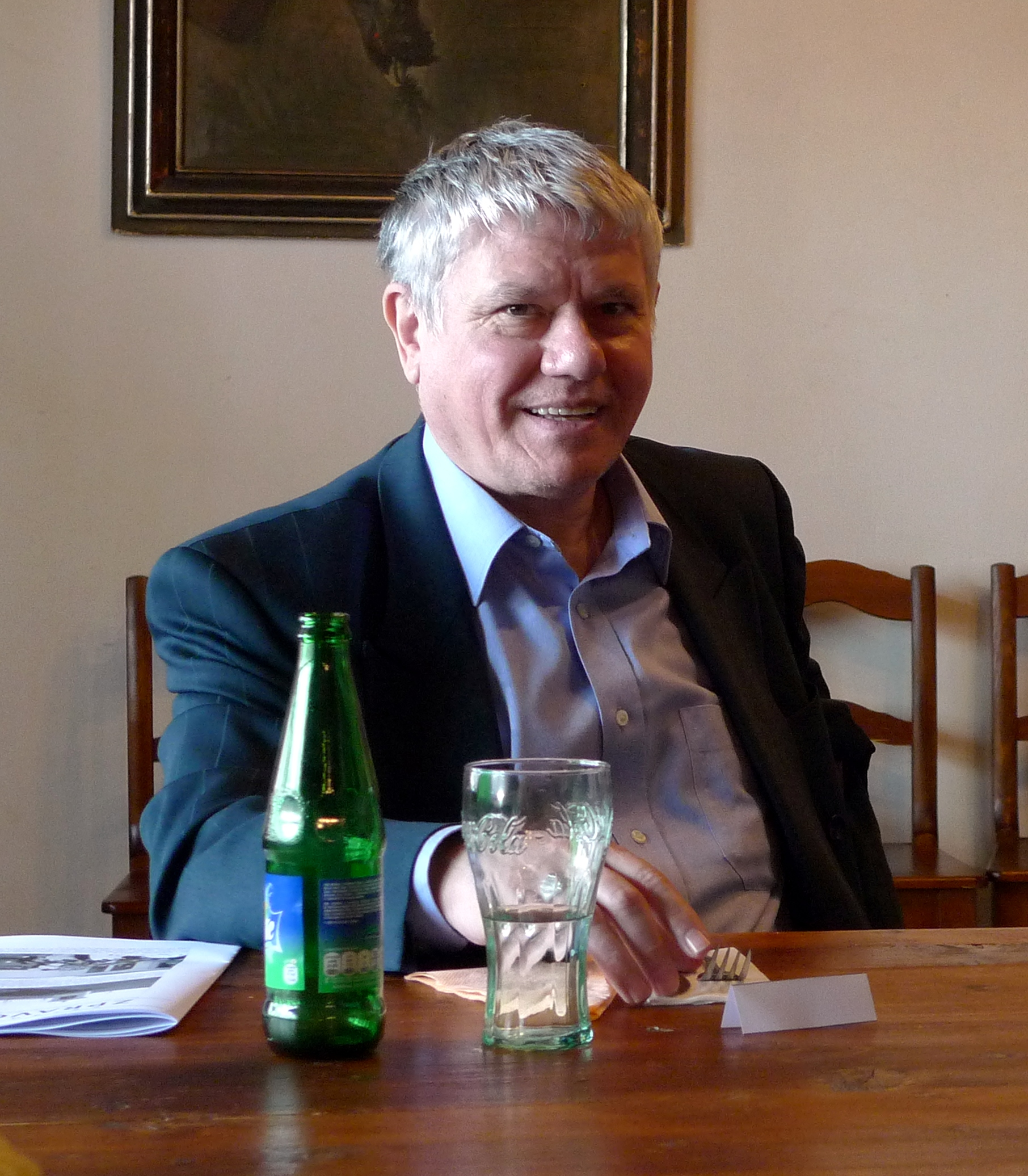
Portrait of Václav Malý

Václav Malý (born 21 September 1950) is a Czech prelate of the Catholic Church who served as an auxiliary bishop of Prague from 1997 to 2025. He played a prominent role in the anti-communist dissent as well as the 1989 Velvet Revolution that toppled the communist regime in Czechoslovakia.

== Biography ==
Václav Malý was born on 21 September 1950 in Prague. From 1969 to 1976, he studied at the Roman Catholic Saints Cyril and Methodius Faculty in Litoměřice, now part of the Catholic Theological Faculty of the Charles University. He was ordained a priest on 26 June 1976.

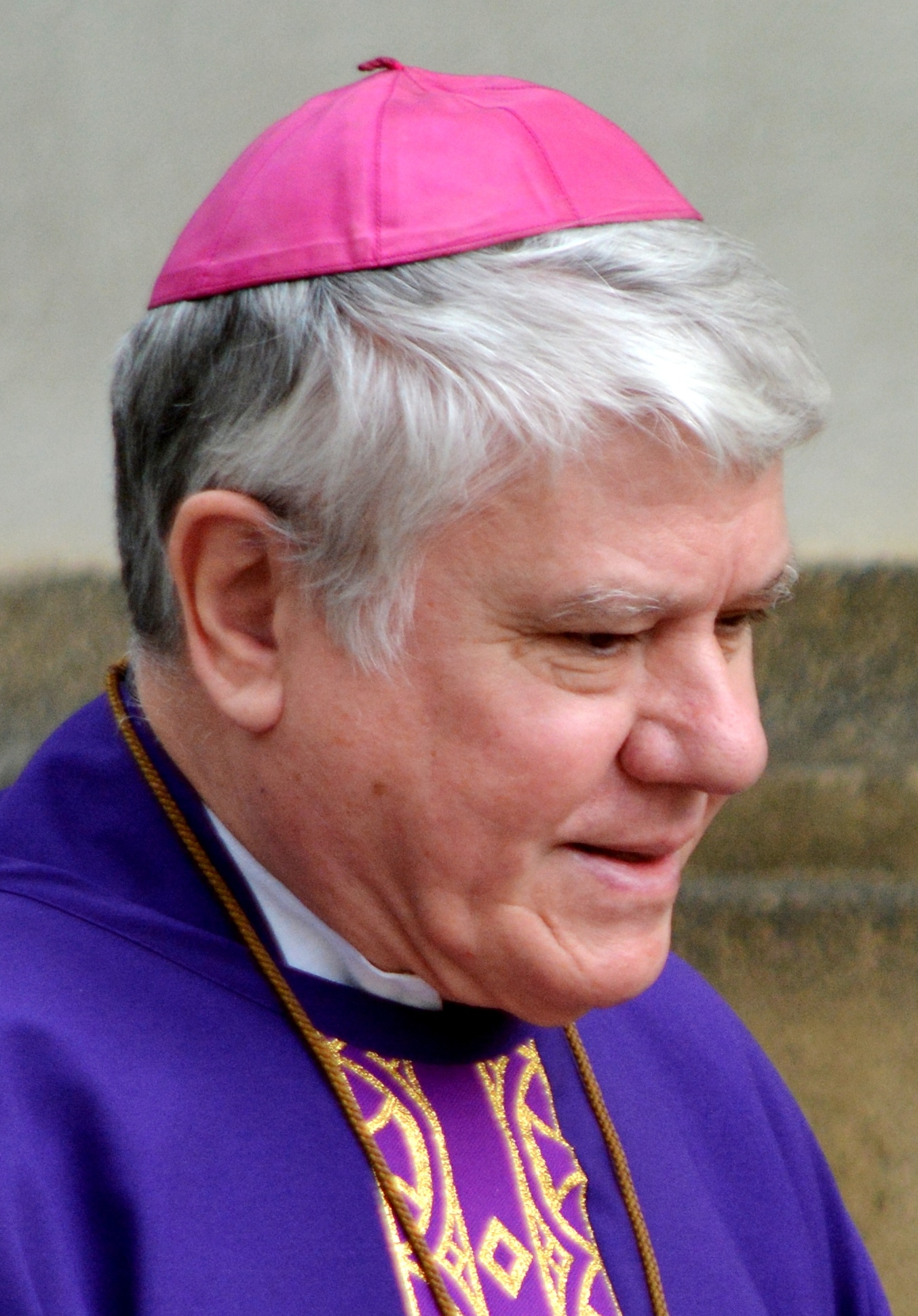

During the communist regime period in Czechoslovakia, Malý was a signatory of Charter 77 and in 1978 he was a founding member of the Committee for the Defense of the Unjustly Prosecuted. In January 1979, he was forbidden from exercising his activity as a priest and he was imprisoned without trial from May to December 1979. From 1980 to 1989 he worked as a fireman and surveyor, while secretly continuing to minister as a priest and participating in the creation of a Catholic samizdat. In 1989, during the Velvet Revolution, he was one of the main spokesmen for the Civic Forum and a member of the opposition delegation during the negotiations with the government of Ladislav Adamec. During the 4 December 1989 mass demonstration in Wenceslas Square, he read out the Civic Forum statement demanding free elections the following year and the immediate formation of a coalition government.

For his fight against communist totalitarian regime, he was awarded the Order of Tomáš Garrigue Masaryk in 1998 by the Czech president Václav Havel. In November 2021, Emmanuel Macron, President of France, awarded him the highest French order of merit, the Legion of Honour, for his personal commitment to human rights.

Pope John Paul II appointed Malý an auxiliary bishop of Prague on 11 January 1997.

Pope Leo XIV accepted his resignation as auxiliary bishop of Prague on 21 September 2025, his 75th birthday.
