= Diocaesarea (Isauria) =

Ancient city in Isauria

Coordinates: 36°34′52″N 33°55′31″E

Diocaesarea or Diocaesareia or Diokaisareia (Ancient Greek: Διοκαισάρεια), also called Anazarba (Ancient Greek: Ἀνάζαρβα) and Kyinda (Ancient Greek: Κύϊνδα) was a Graeco-Roman town located in Cilicia Trachea mentioned by Ptolemy and the ecclesiastical authorities. It was in time assigned to the late Roman province of Isauria. It was a bishopric; no longer the seat a residential bishop, it remains a titular see of the Roman Catholic Church.

Its site is located near Uzuncaburç in Asiatic Turkey.
