= František Tomášek =

Czech cardinal

His Eminence František Tomášek
- Cardinal; Archbishop of Prague
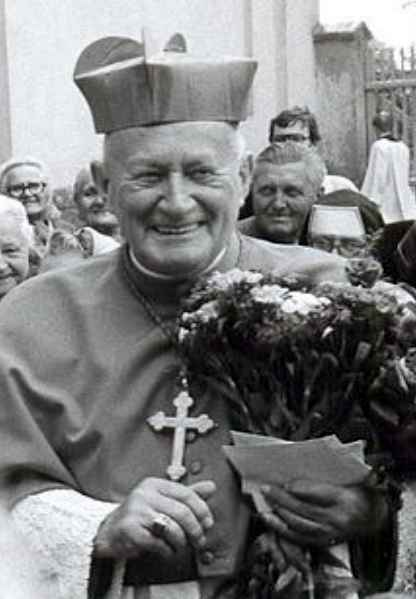
- Church: Roman Catholic
- Archdiocese: Prague
- Installed: 1977; 49 years ago
- Term ended: 1991; 35 years ago
- Predecessor: Josef Beran
- Successor: Miloslav Vlk
- Other posts: Cardinal-Priest of Santi Vitale, Valeria, Gervasio e Protasio
- Previous posts: Auxiliary Bishop of Olomouc (1949-1965); Apostolic Administrator of Prague (1965-1977)

Orders
- Ordination: 5 July 1922
- Consecration: 13 October 1949
- Created cardinal: 24 May 1976 (in pectore); 27 June 1977 (revealed); by Paul VI
- Rank: Cardinal

Personal details
- Born: František Tomášek; 30 June 1899 Studénka, Austria-Hungary (now Czech Republic)
- Died: 4 August 1992 (aged 93) Prague, Czechoslovakia (now Czech Republic)
- Motto: Laxabo Rete
- Coat of arms

Styles of František Tomášek
- Reference style: His Eminence
- Spoken style: Your Eminence
- Informal style: Cardinal
- See: Prague

František Tomášek (30 June 1899, in Studénka, Moravia – 4 August 1992, in Prague, Czechoslovakia) was a cardinal of the Roman Catholic Church in Bohemia, the 34th Archbishop of Prague, and a Roman Catholic theologian. His "cautious but resolute opposition to the Czechoslovak communist regime helped to bring about its peaceful demise in the 1989 Velvet Revolution".

== Biography ==
=== Early life and education ===
Born in 1899 in what was then part of the Austrian Empire, Tomášek was one of the six children of a schoolteacher who died when he was still a boy. After completing his schooling and military service, he studied at Saints Cyril and Methodius Faculty of Theology of Olomouc and was ordained on 7 May 1922. He taught religion in schools. Later he also taught at the Cyril and Methodius Faculty of Theology, where he obtained a doctorate in 1938. Soon after, the Nazi occupation led to the closure of Czech universities and Tomášek returned to teaching. After the war, Tomasek again taught in the faculty and also obtained a second doctorate.

=== Episcopacy ===
In spite of the opposition of the communist government in power in Czechoslovakia since February 1948, which, as well as imposing censorship on sermons and pastoral letters and banning many religious organisations, demanded its own approval for Church appointments, Pope Pius XII appointed Tomášek Auxiliary Bishop of Olomouc on 12 October 1949. Tomášek was secretly consecrated the very next day.

In 1950 Tomášek, with all the other bishops loyal to Rome, and half the priests were arrested and sent to labour camps. Monasteries and all but two of the Catholic seminaries were closed, and the Eastern-rite Catholic Church in Slovakia was banned. In 1953 Tomášek was freed from the Želiv camp, but allowed to function only as parish priest in the village of Moravská Huzová.

To the surprise of many, the government permitted him to attend the Second Vatican Council, the only Czechoslovak bishop able to participate in all the sessions (1962–1965).

In 1965 Cardinal Josef Beran, the Archbishop of Prague, was allowed to leave Czechoslovakia in accordance with an agreement that, in return for concessions to the Church, he would remain in Rome, and Tomášek was appointed on 18 February 1965 to administer the archdiocese, thus finally being permitted to leave Moravská Huzová.

Tomášek speedily pledged support for the reforms of the Prague Spring under Alexander Dubček in 1968. With the greater freedom allowed, he set about applying also the reforms instituted by the Second Vatican Council. The Soviet-led invasion of August 1968 again removed almost all the freedoms won under Dubček, though the state permission for the Eastern-rite Church to exist was not revoked.

=== Cardinalate ===
On 24 May 1976 Pope Paul VI secretly (in pectore) appointed Tomášek to the College of Cardinals. In the following year, the Pope felt the danger of reprisals by the Czechoslovak government was sufficiently diminished for him to publish the appointment on 27 June 1977. He also appointed Tomášek Archbishop of Prague, the see over which it had been considered more prudent to let Tomášek continue to have only the powers of an apostolic administrator even after the death of Cardinal Beran on 17 May 1969.

Tomášek took part in the August and October conclaves of 1978 that elected John Paul I and John Paul II. The latter, an old friend of Tomášek, infused new courage in the leaders of the Catholic Church in east-central Europe, including Tomášek, who proceeded to criticise government policies openly and to back initiatives by lay organisations demanding greater freedom, including Charter 77.

=== Late life and death ===
The Velvet Revolution of November 1989 was followed by Pope John Paul II's April 1990 visit to Czechoslovakia. On 27 March 1991, when Tomášek was almost 92 years old (long past the age of 75 at which bishops are to offer their resignation), his resignation from the governance of the Archdiocese of Prague was made effective. He died on 4 August 1992.

== His residence headquarters in Prague ==
František Tomášek's residence headquarters in Prague were used as the Emperor's palace in the filming of Amadeus, according to the credits.

Catholic Church titles
Preceded by Josef Beran	Archbishop of Prague; 1977–1991	Succeeded by Miloslav Vlk
