= Miloslav Vlk =

Czech prelate

His Eminence Miloslav Vlk
- Cardinal; Archbishop of Prague
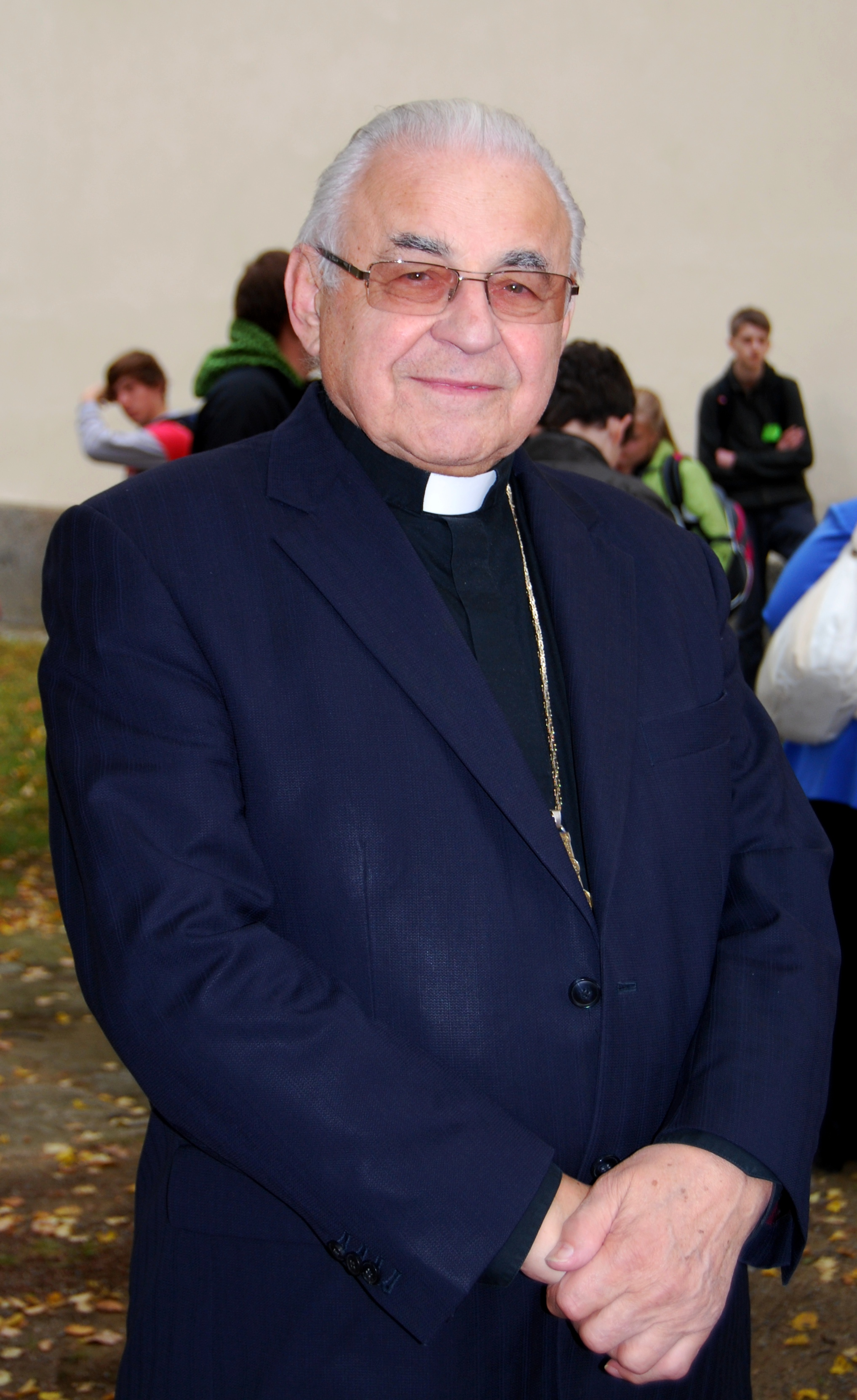
- Cardinal Vlk in 2012
- Church: Roman Catholic
- Archdiocese: Prague
- Installed: 1 June 1991
- Term ended: 13 February 2010
- Predecessor: František Tomášek
- Successor: Dominik Duka
- Other post: Cardinal-Priest of Santa Croce in Gerusalemme
- Previous post: Bishop of České Budĕjovice (1990-1991)

Orders
- Ordination: 23 June 1968
- Consecration: 31 March 1990
- Created cardinal: 26 November 1994 by John Paul II
- Rank: Cardinal-Priest

Personal details
- Born: 17 May 1932 Líšnice, Sepekov, Czechoslovakia
- Died: 18 March 2017 (aged 84) Prague, Czech Republic
- Motto: Archiepiscopus Lupus est decano Lupo lupus
- Coat of arms

Miloslav Vlk (Czech: [ˈmɪloslaf ˈvl̩k]; 17 May 1932 – 18 March 2017) was a Czech prelate of the Roman Catholic Church who served as Archbishop of Prague from 1991 to 2010. He was made a cardinal in 1994. He was also the President of the Council of European Bishops' Conferences (1993–2001).

== Early life ==
Vlk was born in Líšnice, a municipal part of the market town of Sepekov, in the Písek District of Southern Bohemia. He spent his childhood in Záluží near Chyšky, where he attended elementary school and experienced the hard labour of farm work.

At the age of 11, he first started thinking about the priesthood. This initial idea of a priestly vocation came to him because he felt particularly challenged by a poster hanging in his parish church that continued to attract his attention. The poster said: 'Wouldn't you like to become a priest?'. That goal seemed unattainable at the time, so he dreamed of becoming an aircraft pilot.

On 20 June 1952 he passed his final examination at Secondary School in České Budějovice, Southern Bohemia. In those years of Communist persecution theological studies were impossible, so from 1952 to 1953 he worked at the Motor Union automobile factory in České Budějovice and from 1953 to 1955 did military service in Karlovy Vary.

Despite the political situation, after being discharged he was able to study archival science at the Arts Faculty of the Charles University in Prague and received his degree in 1960. He worked in various archives in Southern Bohemia: at the Regional Archives of Třeboň in Jindřichův Hradec, and from December 1960 to 1964 at the Civic and District Archives of České Budějovice, where he served as director.

In this same period he published a series of articles in various scientific reviews. In 1964 he left this work in order to study at the Theology Faculty of Saints Cyril and Methodius in Litoměřice (1964–1968).

== Priesthood ==
On 23 June 1968, during the 'Prague Spring', he was ordained a priest at the age of 36 and was immediately appointed secretary to Bishop Josef Hlouch of České Budějovice (1968–1971).

The state authorities, worried about his influence and pastoral activity, forced him in 1971 to leave České Budějovice and sent him to the parishes of Lažiště and Záblatí, isolated on the mountains of the Bohemian Forest in the Prachatice district. From 1 November 1972 he was parish priest in Rožmitál pod Třemšínem and at the same time in Bohutín and Drahenice, in the Příbram district. There in 1978, the state authorities, in collaboration with the local communists, revoked his state authorization to exercise his priestly ministry.

Citizen Vlk was thus forced to live underground in Prague from October 1978 to 31 December 1988.

From 1978 to 1986 he worked as a window-cleaner in downtown Prague. In this period he secretly carried out his pastoral activity with small groups of lay people. From 1986 to 1988 he was able to work in the district archives of the Czechoslovak State Bank in Prague.

On 1 January 1989, at the start of the 'turning point', he was permitted to exercise the priestly ministry for a 'trial' year. He became parish priest at Žihobce and Bukovník in the Klatovy region of Western Bohemia. Subsequently, on 1 September 1989, he began to work as a curate on the Bavarian (German) border: at Čachrov, Javorná, Železná Ruda, Běšiny and Stráž na Šumavě.

== Episcopacy and Cardinalate ==
Styles of Miloslav Vlk
- Reference style: His Eminence
- Spoken style: Your Eminence
- Informal style: Cardinal
- See: Prague (emeritus)

The "Velvet Revolution" changed the status of the church in Czechoslovakia and on 14 February 1990 Pope John Paul II appointed Vlk Bishop of České Budějovice and he was consecrated on 31 March 1990 from Bishop Antonín Liška.

On 27 March 1991 Pope John Paul II appointed Vlk Archbishop of Prague to succeed Cardinal František Tomášek. He was installed on 1 June 1991. He was made a Cardinal by Pope John Paul II in the Consistory of 26 November 1994, becoming the Cardinal-Priest of Santa Croce in Gerusalemme.

In 1992 he was elected President of the Czech Episcopal Conference; a role that he held until 2001. From 16 April 1993 until 31 May 2001 Archbishop Vlk was President of the Council of European Episcopal Conferences (CCEE), as the successor to Carlo Maria Martini, Archbishop of Milan, Italy. Special Secretary of the 1st Special Assembly for Europe of the Synod of Bishops (1991); and has taken part in the 9th General Assembly of the Synod of Bishops (1994) and in the 2nd Special Assembly for Europe (1999).

Between 1992 and 1993 he received three honorary degrees: one each from Illinois Benedictine College and the University of St. Thomas in the U.S., and a doctorate in theology from the Faculty of Passau. In addition to these academic awards he has also received various honorary citizenships.

Cardinal Vlk died, after a long illness on 18 March 2017.

Vlk was one of the cardinal electors who participated in the 2005 papal conclave that selected Pope Benedict XVI. Vlk reached age 80 on 17 May 2012 and lost the right to participate in any papal conclave and on the same day he ceased to hold his various Curial memberships. He was a member of the following dicasteries of the Roman Curia:

- Oriental Churches (congregation)
- Social Communications (council)
- Special Council for Europe of the General Secretariat of the Synod of Bishops

Pope Benedict XVI accepted Cardinal Vlk's resignation as Archbishop of Prague on 13 February 2010 and nominated Dominik Duka to succeed him.

Vlk served for 18 years as Moderator of the Bishop-Friends of the Focolare Movement. On 10 August 2012, he was succeeded in this position by Monsignor Francis Xavier Kriengsak Kovitvanit, the Metropolitan Archbishop of the Roman Catholic Archdiocese of Bangkok in Bangkok, Thailand.

== Views ==
=== Church properties in the Czech Republic ===
Vlk has fought a decade-long battle to work out a new legal framework for the Catholic Church in the Czech Republic, which would include resolution of some $6 billion in church property confiscated under the Communists and never returned. That includes almost a million acres (4,000 km²) of forest which formed the church's traditional economic base.

=== Political groups ===
Vlk has been sharply critical of the rise of far-right and xenophobic sentiment in Central Europe, joining Jewish protests in 2007 when right-wingers planned a march through Prague's Jewish quarter on the anniversary of Kristallnacht.

On the 41st anniversary of the Warsaw Pact invasion of Czechoslovakia, Cardinal Vlk called for the ban of the Communist Party of Bohemia and Moravia, which was then the third most popular political party in the Czech Republic according to opinion polls.

=== Conflict with Lefebvrites ===
In 2006, Vlk criticized a group of Lefebvrite traditionalists who held a conference in Prague, accusing them of sympathies for "anti-Semitism and neo-Nazism". Local organizers responded that Vlk showed "ill will to socially ostracize Catholics who point to the negative consequences of liberalization processes in the church."

== See also ==
Religious titles
Preceded by František Tomášek	Archbishop of Prague; 1991–2010	Succeeded by Dominik Duka
