= Bojanovice =

Bojanovice may refer to places in the Czech Republic:

- Bojanovice (Prague-West District), a municipality and village in the Central Bohemian Region
- Bojanovice (Znojmo District), a municipality and village in the South Moravian Region
- Bojanovice, a village and part of Rabí in the Plzeň Region
- Bojanovice, a village and part of Zlobice in the Zlín Region
- Dolní Bojanovice, a municipality and village in the South Moravian Region
- Horní Bojanovice, a municipality and village in the South Moravian Region
