= Petr Esterka =

Czech Catholic priest (1935–2021)

His Excellency Petr Esterka
- Auxiliary Bishop, Diocese of Brno
- Church: Roman Catholic
- Province: Moravian
- Metropolis: Olomouc
- Diocese: Brno
- Installed: 1999

Personal details
- Born: 14 November 1935 (age 90) Dolní Bojanovice, Czechoslovakia (Present day Czech Republic)
- Died: 10 August 2021 (aged 85)
- Buried: Dolní Bojanovice
- Motto: Euntes in mundum universum
- Coat of arms

Petr Esterka (November 14, 1935 – August 10, 2021) was a Czech-American Roman Catholic prelate. He served as the auxiliary bishop of the Roman Catholic Diocese of Brno from 1999 to 2013, the Bishop for Czech Catholics in Diaspora in Canada and the United States from 1999 to 2021, and the titular bishop of Cefala from 1999 until his death in 2021.

== Biography ==
Esterka was born in Dolní Bojanovice, Czechoslovakia (present-day Czech Republic), on November 14, 1935. In February 1948, Czechoslovakia's new communist government closed the Jesuit school Esterka was attending and arrested his teachers. Esterka and two other men fled Czechoslovakia to Austria on June 15, 1957, where he lived in the Glassenbach refugee camp near Salzburg for three months. He then moved to Rome, where he studied theology and philosophy at the Pontifical Lateran University.

He was ordained a Catholic priest at the Archbasilica of Saint John Lateran on March 9, 1963. He was then sent to a parish in San Antonio, Texas, where he became an assistant pastor for three years. He returned to the Pontifical Lateran University to complete his doctorate in theology. In February 1967, he began teaching theology at the College of St. Catherine, now known as St. Catherine University, in Saint Paul, Minnesota. He earned a full professorship in 1980 and taught at St. Catherine until 1993.

Esterka became an American citizen in December 1968. He joined the United States Air Force Reserves as a military chaplain in 1974, where he was based at the 934th Tactical Airlift Group in Minneapolis. He retired from the Air Force Reserves in 1995 with the rank of lieutenant colonel.

He began work with the Czech immigrants to Canada and the United States beginning in 1978. In 1984, Esterka founded the North American Pastoral Center for Czech Catholics in Anaheim, California, with support from John Louis Morkovsky, the then-Bishop of the Roman Catholic Archdiocese of Galveston–Houston.

He moved to the Velehrad California Czech Center in Placentia, California, from which he held Czech Language masses in the Los Angeles, San Diego and San Francisco metro areas.

In 1999, he was appointed auxiliary bishop of the Roman Catholic Diocese of Brno by Pope John Paul II, with the instructions that his main mission remain with Czech Catholics in the United States, Canada and Australia. Therefore, Esterka remained in California. He was official ordained auxiliary bishop of Brno at the Cathedral of St. Peter and Paul, Brno, on September 11, 1999.

Czech Foreign Minister Karel Schwarzenberg awarded Esterka the Gratias Agit Award in 2013 for contributions to the Czech Republic abroad.

Bishop Petr Esterka died in the U.S. state of California on August 10, 2021, at the age of 85. His American funeral mass was celebrated by Bishop Kevin Vann at the Christ Cathedral in Garden Grove, California, on August 20, 2021. His remains were flown back to the Czech Republic, where a funeral masses was also held in Brno with burial in Dolní Bojanovice.
