= Norbert Klein =

Norbert Klein may refer to:

- Norbert Klein (bishop)
- Norbert Klein (politician)
