= Pavel Konzbul =

Czech bishop (born 1965)

- Bishop of Brno
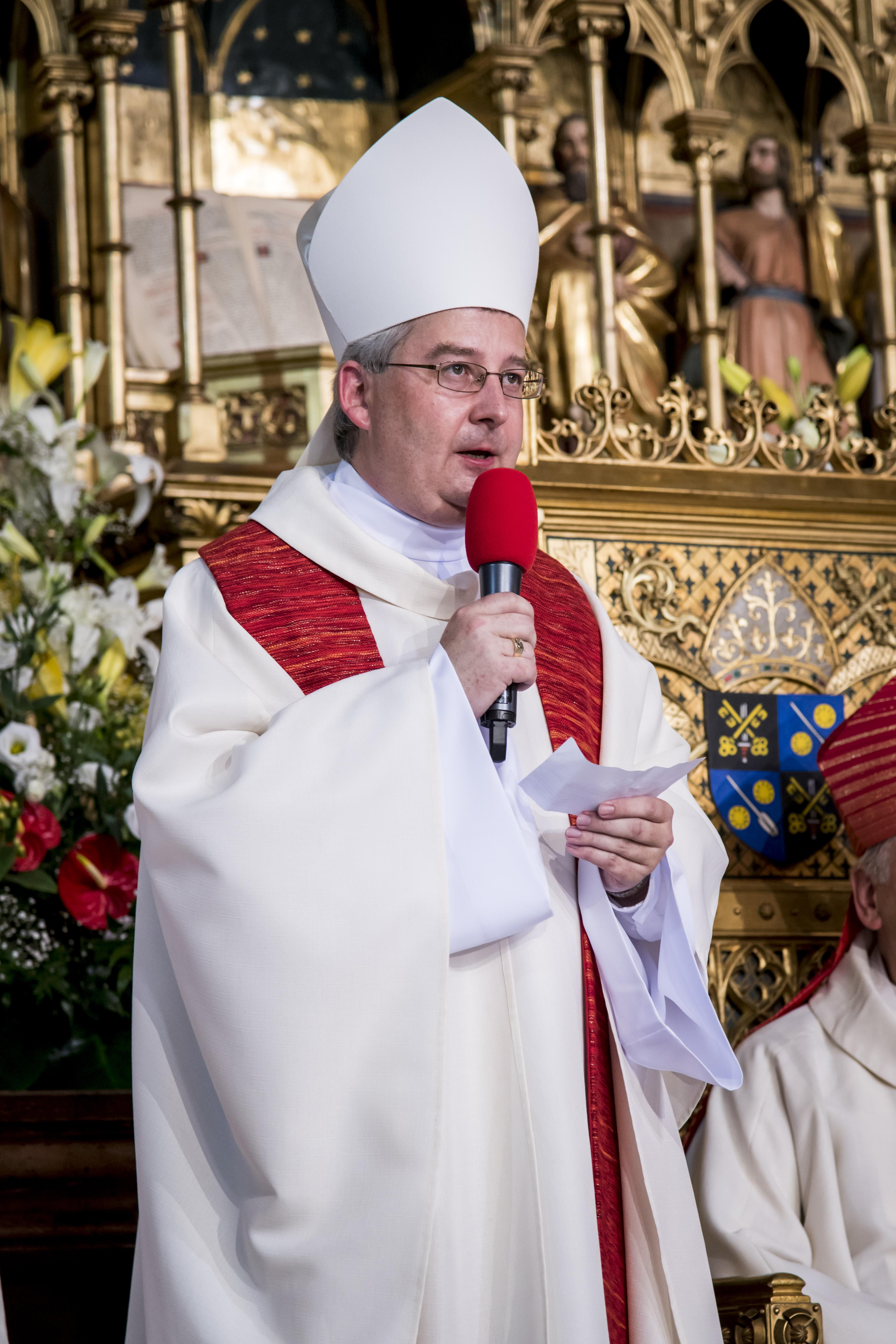
- Church: Catholic Church
- Diocese: Diocese of Brno
- Installed: 26 May 2022
- Predecessor: Vojtěch Cikrle
- Previous posts: Titular Bishop of Litomyšl (2016-2022); Auxiliary Bishop of Brno (2016-2022)

Orders
- Ordination: 28 June 2003 by Vojtěch Cikrle
- Consecration: 29 June 2016 by Vojtěch Cikrle

Personal details
- Born: 17 October 1965 (age 60) Brno, Czechoslovak Socialist Republic

Pavel Konzbul (born 17 October 1965) is a bishop of the Roman Catholic Diocese of Brno in the Czech Republic. He was appointed in 2016.

== Biography ==
Pavel Konzbul was born on 17 October 1965 in Brno. After his high school studies, he graduated from the Faculty of Electrical Engineering and Communication of the Brno University of Technology and worked as a researcher in the field electrical engineering.

In 1995 he began his studies at the Cyril and Methodius Theological Faculty of Palacký University Olomouc, which he completed in 2000. In 2003 he received priestly ordination. He then worked as a parish vicar in Boskovice and Svitávka, in Hustopeče near Brno, Starovičky and an excurrendo administrator in Starovice (all in the South Moravian Region). In 2013 he was appointed parish priest of the parish at the Cathedral of Saints Peter and Paul in Brno. On 21 May 2016, he was appointed Titular Bishop of Litomyšl and auxiliary Bishop of Brno by Pope Francis. On 29 June 2016 he received the Episcopal ordination in the Cathedral of Saints Peter and Paul in Brno from his diocesan bishop Vojtěch Cikrle. On 26 May 2022 the Holy Father Francis appointed him to be the 14th Diocesan Bishop of Brno.

In the Czech Bishops' Conference, Bishop Pavel Konzbul is a member of the Commission for the Priesthood and the Commission for Catholic Education. He is the author of religious publications, intended primarily for young people.
