= List of Catholic dioceses in the Czech Republic =

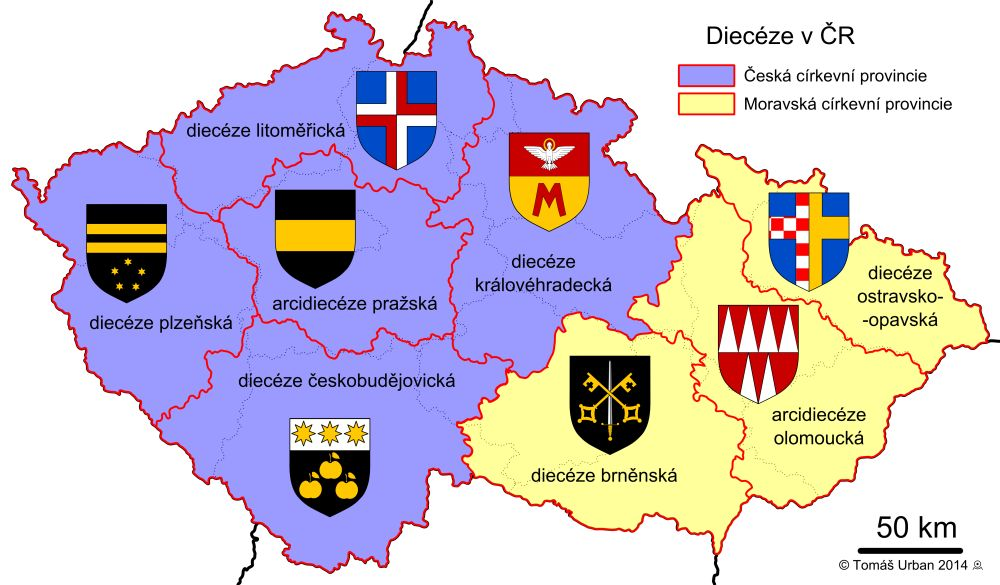
Map of Catholic dioceses in the Czech Republic

The Catholic Church in the Czech Republic, joint in the national Czech Episcopal Conference, comprises :

- a Latin hierarchy, consisting of two ecclesiastical provinces, each headed by a Metropolitan Archbishopric, with a total of six suffragan dioceses
- an Eastern Catholic (Byzantine Catholic) Apostolic Exarchate, covering the whole Czech Republic.

There are no other exempt Latin jurisdictions.

There is an Apostolic Nunciature to the Czech Republic as papal diplomatic representation (embassy-level).

== Current Latin dioceses ==
=== Ecclesiastical Province of Bohemia (Prague) ===
- Metropolitan Archdiocese of Prague
  - Diocese of České Budějovice
  - Diocese of Hradec Králové
  - Diocese of Litoměřice
  - Diocese of Plzeň

=== Ecclesiastical Province of Moravia and Czech Silesia (Olomouc) ===
- Metropolitan Archdiocese of Olomouc
  - Diocese of Brno
  - Diocese of Ostrava-Opava

== Current Eastern Catholic jurisdiction ==
exempt, i.e. directly dependent on the Holy See

=== Ruthenian Catholic Church ===
Byzantine Rite

- Apostolic Exarchate in the Czech Republic

== Defunct jurisdictions ==
All Latin

=== Titular See ===
One Episcopal titular bishopric : Diocese of Litomyšl

=== Other ===
- Apostolic Administration of Český Těšín (merged into Metropolitan Archdiocese of Olomouc)

== See also ==
- List of Catholic dioceses (structured view)

== Sources and external links ==
- GCatholic.org - data for all sections.
- Catholic-Hierarchy entry.
