= Stojice =

- Municipality
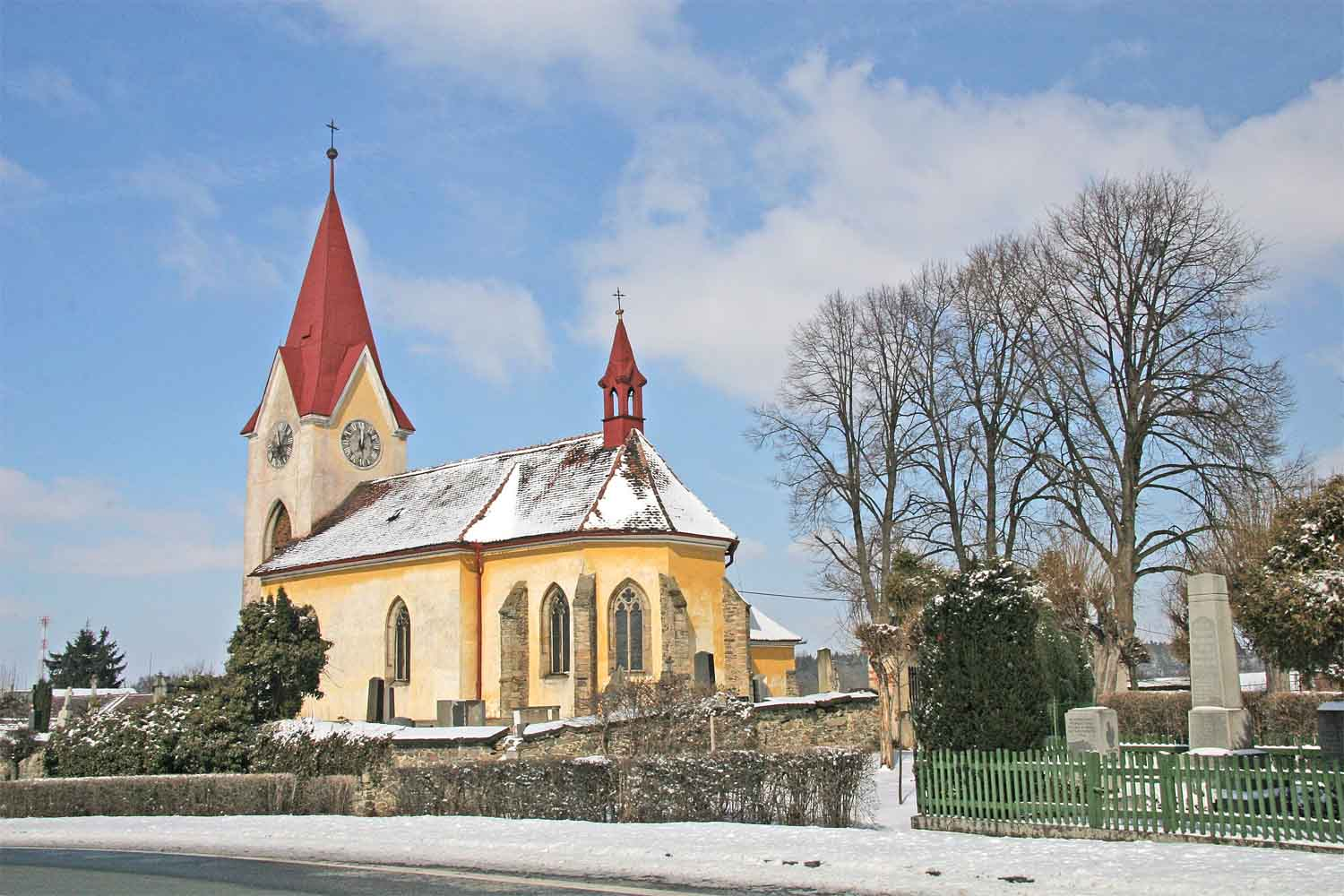
- Church of All Saints

- Flag Coat of arms

- Location in the Czech Republic
- Coordinates: 49°57′23″N 15°36′51″E
- Country: Czech Republic
- Region: Pardubice
- District: Pardubice
- First mentioned: 1349

Area
  - Total: 5.37 km^{2} (2.07 sq mi)
- Elevation: 305 m (1,001 ft)

Population (2026-01-01)
  - Total: 214
  - Density: 39.9/km^{2} (103/sq mi)
- Time zone: UTC+1 (CET)
  - Summer (DST): UTC+2 (CEST)
- Postal code: 535 01
- Website: www.stojice.cz

Stojice is a municipality and village in Pardubice District in the Pardubice Region of the Czech Republic. It has about 200 inhabitants.

== Etymology ==
The name of the village is derived from the personal name Stojata.

== Geography ==
Stojice is located about 13 kilometres (8 mi) southwest of Pardubice. It lies in the Iron Mountains. The highest point is at 360 m (1,181 ft) above sea level. The Struha Stream flows through the municipality.

== History ==
The first written mention of Stojice is from 1349.

== Demographics ==
Historical population

Year	Pop.	±%
1869	462	—
1880	526	+13.9%
1890	521	−1.0%
1900	534	+2.5%
1910	548	+2.6%

Year	Pop.	±%
1921	520	−5.1%
1930	457	−12.1%
1950	361	−21.0%
1961	344	−4.7%
1970	281	−18.3%

Year	Pop.	±%
1980	249	−11.4%
1991	227	−8.8%
2001	235	+3.5%
2011	214	−8.9%
2021	216	+0.9%

Source: Censuses

== Transport ==
The I/17 road (the section from Chrudim to Čáslav) runs through the municipality.

== Sights ==
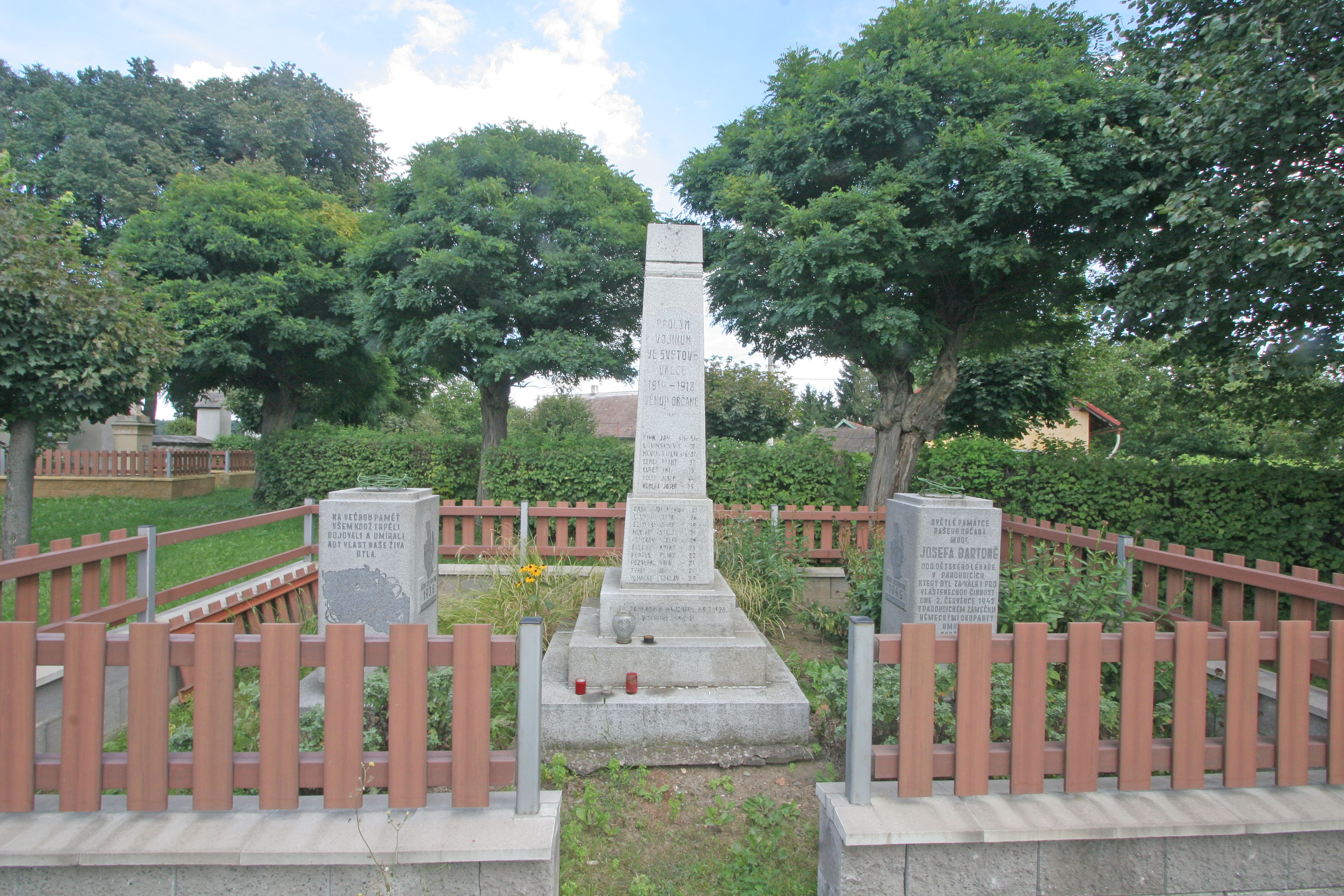
Memorials to the victims of the world wars and to Josef Bartoň

The main landmark of Stojice is the Church of All Saints. The original wooden church was first documented in 1349. In 1350, it was handed over to the bishopric of Litomyšl. The wooden church was replaced by the brick late Gothic building in the first third of the 16th century. It was rebuilt in the Baroque style in 1707, but its Gothic look was restored in 1867. A mortuary from the second half of the 19th century is also part of the protected church complex. In front of the church stands a statue of St. John of Nepomuk from 1672.

The memorials to the victims of the world wars and to Josef Bartoň (a pediatrician in Pardubice, who was martyred during the war for his duties on 2 July 1942) are protected together as one cultural monument.
