= Diocese of Litomyšl =

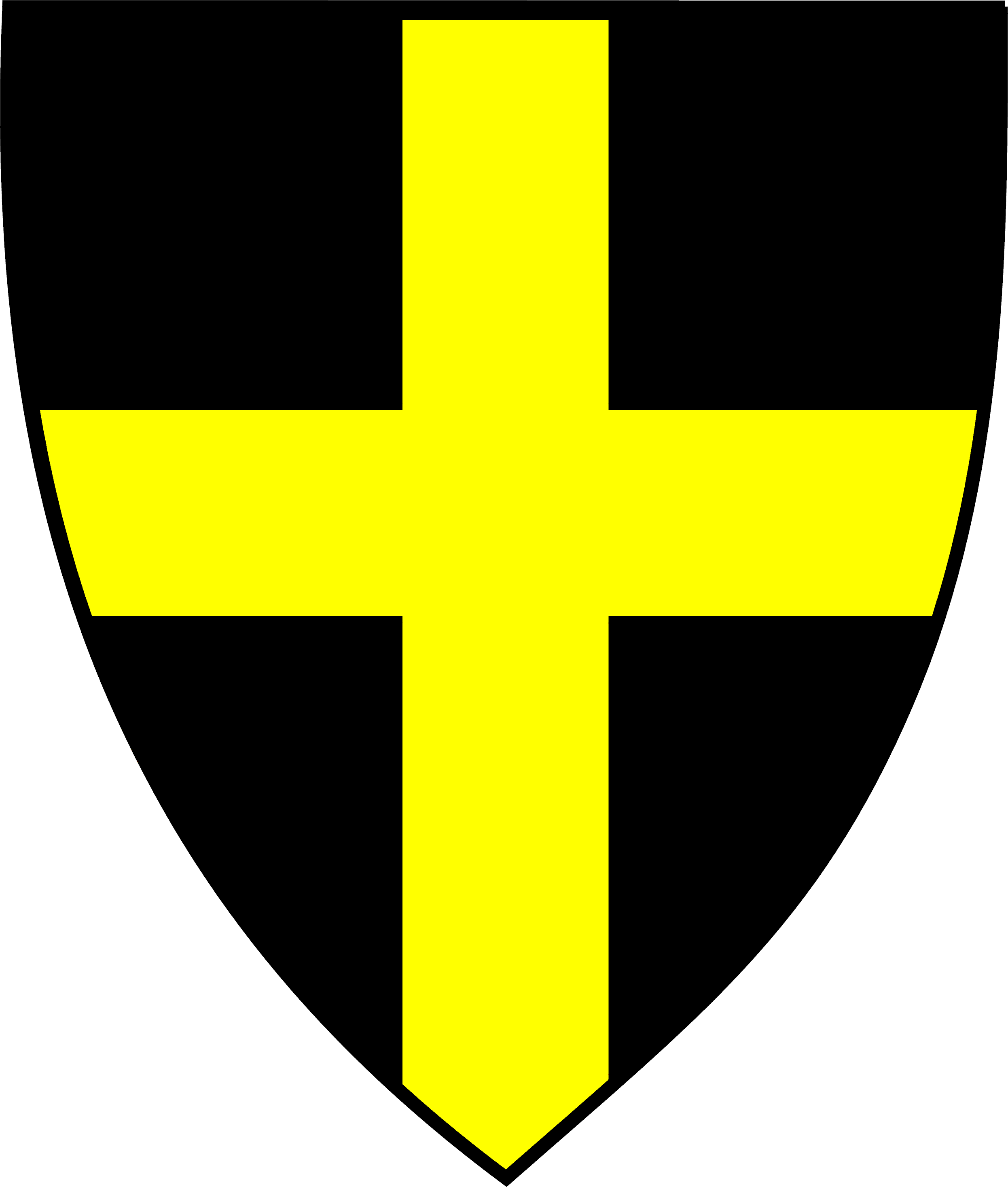
Coat of arms of diocese of Litomyšl

The Roman Catholic Diocese of Litomyšl (Leitomischl in German) was a medieval Latin Catholic bishopric in Litomyšl, Bohemia (then Holy Roman Empire, now Czech Republic) and remains a Latin Catholic titular see.

== History ==
- On 30 April 1344 the Diocese of Litomyšl / Leitomischl (in Czech) / Lutomislen(sis) (Latin adjective) was established as the second bishopric in Bohemia, on territory split off from the first, the then Diocese of Prague.
- In 1474 it was suppressed and its territory merged back into the (meanwhile Metropolitan) Archdiocese of Prague.

=== Ordinaries ===
(all Roman Rite)

Suffragan Bishops of Leitomischl/ Litomyšl

- Jan, Norbertines (O. Praem.) (30 April 1344 – death 1353)
- Petr Jelito (9 June 1368 – 13 October 1371), next Metropolitan Archbishop of Magdeburg (Germany) (13 October 1371 – 1381), Archbishop-Bishop of Olomouc (Moravia, Czech Republic) (1381–1387)
- Jan Soběslav (1380–1387), next Bishop of Olomouc (1387–1387)
- Jan Václav (28 April 1389 – death 1391)
- Johann von Bucka, O. Praem. (1392 – 14 February 1418 see below), next Bishop of Olomouc ([21 September 1416] 14 February 1418 – death 9 October 1430) but also Apostolic Administrator of Litomyšl (14 February 1418 – 1420), Apostolic Administrator of Archdiocese of Prague (13 August 1421 – 9 October 1430), created Cardinal-Priest of S. Ciriaco alle Terme Diocleziane (27 May 1426 – death 9 October 1430), Apostolic Administrator of Vác (Hungary) (1429 – 9 October 1430)
- Apostolic Administrator Johann von Bucka, O. Praem. (see above 14 February 1418 – 1420)
- Aleš of Březí (13 May 1420 – death 1441)
- Matěj Kučka, O. Praem. (1441 – death 1449)
- Jan Bavor, O. Praem. (16 November 1474 – 1478?).

== Titular see ==
In 1970 the diocese was nominally restored as Titular bishopric of Litomyšl / Leitomischl / Lutomislen(sis) (Latin adjective).

It has had the following incumbents, so far of the fitting Episcopal (lowest) rank :

- Jaroslav Škarvada (18 December 1982 – death 14 June 2010), as Auxiliary Bishop of Prague (18 December 1982 – 25 September 2002)
- Pavel Konzbul (21 May 2016 – ...), as Auxiliary Bishop of Brno (21 May 2016 – ...).

== See also ==
- List of Catholic dioceses in the Czech Republic

== Sources and external links ==
- GCatholic, with Google satellite photo - data for all sections
