= Vojtěch Cikrle =

Czech Catholic bishop (born 1946)

His Excellency, The Most Reverend Vojtěch Cikrle
- Bishop Emeritus of Brno
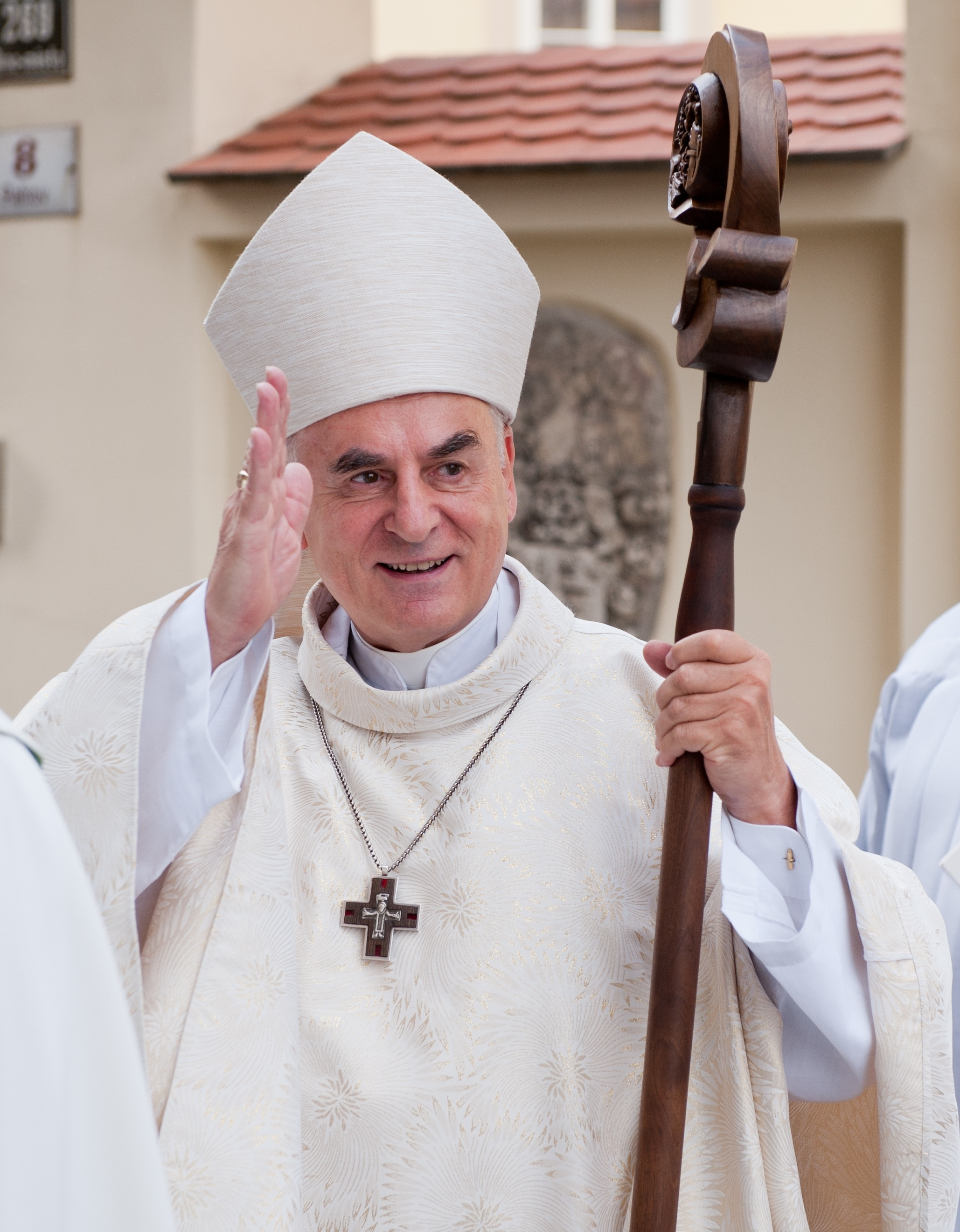
- Bishop Cikrle in 2014
- Church: Catholic Church
- Archdiocese: Olomouc
- Diocese: Brno
- Appointed: 14 February 1990
- Installed: 31 March 1990
- Term ended: 26 May 2022
- Predecessor: Karel Skoupý
- Successor: Pavel Konzbul

Orders
- Ordination: 27 June 1976 by Josef Vrana
- Consecration: 31 March 1990 by František Vaňák, Hans Hermann Groër and Josef Koukl

Personal details
- Born: 20 August 1946 (age 79) Bosonohy, Czechoslovakia
- Motto: Non ego, sed tu ("Not me, but you")
- Coat of arms

Vojtěch Cikrle (born 20 August 1946) is a Czech Catholic prelate who served as the 13th Bishop of Brno from 1990 until 2022. He has been Bishop Emeritus of Brno since the acceptance of his resignation by Pope Francis on 26 May 2022.

== Early life and education ==
Cikrle was born on 20 August 1946 in Bosonohy, now part of Brno. Because his family was persecuted by the communist regime – his father having been imprisoned for political reasons – he was initially unable to pursue higher education. He trained as a foundry worker, later completed secondary education through evening studies, and worked in industry before performing compulsory military service from 1969 to 1971.

In 1971 he entered the Cyril and Methodius Faculty of Theology in Litoměřice and was ordained a priest on 27 June 1976 by Bishop Josef Vrana for Diocese of Brno.

== Priestly ministry ==
Following his ordination, Cikrle served in the parishes of Jaroměřice nad Rokytnou, Jihlava, Znojmo, Slavkov u Brna, Velké Němčice and Starovice. In 1982 he became prefect of the seminary in Litoměřice and was later appointed its rector.

During his priestly ministry he ordained 222 priests, an unusually high number for a Czech diocesan bishop.

== Bishop of Brno ==
On 14 February 1990, Pope John Paul II appointed Cikrle Bishop of Brno after the see had remained vacant for eighteen years. He received episcopal consecration on 31 March 1990 from Archbishop František Vaňák, with Cardinal Hans Hermann Groër and Bishop Josef Koukl serving as co-consecrators.

His episcopate was marked by the post-communist renewal of the Diocese of Brno, including the reorganization of diocesan structures, the establishment of new parishes, support for priestly vocations, and numerous church construction and restoration projects.

Upon reaching the canonical retirement age of 75, Cikrle submitted his resignation to Pope Francis. It was accepted on 26 May 2022, when Auxiliary Bishop Pavel Konzbul succeeded him as diocesan bishop. Since then Cikrle has held the title of Bishop Emeritus of Brno.

== Episcopal succession ==
As bishop, Cikrle was the principal consecrator of:

- Pavel Konzbul (2016)
