= Dlouhá Loučka (Olomouc District) =

- Municipality
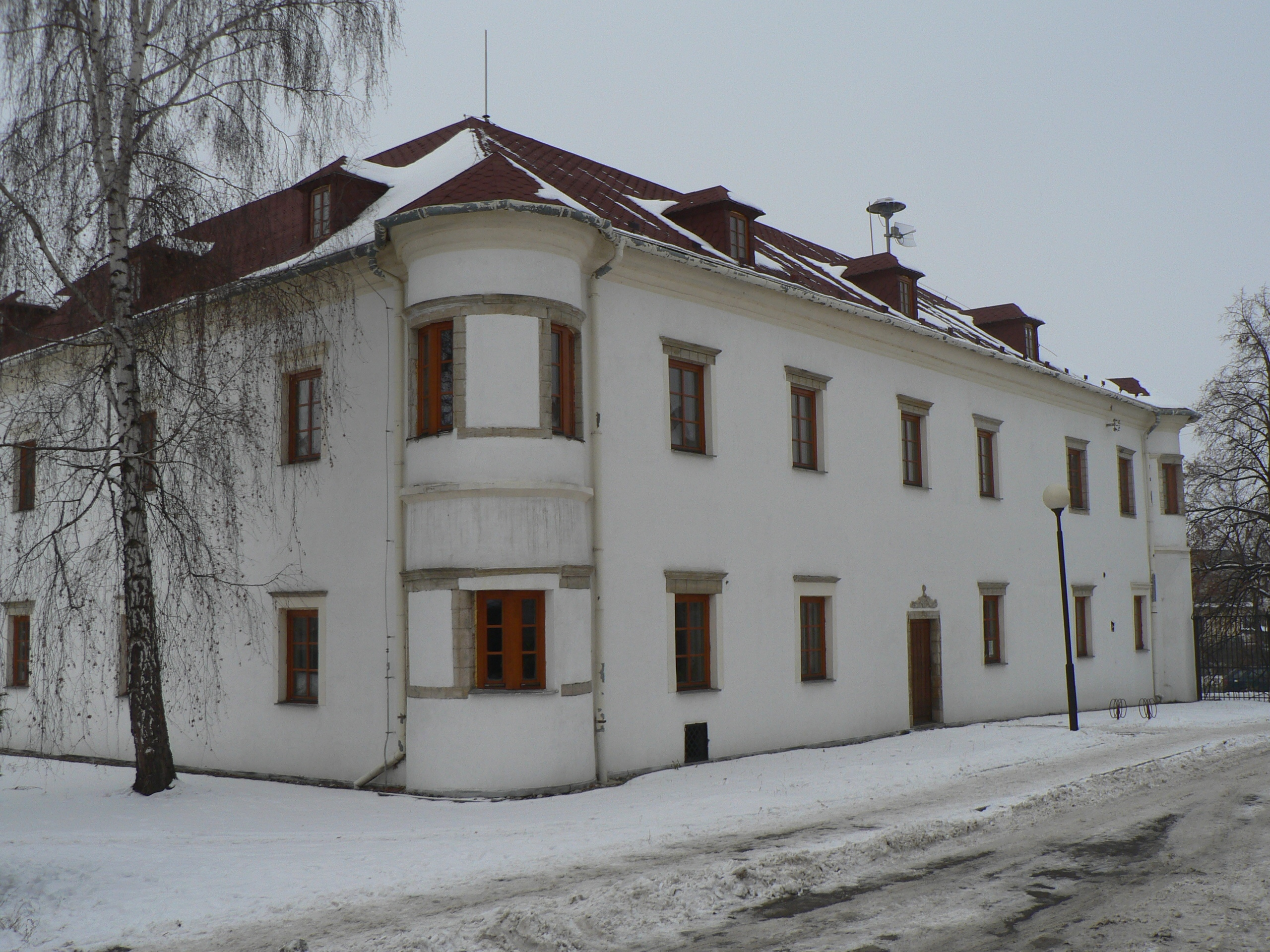
- Renaissance castle, now the municipal office

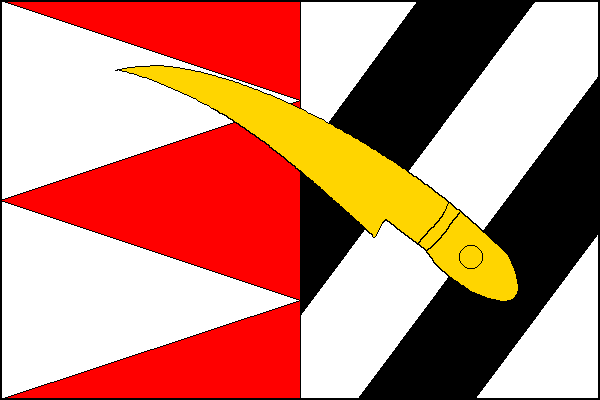
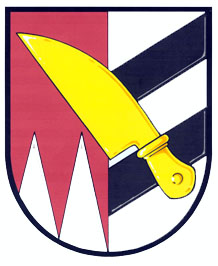
- Flag Coat of arms

- Location in the Czech Republic
- Coordinates: 49°48′59″N 17°10′47″E
- Country: Czech Republic
- Region: Olomouc
- District: Olomouc
- First mentioned: 1301

Area
  - Total: 26.62 km^{2} (10.28 sq mi)
- Elevation: 268 m (879 ft)

Population (2026-01-01)
  - Total: 1,983
  - Density: 74.49/km^{2} (192.9/sq mi)
- Time zone: UTC+1 (CET)
  - Summer (DST): UTC+2 (CEST)
- Postal code: 783 86
- Website: www.dlouhaloucka.cz

Dlouhá Loučka (German: Langendorf) is a municipality and village in Olomouc District in the Olomouc Region of the Czech Republic. It has about 2,000 inhabitants.

== Administrative division ==
Dlouhá Loučka consists of three municipal parts (in brackets population according to the 2021 census):

- Dlouhá Loučka (1,686)
- Křivá (27)
- Plinkout (195)

== Etymology ==
The name literally means 'long little meadow' in Czech, referring to the elongated shape of the village.

== Geography ==
Dlouhá Loučka is located about 25 kilometres (16 mi) north of Olomouc. It lies on the border between the Upper Morava Valley and Nízký Jeseník range. The highest point is a nameless hill at 489 m (1,604 ft) above sea level. The Oslava River flows through the municipality.

== History ==
The first written mention of Dlouhá Loučka is from 1301, when it was owned by a local noble family, known as Lords of Loučka. In 1385, the village was administratively divided into two parts (Horní Dlouhá Loučka and Dolní Dlouhá Loučka), which had different owners. Horní Dlouhá Loučka was annexed to the Sovinec estate, while Dolní Dlouhá Loučka was a property of the Olomouc bishopric.

At the turn of the 19th and 20th centuries, both municipalities reached their peak of population and Dolní Dlouhá Loučka was promoted to a market town. It lost its title after World War II. In 1952, the municipalities were merged under the name Dlouhá Loučka. In 1960, the municipalities of Plinkout and Křivá were annexed to Dlouhá Loučka.

== Demographics ==
Historical population

Year	Pop.	±%
1869	3,055	—
1880	3,172	+3.8%
1890	3,126	−1.5%
1900	3,107	−0.6%
1910	3,140	+1.1%

Year	Pop.	±%
1921	2,975	−5.3%
1930	2,929	−1.5%
1950	2,129	−27.3%
1961	2,190	+2.9%
1970	2,143	−2.1%

Year	Pop.	±%
1980	2,031	−5.2%
1991	1,862	−8.3%
2001	1,876	+0.8%
2011	1,868	−0.4%
2021	1,908	+2.1%

Source: Censuses

== Transport ==
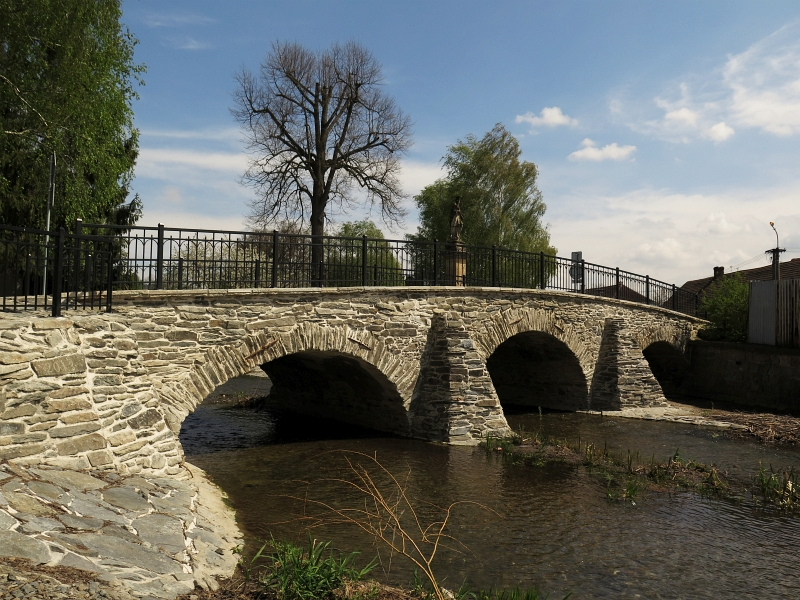
Svatojánský most bridge

There are no railways or major roads passing through the municipality.

== Sights ==
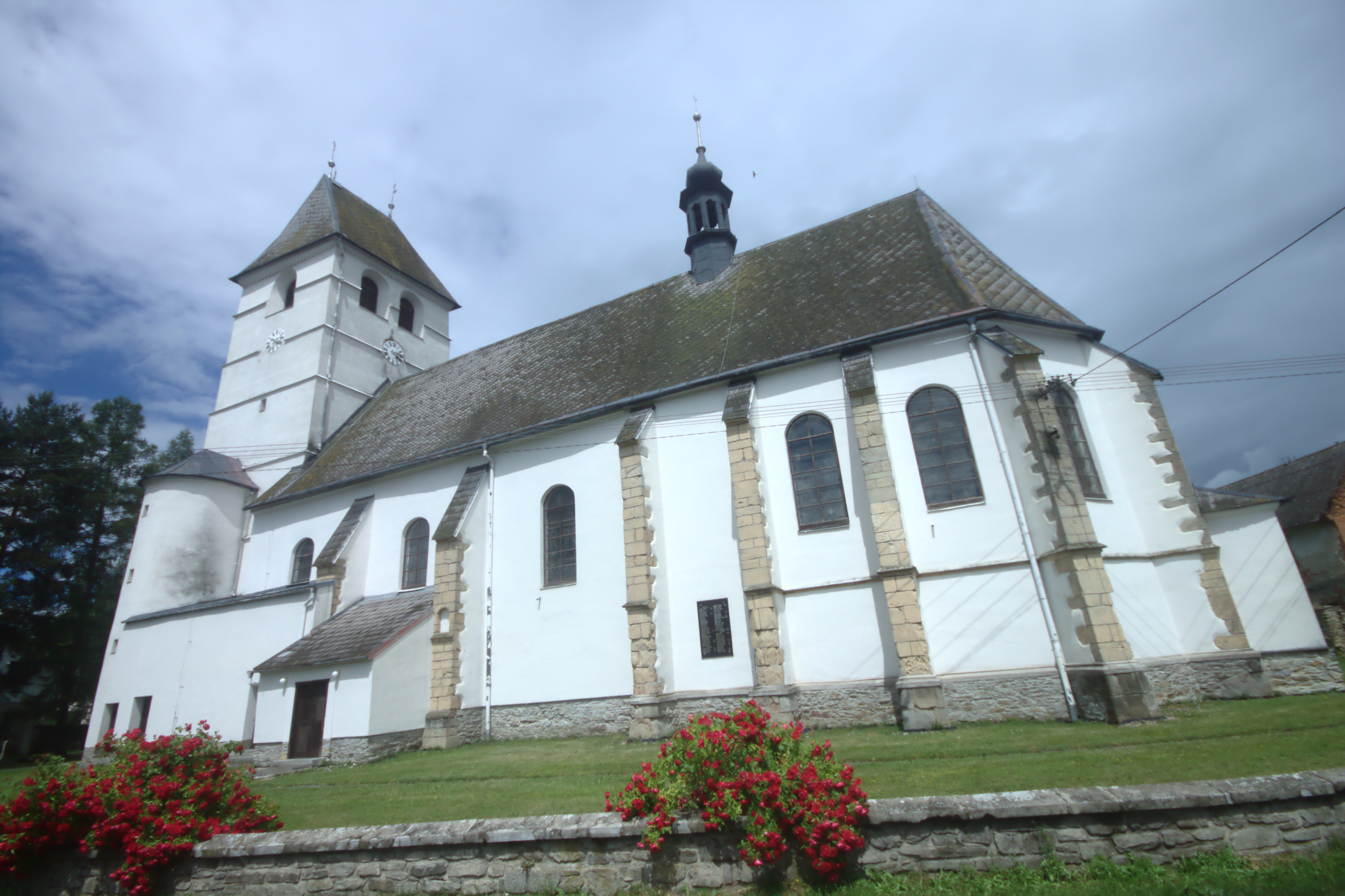
Church of Saint Bartholomew

The most important monument of Dlouhá Loučka is the Church of Saint Bartholomew. It has a core from the 15th century, but its present appearance is a result of younger reconstructions.

A notable building is the Renaissance fortress from the turn of the 16th and 17th centuries, also called Dolní Dlouhá Loučka Castle. Today it housed the municipal office.

Horní Dlouhá Loučka Castle was built in 1708–1709 and rebuilt in the Neoclassical style in the first half of the 19th century. It is surrounded by a landscape park. Due to its dilapidated condition, the building's status of a cultural monument was revoked.

A technical monument is the Baroque three-arch stone bridge called Svatojánský most ('Saint John's Bridge'). It was probably built in 1712. It is decorated with a statue of Saint John of Nepomuk.

== Notable people ==
- Lev Skrbenský z Hříště (1863–1938), Cardinal of the Catholic Church; died here
