= Basilica of Our Lady of the Assumption and St. Nicholas =

Basilica of the Assumption of the Virgin Mary and St. Nicholas
- Bazilika Nanebevzetí Panny Marie a svatého Mikuláše
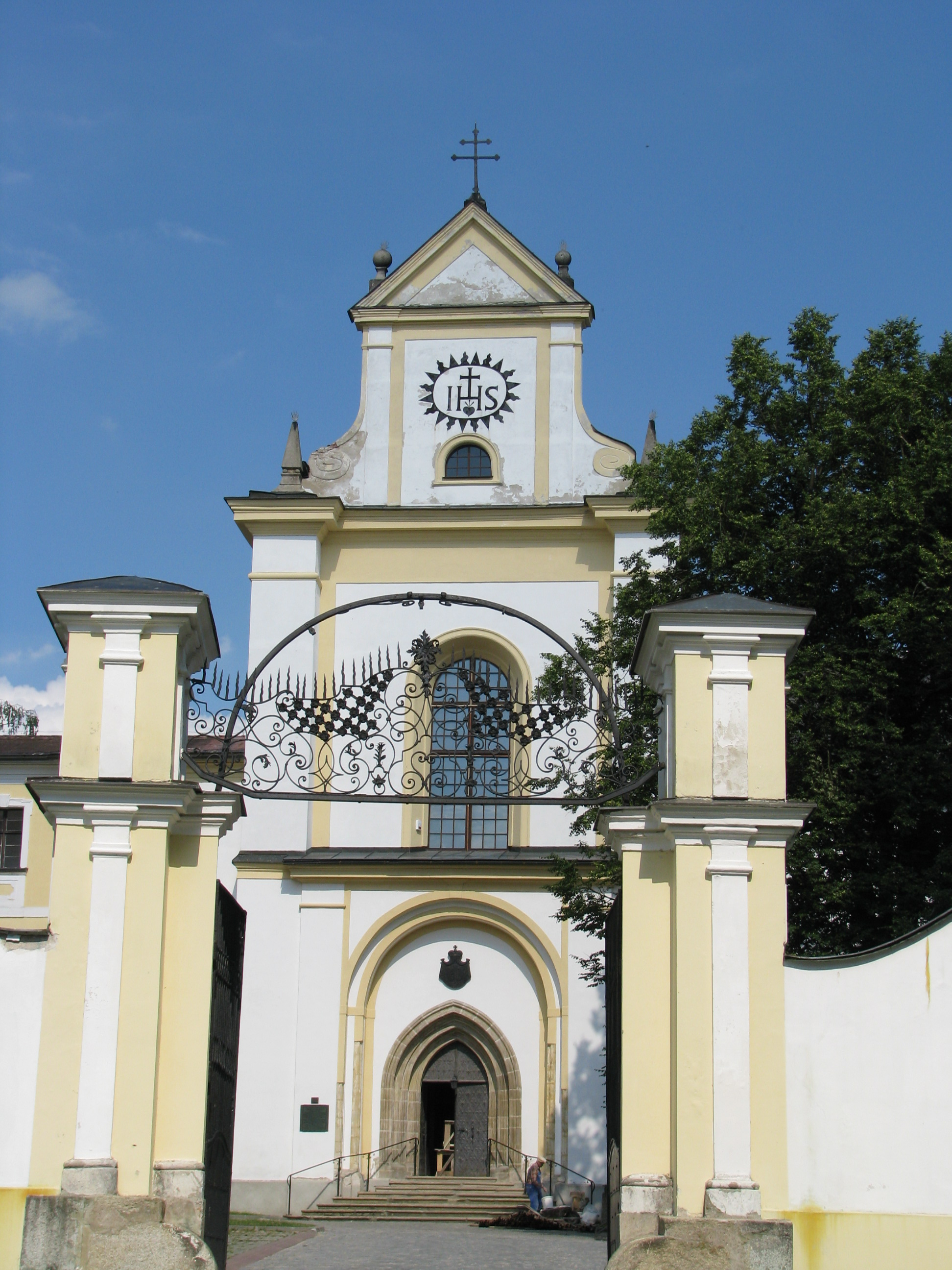

- Location in the Czech Republic
- 49°34′59″N 15°56′16″E
- Location: Žďár nad Sázavou
- Country: Czech Republic
- Denomination: Roman Catholic
- Website: www.zdarskefarnosti.cz/indexklaster.aspx

History
- Status: Active
- Founded: 1252
- Dedication: Assumption of Mary and Saint Nicholas

Architecture
- Functional status: Parish church
- Style: Baroque

Administration
- Diocese: Brno
- Parish: Žďár

Clergy
- Archbishop: Vojtěch Cikrle

The Basilica of the Assumption of the Virgin Mary and Saint Nicholas (Czech: Bazilika Nanebevzetí Panny Marie a svatého Mikuláše) is a church in Žďár nad Sázavou in the Czech Republic. Since its foundation it has been part of the Cistercian monastery in Žďár nad Sázavou. The Cistercian monastery existed after 1250 thanks to magnate of Křižanov whose name was Přibyslav. The church was elevated to the honour of a Minor basilica on 5 January 2009.

== History ==
Historical and political situation brought together three very important people of our middle-age history. Those three were husbands of Přibyslav's daughters. The husband of their daughter Eufemia – Boček of Zbraslav, finished the foundation of the monastery. After his death his brother-in-law, the husband of Eliška, Smil of Lichtenburk took care of the monastery. Přibyslav's eldest daughter Zdislava left with Havel of Lemberk and she died far away – in Podještědí. She is one of the Czech saints.

The Cistercians with the leading authority of Saint Bernard of Clairvaux pointing towards monastic discipline founded monasteries in the places which were difficult to access since they wanted to come closer to God with their hard work. They chose a border forest between Moravia and Bohemia. The wall painting in the baptismal chapel shows the year 1462 – Pope Pius II allowing abbots of Žďár to use pontifical regalia. The church itself was founded on the life-giving spring and afterwards it was called Fons Beatae Mariae Virginis – the spring of the Virgin Mary. Studniční Chapel was part of a cloister and the debris of garden of Eden show the period of prosperity and decay of this place. The statue of the Well Virgin Mary is very important for the monastery. It is to be seen on the side altar in southern aisle. This early Gothic masterpiece was brought by monks of Pomuk. They were running away from the Hussite fury.

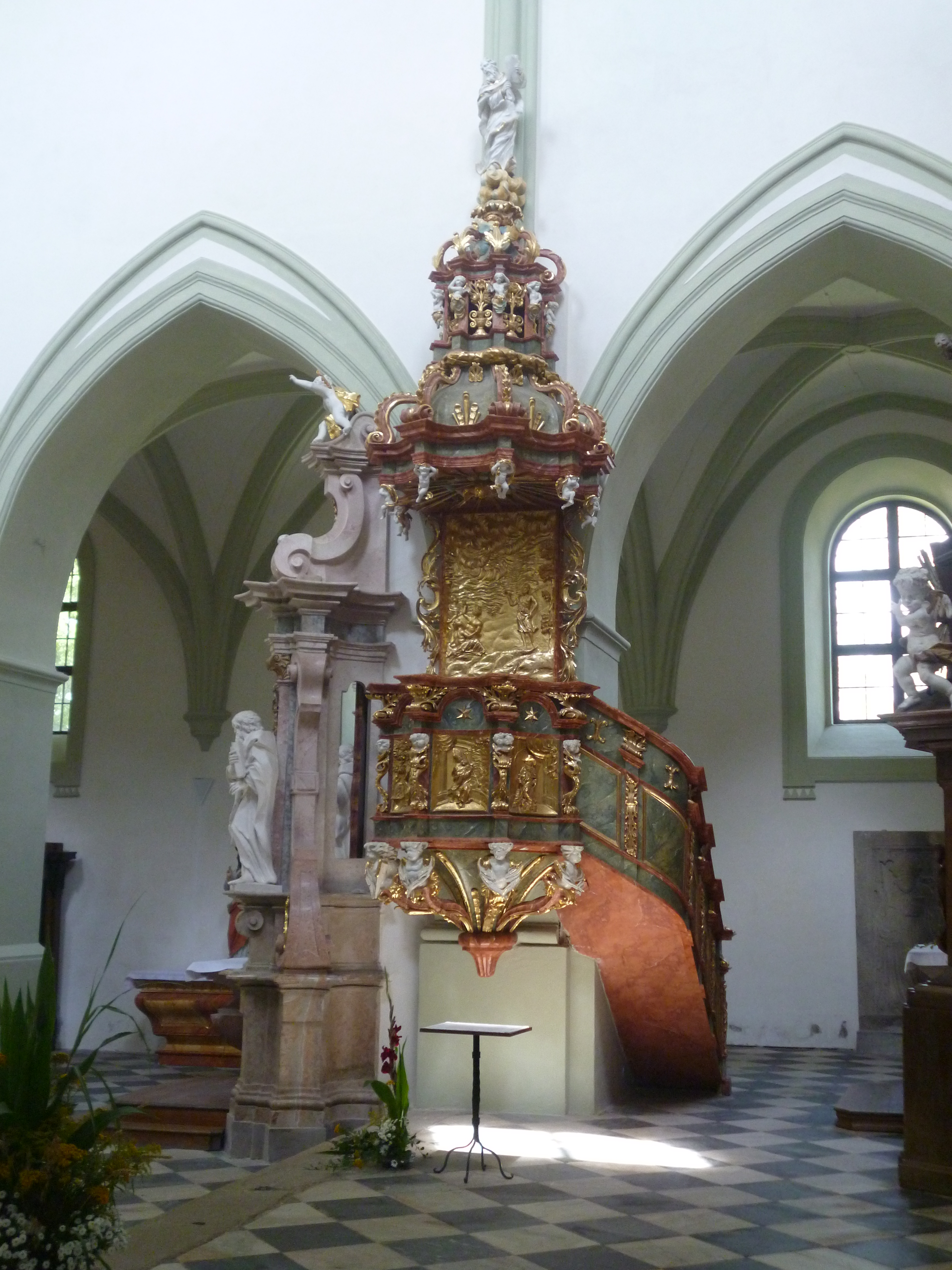
Pulpit of the basilica

After the year 1705 when Václav Vejmluva became a head of the religious communities came the time when there was an architectonic and artistic flourish of the monastery. The masterpiece of this period is the altar of the Annunciation of the Virgin Mary whose concept was made by Jan Santini Aichel. The dominant of this is the dualistic picture of the Annunciation of the Virgin Mary. The author of this painting is Michael Willmann. The decoration of the monastery was done by very talented Řehoř Theny. This sculptor is the author of the altar in the south chapel of Annunciation of the Virgin Mary. This sculpture shows the moment when archangel Gabriel annunciated the Virgin Mary that she would have a son. The light is falling onto Mary's face and the repose urges the visitor to stay still for a while. A perfect example of Santini's creative inventiveness is a built-in music stand and Empire dominant organ in the transept of the church. This rare musical instrument comes from the workshop of Jan David Sieber.
