= Bartošovice =

- Municipality
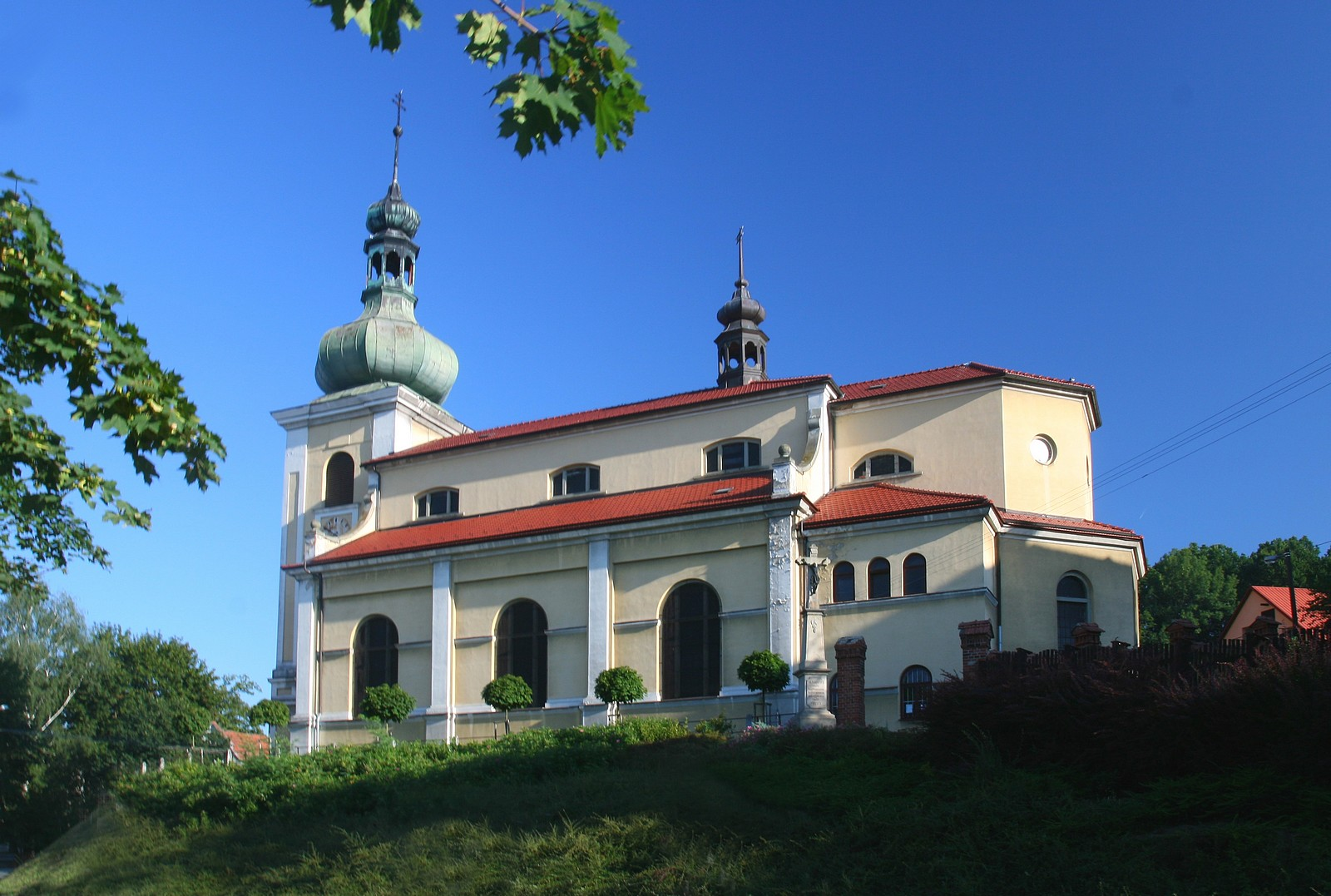
- Church of Saints Andrew, Peter and Paul

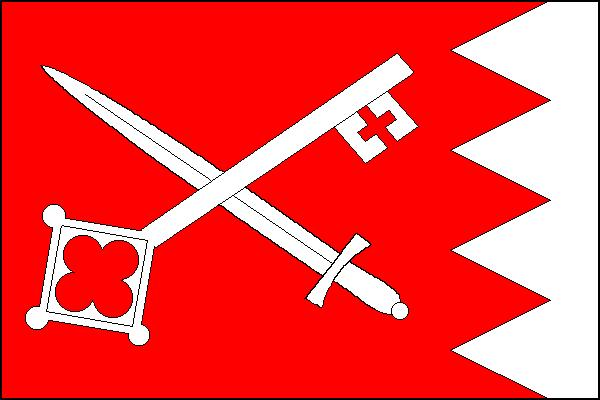
- Flag Coat of arms

- Location in the Czech Republic
- Coordinates: 49°40′8″N 18°3′17″E
- Country: Czech Republic
- Region: Moravian-Silesian
- District: Nový Jičín
- First mentioned: 1383

Area
  - Total: 24.15 km^{2} (9.32 sq mi)
- Elevation: 247 m (810 ft)

Population (2026-01-01)
  - Total: 1,714
  - Density: 70.97/km^{2} (183.8/sq mi)
- Time zone: UTC+1 (CET)
  - Summer (DST): UTC+2 (CEST)
- Postal code: 742 54
- Website: www.bartosovice.cz

Bartošovice (German: Partschendorf) is a municipality and village in Nový Jičín District in the Moravian-Silesian Region of the Czech Republic. It has about 1,700 inhabitants.

== Administrative division ==
Bartošovice consists of two municipal parts (in brackets population according to the 2021 census):

- Bartošovice (1,334)
- Hukovice (348)

== Demographics ==
Historical population
Year	Pop.	±%
1869	2,374	—
1880	2,592	+9.2%
1890	2,599	+0.3%
1900	2,638	+1.5%
1910	2,677	+1.5%
1921	2,534	−5.3%
1930	2,404	−5.1%
1950	1,844	−23.3%
1961	1,968	+6.7%
1970	1,865	−5.2%
1980	1,605	−13.9%
1991	1,464	−8.8%
2001	1,605	+9.6%
2011	1,633	+1.7%
2021	1,682	+3.0%
Source: Censuses

== Notable people ==
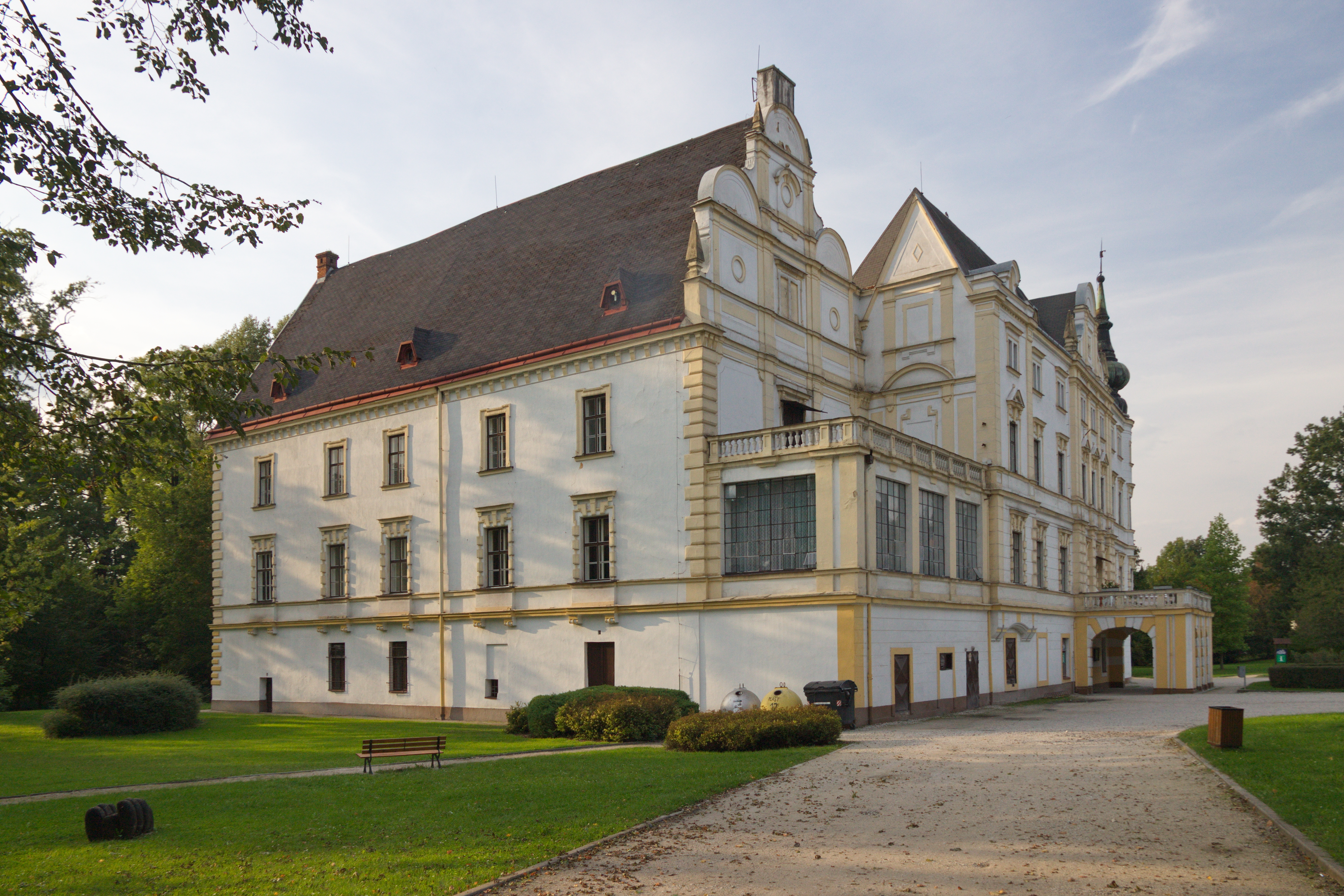
Bartošovice Castle

- Lev Skrbenský z Hříště (1863–1938), Cardinal of the Catholic Church
