= Norbert Klein (bishop) =

Hochmeister Norbert Klein
- Hochmeister; Bishop of Brno
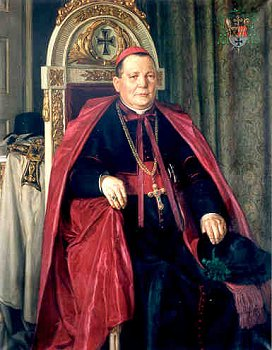
- Bishop Norbert Jan Nepomuk Klein
- Appointed: 7 December 1916
- Predecessor: Pavel Huyn
- Successor: Josef Kupka

Orders
- Consecration: 28 January 1917 by Lev Skrbenský z Hříště

Personal details
- Born: 25 October 1866 Brunzeif, Austrian Silesia
- Died: 10 March 1933 (aged 66) Bruntál, Czechoslovakia
- Buried: Bruntál, Czechoslovakia
- Denomination: Roman Catholic

Norbert Klein (25 October 1866 in Brunzeif, Austrian Silesia – 10 March 1933 in Bruntál, Czechoslovakia) was Bishop of Brno from 1916 to 1926 and 59th Grand Master of the Teutonic Order from 1923 to 1933.

== Life ==
Klein began his theological studies in 1885 at Olomouc. He continued for two years before entering the novitiate of the Teutonic Order in 1887. On 27 July 1890 he was ordained to the priesthood and in 1892 he made his solemn profession in the order. In 1903 he was named Prior of Opava. On 7 December 1916 he was appointed to be Bishop of Brno. On 28 January 1917 he was ordained bishop. On 30 April 1923 he became the first clerical grand master of the Teutonic Order when Archduke Eugen of Austria resigned in order to ensure that the order retained its properties in Austria and Czechoslovakia which were threatened with confiscation by the respective governments.

On 4 January 1926 Klein resigned as Bishop of Brno and was named Titular Bishop of Syene. Due to the difficult relations between the Vatican and Czechoslovakia the see remained vacant (sede vacante) for more than five years.

In 1929 Klein transformed the Order into a monastic order.

Klein died on 10 March 1933, and is buried in Bruntál. After his death Paul Heider became grand master for three years; upon Heider's death, Klein’s nephew Robert Schälzky became grand master.

Religious titles
| Preceded by Pavel Huyn | Bishop of Brno; 1916–1926 | Succeeded by Josef Kupka |
| Preceded by Archduke Eugen of Austria | Grand Master of the Teutonic Knights; 1923–1933 | Succeeded by Paul Heider |
