= Ryžoviště =

- Municipality
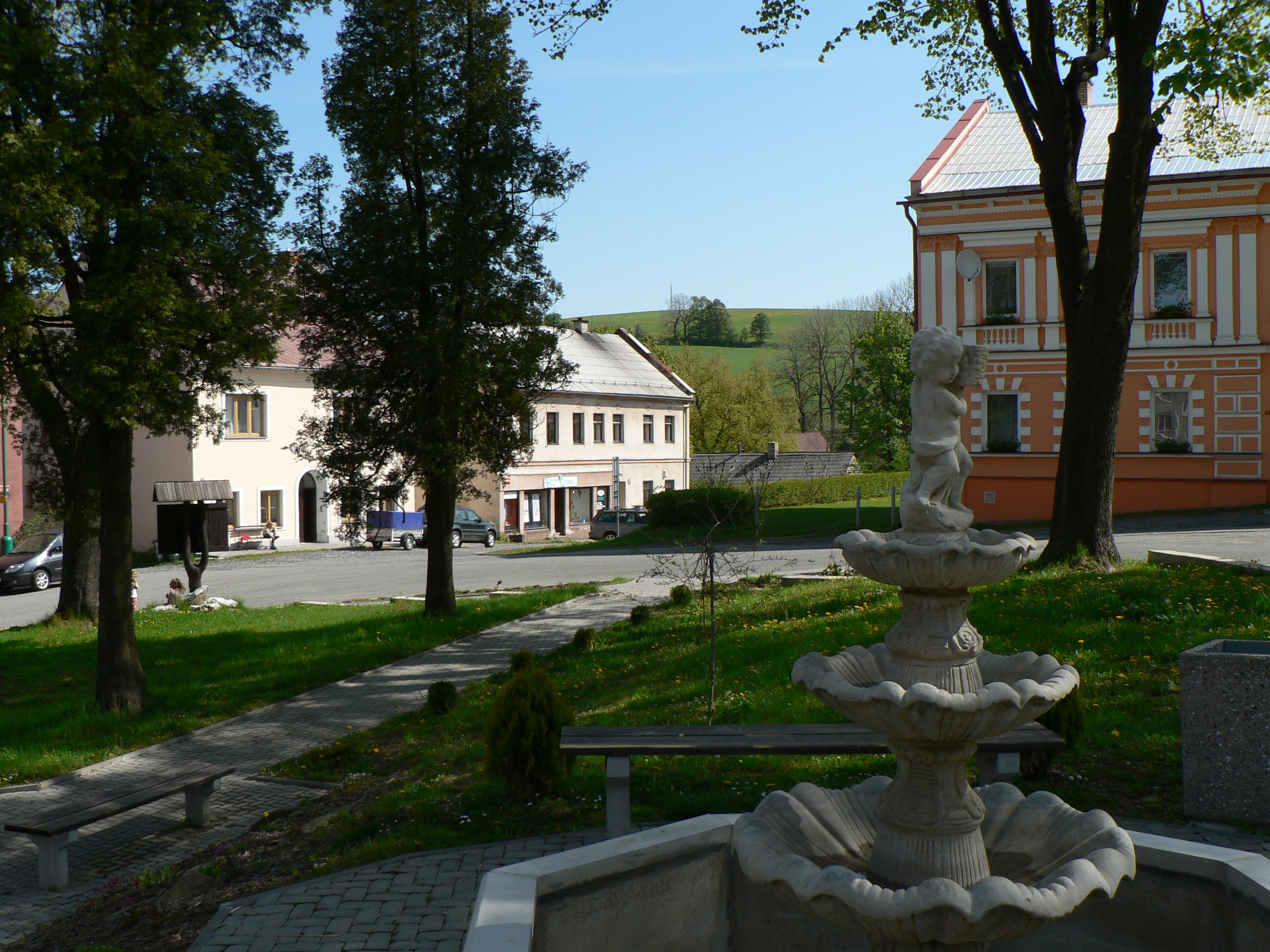
- Market square

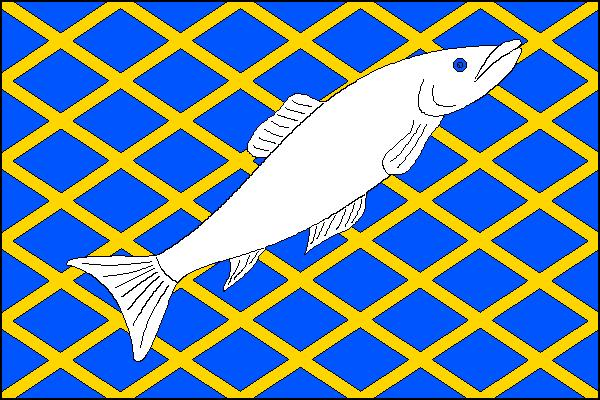
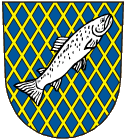
- Flag Coat of arms

- Location in the Czech Republic
- Coordinates: 49°52′32″N 17°21′30″E
- Country: Czech Republic
- Region: Moravian-Silesian
- District: Bruntál
- First mentioned: 1317

Area
  - Total: 18.80 km^{2} (7.26 sq mi)
- Elevation: 595 m (1,952 ft)

Population (2026-01-01)
  - Total: 584
  - Density: 31.1/km^{2} (80.5/sq mi)
- Time zone: UTC+1 (CET)
  - Summer (DST): UTC+2 (CEST)
- Postal code: 793 56
- Website: www.ryzoviste.cz

Ryžoviště (formerly Brunzejf; German: Braunseifen) is a municipality and village in Bruntál District in the Moravian-Silesian Region of the Czech Republic. It has about 600 inhabitants.

== Demographics ==
Historical population
Year	Pop.	±%
1869	2,714	—
1880	2,540	−6.4%
1890	2,563	+0.9%
1900	2,104	−17.9%
1910	1,918	−8.8%
1921	1,680	−12.4%
1930	1,604	−4.5%
1950	739	−53.9%
1961	734	−0.7%
1970	735	+0.1%
1980	821	+11.7%
1991	710	−13.5%
2001	679	−4.4%
2011	597	−12.1%
2021	600	+0.5%
Source: Censuses

== Notable people ==
- Norbert Klein (1866–1933), bishop of Brno, Grand Master of the Teutonic Order
