= Pavel Huyn =

Historical Roman Catholic Clergyman

- Archbishop of Prague
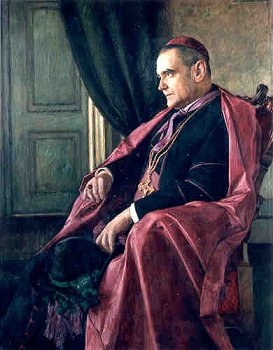
- Church: Catholic Church
- Archdiocese: Archdiocese of Prague
- In office: 4 October 1916 – 6 September 1919
- Predecessor: Lev Skrbenský z Hříště
- Successor: František Kordač
- Other post: Patriarch of Alexandria (1921-1946)
- Previous posts: Titular Archbishop of Serdica (1919-1921); Bishop of Brno (1904-1916)

Orders
- Ordination: 7 June 1892
- Consecration: 26 June 1904 by Franziskus von Sales Bauer

Personal details
- Born: 17 February 1868 Brno, Kingdom of Bohemia, Cisleithania, Austria-Hungary
- Died: 1 October 1946 (aged 78) Bolzano, South Tyrol, Italy
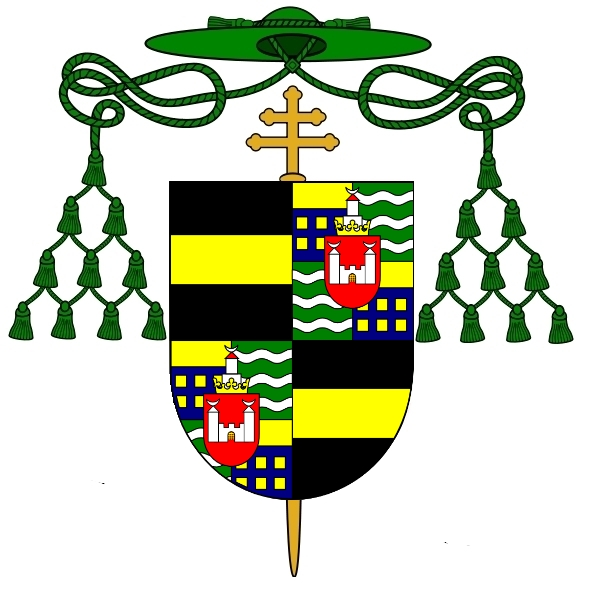
- Coat of arms

Pavel hrabě Huyn (German: Paul Graf Huyn) (17 February 1868 in Brno – 1 October 1946 in Bolzano) was a Moravian-German Roman Catholic clergyman. He was bishop of Brno from 1904 to 1916 and archbishop of Prague from 1916 to 1919.

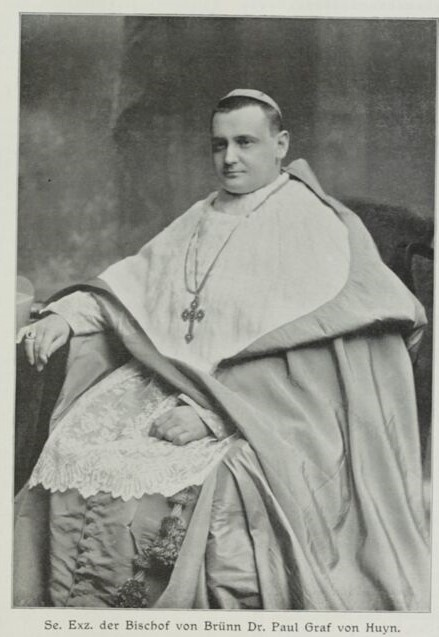
Pavel Huyn, as bishop of Brno, in 1914

Archbishop Huyn was of aristocratic birth in the Hapsburg Austro-Hungarian Empire, so he dreaded an independent Czechoslavakia.

The new Czechoslovak government demanded that the majority of incumbent bishops be replaced and systematically implemented a persecutory anti-church policy. Due to this imposition, at least other nine bishops (including Cardinal Lev Skrbenský z Hříště, Archbishop of Olomouc and his predecessor in Prague) were replaced or forced out to resign. After 1921 only two pre-war bishops were allowed to remain.

He became later Titular Archbishop of Serdica (1919–1921) and Latin Patriarch of Alexandria (1921–1946).

He was also assistant to the papal throne.

He was brother of Count Karl Georg Huyn, the Governor of the Kingdom of Galicia and Lodomeria in 1917–1918.

Religious titles
Preceded by Franziskus von Sales Bauer	Bishop of Brno; 1904–1916	Succeeded by Norbert Klein
Preceded by Lev Skrbenský	Archbishop of Prague; 1916–1919	Succeeded by František Kordač
