= Franziskus von Sales Bauer =

Austro-Hungarian Cardinal (1841-1915)

His Eminence František Salesky Bauer
- Archbishop of Olomouc
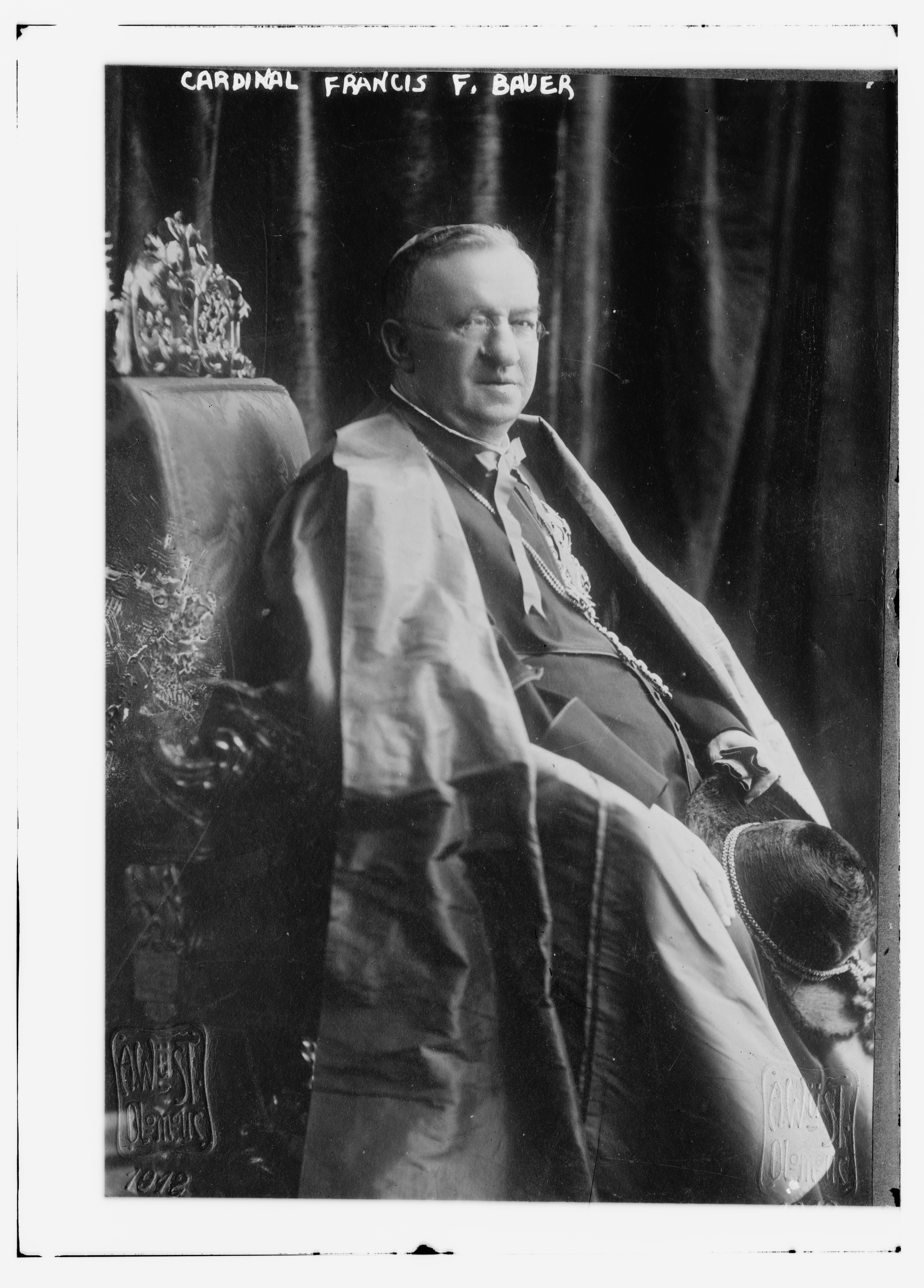
- The-then Bishop Bauer pictured in 1900.
- Church: Roman Catholic Church
- Archdiocese: Olomouc
- See: Olomouc
- Appointed: 10 May 1904
- Term ended: 25 November 1915
- Predecessor: Theodor Kohn
- Successor: Lev Skrbenský z Hříště
- Other post: Cardinal-Priest of San Girolamo dei Croati (1912-15)
- Previous post: Bishop of Brno (1882-1904)

Orders
- Ordination: 19 July 1863
- Consecration: 15 August 1882 by Friedrich Egon von Fürstenberg
- Created cardinal: 27 November 1911 by Pope Pius X
- Rank: Cardinal-Priest

Personal details
- Born: František Salesky Bauer; 26 January 1841 Hrachovec, Vsetín, Zlín, Kingdom of Bohemia
- Died: 25 November 1915 (aged 74) Olomouc, Kingdom of Bohemia
- Buried: Saint Wenceslas Cathedral
- Motto: Chci kráčet ve stopách svatého Cyrila a Metoděje ("I want to follow in the footsteps of Saints Cyril and Methodius")
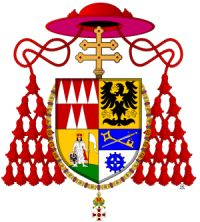
- Coat of arms

Styles of Franziskus von Sales Bauer
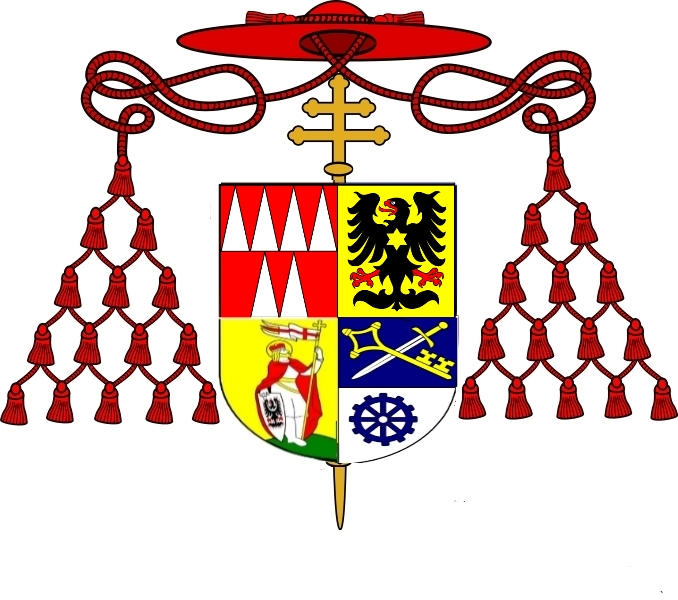
- Reference style: His Eminence
- Spoken style: Your Eminence
- Informal style: Cardinal
- See: Olomouc

Franziskus von Sales Bauer (26 January 1841 – 25 November 1915) was an Austro-Hungarian Cardinal of the Roman Catholic Church. He served as Bishop of Brno (1882–1904) and later Archbishop of Olomouc from 1904 until his death, and was elevated to the cardinalate in 1911. He was also deputy of Moravian Diet.

== Biography ==
Born in Hrachovec (now part of Valašské Meziříčí) in Moravia, Franziskus Bauer received the Sacrament of Confirmation in 1852, and studied at the seminary at the Faculty of Theology in Olomouc. He received the first tonsure and minor orders on 14 December 1859. Following his elevation to the subdiaconate (20 December 1862) and the diaconate (28 February 1863), Bauer was ordained to the priesthood on 19 July 1863, for the Archdiocese of Olomouc.

He then served as a cooperator, and later second chaplain in the parish of Vyškov, for the archdiocese until February 1865, whence he began teaching at the Theological Faculty of Olomouc. Bauer finished his studies in 1869, obtaining his doctorate in theology on 30 June that year. He became Dean of the Theological Faculty in 1869 as well. He became a professor at the University of Prague on 19 September 1873, and later the Rector of the Archiepiscopal Seminary of Prague in 1879.

On 3 July 1883, Bauer was appointed Bishop of Brno by Pope Leo XIII. He received his episcopal consecration on the following August 15 from Cardinal Archbishop Friedrich Egon von Fürstenberg of Olomouc, with Bishops Gustav von Belript-Tissac and Karol Prucha serving as co-consecrators. Bauer was later named Archbishop of Olomouc on 10 May 1904. In virtue of this position, he was also prince, duke of Hotzenplotz, counselor to the emperor, and senator.

Pope Pius X created him Cardinal Priest of S. Girolamo degli Schiavoni in the consistory of 27 November 1911. Although eligible, Bauer did not participate in the 1914 papal conclave due to ill health.

Franziskus von Sales Bauer died in Olomouc at age 74. He is buried in the metropolitan cathedral of Olomouc.

Catholic Church titles
Preceded by Karel Nöttig	Bishop of Brno; 1882–1904	Succeeded by Pavel Huyn
Preceded by Theodor Kohn	Archbishop of Olomouc; 1904–1915	Succeeded by Lev Skrbenský z Hříště
