= Bojanovice (Znojmo District) =

- Municipality
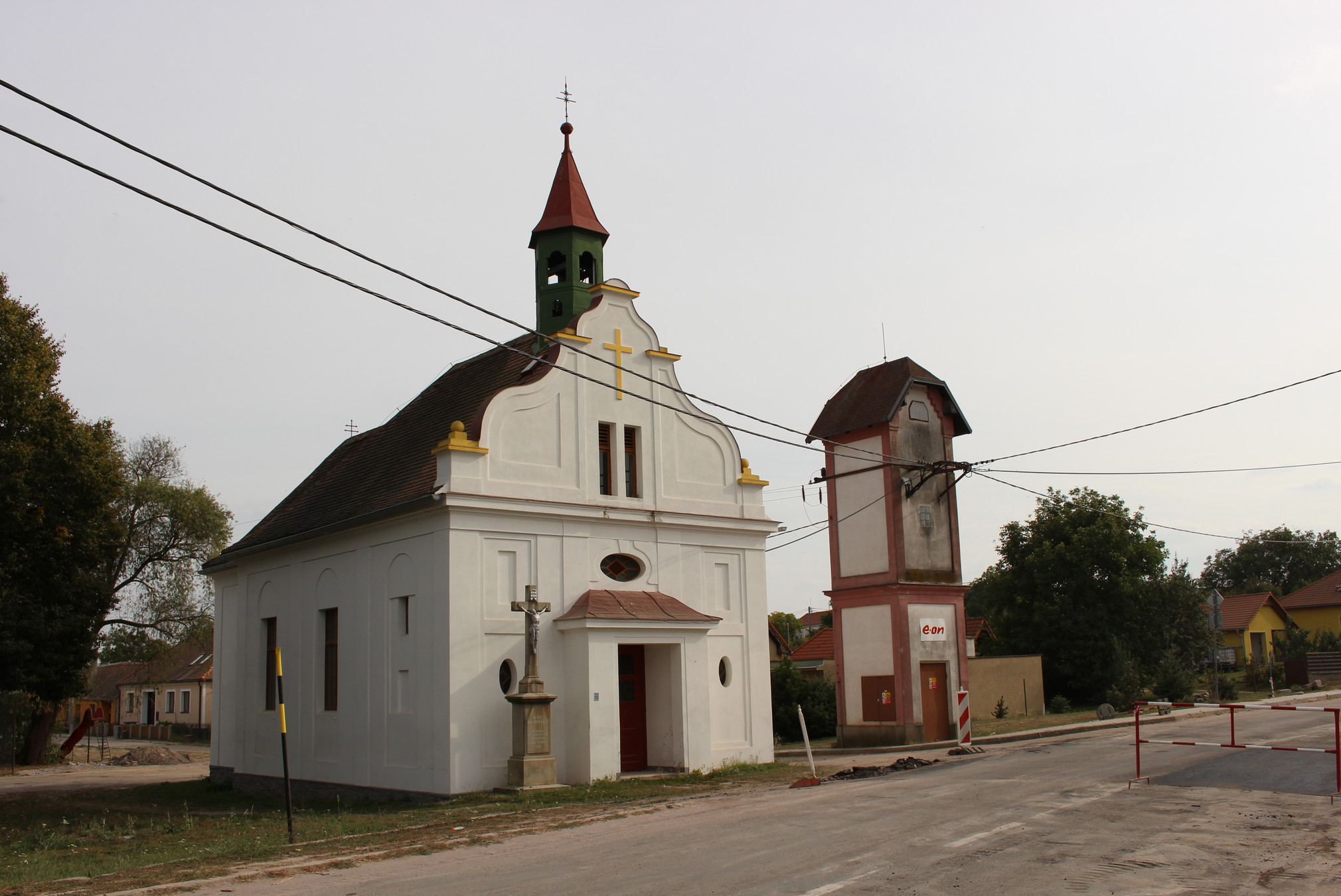
- Chapel of Saint John of Nepomuk

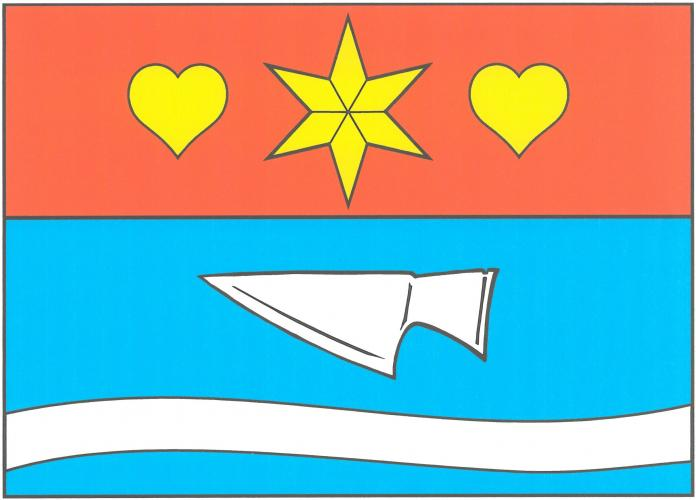
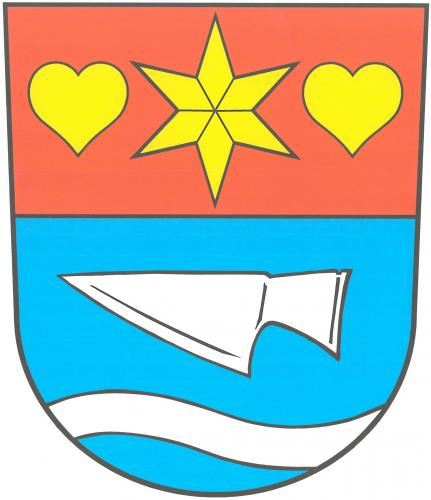
- Flag Coat of arms

- Location in the Czech Republic
- Coordinates: 48°58′6″N 15°59′21″E
- Country: Czech Republic
- Region: South Moravian
- District: Znojmo
- First mentioned: 1227

Area
  - Total: 11.41 km^{2} (4.41 sq mi)
- Elevation: 345 m (1,132 ft)

Population (2026-01-01)
  - Total: 184
  - Density: 16.1/km^{2} (41.8/sq mi)
- Time zone: UTC+1 (CET)
  - Summer (DST): UTC+2 (CEST)
- Postal code: 671 53
- Website: www.obec-bojanovice.cz

Bojanovice is a municipality and village in Znojmo District in the South Moravian Region of the Czech Republic. It has about 200 inhabitants.

Bojanovice lies approximately 13 kilometres (8 mi) north of Znojmo, 54 km (34 mi) south-west of Brno, and 169 km (105 mi) south-east of Prague.

== Demographics ==
Historical population
Year	Pop.	±%
1869	293	—
1880	304	+3.8%
1890	337	+10.9%
1900	371	+10.1%
1910	336	−9.4%
1921	354	+5.4%
1930	337	−4.8%
1950	246	−27.0%
1961	244	−0.8%
1970	231	−5.3%
1980	210	−9.1%
1991	166	−21.0%
2001	166	+0.0%
2011	183	+10.2%
2021	180	−1.6%
Source: Censuses
