= Zlobice =

- Municipality
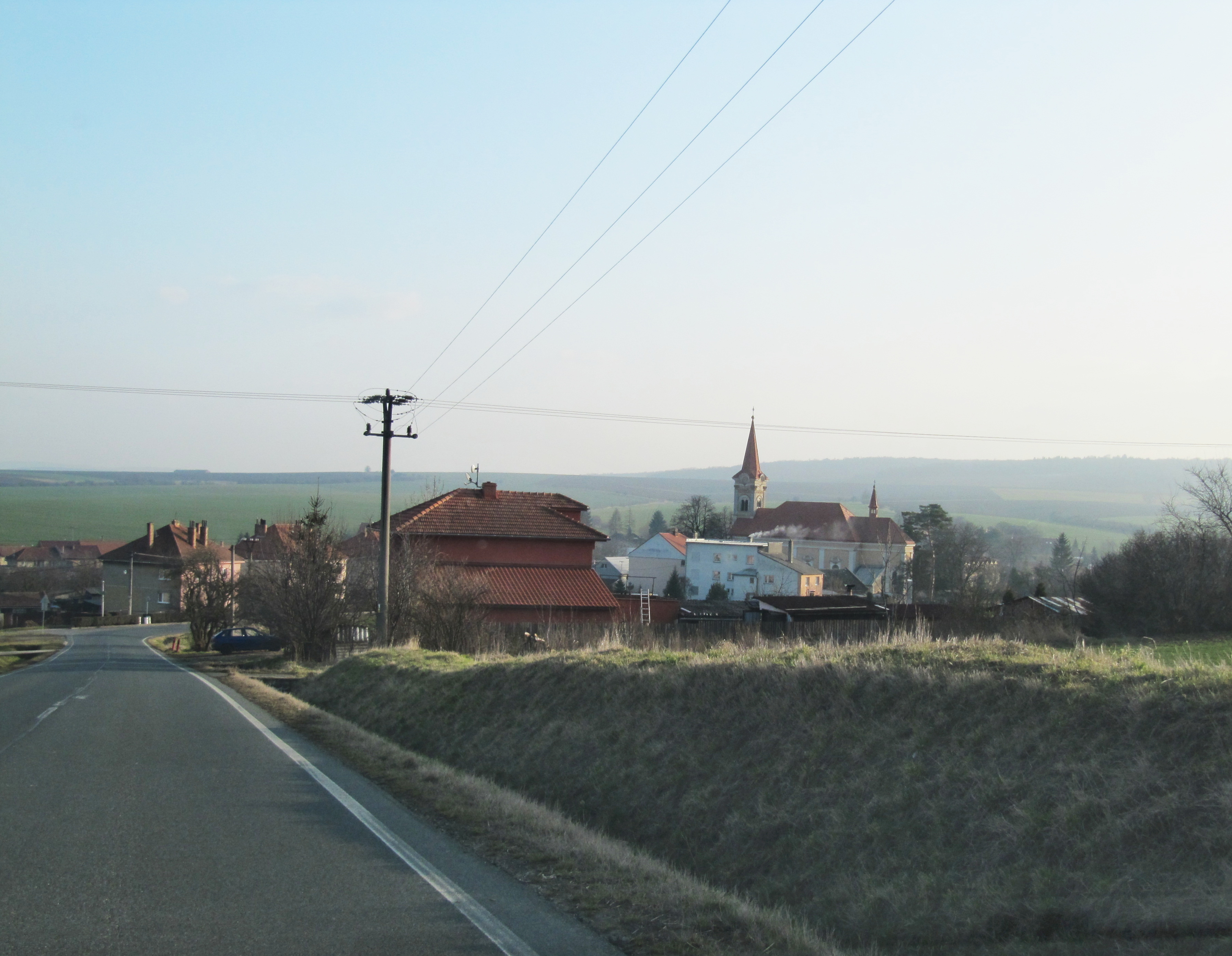
- General view

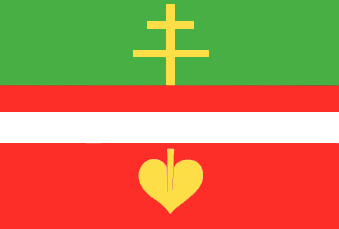
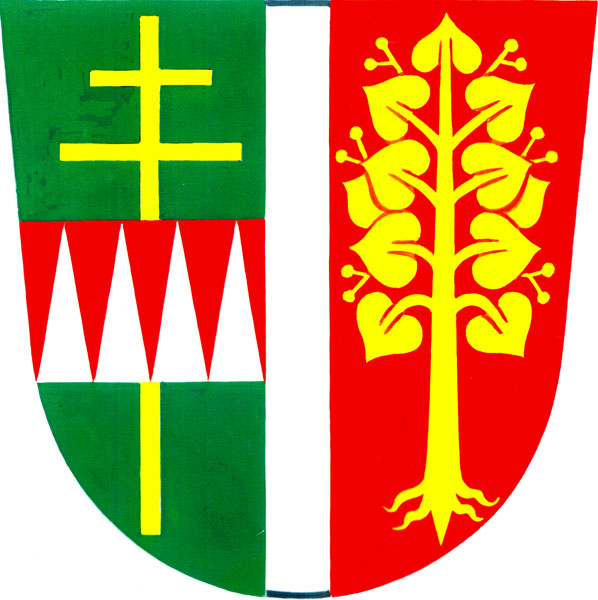
- Flag Coat of arms

- Location in the Czech Republic
- Coordinates: 49°18′7″N 17°18′45″E
- Country: Czech Republic
- Region: Zlín
- District: Kroměříž
- First mentioned: 1078

Area
  - Total: 6.64 km^{2} (2.56 sq mi)
- Elevation: 229 m (751 ft)

Population (2026-01-01)
  - Total: 589
  - Density: 88.7/km^{2} (230/sq mi)
- Time zone: UTC+1 (CET)
  - Summer (DST): UTC+2 (CEST)
- Postal code: 768 31
- Website: www.zlobice-bojanovice.cz

Zlobice is a municipality and village in Kroměříž District in the Zlín Region of the Czech Republic. It has about 600 inhabitants.

== Administrative division ==
Zlobice consists of two municipal parts (in brackets population according to the 2021 census):

- Zlobice (446)
- Bojanovice (150)

== Geography ==
Zlobice is located about 5 kilometres (3 mi) west of Kroměříž, 26 km (16 mi) northwest of Zlín and 50 km (31 mi) east of Brno. It lies in the Litenčice Hills. The highest point is at 390 m (1,280 ft) above sea level. The stream Věžecký potok flows through the municipality.

== History ==
The first written mention of Zlobice is from 1078, when Prince Otto I of Olomouc donated the village to the newly established Hradisko Monastery in Olomouc. In 1573, the abbot Jan Poniatowski sold Zlobice to the Haugwitz family, who annexed it to their Chropyně estate. In 1615, the estate was bought by Cardinal Franz von Dietrichstein. From that time until the establishment of an independent municipality in 1848, the estate was a property of Olomouc bishopric.

== Demographics ==
Historical population

| Year | Pop. | ±% |
|---|---|---|
| 1869 | 648 | — |
| 1880 | 674 | +4.0% |
| 1890 | 727 | +7.9% |
| 1900 | 812 | +11.7% |
| 1910 | 856 | +5.4% |

| Year | Pop. | ±% |
|---|---|---|
| 1921 | 817 | −4.6% |
| 1930 | 857 | +4.9% |
| 1950 | 674 | −21.4% |
| 1961 | 716 | +6.2% |
| 1970 | 702 | −2.0% |

| Year | Pop. | ±% |
|---|---|---|
| 1980 | 678 | −3.4% |
| 1991 | 604 | −10.9% |
| 2001 | 587 | −2.8% |
| 2011 | 615 | +4.8% |
| 2021 | 596 | −3.1% |

Source: Censuses

== Transport ==
The D1 motorway from Brno to Ostrava runs north of Zlobice just beyond the municipal border.

== Sights ==
The main landmark of Zlobice is the Church of Saints Cyril and Methodius. It was built in 1897–1898.
