= Dolní Bojanovice =

- Municipality
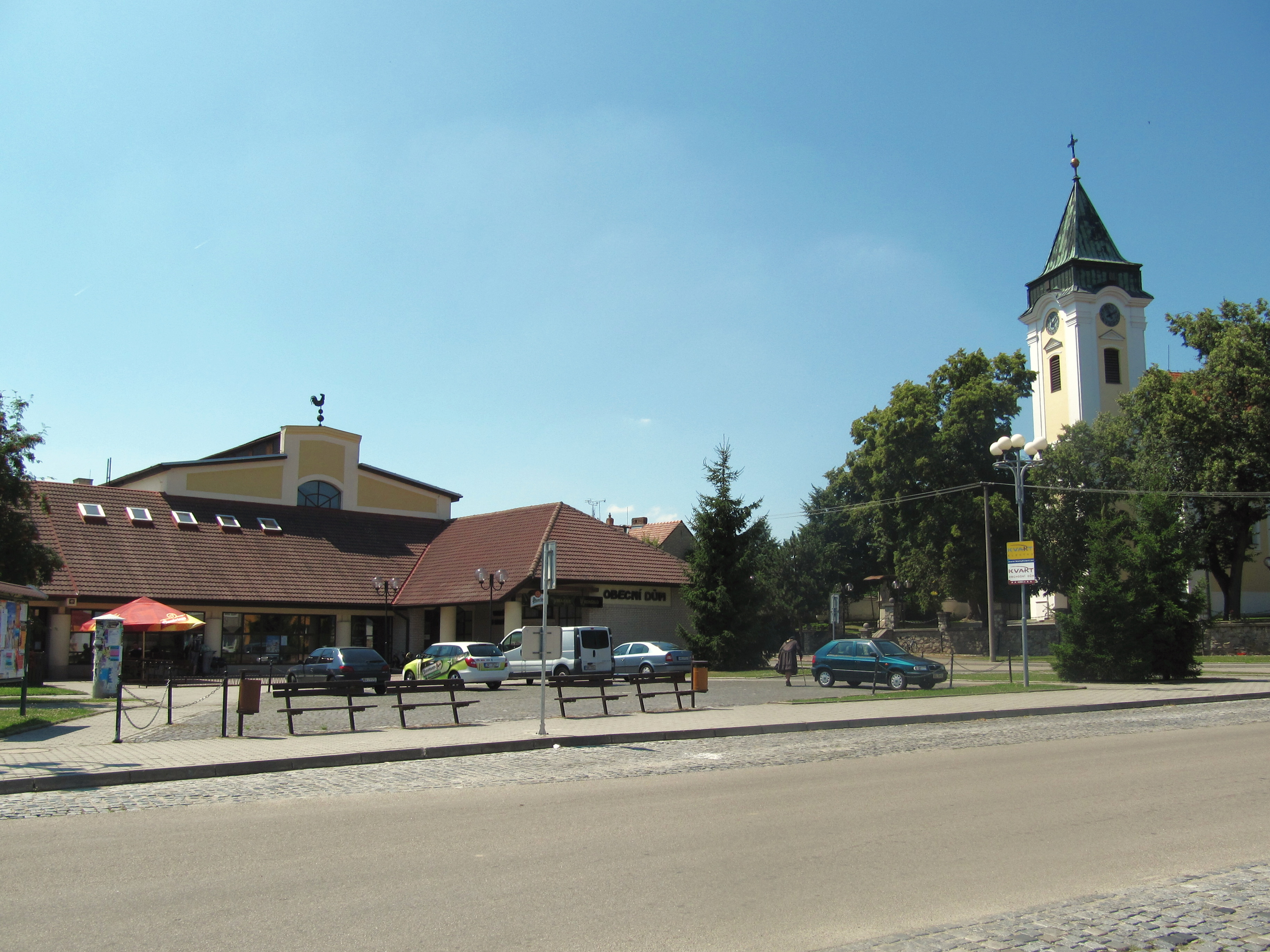
- Square with Church of Saint Wenceslaus

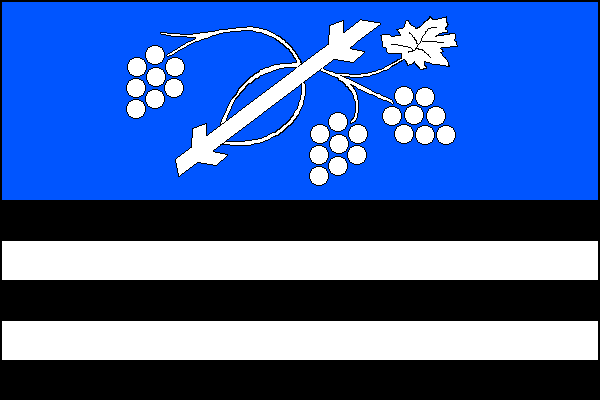
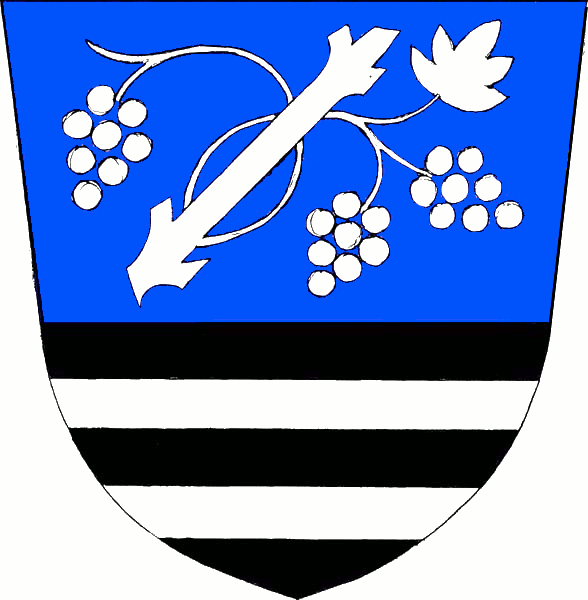
- Flag Coat of arms

- Location in the Czech Republic
- Coordinates: 48°51′31″N 17°1′43″E
- Country: Czech Republic
- Region: South Moravian
- District: Hodonín
- First mentioned: 1196

Area
  - Total: 19.91 km^{2} (7.69 sq mi)
- Elevation: 178 m (584 ft)

Population (2026-01-01)
  - Total: 3,050
  - Density: 153/km^{2} (397/sq mi)
- Time zone: UTC+1 (CET)
  - Summer (DST): UTC+2 (CEST)
- Postal code: 696 17
- Website: www.dolnibojanovice.cz

Dolní Bojanovice (Czech pronunciation: [ˈdolɲiː ˈbojanovɪtsɛ]; German: Unter Bojanowitz) is a municipality and village in Hodonín District in the South Moravian Region of the Czech Republic. It has about 3,100 inhabitants.

== Geography ==
Dolní Bojanovice is located about 6 kilometres (4 mi) west of Hodonín and 47 km (29 mi) southeast of Brno. It lies on the border between the Kyjov Hills and Lower Morava Valley. The highest point is at 278 m (912 ft) above sea level. The Prušánka Stream flows through the municipality.

== History ==
The first written mention of Dolní Bojanovice is from 1196. The most notable owners of the village were the Lords of Kunštát.

== Demographics ==
Historical population

Year	Pop.	±%
1869	1,615	—
1880	1,776	+10.0%
1890	1,895	+6.7%
1900	2,005	+5.8%
1910	2,242	+11.8%

Year	Pop.	±%
1921	2,278	+1.6%
1930	2,316	+1.7%
1950	2,363	+2.0%
1961	2,729	+15.5%
1970	2,764	+1.3%

Year	Pop.	±%
1980	2,794	+1.1%
1991	2,778	−0.6%
2001	2,881	+3.7%
2011	2,866	−0.5%
2021	2,897	+1.1%

Source: Censuses

== Economy ==
Dolní Bojanovice is known for viticulture and winemaking. The municipality lies in the Slovácká wine subregion.

== Transport ==
There are no railways or major roads passing through the municipality.

== Sights ==
The main landmark of Dolní Bojanovice is the Church of Saint Wenceslaus. It was built in the Baroque style in 1734.

== Notable people ==
- Petr Esterka (1935–2021), Czech-American bishop
