= Lev Skrbenský z Hříště =

His Eminence Lev Skrbenský z Hřiště
- Cardinal, Archbishop of Olomouc
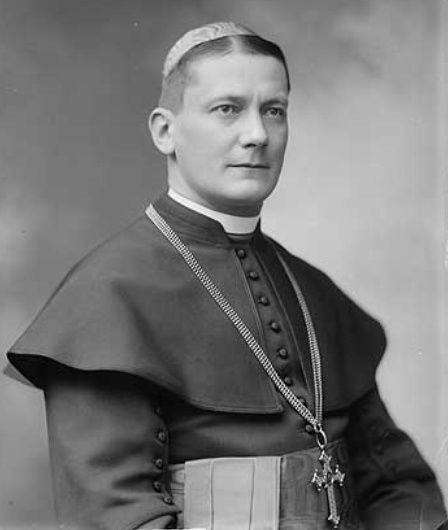
- Lev Skrbenský
- Church: Roman Catholic
- Archdiocese: Olomouc
- Installed: 1916
- Term ended: 6 July 1920
- Predecessor: Franziskus von Sales Bauer
- Successor: Antonín Cyril Stojan
- Other post: Cardinal-Priest of Santo Stefano al Monte Celio (1901–1938)
- Previous post: Cardinal Archbishop of Prague (1899–1916)

Orders
- Ordination: 7 July 1889
- Consecration: 6 January 1900
- Created cardinal: 15 April 1901 by Leo XIII
- Rank: Cardinal

Personal details
- Born: 12 June 1863 Hukovice, Moravia, Austrian Empire
- Died: 24 December 1938 (aged 75) Dlouhá Loučka, Czechoslovakia

Lev Skrbenský z Hříště (German: Leo Skrbenský von Hříště, also spelt Skrebensky; 12 June 1863 – 24 December 1938) was a Cardinal in the Catholic Church.

== Life ==
Lev Skrbenský z Hříště was born on 12 June 1863 in Hukovice, Moravia, Austrian Empire (now a part of Bartošovice, Czech Republic). Born into a wealthy family, he was educated at the seminary of Olomouc and during the 1880s worked on a doctorate in canon law at the Pontifical Gregorian University. During his stay in Rome he lived in the priest college Santa Maria dell'Anima and served there as a chaplain from 1890 to 1892, as did many other priests from Bohemia and Moravia. After being ordained in 1889, he went into the army of the Austrian Empire and spent the following decade serving as an army chaplain.

He left his military duties in 1899, and Emperor Franz Joseph I of Austria selected him as Archbishop of Prague. Two years later, he was made a cardinal on 15 April 1901, at the age of thirty-seven. (Note: Since then no man has been made a cardinal at such a young age. The youngest in the past hundred years have been: Manuel Gonçalves Cerejeira in 1929 at the age of 41 and Jusztinián György Serédi in 1927 at the age of 43.) He received the red hat on 9 June 1902. Later that year, Lev (together with other Bohemian and Moravian bishops) was addressed in pope Leo's encyclical Quae Ad Nos. He participated in the 1903 and 1914 conclaves, and in 1916 was transferred to the see of Olomouc, to which he was elected by its cathedral chapter at the request of the Habsburg government.

The new Czechoslovak government demanded that the majority of incumbent bishops be replaced and systematically implemented a persecutory anti-church policy. Due to this imposition, at least other six bishops, including Pavel Huyn, his successor as Archbishop of Prague, had been replaced or forced out to resign. After 1921 only two pre-war bishops were allowed to remain.

He resigned this see in 1920, after request of Nuncio Clemente Micara, officially due to poor health, and did not participate in the 1922 conclave. He remained the only cardinal in Czechoslovakia for another 15 years after his resignation, until the elevation of Archbishop of Prague Karel Kašpar to the cardinalate in 1935.

Although his health remained very poor, Skrbenský z Hříště lived until 1938 and was the last cardinal created by Pope Leo XIII to die, outliving Vincenzo Vannutelli by more than eight years.

== Notes ==
Catholic Church titles
Preceded by Franziskus von Paula Graf von Schönborn	Archbishop of Prague; 1899–1916	Succeeded by Pavel Huyn
Preceded by Franziskus von Sales Bauer	Archbishop of Olomouc; 1916–1920	Succeeded by Antonín Cyril Stojan
