= Cathedral of St. Peter and Paul, Brno =

Cathedral of St Peter and St Paul
- Katedrála svatého Petra a Pavla

- Location within Czech Republic
- 49°11′27.6″N 16°36′25.2″E
- Location: Brno
- Country: Czech Republic
- Denomination: Roman Catholic
- Website: Website of the cathedral

History
- Status: Active

Architecture
- Functional status: Cathedral and Parish church
- Architect(s): František Benedikt Klíčník, Mořic Grimm, August Kirstein, others
- Architectural type: Church
- Style: Baroque, Gothic Revival
- Groundbreaking: 11th century
- Completed: 1909

Administration
- Diocese: Brno

Clergy
- Bishop: Vojtěch Cikrle

The Cathedral of Saints Peter and Paul (Czech: Katedrála svatého Petra a Pavla) is a Roman Catholic cathedral located on the Petrov hill in the Brno-střed district of the city of Brno in the Czech Republic. It is commonly referred to locally as simply "Petrov". It is the seat of the Diocese of Brno and a national cultural monument that is one of the most important pieces of architecture in South Moravia. The interior is mostly Baroque in style, while the exterior shell is Gothic that dates mostly from the 14th century, and its impressive 84-metre-high towers were constructed to the Gothic Revival designs of the architect August Kirstein between 1901 and 1909. The original cathedral site dates to the 11th century.

== History ==
The site of the Cathedral of Saints Peter and Paul has housed a church since at least the 11th and 12th centuries; a Romanesque chapel was built there in about 1140, during the reign of Margrave Conrad II. It contained a crypt (which now lies under the paving of the entrance to the current the church) built probably for the burial of an important local dignitary or as a court chapel. A larger church, possibly a Romanesque basilica with embryonic Gothic forms, was constructed there around the 1230s and dedicated to St. Peter. It was damaged, however, in a large fire that swept through the city of Brno in 1306. A cemetery with the Chapel of the Holy Trinity (Kaple Nejsvětější Trojice) was constructed adjacent to the church in 1368. The first documentation of the patronage of both Saints Peter and Paul dates from 1378.

The church was reconstructed again in the second quarter of the 15th century in the aftermath of the Hussite Wars, when a presbytery and several smaller annexes were added to it, including the chapel of the Virgin Mary, and the church acquired an overall cross-shaped floor plan common to most Gothic churches. From 1296 it had served as the seat of the Royal Capital Chapter of St. Peter and Paul in Brno, a college of various monasteries. This church lasted only until 1643, when a large fire started by Swedish troops during the Thirty Years War burnt the entire set of buildings on Petrov hill, and the church underwent subsequent rebuilding and renovations, many of which were of the early Baroque style common at the time.

The eighteenth century saw further renovations to the church take place, and in 1775–1777 it became the seat of the new Diocese of Brno. Much of these renovations were carried out by the famous local builder František Benedikt Klíčník, while the interior received a Baroque-style treatment that remains mostly intact today, mostly from designs by the architect Mořic Grimm. Grimm's renovations primarily focused on the side altars, the main altar space, and the removal of most of the Gothic elements. In addition, several other auxiliary structures were built around the church in order to accommodate the administration of the diocese. More renovations took place about a century later, when between 1879 and 1891 a new Gothic-style presbytery, chapel of the Virgin Mary, and sacristy were constructed; at the same time, the current high altar, a Gothic work of Viennese furniture maker Josef Leimer depicting the Twelve Apostles and the crucifixion of Christ, was installed. These were carried out under the direction of architects August Prokop and K. Woresch.

The last major additions to the structure took place between 1901 and 1909, when the Viennese architect August Kirstein was brought in to design the twin Gothic towers that give the church its present monumental character. At the same time, the exterior saw the addition of the tombstones of the Brno bishops Václav Urban Stuffler and Vincent Josef Schrattenbach, as well as of several patrician families. Also added at the beginning of the century was the outer pulpit, the so-called "Kapistránka" to the left of the main entrance, named after the Franciscan Saint John of Capistrano, who preached in Brno at the second half of 1451.

== Interior furnishings ==
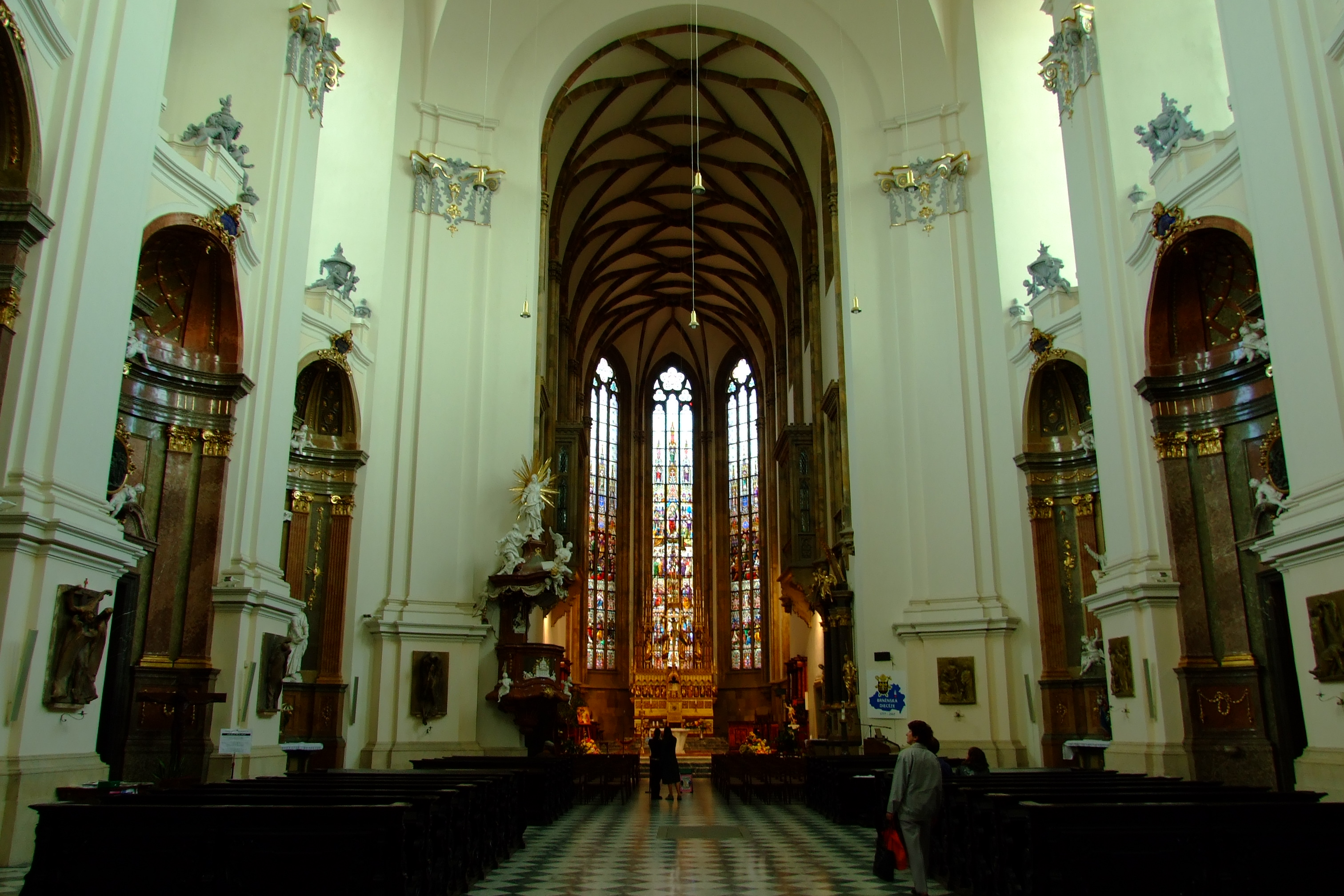
Interior of the cathedral

The oldest elements of the interior equipment include a boxed tabernacle in the Marian Chapel dating from 1652, later altered in 1783 by the sculptor Ondřej Schweigl, and the marble body of the baptistery from 1656 by Simon Brandt. The church pews were created in 1738 by the carpenter Ondřej Romer, and confessionals dating from the 1840s were moved here from the Jesuit church in the late 1970s. Some think the previous benches were made in 1654 by Petr Tobiáš Pacher. There are two types of cabinets in the sacristy: some contain inlay work, probably by Jan Pelikán from 1717; the others are stylistically older and decorated with black profiled moldings. The main altar is the work of August Prokop and Karl Woresch (1891). The side altars, the pulpit, the original main altar and other stucco decorations were created in the late Baroque style in the 1770s or 1780s in Schweigl's workshop. In 1909, the church was furnished with a new organ made by the Bratři Paštikové company from Žižkov. The sculptor Jiří Marek created modern Stations of the Cross.

== The "midday" chimes ==
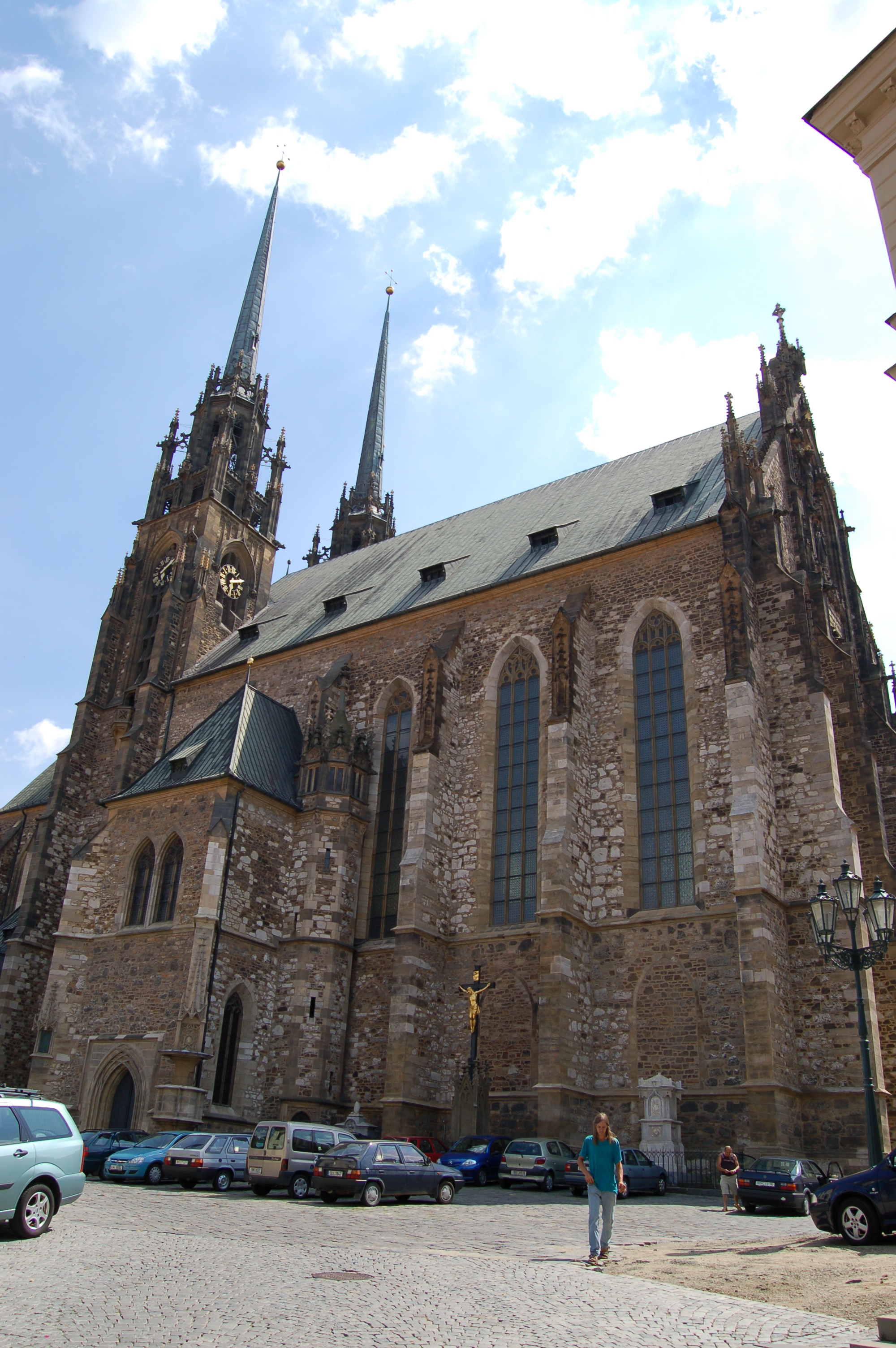
Exterior of the cathedral

Traditionally, the bells of the cathedral are rung at 11 o'clock in the morning instead of 12 noon. The reason for this, according to legend, is that during the Thirty Years' War the invading Swedes had promised, when laying siege to Brno, that they would call off their attack if they had not succeeded in taking the city by midday on the 15th of August. The battle underway, some shrewd citizens decided to ring the bells an hour early on this date, fooling the Swedes into breaking off the siege and leaving empty-handed.

== Religious services ==
- Sunday: 7.30 a.m., 9.00 a.m. & 10.30 a.m.
- Monday: 7.30 a.m.
- Tuesday: 7.30 a.m. & 19.00
- Wednesday: 7.30 a.m. & 17.30
- Thursday: 7.30 a.m. & 17.30
- Friday: 7.30 a.m. & 17.30
- Saturday: 7.30 a.m.
