= Diocese of Brno =

Roman Catholic diocese in Czechia

Coordinates: 49.2000°N 16.6000°E

Diocese of Brno Dioecesis Brunensis Diecéze Brněnská

Catholic

Location
- Country: Czech Republic
- Metropolitan: Archdiocese of Olomouc
- Headquarters: Brno, South Moravian Region, Czechia

Statistics
- Area: 10,668 km^{2} (4,119 sq mi)
- Population: Total; Catholics: (as of 2023); 1,407,000; 554,640 (39.4%)
- Parishes: 451

Information
- Denomination: Catholic Church
- Sui iuris church: Latin Church
- Rite: Roman Rite
- Established: 5 December 1777; 248 years ago
- Cathedral: Cathedral of St Peter and St Paul (Katedrála sv. Petra a Pavla)
- Patron saint: Saint Peter and Saint Paul

Current leadership
- Pope: Leo XIV
- Bishop: Pavel Konzbul
- Metropolitan Archbishop: Josef Nuzík
- Bishops emeritus: Vojtěch Cikrle

Map
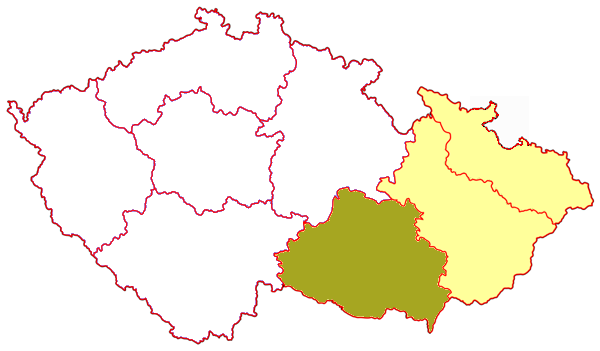

Website
- Website of the Diocese

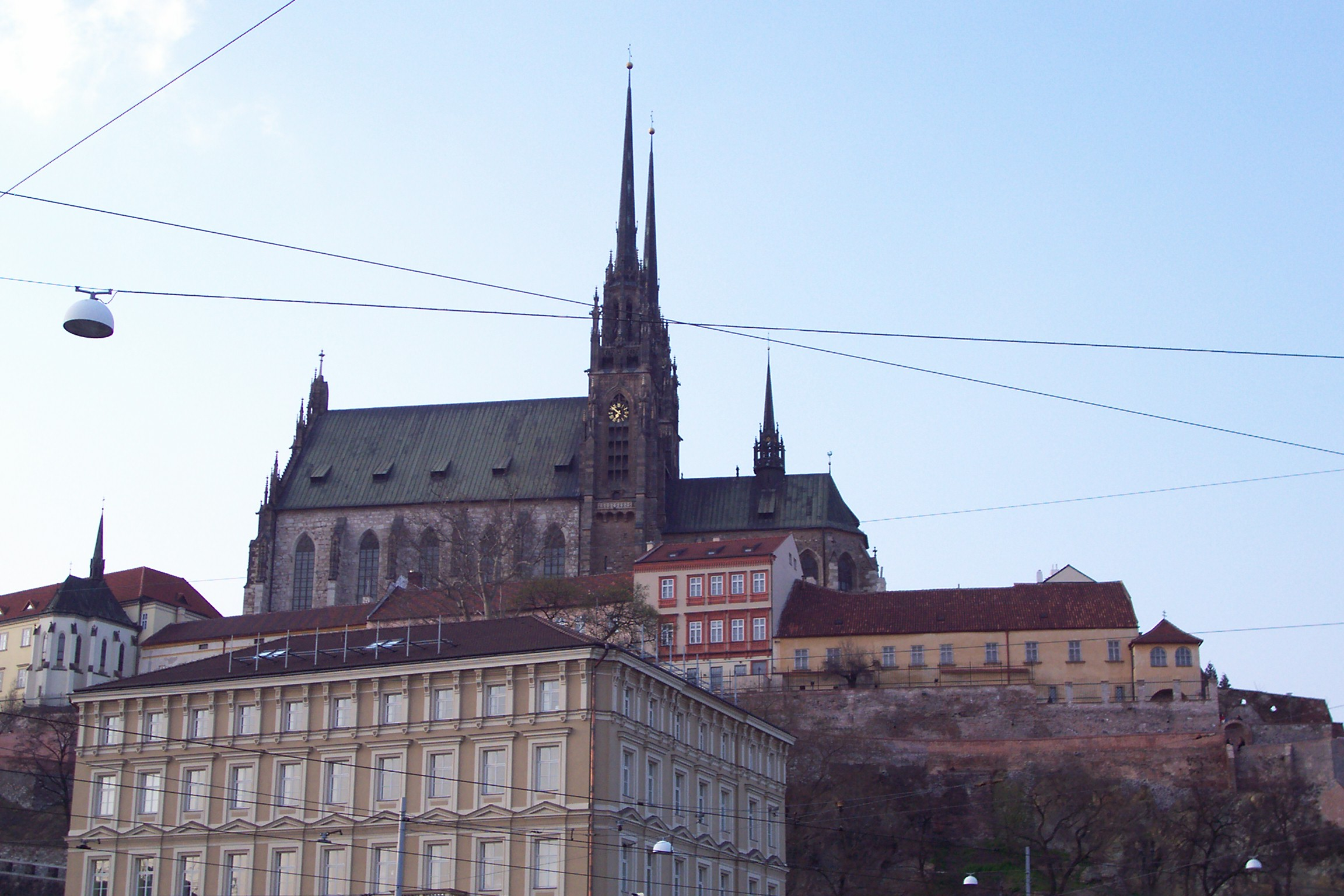
St. Peter and Paul Cathedral

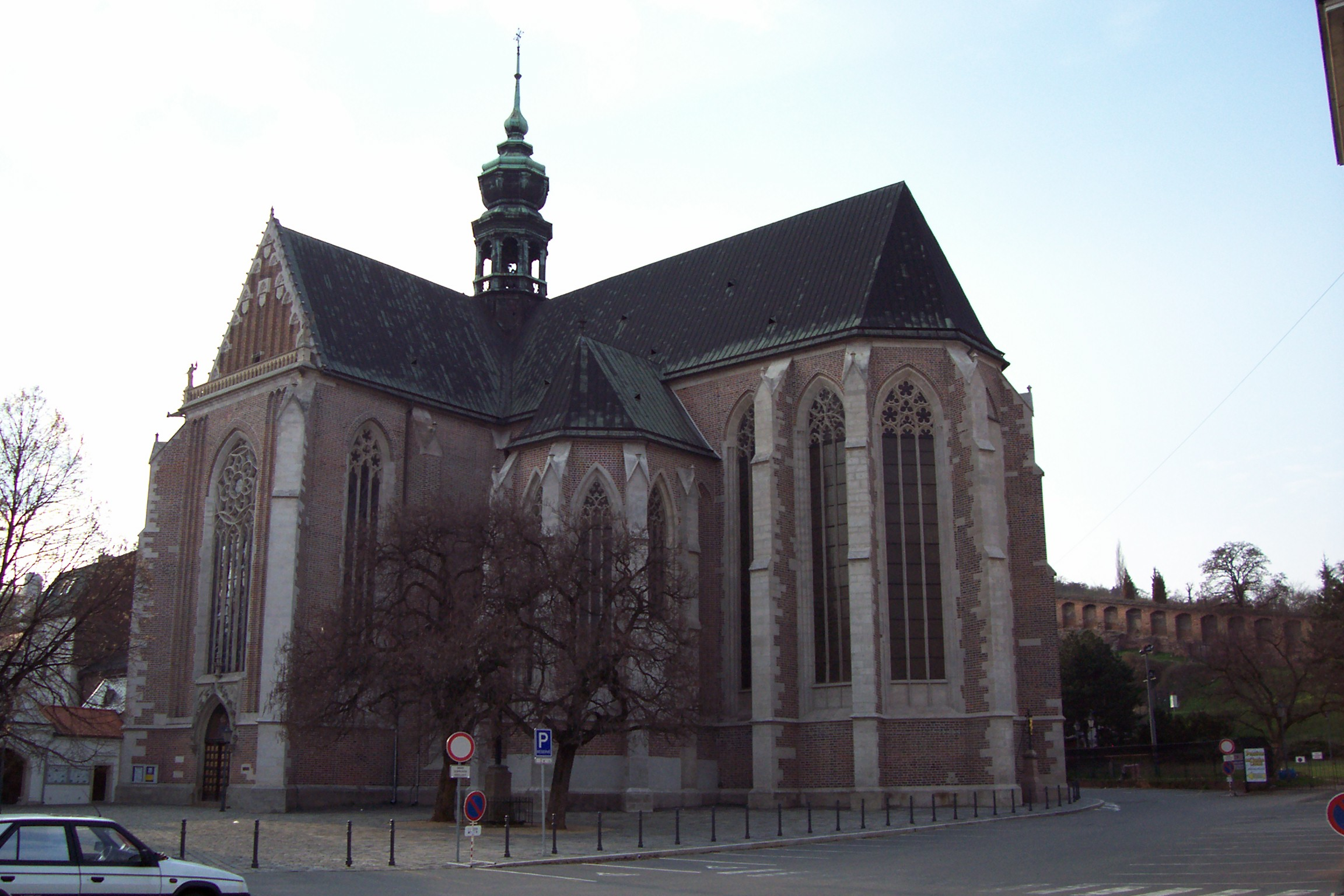
Staré Brno Basilica (part of the St. Thomas Abbey)

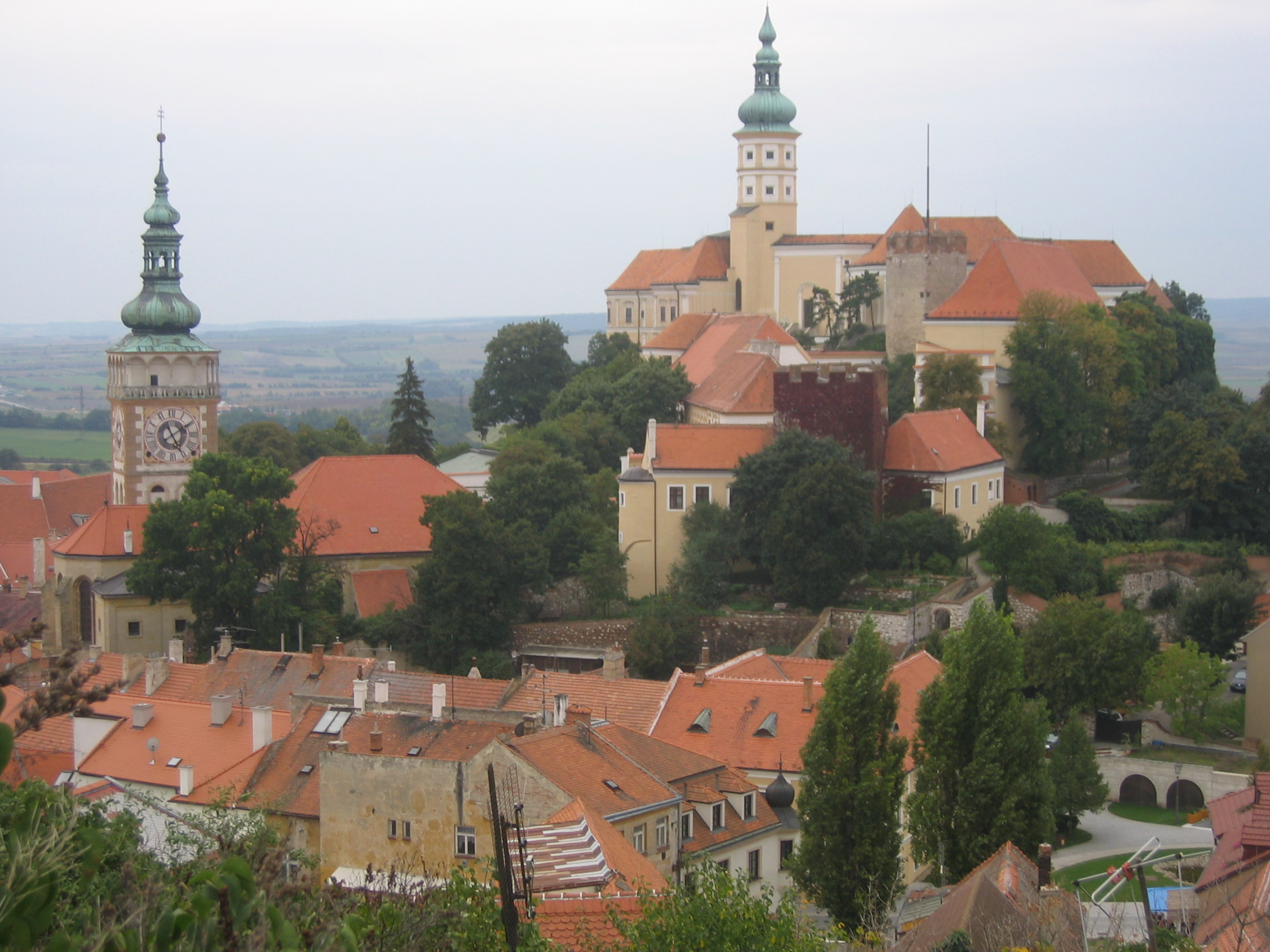
Mikulov – seat of the collegiate chapter since the 17th century

The Diocese of Brno (Latin: Dioecesis Brunensis) is a Latin diocese located in the city of Brno in the ecclesiastical province of Olomouc in the Czech Republic.

== History ==
- 1296: A collegiate (latter the cathedral) chapter established in Brno
- 1625: A collegiate chapter established in Mikulov
- 5 December 1777: The Diocese of Brno is established from a part of the Diocese of Olomouc
- 1780s: As a consequence of the Edict on Idle Institutions (by Joseph II) some ancient monasteries and convents abolished
- 1783: Territory (substantially) extended
- 1807: A seminary established
- 1909: The first diocesan synod was held
- 1926: Bishop Norbert Klein is forced to resign in the wake of the government's policies towards the Church. Due to the difficult relations between the Vatican and Czechoslovakia, the see remained vacant for more than five years
- 1934: The second diocesan synod was held
- 1938-1945: Substantial southern part of the diocese (under the rule of Nazi Germany) administered separately by vicar general in Mikulov
- 1945-1946: German population expelled from the diocese
- 1950: The seminary abolished due to the Communist rule
- 1950-1968: Communists prevented Bishop Karel Skoupý from tenure of office
- 1972-1990: Sede vacante due to the Communist rule
- 1999: Administrative reorganisation: number of deaneries reduced from 37 to 20

== Special churches ==
- Basilica of the Assumption in Staré Brno
- Basilica of Our Lady of the Assumption and St. Nicholas in Žďár nad Sázavou
- St. Wenceslaus Collegiate Church in Mikulov

== Bishops of Brno ==
- Mathias Franz Graf von Chorinsky Freiherr von Ledske (15 December 1777 – 30 October 1786)
- Johann Baptist Lachenbauer, O.Cr. (29 January 1787 – 22 February 1799)
- Vinzenz Joseph von Schrattenbach (11 August 1800 – 25 May 1816)
- Wenzel Urban von Stuffler (28 July 1817 – 24 May 1831)
- Franz Anton Gindl (2 July 1832 – 15 August 1841), confirmed Bishop of Gurk
- Anton Ernst von Schaffgotsch (27 January 1842 – 31 March 1870)
- Karl Nöttig (29 November 1870 – 14 January 1882)
- Franziskus von Sales Bauer (3 July 1882 – 10 May 1904), appointed Archbishop of Olomouc
- Pavel Huyn (14 May 1904 – 4 October 1916), appointed Archbishop of Prague
- Norbert Klein, OT (7 December 1916 – 4 January 1926), resigned
- Josef Kupka (22 October 1931 – 10 June 1941)
- Karel Skoupý (3 April 1946 – 22 February 1972)
- Vojtěch Cikrle (14 February 1990 – 26 May 2022), retired
- Pavel Konzbul (26 May 2022 – Present)

=== Other priests of this diocese who became bishop ===
- Josef Hinterhölzl (1939), appointed Bishop clandestinely in 1984
- Felix Maria Davídek (1945), appointed Bishop clandestinely in 1967
- Václav Razik (1945), appointed Bishop clandestinely in 1978
- Stanislav Krátký (1946), appointed Bishop clandestinely in 1968
- Pavel Posád (1977-2003), appointed Bishop of Litoměřice in 2003

== Saints connected with the diocese ==
- St. Peter and Paul, patron saints of the diocese
- St. Zdislava, born 1220s in Křižanov
- St. Clement Hofbauer, born 1751 in Tasovice
- Blessed Maria Restituta, born 1894 in Husovice (now part of Brno)
- Jan Bula, a Catholic priest executed by the Communist regime in 1952. The Diocese has been processing his beatification since 2004.

== See also ==
- Roman Catholicism in the Czech Republic
