= Antonín Cyril Stojan =

Czech Roman Catholic prelate

Venerable Archbishop Antonín Cyril Stojan
- Archbishop of Olomouc
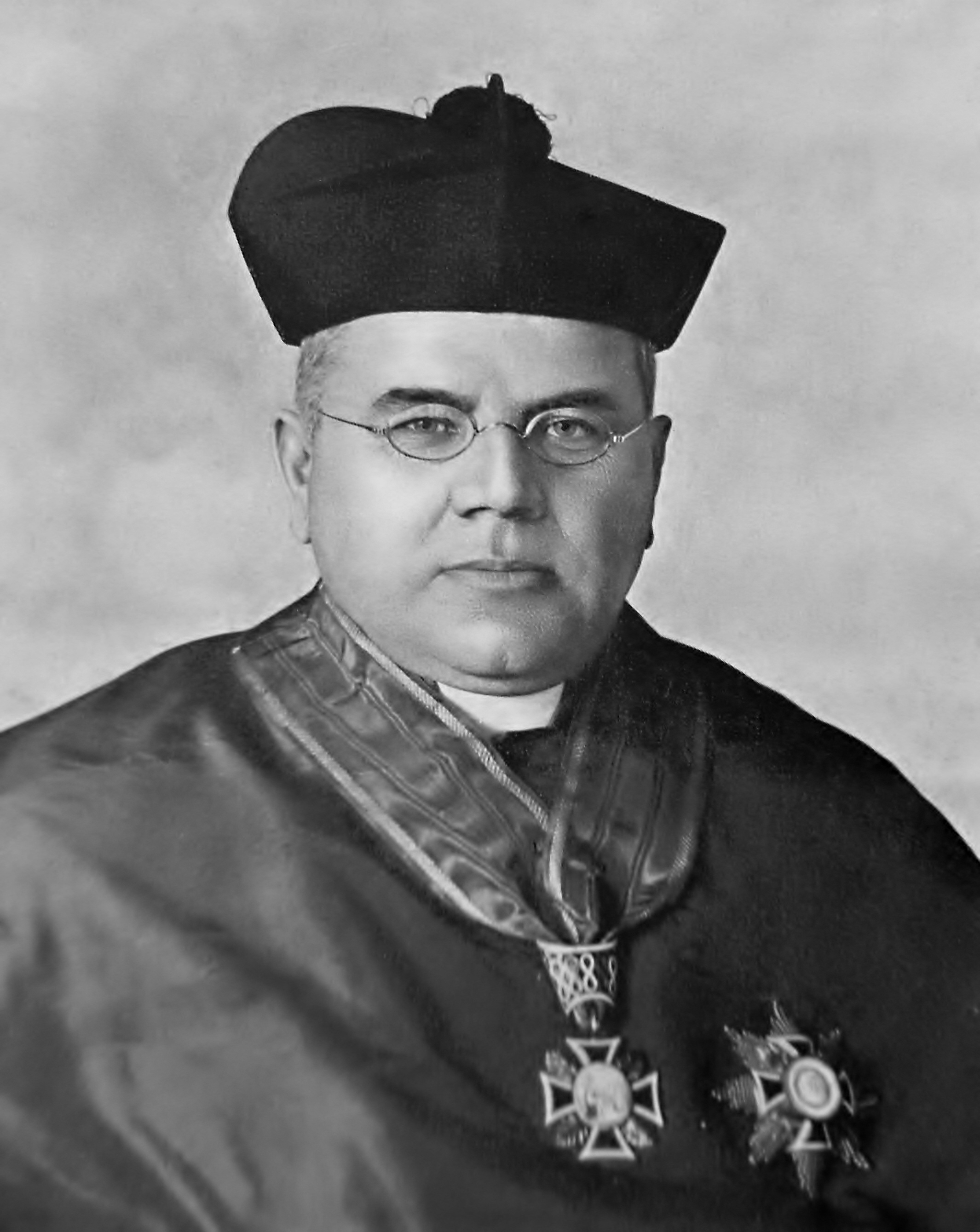
- Photograph.
- Church: Roman Catholic Church
- Archdiocese: Olomouc
- See: Olomouc
- Appointed: 10 March 1921
- Installed: 1921
- Term ended: 29 September 1923
- Predecessor: Lev Skrbenský z Hříště
- Successor: Leopold Precan

Orders
- Ordination: 5 July 1876 by Friedrich Egon von Fürstenberg
- Consecration: 3 April 1921 by Clemente Micara
- Rank: Archbishop

Personal details
- Born: Antonín Cyril Stojan; 22 May 1851 Beňov, Převov, Austrian Empire
- Died: 29 September 1923 (aged 72) Olomouc, Czechoslovakia
- Motto: "Let my life be a praise of God"
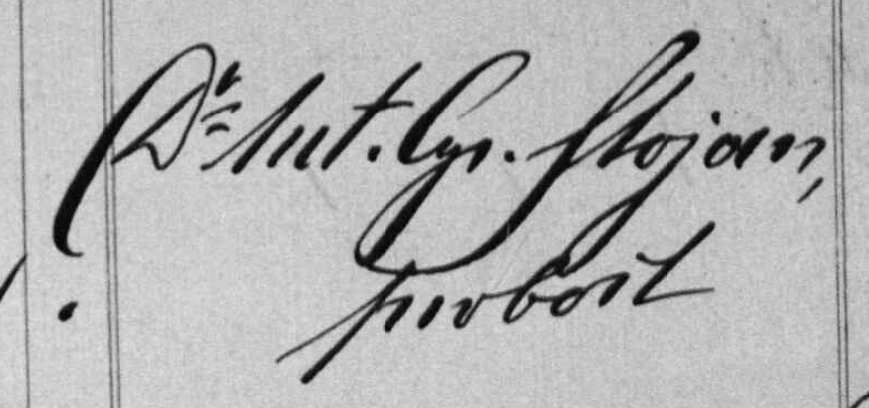
- Signature

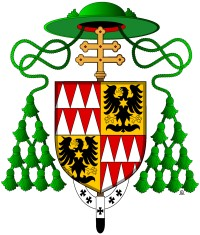
- Coat of arms

Sainthood
- Venerated in: Roman Catholic Church
- Title as Saint: Venerable
- Attributes: Episcopal attire

Antonín Cyril Stojan (22 May 1851 – 29 September 1923) was a Czech Roman Catholic prelate who served as the Archbishop of Olomouc from 1921 until his death. He was a politician prior to this and served in several political capacities while also serving as a pastor in several parishes where he strengthened social and charitable activities.

He was titled as Venerable on 14 June 2016 after Pope Francis confirmed his heroic virtue on the path to sainthood.

== Life ==
Antonín Stojan was born in 1851 in Beňov as the fifth of eight children to parents František and Josefa.

Stojan studied in both Kroměříž and Olomouc in preparation for the priesthood and received his ordination in 1876 from Cardinal Friedrich Egon von Fürstenberg; he served as a chaplain after his ordination in Příbor and was there for about a decade. From 1888 to 1909 he served as a pastor at Dražovice. Stojan founded an apostolate to work for the unification of the Slavic people and served as a member of the Austrian Parliament (or Imperial Council) from 1897 until he served as a senator for Czechoslovakia from 1920 until his death, being succeeded by Bohuslav Koukal. He also served as the canon of the Olomouc Cathedral from 1917 and the provost of the Saint Maurice Kromeriz institute for seminarians.

On 10 March 1921 he received an appointment from Pope Benedict XV as the newest Archbishop of Olomouc, succeeding Lev Skrbenský z Hříště, and he received his episcopal consecration on the next 3 April from the then-Archbishop (future cardinal) Clemente Micara. He was installed in his new episcopal see and set to work organizing a range of charitable and social associations for the archdiocese while forming a charitable archdiocesan initiative in 1922. He also oversaw the restoration and the enhancement of places of pilgrimage such as the Velehrad Jesuit church. Stojan ordained as a priest the future Cardinal František Tomášek in 1922 and conferred episcopal consecration upon Bishop Josef Schinzel in 1923.

Stojan died in Olomouc on 29 September 1923 after he suffered from a brain aneurism on 11 May 1923.

== Beatification process ==
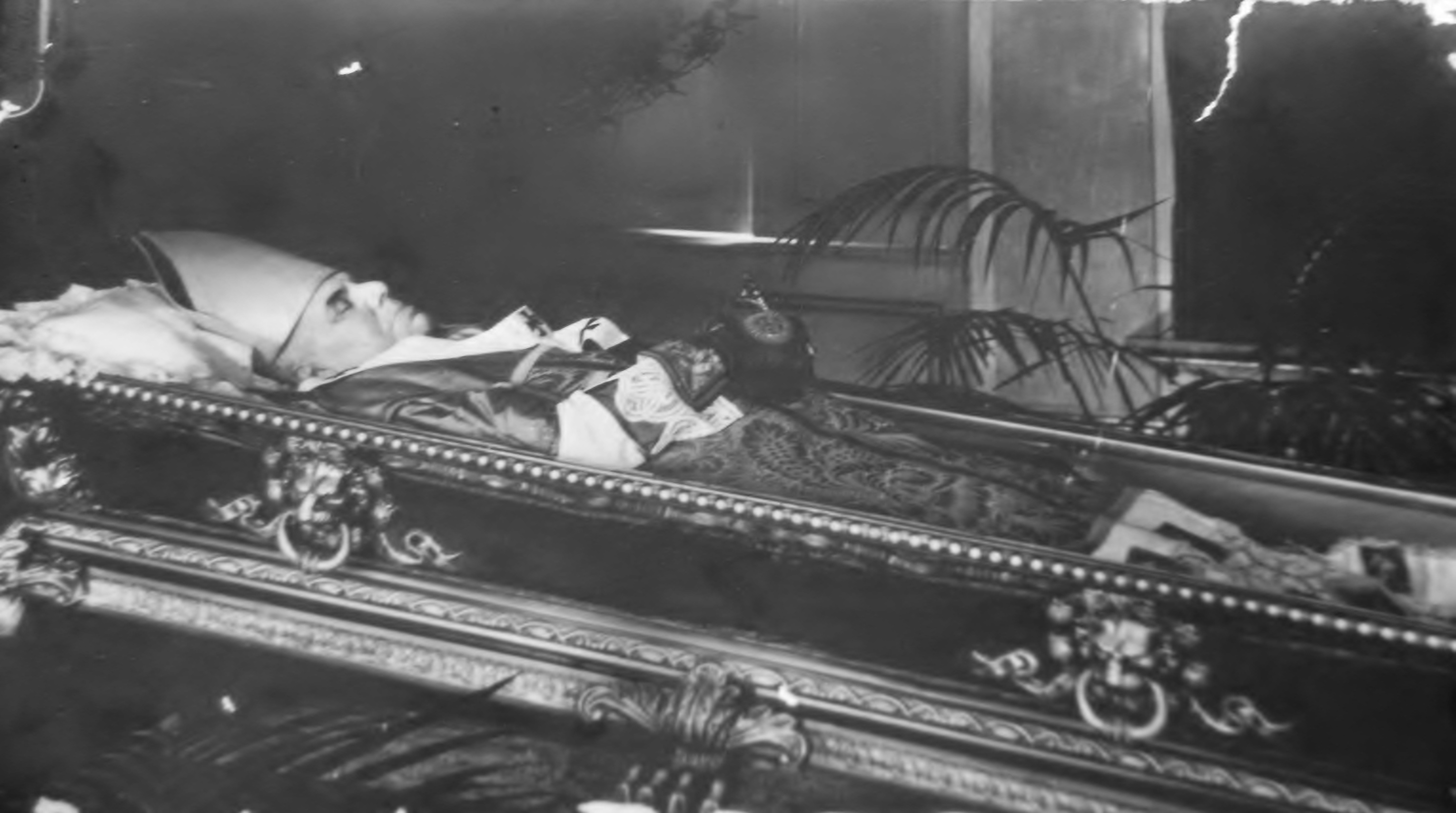
Stojan lying in state

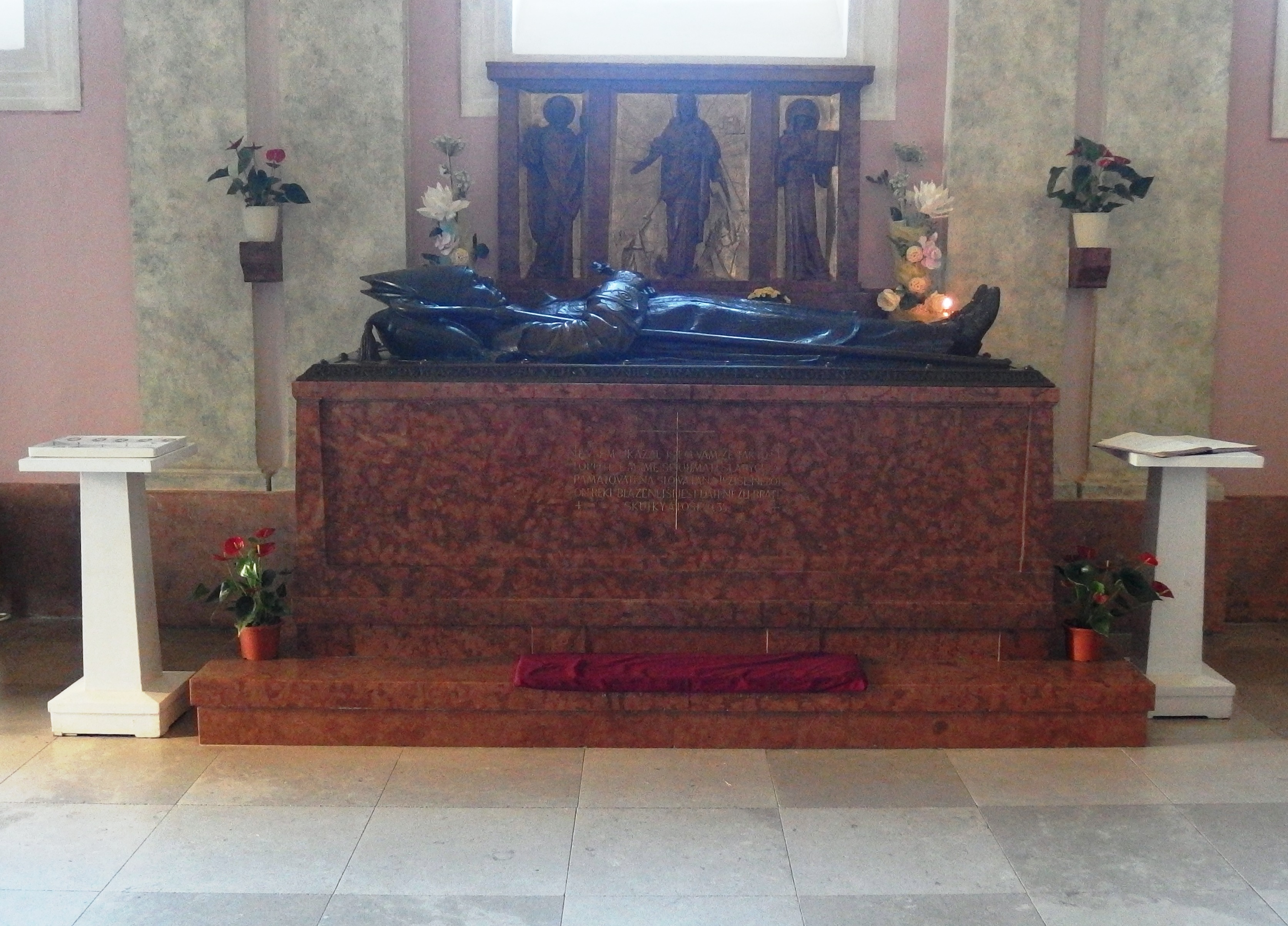
Tomb

The beatification cause opened with an informative process in Olomouc on 14 July 1965, and he became titled as a Servant of God while the process ended sometime later prior to the Congregation for the Causes of Saints validating the process in Rome in February 1996. However the official start to the cause came under Pope John Paul II later that month with the formal declaration of the "nihil obstat". The confirmation that Stojan led a life of heroic virtue allowed for Pope Francis to title him as Venerable on 14 June 2016.

== See also ==
- Roman Catholic Archdiocese of Olomouc
