= Josef Nuzík =

Roman Catholic Prelate in the Czech Republic

His Excellency, The Most Reverend, Monsignor. Josef Nuzík
- Metropolitan Archbishop of Olomouc
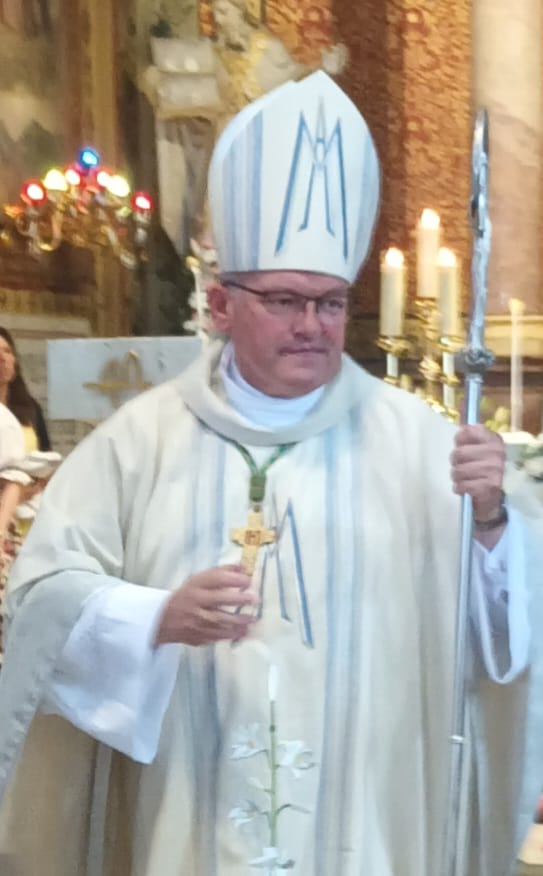
- Church: Roman Catholic Church
- Archdiocese: Olomouc
- Province: Olomouc
- Metropolis: Olomouc
- Appointed: 9 February 2024
- Predecessor: Jan Graubner
- Previous post: Auxiliary Bishop of Olomouc (2017–2024)

Orders
- Ordination: 17 June 1995
- Consecration: 14 October 2017 by Jan Graubner
- Rank: Metropolitan Archbishop

Personal details
- Born: 25 July 1966 (age 60) Strání, Czechoslovakia
- Denomination: Catholic Church
- Occupation: Archbishop, Prelate
- Education: Charles University; Palacký University Olomouc
- Coat of arms

His Excellency. The Most Reverend. Monsignor. Josef Nuzík (born 25 July 1966) is a Czech prelate of the Catholic Church. He was appointed the Metropolitan Archbishop of Olomouc by Pope Francis on 9 February 2024.

== Biography ==
Josef Nuzík was born on 25 July 1966, in Strání, Czechoslovakia and raised in a family of 11 children. After finishing vocational school in 1984, he worked at an engineering company and went through compulsory military service. In 1989 he started his preparation for the priesthood at a theological faculty in Litoměřice and later in Olomouc, where he was awarded a master's degree. He was ordained a deacon in 1994, served in Nový Jičín, and stayed in this parish also after the priestly ordination by Archbishop Jan Graubner in June 1995. Since 1996, he served as a parish vicar in Luhačovice; a year later, he was appointed an administrator of Nivnice and stayed here until 2003, when he was assigned to the pilgrimage site Štípa and, at the same time, appointed a dean of the Vizovice deanery. In 2005 he was called to serve as a vice-rector of the Archbishop's Priestly Seminary in Olomouc and worked here for 4 years. Archbishop Graubner appointed him his vicar general in 2009, he is also a canon of the Metropolitan Chapter of St. Wenceslaus in Olomouc. On 5 July 2017, he was appointed titular bishop of Castra Galbae and auxiliary bishop of Olomouc, receiving episcopal consecration the following 14 October. On 4 July 2022, he was elected diocesan administrator of the archdiocese of Olomouc. His installation as the archbishop was on 14 April 2024.
