= Karel Otáhal =

Czech sculptor

- Born: 19 January 1901; Kostelec na Hané, Austria-Hungary
- Died: 23 August 1972 (aged 71); Velké Opatovice, Czechoslovakia
- Occupation: Sculptor

Karel Otáhal (19 January 1901 – 23 August 1972) was a Czech sculptor. His work was part of the sculpture event in the art competition at the 1948 Summer Olympics.
