= Josef Hrdlička =

Czech Roman Catholic bishop (born 1942)

His Excellency, The Most Reverend Josef Hrdlička
- Auxiliary Bishop Emeritus of Olomouc
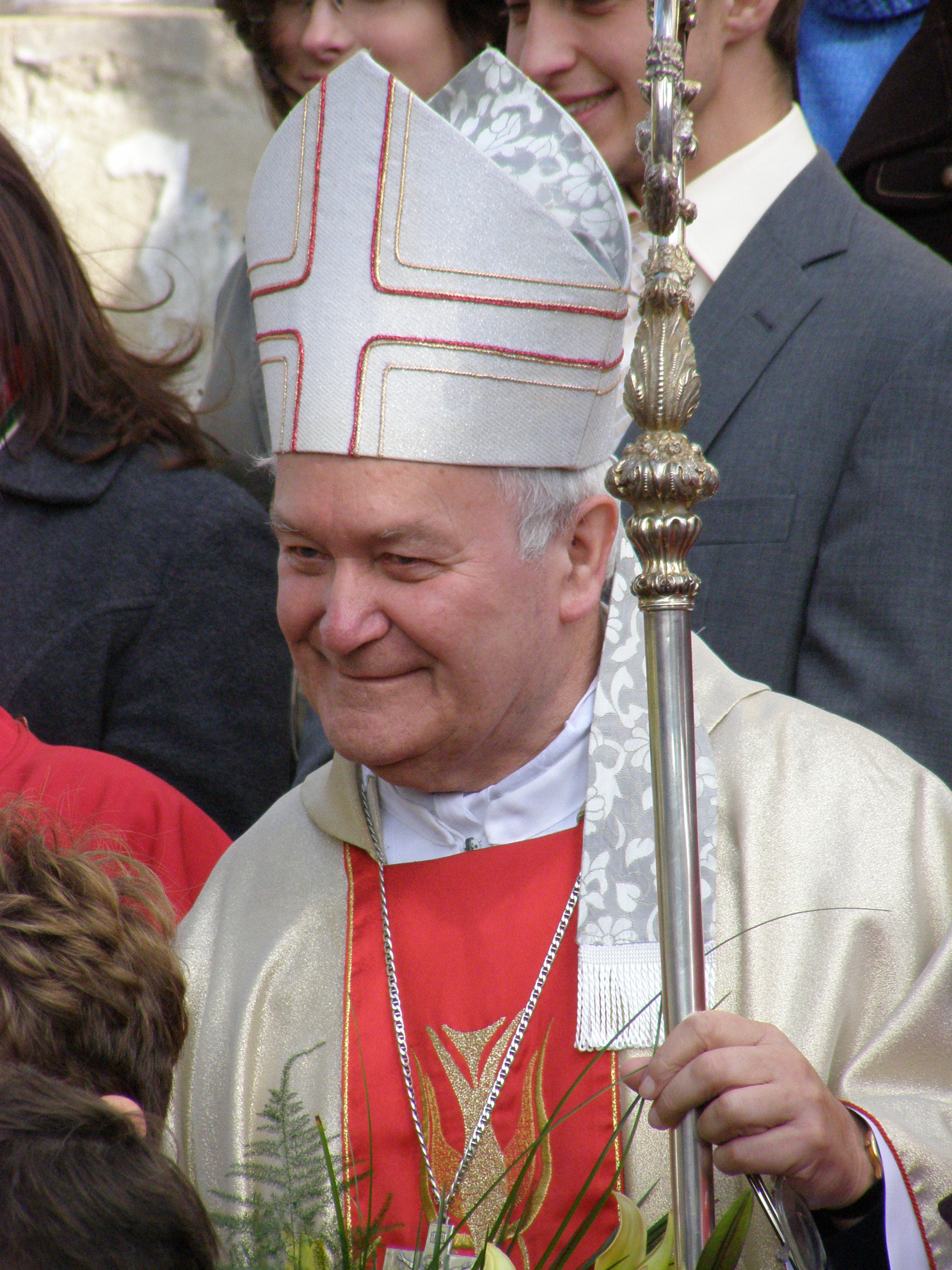
- Church: Roman Catholic Church
- Archdiocese: Olomouc
- Appointed: 17 March 1990
- Term ended: 1 February 2017
- Other post: Titular Bishop of Thunudruma (1990–present)

Orders
- Ordination: 1 July 1972 by Štěpán Trochta
- Consecration: 7 April 1990 by František Vaňák, Vojtěch Cikrle and Karel Otčenášek

Personal details
- Born: Josef Hrdlička; 19 January 1942 (age 84) Velké Opatovice, Protectorate of Bohemia and Moravia
- Motto: Vos dixi amicos ("I have called you friends")
- Coat of arms

Josef Hrdlička (born 19 January 1942) is a Czech Roman Catholic prelate who served as an auxiliary bishop of the Archdiocese of Olomouc from 1990 until his retirement in 2017. Since 1990 he has also held the titular see of Thunudruma.

== Early life and education ==
Hrdlička was born on 19 January 1942 in Velké Opatovice. After graduating from the grammar school in Jevíčko in 1959, he was unable to attend university because of religious discrimination under the Communist regime and worked as a labourer for eight years. In 1967 he entered the Saints Cyril and Methodius Faculty of Theology in Litoměřice. He completed his theological studies after the faculty returned to Olomouc and was ordained a priest on 1 July 1972 by Bishop Štěpán Trochta.

== Priestly ministry ==
Following his ordination, Hrdlička served in several parishes in northern Moravia, including Ostrava, Hoštejn, Hynčina, Maletín and Mírov. From 1986 he was parish priest in Liptaň, Pitárná, Třemešná and Vysoká in the Bruntál District.

== Episcopal ministry ==
On 17 March 1990, Pope John Paul II appointed Hrdlička titular bishop of Thunudruma and auxiliary bishop of Olomouc. He received episcopal consecration on 7 April 1990 from Archbishop František Vaňák, with Bishops Vojtěch Cikrle and Karel Otčenášek serving as co-consecrators. His episcopal motto is Vos dixi amicos ("I have called you friends").

Within the Czech Bishops' Conference he chaired the Commission for Divine Worship and the Council for Culture and Historical Monuments.

Pope Francis accepted Hrdlička's resignation as auxiliary bishop of Olomouc on 1 February 2017, after he had reached the canonical retirement age.

In 2023, the Czech Bishops' Conference requested prayers after Hrdlička was hospitalized in serious condition following a stroke.

== Other activities ==
Hrdlička is the author of numerous works of spiritual literature and has translated English Christian poetry into Czech, including works by Gerard Manley Hopkins and G. K. Chesterton. Between 2003 and 2005 he prepared the radio series Dialog víry a hudby ("Dialogue of Faith and Music") for Radio Proglas.
