= Beňov =

- Municipality
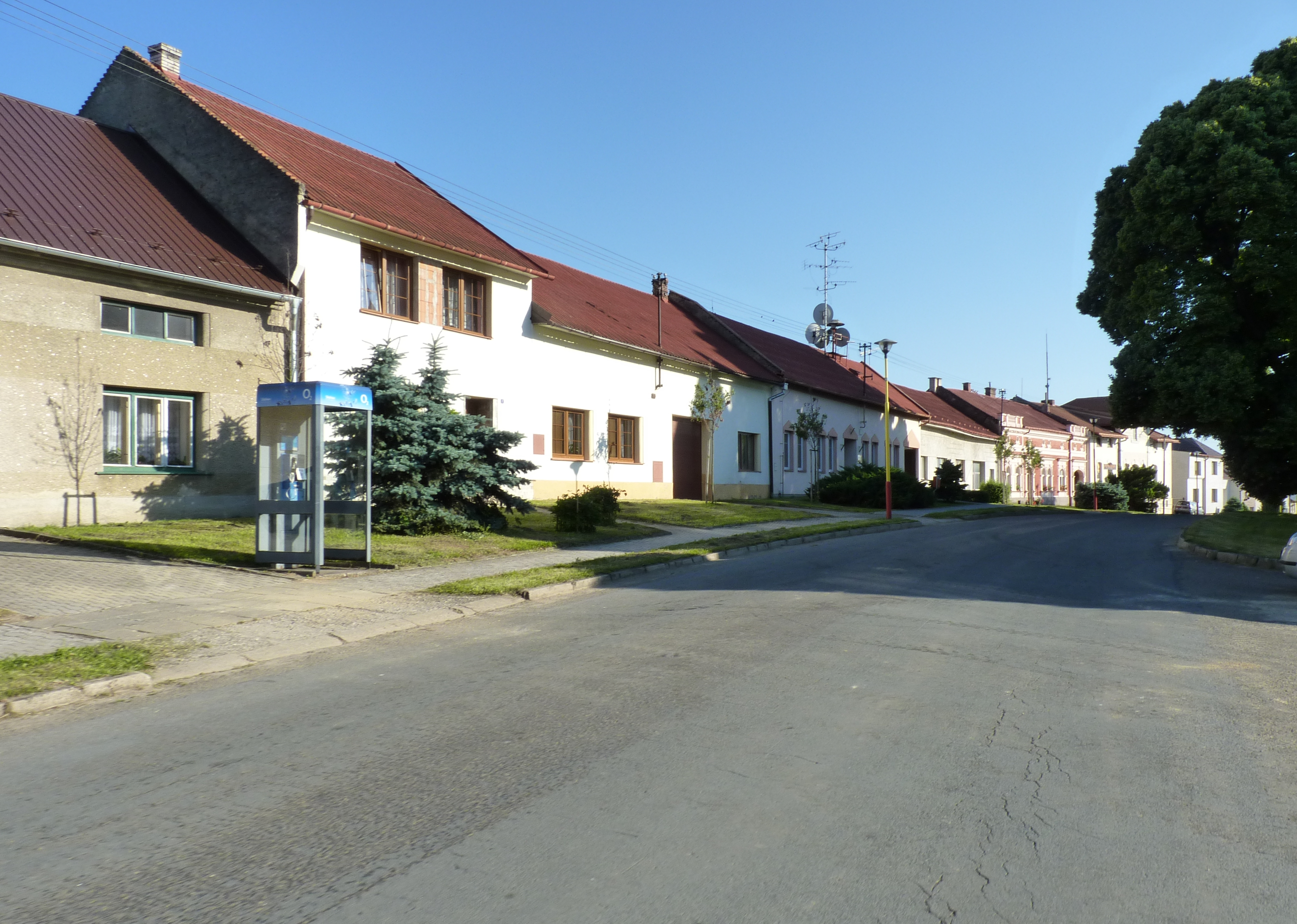
- Main street

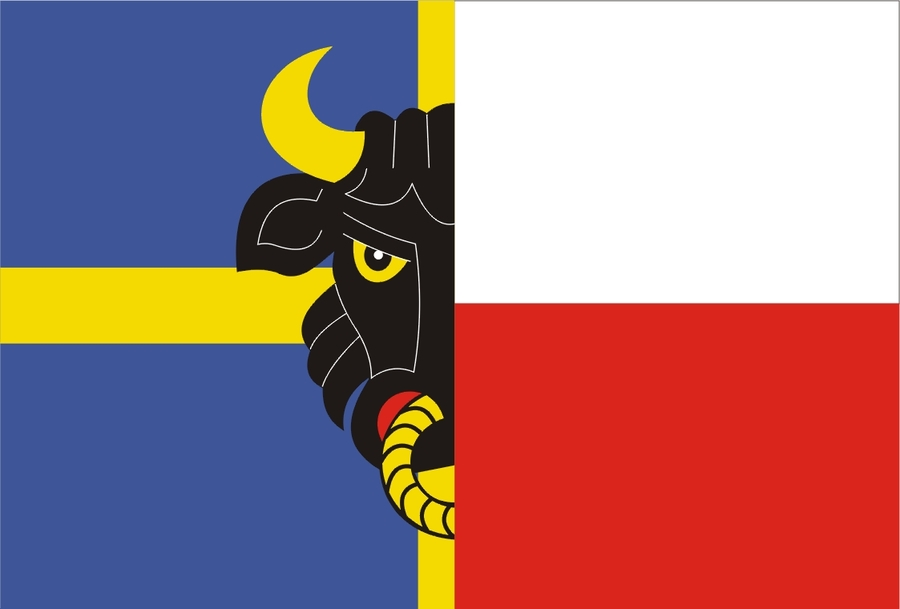
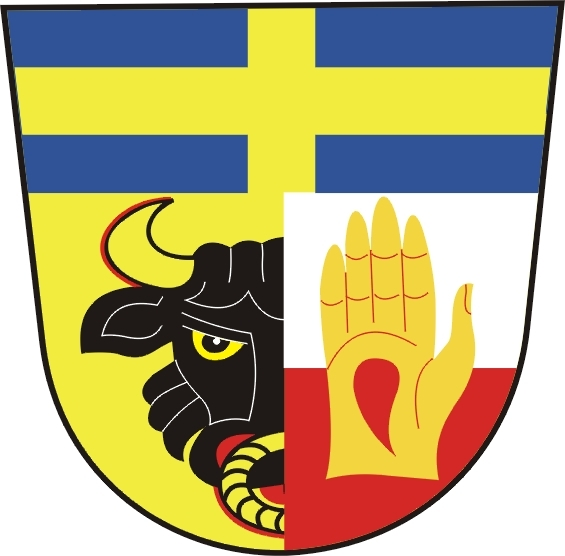
- Flag Coat of arms

- Location in the Czech Republic
- Coordinates: 49°25′3″N 17°30′5″E
- Country: Czech Republic
- Region: Olomouc
- District: Přerov
- First mentioned: 1365

Area
  - Total: 8.65 km^{2} (3.34 sq mi)
- Elevation: 240 m (790 ft)

Population (2026-01-01)
  - Total: 662
  - Density: 76.5/km^{2} (198/sq mi)
- Time zone: UTC+1 (CET)
  - Summer (DST): UTC+2 (CEST)
- Postal code: 750 02
- Website: www.benov.cz

Beňov is a municipality and village in Přerov District in the Olomouc Region of the Czech Republic. It has about 700 inhabitants.

Beňov lies approximately 6 kilometres (4 mi) south-east of Přerov, 27 km (17 mi) south-east of Olomouc, and 234 km (145 mi) east of Prague.

== Administrative division ==
Beňov consists of two municipal parts (in brackets population according to the 2021 census):

- Beňov (548)
- Prusy (81)

== Demographics ==
Historical population
Year	Pop.	±%
1869	725	—
1880	776	+7.0%
1890	784	+1.0%
1900	875	+11.6%
1910	938	+7.2%
1921	940	+0.2%
1930	943	+0.3%
1950	730	−22.6%
1961	827	+13.3%
1970	795	−3.9%
1980	767	−3.5%
1991	656	−14.5%
2001	682	+4.0%
2011	675	−1.0%
2021	629	−6.8%
Source: Censuses

== Notable people ==
- Antonín Cyril Stojan (1851–1923), Archbishop of Olomouc
