= Friedrich Egon von Fürstenberg =

His Eminence Friedrich Egon von Fürstenberg
- Archbishop of Olomouc
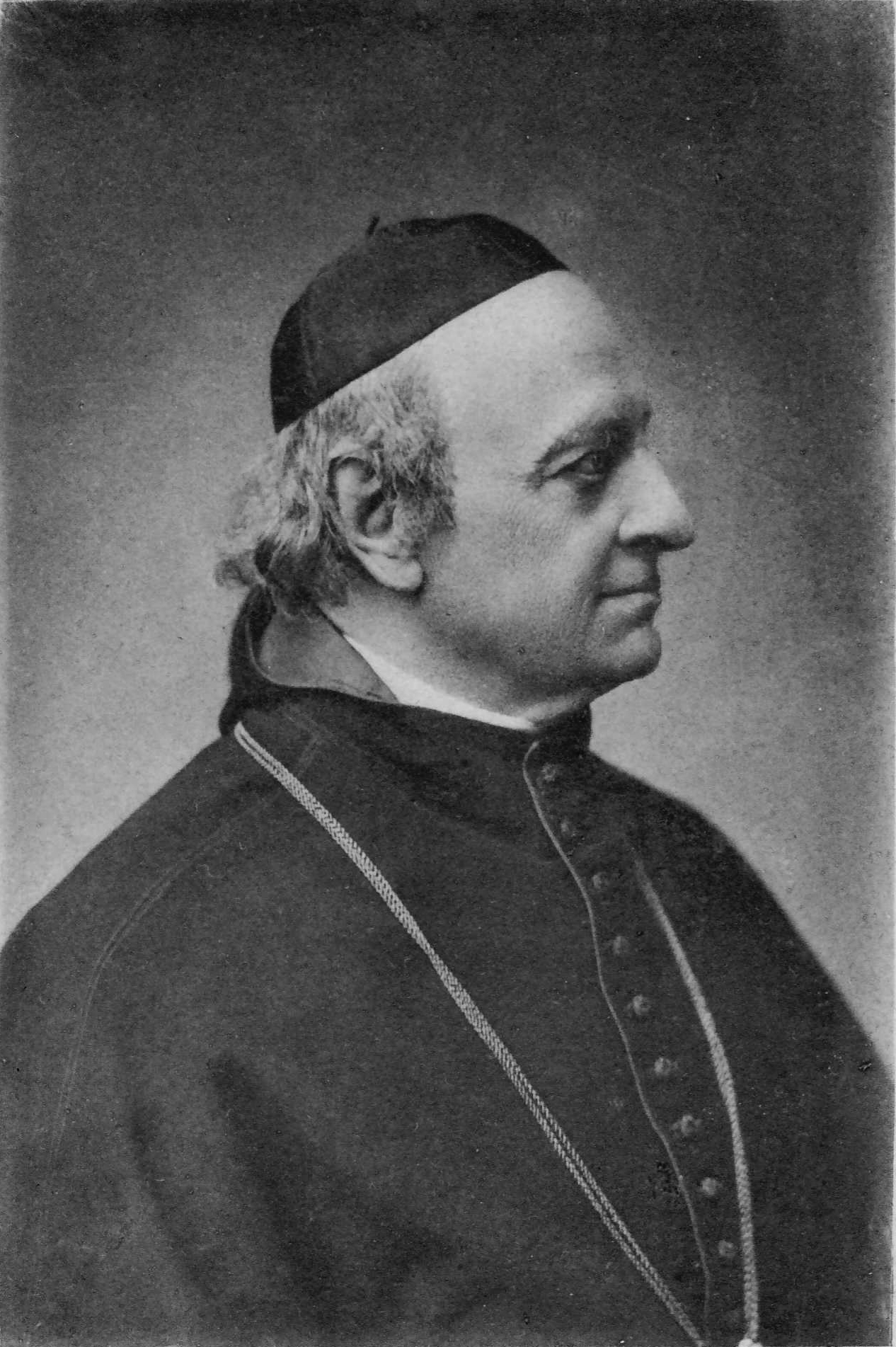
- Photo taken in 1887.
- Church: Roman Catholic Church
- Archdiocese: Olomouc
- See: Olomouc
- Appointed: 27 June 1853
- Term ended: 20 August 1892
- Predecessor: Maximilian Joseph Gottfried Sommerau Beeckh
- Successor: Theodor Kohn
- Other post: Cardinal-Priest of San Crisogono (1880-92)

Orders
- Ordination: 15 October 1836
- Consecration: 4 September 1853 by Friedrich Johann Joseph Cölestin zu von Schwarzenberg
- Created cardinal: 12 May 1879 by Pope Leo XIII
- Rank: Cardinal-Priest

Personal details
- Born: Friedrich Egon von Fürstenberg; 8 October 1813 Vienna, Austrian Empire
- Died: 20 August 1892 (aged 78) Hukvaldy, Austria-Hungary
- Buried: Saint Wenceslas Cathedral
- Parents: Friedrich Carl Fürstenberg; Theresie Schwarzenberg
- Education: University of Vienna; University of Olomouc
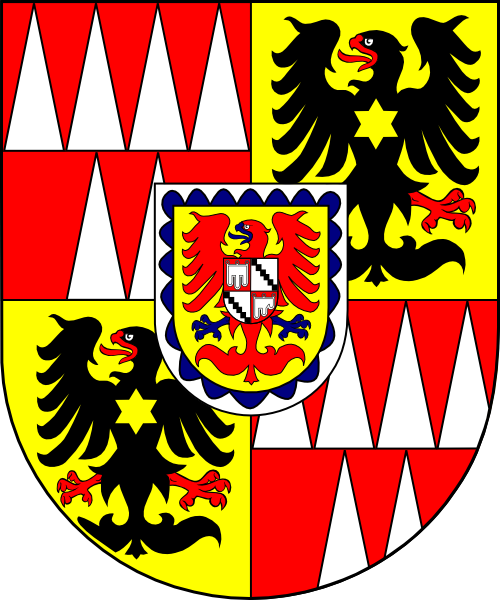
- Coat of arms

Friedrich Egon von Fürstenberg (8 October 1813 – 20 August 1892) was a prelate of the Catholic Church who was archbishop of Olomouc from 1853 until his death almost forty years later. He was made a cardinal in 1879. By birth, he was member of the collateral branch of the House of Fürstenberg.

== Biography ==
Friedrich Egon von Fürstenberg was born in Vienna in the Austrian Empire on 8 October 1813. He had the title of Landgrave; his parents were Landgrave Friedrich Carl zu Fürstenberg-Weitra (1774-1856) and Princess Maria Theresie zu Schwarzenberg (1780-1870). He was the cousin of Cardinal Friedrich Prince zu Schwarzenberg (1809–1885). (Note: Friedrich Egon von Fürstenberg's mother and Friedrich Prince zu Schearzenberg's father, Joseph II (Schwarzenberg) (1769–1833), were siblings, children of Johann I (Schwarzenberg) (1742–1789).)

He chose to pursue a clerical career over his family's opposition. He studied theology at the University of Vienna from 1831 to 1835 and then earned a doctorate in theology at the University of Olomouc in 1838. He became a non-resident canon of the cathedral chapter of Olomouc in 1832 and was ordained a priest on 15 October 1836.

He was chosen archbishop of Olomouc by its chapter on 6 June 1853 and the pope confirmed his appointment on 27 June 1853. He received his episcopal consecration in Olomouc on 4 September 1853 from his cousin Cardinal von Schwarzenberg, the archbishop of Prague.

Pope Leo XIII made him a cardinal priest on 12 May 1879. He received his red galero and the title of San Crisogono on 27 February 1880.

He died in Hukvaldy, Moravia, on 20 August 1892.
