= František Merta =

Czech Catholic priest and convicted pedophile

František Merta (born 31 December 1950) caused a scandal in the Czech Republic in 2000 when, while serving as a Catholic priest in the Olomouc Archdiocese, he was convicted of indecent assault of 20 boys dating back to 1995.

== Scandal ==
Merta was accused by a theology student, Václav Novák, and was sentenced by a criminal court to a two-year suspended sentence. The archbishop of Olomouc, Jan Graubner, was accused of moving Merta to different posts in an attempt to cover up the case. Merta is still employed by the Catholic church as a civil employee in the archdiocese archives, though according to a spokeswoman for the Archdiocese of Olomouc, he has no contact with children. In February 2025 reporters Zuzana Černá and Václav Crhonek from investigative programme of Czech Television Reportéři ČT discovered that Merta continues to exercise clerical ministry. In a direct confrontation, Archbishop Graubner admitted that during his time in Olomouc, Merta had the right of assistance, i.e., he could perform clerical activities. Shortly after publication Merta has been removed from official website of Archdiocese of Olomouc and spokesman later confirmed that for Merta "the possibility of public ministry has been terminated".
