= Velké Opatovice =

- Town
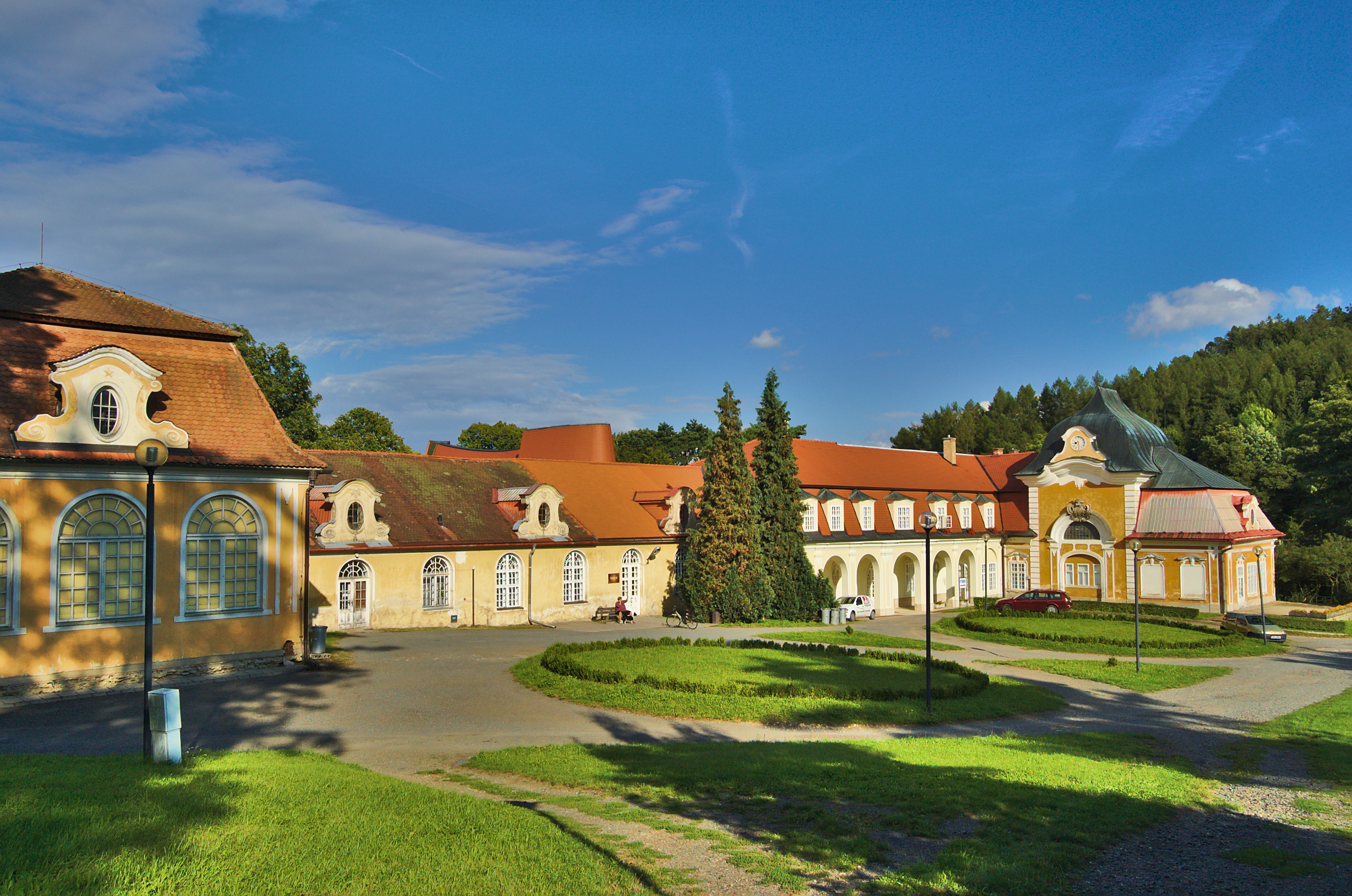
- Velké Opatovice Castle

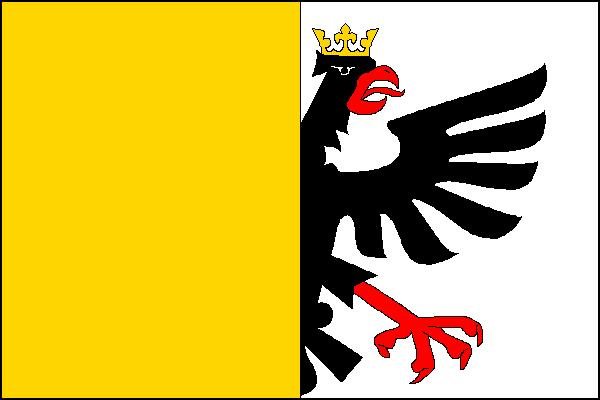
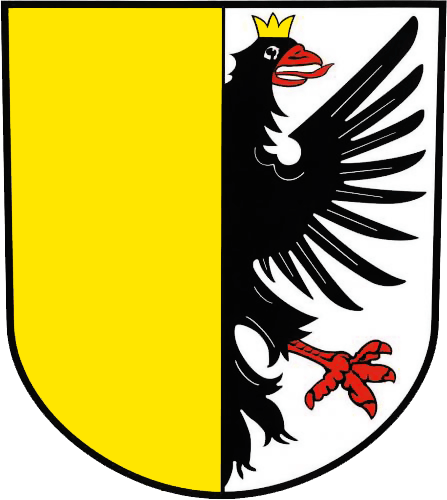
- Flag Coat of arms

- Location in the Czech Republic
- Coordinates: 49°36′45″N 16°40′46″E
- Country: Czech Republic
- Region: South Moravian
- District: Blansko
- First mentioned: 1308

Government
  - Mayor: Kateřina Gerbrichová

Area
  - Total: 25.93 km^{2} (10.01 sq mi)
- Elevation: 376 m (1,234 ft)

Population (2026-01-01)
  - Total: 3,410
  - Density: 132/km^{2} (341/sq mi)
- Time zone: UTC+1 (CET)
  - Summer (DST): UTC+2 (CEST)
- Postal code: 679 63
- Website: www.velkeopatovice.cz

Velké Opatovice (Czech pronunciation: [ˈvɛlkɛː ˈopatovɪtsɛ]; German: Groß Opatowitz) is a town in Blansko District in the South Moravian Region of the Czech Republic. It has about 3,400 inhabitants.

== Administrative division ==
Velké Opatovice consists of six municipal parts (in brackets population according to the 2021 census):

- Velké Opatovice (3,151)
- Bezďečí (55)
- Brťov (81)
- Korbelova Lhota (40)
- Svárov (42)
- Velká Roudka (95)

== Geography ==
Velké Opatovice is located about 27 kilometres (17 mi) north of Blansko and 43 km (27 mi) north of Brno. It lies on the border between the Boskovice Furrow and Orlické Foothills. The highest point is a contour line at 590 m (1,940 ft) above sea level. The Jevíčka Stream flows through the town. The municipality of Malá Roudka forms an enclave in the municipal territory of Velké Opatovice.

== History ==
The first written mention of Opatovice is from 1308. There were two fortresses owned by different lords. It was originally two separate villages called Horní ('upper') Opatovice and Dolní ('lower') Opatovice. In 1848, they were merged and named Opatovice. The prefix velké (meaning 'great') was added in 1888. It 1969, the municipality became a town.

== Demographics ==
Historical population

Year	Pop.	±%
1869	2,197	—
1880	2,231	+1.5%
1890	2,292	+2.7%
1900	2,379	+3.8%
1910	2,437	+2.4%

Year	Pop.	±%
1921	2,498	+2.5%
1930	2,360	−5.5%
1950	1,998	−15.3%
1961	2,481	+24.2%
1970	3,580	+44.3%

Year	Pop.	±%
1980	4,271	+19.3%
1991	4,007	−6.2%
2001	4,192	+4.6%
2011	3,800	−9.4%
2021	3,464	−8.8%

Source: Censuses

== Economy ==
Velké Opatovice is home to one of the largest employers in the region, RHI Magnesita Czech Republic (in 2000–2024 known as P-D Refractories CZ), which is a manufacturer and distributor of refractory products and raw materials. The predecessor of the company, which mined claystone in the area, was founded in 1892. From 1950, the company was known as Moravské šamotové a lupkové závody (i.e. 'Moravian grog and fire clay plants').

== Transport ==
The railway that runs through Velké Opatovice is unused.

== Sights ==
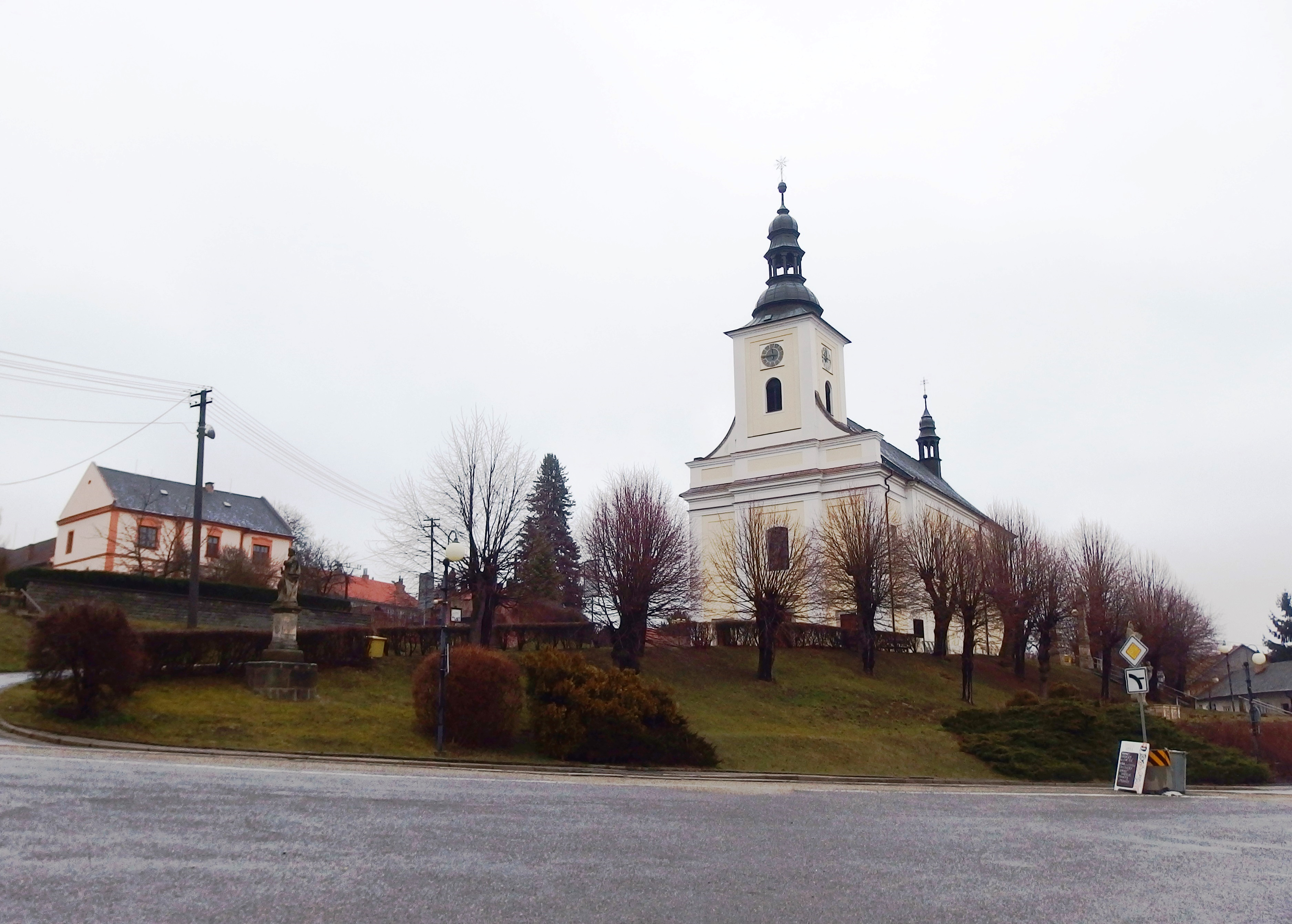
Osvobození Square with the Church of Saint George

Velké Opatovice Castle is the main monument. The Baroque castle was built on the site of a Gothic fortress in 1757. The Art Nouveau modifications were made in 1913. Since 1924, it is a property of the town. After a fire in 1973, it was partially repaired in the late Baroque style. Today the castle complex houses the town hall, a cinema, and two museums.

The Moravian Cartographic Centre is focused on historical development of cartography, especially in the Czech Republic and on geodetic and cartographic instruments and aids. The main exhibit is a plastic map of the lands of Moravia and Silesia with an area of 100 square metres (1,100 sq ft).

The Museum and Monument of Velké Opatovice presents historic and ethnographic collections, local industry, and works of local artists. It also includes the memorial hall of the sculptor Karel Otáhal, who lived here for 29 years. Otáhal is also the creator of a lifesize statue of Bedřich Smetana located in the castle grounds.

The Church of Saint George was built in 1790–1791 and replaced an old Gothic church from the late 14th century. Its main attraction is the altar sculpture from 1951 by Karel Otáhal, depicting St. George fighting with the dragon.

== Notable people ==
- Karel Otáhal (1901–1972), sculptor; lived and died here
- Josef Hrdlička (born 1942), Roman Catholic prelate

== Twin towns – sister cities ==
Velké Opatovice is twinned with:

- Elbingerode, Germany
- Stari Grad, Croatia
