= Vizovice =

- Town
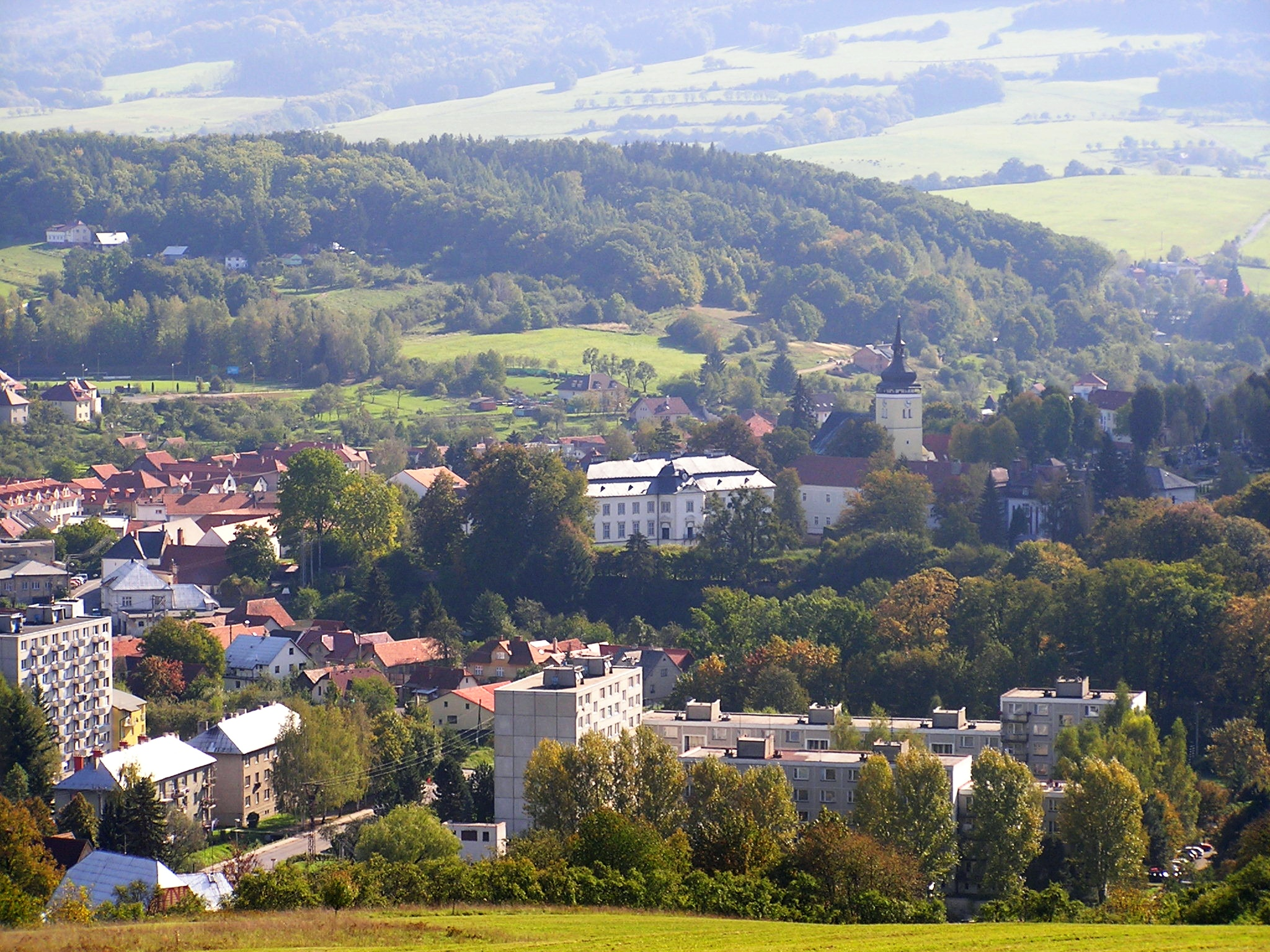
- General view of Vizovice

- Flag Coat of arms

- Location in the Czech Republic
- Coordinates: 49°13′22″N 17°51′16″E
- Country: Czech Republic
- Region: Zlín
- District: Zlín
- First mentioned: 1261

Government
  - Mayor: Silvie Dolanská

Area
  - Total: 28.57 km^{2} (11.03 sq mi)
- Elevation: 296 m (971 ft)

Population (2026-01-01)
  - Total: 4,776
  - Density: 167.2/km^{2} (433.0/sq mi)
- Time zone: UTC+1 (CET)
  - Summer (DST): UTC+2 (CEST)
- Postal code: 763 12
- Website: mestovizovice.cz

Vizovice (Czech pronunciation: [ˈvɪzovɪtsɛ]; German: Wisowitz) is a town in Zlín District in the Zlín Region of the Czech Republic. It has about 4,800 inhabitants. The town is located on the Lutoninka Stream in the Vizovice Highlands.

Vizovice is known for its long tradition of slivovitz production, which has been produced here since the 16th century. The historic town centre is well preserved and is protected as an urban monument zone. The most important monument is the Vizovice Castle, protected as a national cultural monument.

== Administrative division ==
Vizovice consists of two municipal parts (in brackets population according to the 2021 census):

- Vizovice (4,659)
- Chrastěšov (192)

== Geography ==
Vizovice is located about 12 kilometres (7 mi) east of Zlín. It lies in the Vizovice Highlands. The highest point is a hill at 662 m (2,172 ft) above sea level. The Lutoninka Stream flows through the town.

== History ==
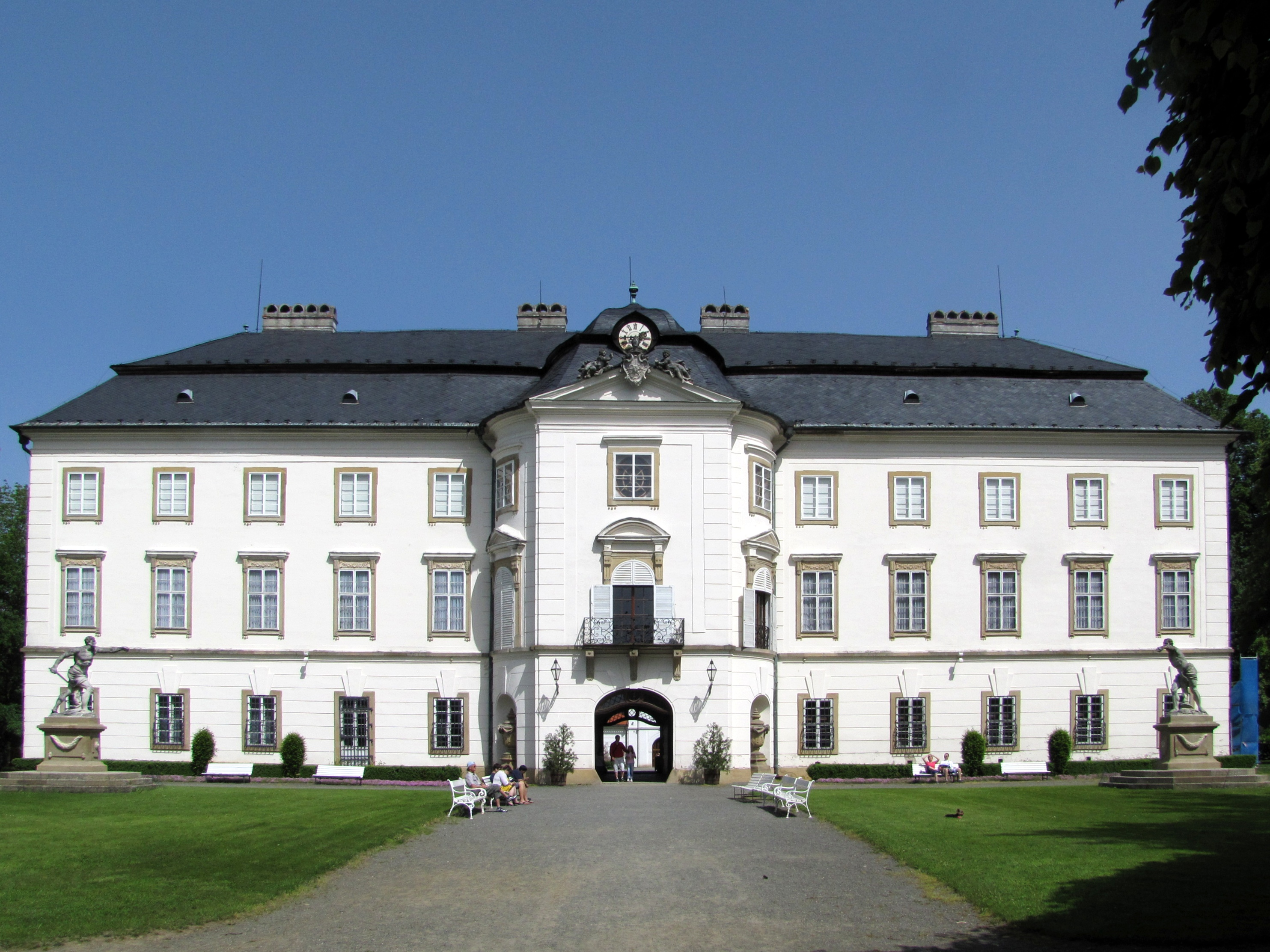
Vizovice Castle

The first written mention of Vizovice is from 1261, when it was owned by the newly established Smilheim monastery. During the Hussite Wars, the monastery and the village were badly damaged and looted. In 1485, during the rule of the Lords of Kunštát, the Cistercian monastery was definitely abolished.

In 1567, the estate was bought by Zdeněk Kavka of Říčany, who had built a Renaissance residence called Nový Smilheim in the fortified area of the abolished monastery. Vizovice was promoted to a town in 1570 by Emperor Maximilian II. This began a period of development of crafts, which brought prosperity to Vizovice. In the second half of the 17th century, the estate became a property of the Gollen family. Shortly after, the town and the castle were burned down by Turkish invaders. In 1749–1770, during the rule of Count Hermann Hannibal of Blümegen, a new Baroque castle with French and English garden was built.

== Demographics ==
Historical population

Year	Pop.	±%
1869	2,834	—
1880	2,784	−1.8%
1890	2,757	−1.0%
1900	2,841	+3.0%
1910	2,895	+1.9%

Year	Pop.	±%
1921	3,178	+9.8%
1930	3,495	+10.0%
1950	3,717	+6.4%
1961	3,981	+7.1%
1970	3,843	−3.5%

Year	Pop.	±%
1980	4,251	+10.6%
1991	4,355	+2.4%
2001	4,501	+3.4%
2011	4,673	+3.8%
2021	4,851	+3.8%

Source: Censuses

== Economy ==
Vizovice has long history of the alcohol production. A distillery in Vizovice was first documented in 1585. The local climate is suitable for fruit trees, especially plums, and in the mid-18th century, slivovitz started being produced here. The Rudolf Jelínek distillery was founded here in 1882.

== Transport ==
The I/49 road, which connects Zlín with the Czech–Slovak border in Střelná, runs through the town. The I/69 road connects Vizovice with Vsetín.

Vizovice is the terminus and start of the railway line to Otrokovice via Zlín.

== Culture ==
The annual Masters of Rock heavy metal festival takes place in Vizovice.

== Sights ==
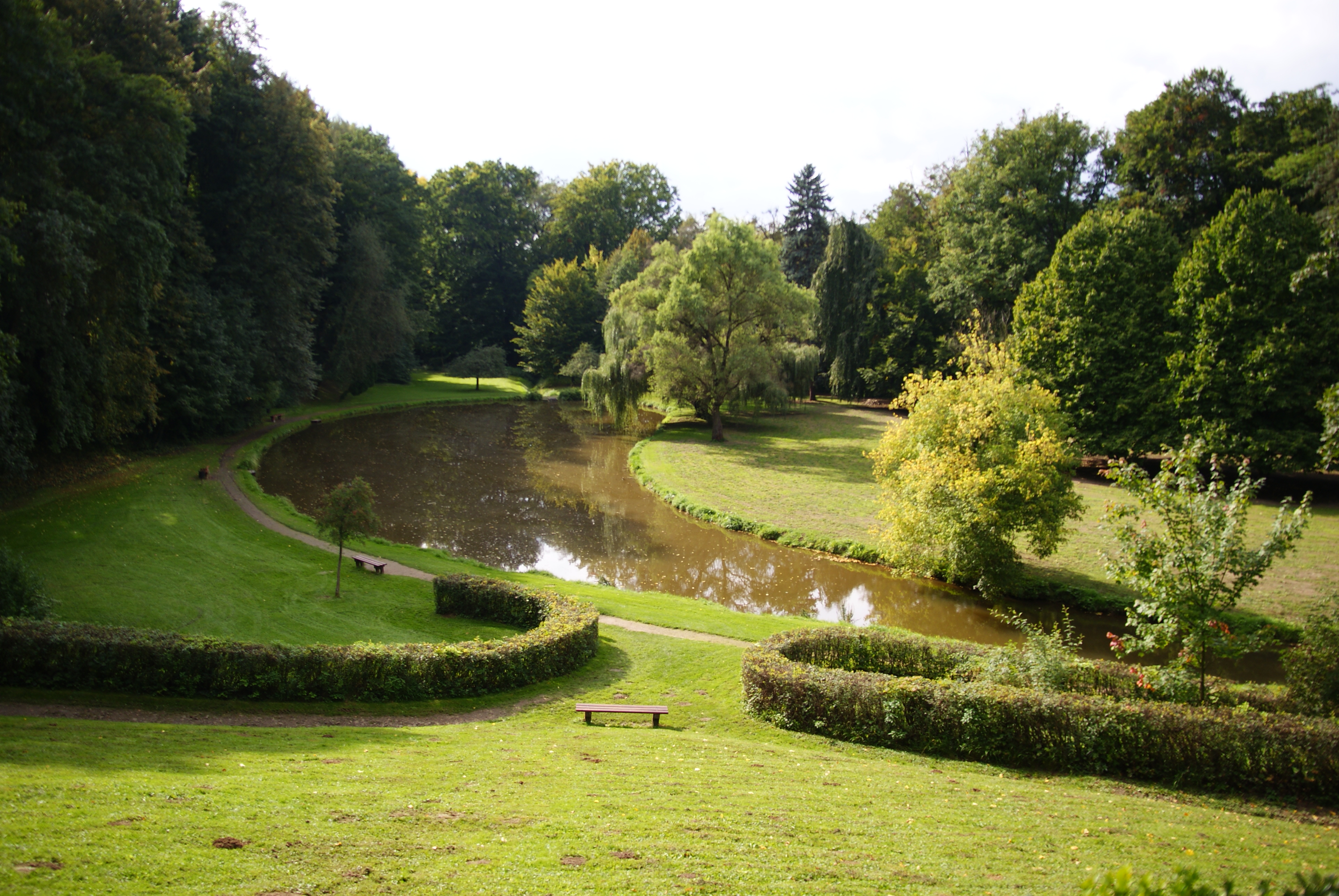
Castle park

The main landmark is the Vizovice Castle. It was built in 1749–1770 according to the design by František Antonín Grimm. For its architectural value, the castle is protected as a national cultural monument. In 1945, the castle was nationalised. It is open to the public and offers guided tours.

A notable building is the Church of Saint Lawrence. It was built at the end of the 18th century.

== Notable people ==
- Alois Hába (1893–1973), composer
- Jan Graubner (born 1948), Archbishop of Olomouc; worked here as a parson in 1982–1990
- Bolek Polívka (born 1949), actor
