= Malá Roudka =

- Municipality
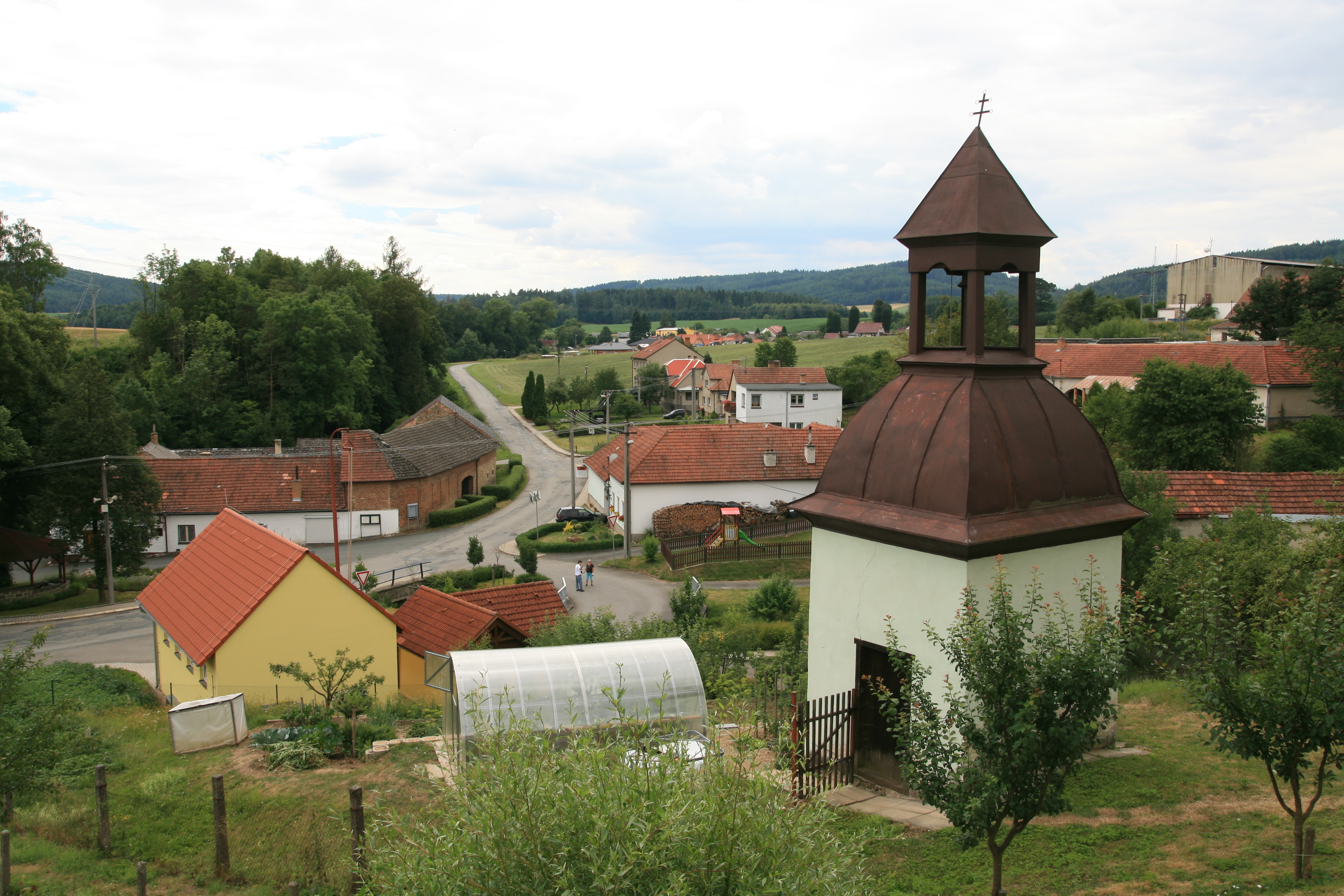
- Skočova Lhota, a part of Malá Roudka

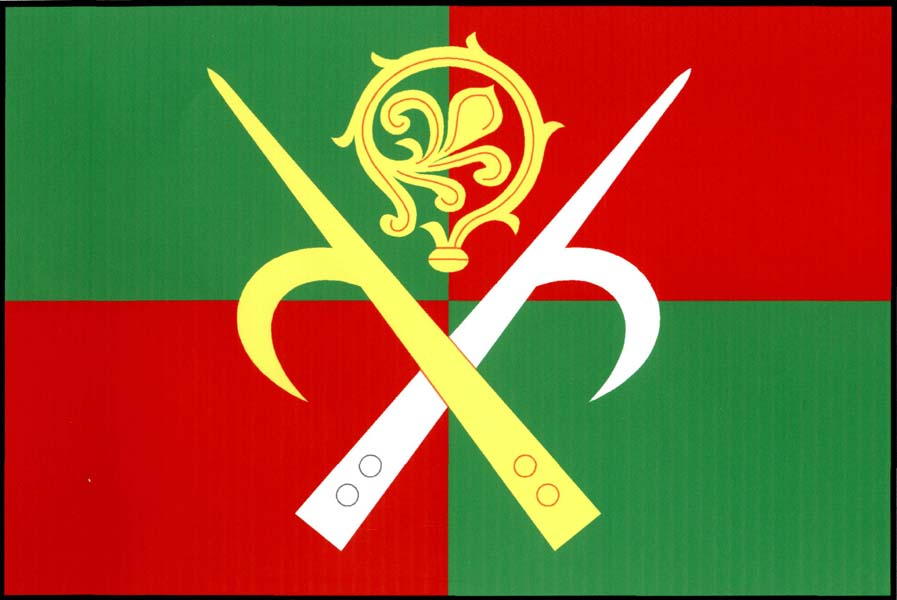
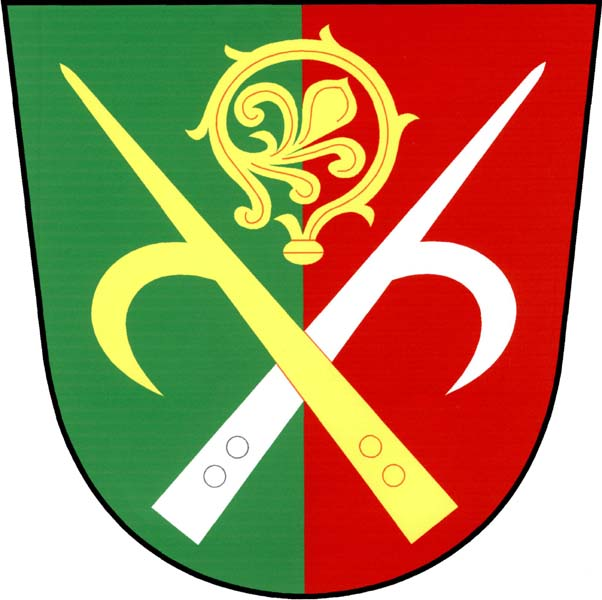
- Flag Coat of arms

- Location in the Czech Republic
- Coordinates: 49°36′6″N 16°38′40″E
- Country: Czech Republic
- Region: South Moravian
- District: Blansko
- First mentioned: 1373

Area
  - Total: 3.86 km^{2} (1.49 sq mi)
- Elevation: 422 m (1,385 ft)

Population (2026-01-01)
  - Total: 209
  - Density: 54.1/km^{2} (140/sq mi)
- Time zone: UTC+1 (CET)
  - Summer (DST): UTC+2 (CEST)
- Postal code: 679 63
- Website: www.malaroudka.cz

Malá Roudka is a municipality and village in Blansko District in the South Moravian Region of the Czech Republic. It has about 200 inhabitants. The municipality forms an enclave in the territory of Velké Opatovice.

Malá Roudka lies approximately 27 kilometres (17 mi) north of Blansko, 45 km (28 mi) north of Brno, and 168 km (104 mi) east of Prague.

== Administrative division ==
Malá Roudka consists of two municipal parts (in brackets population according to the 2021 census):

- Malá Roudka (94)
- Skočova Lhota (92)

== Demographics ==
Historical population
Year	Pop.	±%
1869	199	—
1880	216	+8.5%
1890	215	−0.5%
1900	191	−11.2%
1910	204	+6.8%
1921	233	+14.2%
1930	221	−5.2%
1950	164	−25.8%
1961	171	+4.3%
1970	174	+1.8%
1980	185	+6.3%
1991	204	+10.3%
2001	203	−0.5%
2011	168	−17.2%
2021	186	+10.7%
Source: Censuses
