= Archdiocese of Olomouc =

Roman Catholic archdiocese in Czechia

Metropolitan Archdiocese of Olomouc Archidioecesis Metropolitae Olomucensis Metropolitní Arcidiecéze Olomouc

catholic
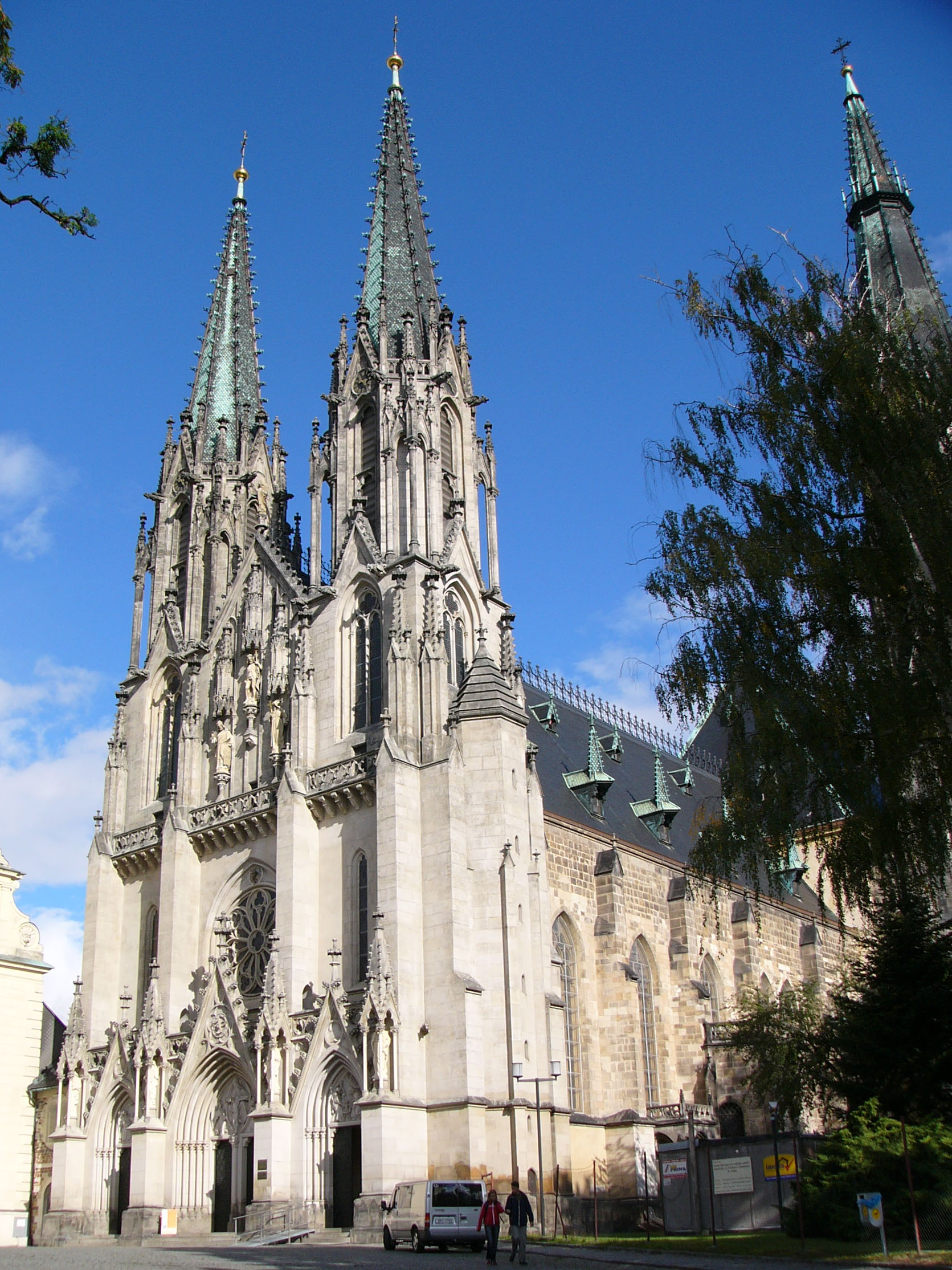
- Cathedral of St. Wenceslaus

- Coat of arms

Location
- Country: Czech Republic
- Coordinates: 49°35′45″N 17°15′40″E

Statistics
- Area: 10,018 km^{2} (3,868 sq mi)
- Population: Total; Catholics: (as of 2019); 1,359,847; 737,300 (54,2%)

Information
- Denomination: Catholic Church
- Rite: Latin Rite
- Cathedral: Cathedral of St. Wenceslaus
- Patron saint: Wenceslaus

Current leadership
- Pope: Leo XIV
- Metropolitan Archbishop: Josef Nuzík
- Auxiliary Bishops: Antonín Basler
- Bishops emeritus: Josef Hrdlička

Map
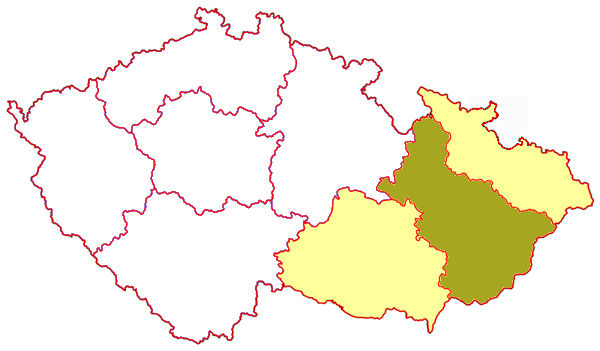

Website
- www.ado.cz

The Roman Catholic Metropolitan Archdiocese of Olomouc (Czech: Metropolitní Arcidiecéze olomoucká, Latin: Archidioecesis Metropolitae Olomucensis) is a metropolitan archdiocese of the Latin Church of the Catholic Church in the Czech Republic. It has its seat in Olomouc.

== Special churches ==
Its cathedral is Cathedral of St. Wenceslaus in Olomouc and it has three Marian minor basilicas:

- Basilica of the Assumption of the Virgin Mary in Hostýn, Zlín Region
- Basilica of the Assumption of the Virgin Mary and Saints Cyril and Methodius in Velehrad, Zlín Region
- Basilica of the Visitation of the Virgin Mary in Olomouc, Olomouc Region

== Statistics ==
As of 2015, it pastorally served 746,900 Catholics (53.0% of 1,410,000 total) on 10,018 km^{2} in 418 parishes and 2 missions with 343 priests (246 diocesan, 97 religious), 33 deacons, 326 lay religious (117 brothers, 209 sisters) and 19 seminarians.

== Ecclesiastical province ==
Its suffragan sees are :

- Roman Catholic Diocese of Brno
- Roman Catholic Diocese of Ostrava-Opava

== History ==
Established in 1063 as Diocese of Olomouc / Olomucen(sis) (Latin), on territory split off from the then Diocese of Prague (now Metropolitan) and promoted on 5 December 1777 to Metropolitan Archdiocese of Olomouc / Olomucen(sis) (Latin) (lost territory to establish Diocese of Brno). In 1788 it gained territory from the Diocese of Wrocław (Breslau, Silesia), in 1863 exchanged territory with Moravian Diocese of Brno.

- 15 March 1945: Lost territory to establish Apostolic Administration of Opole
- 31 May 1978: Gained territory from the suppressed Apostolic Administration of Český Těšín
- It was visited Pope John Paul II in April 1990 and May 1995.
- 30 May 1996: Lost territory to establish Diocese of Ostrava-Opava as its suffragan

== Episcopal ordinaries ==
Suffragan Bishops of Olomouc

- Jan (John) (1063–1085)
- Vezel (1088–1091)
- Ondřej (1091–1096)
- Jindřich (1096–1099)
- Petr (1099–1104)
- Jan (1104–1126)
- Jindřich Zdík, Norbertines (O. Praem.) (1126–1151)
- Jan (1151–1157)
- Jan of Litomyšl (1157–1172)
- Dětleb (1172–1182)
- Pelhřim (1182–1184)
- Kaim of Bohemia (1184–1194)
- Engelbert von Brabant (1194–1199)
- Jan Bavor (1199–1201)
- Robert (1201–1240)
- Father Wilhelm (1241–1245 not possessed)
- Konrad von Friedberg (1241–1245)
- ...
  - Auxiliary Bishop: Vilem Kolina, O.E.S.A. (16 May 1442 – 1482?)
- ...
  - Auxiliary Bishop: André Byssmann, O.E.S.A. (21 June 1482 – 1501)
- ...
- Cardinal Franz (Seraph) von Dietrichstein (1599.09.01 – 1636.11.23)
  - Auxiliary Bishop: Giovanni Battista Civalli, O.F.M. Conv. (1608.01.28 – 1617.01.29)
  - Auxiliary Bishop: Philipp Friedrich Reichsfreiherr von Breuner (1630.09.09 – 1639.09.05)
- Fr. Archduke Leopold Wilhelm of Austria (1637.11.16 – 1662.11.02)
  - Auxiliary Bishop: Sigismund Graf Miutini von Spilenberg (1648.03.30 – 1653)
  - Auxiliary Bishop: Johann Gobar (1652.08.26 – 1665)
- Fr. Karl Joseph Erzherzog von Österreich (1663.04.23 – 1664.01.27)
- Karl Graf von Liechtenstein-Kastelkorn (1664.03.12 – 1695.09.23)
  - Auxiliary Bishop: Alexander Dirre (1668.06.11 – 1669.11.21)
  - Auxiliary Bishop: Archbishop Johann Joseph Reichsgraf von Breuner (1670.12.15 – 1695.07.04)
  - Coadjutor Bishop: Franciscus Antonius von und zu Losenstein (1690.11.27 – 1692.06.17)
- Fr. Karl Joseph von Lothringen (1694.09.13 – 1698.09.29)
  - Auxiliary Bishop: Ferdinand Schröffel (1696.12.03 – 1702.08.23)
- Cardinal Wolfgang Hannibal von Schrattenbach (1711.09.15 – 1738.07.22)
- Jakob Ernst Graf von Liechtenstein-Kastelkorn (1738.10.11 – 1745.03.04)
- Cardinal Ferdinand Julius von Troyer (1745.12.09 – 1758.02.05)
- Leopold Friedrich Reichsgraf von Egkh und Hungersbach (1758.04.27 – 1760.12.15)
- Maximilian Reichsgraf von Hamilton (1761.03.04 – 1776.10.31)
- Cardinal Antonín Theodor Count of Colloredo-Waldsee (1777.10.06 – 1777.12.05)

Metropolitan Archbishops of Olomouc

- Cardinal Antonín Theodor Count of Colloredo-Waldsee (1777.12.05 – 1811.09.12)
- Cardinal Maria-Thaddeus von Trauttmansdorf-Wiesnberg (1811.11.26 – 1819.01.20)
- Cardinal Rudolf Johannes Joseph Rainier von Habsburg-Lotharingen (1819.03.24 – 1831.07.24)
  - Coadjutor Archbishop: Archbishop-elect Rudolf Johannes Joseph Rainier von Habsburg-Lotharingen (later Cardinal) (1805.06.24 – 1811.09.15)
- Ferdinand Maria von Chotek (1832.02.24 – 1836.09.05)
- Cardinal Maximilian Joseph Gottfried Sommerau Beeckh (1836.11.21 – 1853.03.31)
- Cardinal Friedrich Egon von Fürstenberg (1853.06.27 – 1892.08.20)
- Théodore Kohn (1893.01.16 – 1904.06.10)
- Cardinal Frantisek Salesky Bauer (1904.05.10 – 1915.11.25)
- Cardinal Lev Skrbenský z Hřiště (1916.05.05 – 1920.07.06)
- Antonín Cyril Stojan (1921.03.10 – 1923)
- Leopoldo Precan (1923.11.10 – 1947.03.02)
- Joseph Matocha (1948.03.23 – 1961.11.03)
  - Apostolic Administrator Josef Vrana (1973.02.19 – 1987.11.30)
  - Apostolic Administrator František Vanák (1989.07.26 – 1989.12.21)
- František Vanák (1989.12.21 – 1991.09.14)
- Jan Graubner (1992.09.28 – 2022.05.13)
- Josef Nuzík (2024.02.09 - ...)
  - Auxiliary Bishop (2017.07.05 – ...): Antonín Basler, Titular Bishop of Vaga (2017.07.05 – ...)
  - Auxiliary Bishop (2017.07.05 – ...): Josef Nuzík, Titular Bishop of Castra Galbæ (2017.07.05 – 2024.02.09)

=== Auxiliary bishops ===
  - Josef Nuzík (2017.07.05 – 2024.02.09)
  - Antonín Basler (2017.07.05 – )
  - Josef Hrdlička (1990.03.17 – 2017.02.01)
  - Archbishop Jan Graubner (1990.03.17 – 1992.09.28)
  - Cardinal František Tomášek (1949.10.12 – 1977.12.30)
  - Joseph Martin Nathan (1943.04.17 – 1947.01.30)
  - Stanislav Zela (1940.10.11 – 1969.12.06)
  - Giovanni Stavel (1927.04.29 – 1938.11.06)
  - Josef Schinzel (1922.11.14 – 1944.07.28)
  - Guglielmo Blazek (1906.12.06 – 1912.03.05)
  - Carlo Wisnar (1904.11.14 – 1926.04.18)
  - Jan Nepomuk Weinlich (1904.11.14 – 1905.12.24)
  - Gustavo de Belrupt-Tyssac (1880.12.13 – 1895.06.09)
  - Rodolpho von Thysebaert (1842.05.23 – 1868.05.12)
  - Archbishop Alois Josef Schrenk (1838.02.12 – 1838.09.17)
  - Bishop-elect Franz Anton Gindl (1831.09.30 – 1831.11.16)
  - Ferdinand Maria von Chotek (later Archbishop) (1817.04.14 – 1831.09.30)
  - Alois Jozef Krakowski von Kolowrat (later Archbishop) (1800.12.22 – 1815.03.15)
  - Karl Godefried Ritter von Rosenthal (1779.03.01 – 1800.05.25)
  - Joannes Wenceslaus von Freyenfels (1771.12.16 – 1776.10.17)
  - Matthias Franz Reichsgraf von Chorinsky (1769.09.11 – 1777.12.15)
  - Johann Karl Leopold Graf von Scherffenberg (1749.04.21 – 1771.04.17)
  - Otto Honorius Reichsgraf von Egkh und Hungersbach (1729.08.03 – 1748.04.30)
  - Franz Julian Graf von Braida (1703.06.04 – 1727)

== Patron saints ==
Patron saints of the Archdiocese of Olomouc include: Wenceslaus (primary), Cyril and Methodius, the Five Martyr Brothers, Adalbert of Prague, Vitus, Procopius of Sázava, Cordula of Cologne, Ludmila and Paulina of Rome.

== See also ==
- List of Catholic dioceses in the Czech Republic
- List of Roman Catholic bishops and archbishops of Olomouc
- František Merta, a priest of the archdiocese convicted of child sexual abuse case
