= Saint Wenceslas Cathedral =

Cathedral of St Wenceslas
- Katedrála svatého Václava
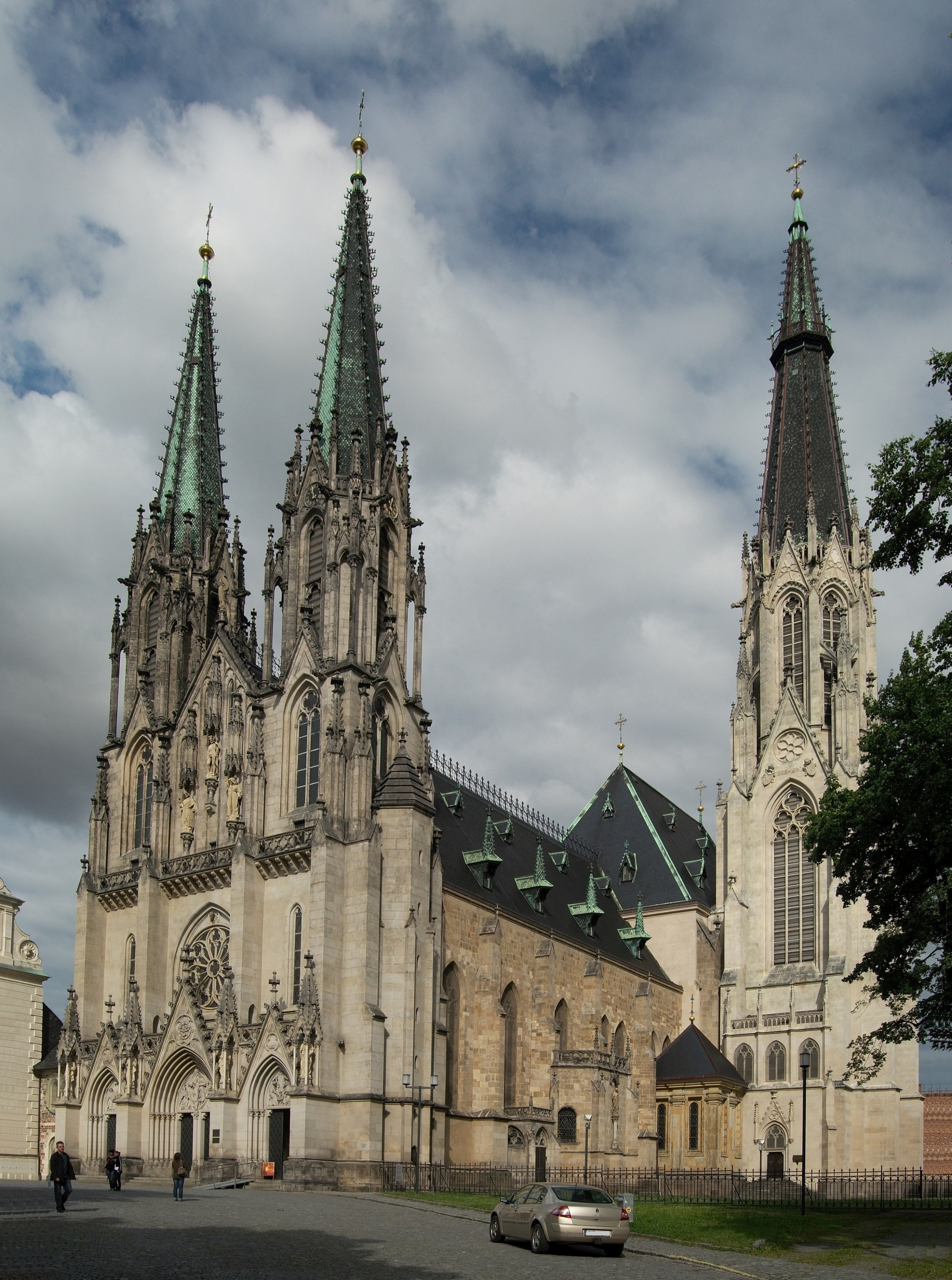

- Location in Czech Republic
- 49°35′52″N 17°15′45″E
- Location: Olomouc
- Country: Czech Republic
- Denomination: Roman Catholic
- Website: Website of the Cathedral

History
- Status: Active
- Founded: 1107
- Dedication: St Wenceslaus
- Consecrated: 30 June 1131

Architecture
- Functional status: Cathedral
- Architectural type: Church
- Style: Gothic

Administration
- Diocese: Olomouc

Clergy
- Archbishop: Jan Graubner
- Rector: Ladislav Švirák

Sound of the Catherdal's bells in 1933

Saint Wenceslas Cathedral (Czech: Katedrála svatého Václava) is a neogothic cathedral at Wenceslas Square in Olomouc, in the Czech Republic, founded in 1107. The square was named after Saint Wenceslaus I, Duke of Bohemia on the thousandth anniversary of his death in 935. The cathedral is also named after him.

The cathedral is the seat of the Roman Catholic Archdiocese of Olomouc.

== History ==
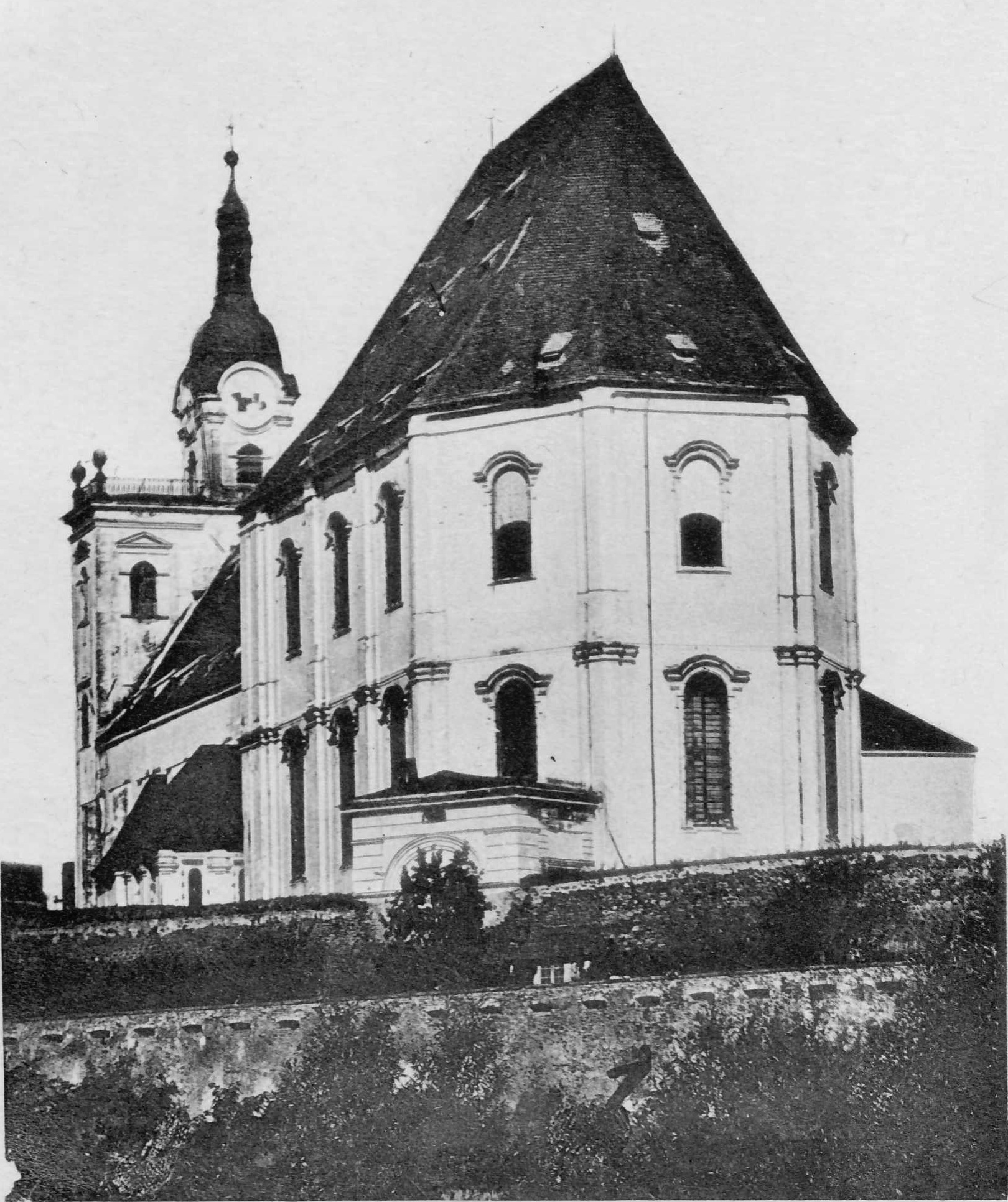
The cathedral before the 1880s reconstruction campaign

The cathedral began in the Romanesque style and was consecrated in 1131. Extensive Gothic modifications were made in the 13th and 14th century.

Bohemian king Wenceslaus III of Bohemia was murdered in a nearby house of the former dean of the cathedral on 4 August 1306. Wenceslaus III was the last of the male Přemyslid rulers of Bohemia.

Gothic revival changes, which included refacing the building, rebuilding the west front and the construction of the central tower, were made during 1883–1892. These were designed by Gustav Meretta and R. Völkel.

The cathedral was restored in 2004–2007.

== Architecture ==
The cathedral is formed by three towers. The front two form the front, while the third one in the back, the southern tower, is with its 100.65 metres (330.2 ft) height the tallest church tower in Moravia, and the second tallest church tower in the Czech Republic.
