= Dražovice (Vyškov District) =

- Municipality
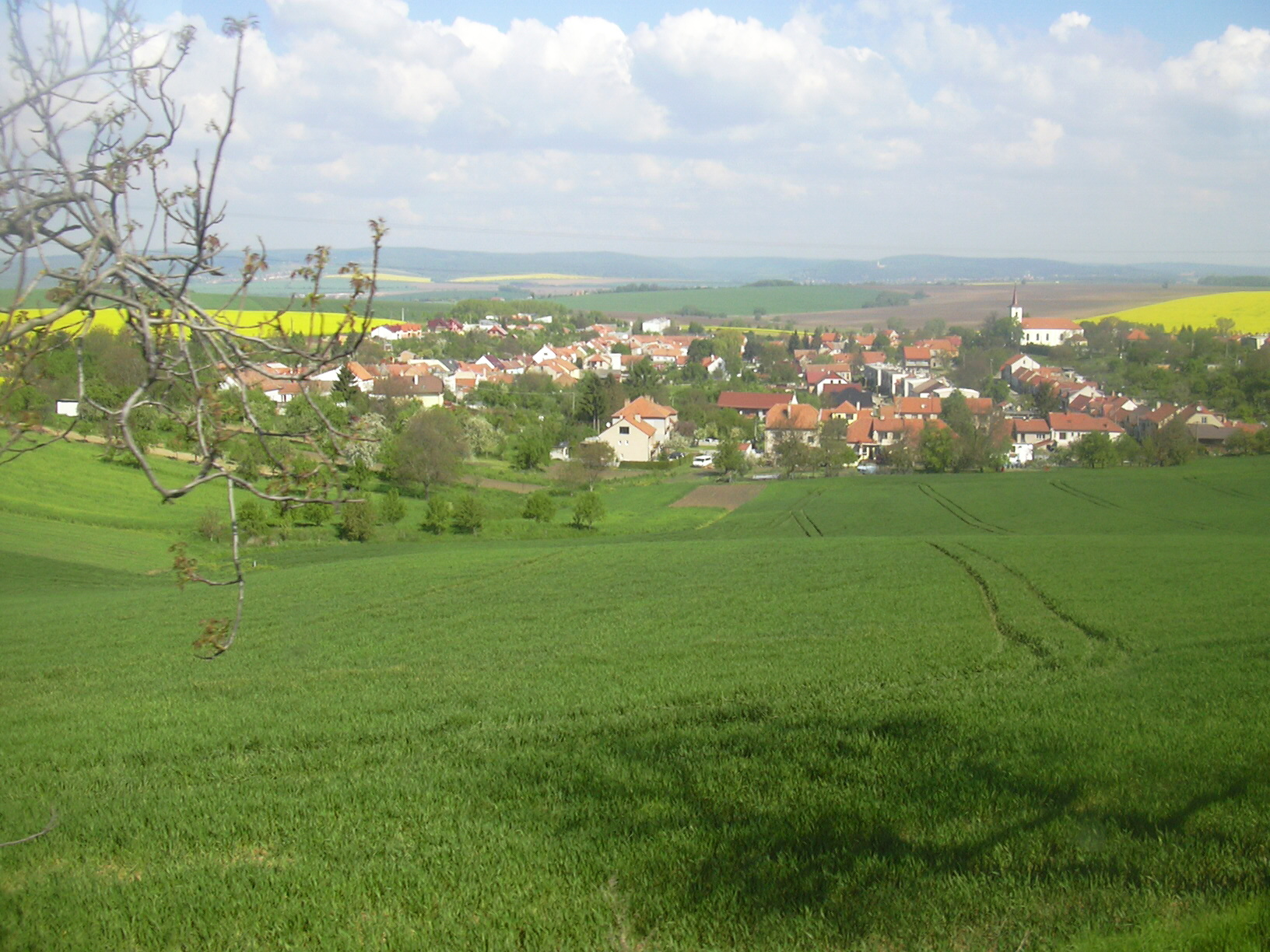
- General view

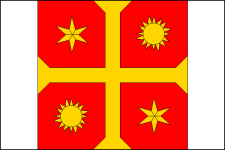
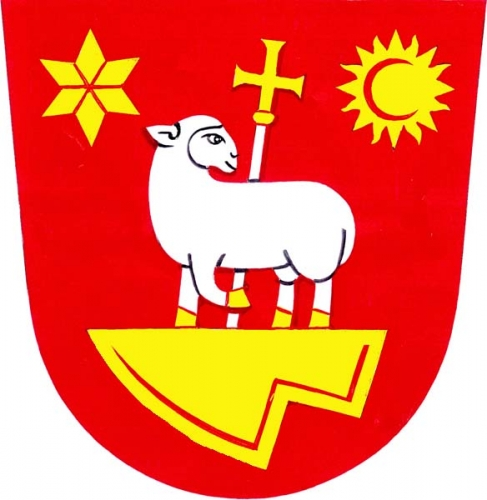
- Flag Coat of arms

- Location in the Czech Republic
- Coordinates: 49°11′41″N 16°56′36″E
- Country: Czech Republic
- Region: South Moravian
- District: Vyškov
- First mentioned: 1131

Area
  - Total: 6.40 km^{2} (2.47 sq mi)
- Elevation: 247 m (810 ft)

Population (2026-01-01)
  - Total: 965
  - Density: 151/km^{2} (391/sq mi)
- Time zone: UTC+1 (CET)
  - Summer (DST): UTC+2 (CEST)
- Postal code: 683 01
- Website: www.drazovice.cz

Dražovice is a municipality and village in Vyškov District in the South Moravian Region of the Czech Republic. It has about 1,000 inhabitants.

Dražovice lies approximately 10 kilometres (6 mi) south-west of Vyškov, 24 km (15 mi) east of Brno, and 208 km (129 mi) south-east of Prague.

== Demographics ==
Historical population
Year	Pop.	±%
1869	505	—
1880	537	+6.3%
1890	568	+5.8%
1900	606	+6.7%
1910	628	+3.6%
1921	681	+8.4%
1930	802	+17.8%
1950	772	−3.7%
1961	863	+11.8%
1970	831	−3.7%
1980	810	−2.5%
1991	781	−3.6%
2001	826	+5.8%
2011	856	+3.6%
2021	937	+9.5%
Source: Censuses
