= Jan Graubner =

Czech prelate

His Excellency Jan Graubner
- Metropolitan Archbishop Emeritus of Prague
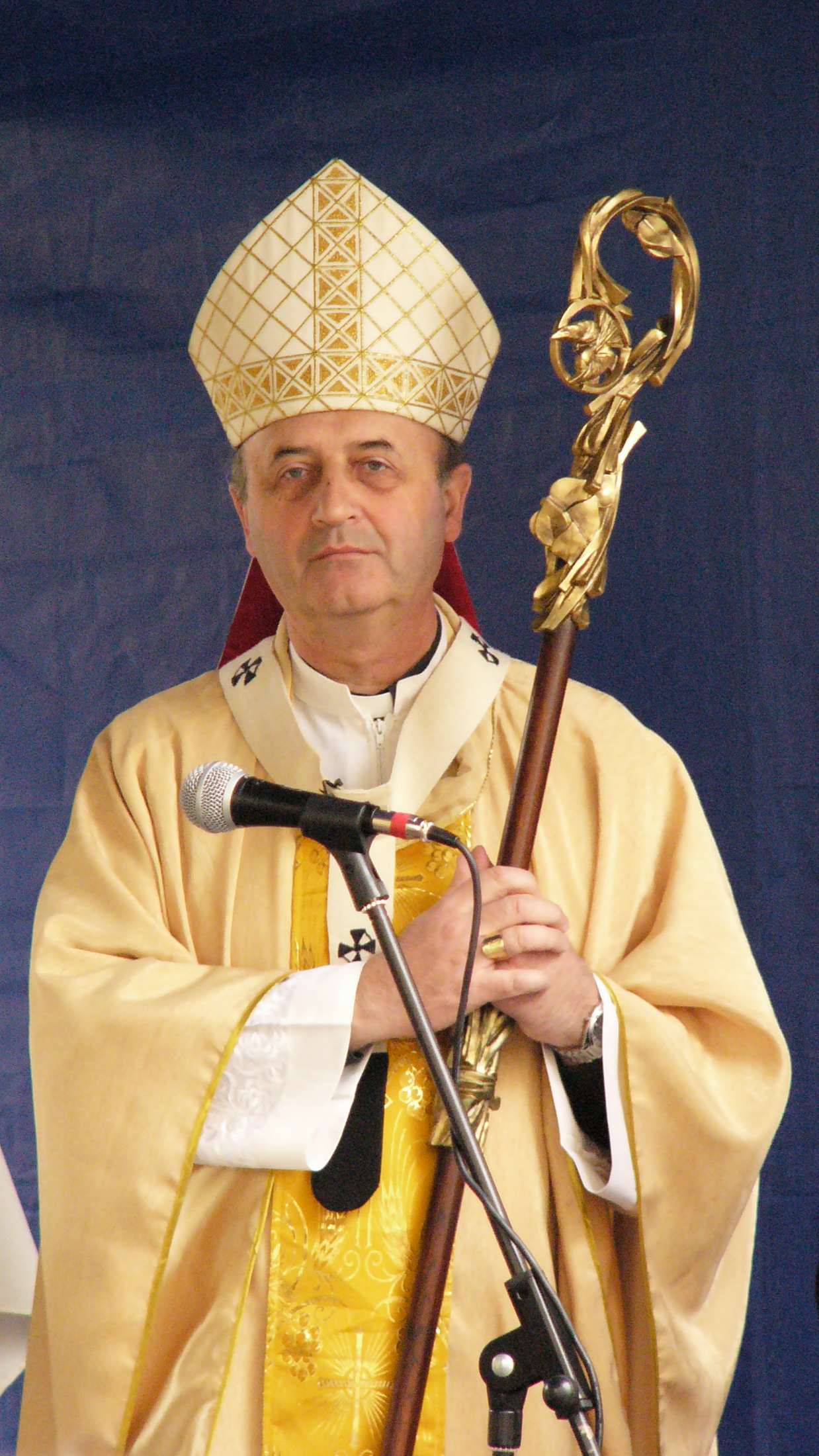
- Jan Graubner while archbishop of Olomouc
- Church: Roman Catholic
- Archdiocese: Prague
- Appointed: 13 May 2022
- Installed: 2 July 2022
- Term ended: 2 February 2026
- Predecessor: Dominik Duka
- Successor: Stanislav Přibyl
- Previous post: Metropolitan Archbishop of Olomouc (1992–2022)

Orders
- Ordination: 23 June 1973
- Consecration: 7 April 1990 by František Vaňák

Personal details
- Born: 29 August 1948 (age 77) Brno, Czechoslovakia
- Motto: Quod dixerit vobis, facite ("Do what he tells you.")
- Coat of arms

Jan Graubner (born 29 August 1948) is a Czech prelate of the Catholic Church who was Metropolitan Archbishop of Prague from 2022 to 2026. He was Metropolitan Archbishop of Olomouc in the Czech Republic from 1992 to 2022, after serving as an auxiliary there for two years.

== Biography ==
Jan Graubner was born in Brno in 29 August 1948. He graduated from high school in Strážnice in 1967 and then became an engineering worker in Považská Bystrica. In 1968 he was admitted to the Major Seminary of Olomouc. On 23 June 1973 he was ordained a priest for that archdiocese. From October 1973 to September 1975 he carried out his military service while also working as a chaplain in Zlín at the same time. From 1977 to 1982 he was chaplain in Valašské Klobouky. From 1982 to 1990 he was administrator of the Parish of Vizovice, with responsibility for the pilgrimage site of Provodov and the parish of Horní Lhota near Luhačovice.

On 17 March 1990 he was appointed titular bishop of Tagaria and auxiliary bishop of Olomouc. He received episcopal ordination on the 7 April. On 28 September 1992 he was promoted to Metropolitan Archbishop of Olomouc.

Beginning in 1991 he was president of Czech Catholic Charity. He was president of the Czech Episcopal Conference from 2000 to 2010 and was elected to another term in 2022. He has also been president of its Commission on Charity and delegate for the Missions.

In 2008, he received the Order of Tomáš Garrigue Masaryk from former President Václav Klaus for outstanding merits in the development of democracy and human rights.

In 2020, he contracted the Covid virus and came close to dying.

On 13 May 2022, Pope Francis appointed him Archbishop of Prague. He was installed there on 2 July. His appointment was surprising because he is so close to retirement age and he has never worked outside of Moravia.

Pope Leo XIV accepted his resignation as archbishop of Prague on 2 February 2026.

Graubner is the Grand Prior of the Czech Republic Lieutenancy of the Equestrian Order of the Holy Sepulchre of Jerusalem.

== Priestly sexual abuse ==
In 2000, a student at Palacký University of Olomouc Saints Cyril and Methodius Faculty of Theology filed criminal charges against both Graubner and one of his priests, František Merta. The student accused Merta of sexual abuse of minors in the 1990s and Graubner of failing to report charges of abuse to the police, transferring him instead to another parish. A civil court found Merta guilty and he received a suspended sentence of two years in prison. Graubner has said he reassigned Merta because the case against him was inconclusive.
