= Budkov (Třebíč District) =

- Municipality
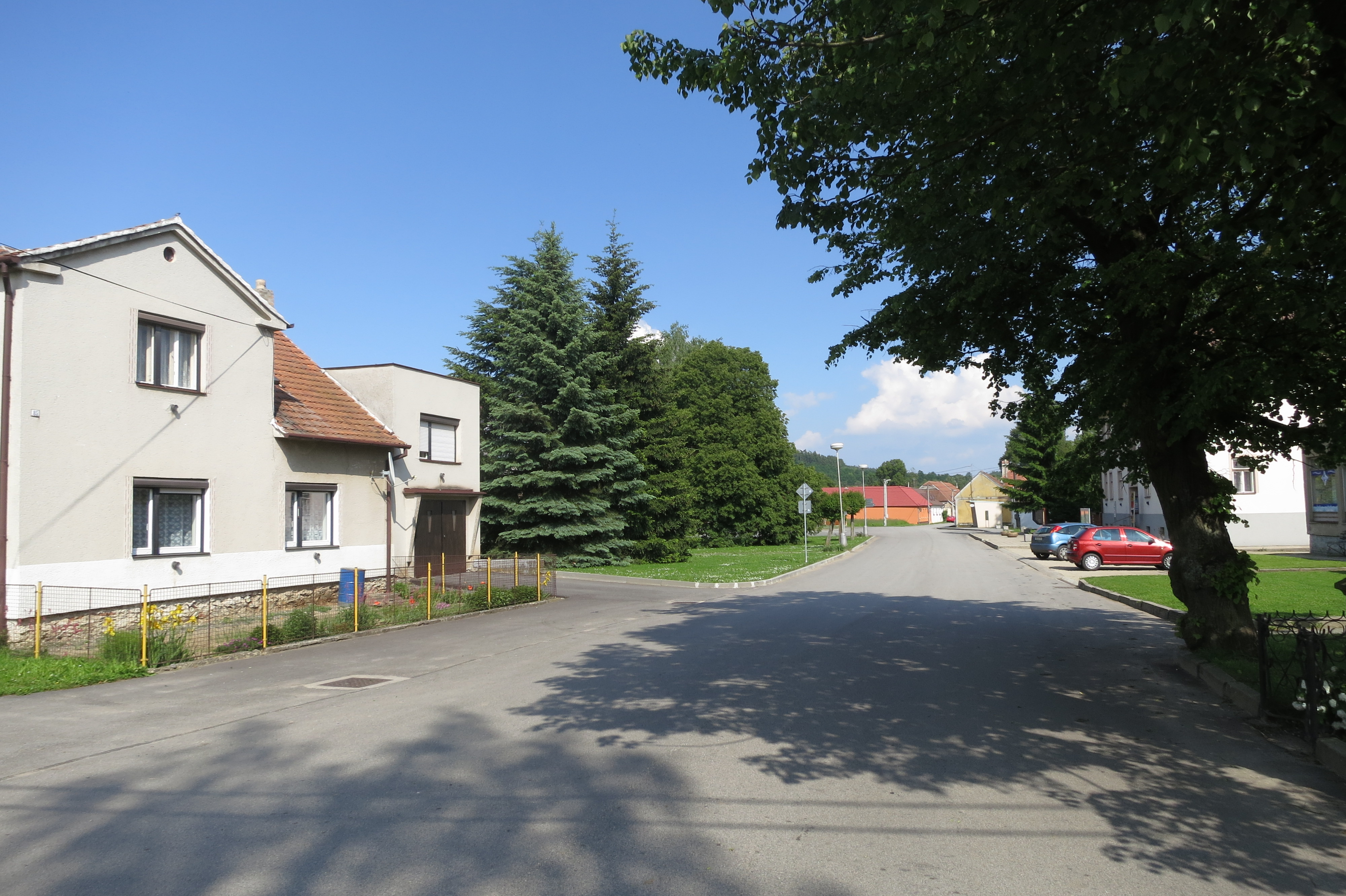
- Centre of Budkov

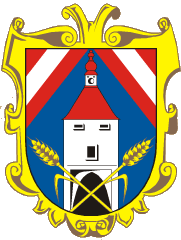
- Coat of arms

- Location in the Czech Republic
- Coordinates: 49°3′16″N 15°39′32″E
- Country: Czech Republic
- Region: Vysočina
- District: Třebíč
- First mentioned: 1353

Area
  - Total: 17.29 km^{2} (6.68 sq mi)
- Elevation: 503 m (1,650 ft)

Population (2026-01-01)
  - Total: 343
  - Density: 19.8/km^{2} (51.4/sq mi)
- Time zone: UTC+1 (CET)
  - Summer (DST): UTC+2 (CEST)
- Postal code: 675 42
- Website: www.budkov.cz

Budkov is a municipality and village in Třebíč District in the Vysočina Region of the Czech Republic. It has about 300 inhabitants.

Budkov lies approximately 24 kilometres (15 mi) south-west of Třebíč, 39 km (24 mi) south of Jihlava, and 147 km (91 mi) south-east of Prague.

== Demographics ==
Historical population
Year	Pop.	±%
1869	721	—
1880	777	+7.8%
1890	713	−8.2%
1900	670	−6.0%
1910	641	−4.3%
1921	661	+3.1%
1930	616	−6.8%
1950	594	−3.6%
1961	517	−13.0%
1970	557	+7.7%
1980	441	−20.8%
1991	398	−9.8%
2001	378	−5.0%
2011	378	+0.0%
2021	361	−4.5%
Source: Censuses

== Notable people ==
- Pavel Posád (born 1953), Roman Catholic bishop
