= List of cathedrals in Botswana =

This is the list of cathedrals in Botswana sorted by denomination.

== Catholic ==
Cathedrals of the Catholic Church in Botswana:

- Our Lady of the Desert Cathedral in Francistown
- Christ the King Cathedral in Gaborone

== Anglican ==
Cathedrals of the Church of the Province of Central Africa in Botswana:

- Cathedral of the Holy Cross in Gaborone

== See also ==
- List of cathedrals
- Christianity in Botswana
