= Ernest Poruthota =

Sri Lankan Catholic priest (1931–2020)

Rev. Fr. Ernest Poruthota අර්නස්ට් පෝරුතොට
- Archdiocese: Colombo
- Province: Colombo
- Other posts: Pisces Father; Pastor

Orders
- Ordination: 2 February 1957 by Most Rev. Thomas Cardinal Cooray
- Rank: Archbishop of Colombo

Personal details
- Born: Poruthotage Raymond Ernest Alexander Fernando; 31 August 1931 Marawila, Sri Lanka
- Died: 16 June 2020 (aged 88) Colombo
- Buried: St. Philip Mary Church, Katukurunda
- Denomination: Roman Catholic
- Residence: Sts. Peter & Paul Church, Lunawa, Moratuwa
- Parents: Poruthotage Jokinu Fernando (father); Mary Margaret Peiris (mother)
- Education: Marawila Roman Catholic School; St. Aloysius Junior Church, Borella; St. Bernard's Church, Borella

Poruthotage Raymond Ernest Alexander Fernando (Sinhala: පෝරුතොටගේ රේමන්ඩ් අර්නස්ට් ඇලෙක්සැන්ඩර් ප්‍රනාන්දු) (31 August 1931 — 16 June 2020), often known simply as Ernest Poruthota, was a Catholic priest. Popularly known as "Priest of the Sinhala Cinema", Poruthota rendered a yeoman service to Sri Lanka's cinema industry and was the founder of Sri Lanka OCIC organization.

== Early life and education ==
Poruthota was born on 31 August, 1931 in Marawila, Puttalam as the eldest of the family. His father Poruthotage Jokinu Fernando from Boralessa was a teacher at the Government Teachers’ College in Maggona before being transferred to Marawila. His father has also published several books such as Kayika Vidyawa, Saddharma Rathnavali Deepika, Sinhala Mosthara Nirmana and Iganweeme Mooladharma. He was also a painter. His mother Mary Margaret Peiris was from Seeduwa. Ernest has 3 younger sisters - Stella, Marilyn, Cristobal - and one younger brother, Earl.

He received his primary education at the Marawila Roman Catholic School and then went to Francis Xavier English School in the village. Then he attended St. Aloysius Junior Church in Borella and St. Bernard's Church in Borella in 1942. He was later inducted into the National Diocese of Our Lady of Ampitiya, Kandy. On 2 February 1957, he was ordained by the Most Reverend Thomas Cardinal Cooray at St. Lucia Cathedral, Kotahena.

From 1957 to 1959, he worked as a Pisces Father at St. Lucia Cathedral, Kotahena. Then he worked as a Pisces Father at St. Sebastian's College, Moratuwa from 1959 to 1960 and later at St. Joseph of Pamunugama in 1960 and finally at Dehiwala St Mary's Church from 1960 to 1962.

Rev. Fr. Poruthota then became the pastor of several parishes including Dehiyagatha (1962–66), Kelaniya (1967–74), Kalutara Kalmulla (1974–82), Kotte (1982–87), Wattala (1991–97) and Dehiwala (1997-2004).

He died on 16 June 2020 at the age of 88 while receiving treatment at a private hospital in Colombo. His body was kept at the Archbishop's House until 6:30 pm on Wednesday. His remains were then brought to St. Philip Mary Church, Katukurunda on 18 June 2020. The funeral took place at Roman Catholic Cemetery, Kalutara.

== Religious Services ==
The Second Vatican Council, founded by Pope John XXIII in Vatican City in 1962, issued 16 ordinances in 1965, following the 1963, '64 and '65-year conferences. Father Poruthota was involved in conducting pilgrimages of Sri Lanka in Sinhala language instead of Latin. Therefore, he played an important role in instilling this new revolution into the Sri Lankan Catholic Church as well as the lay people.

In 1963, he published the book Gihiya. It broadly commented on the Catholic lay, glory and power. Then he wrote the book Kithunu Peraliya, which analyzed in detail how the views of the Second Vatican discourse affect Sri Lanka. In 1958, while serving in the Kotahena Parish, he wrote the book Wurthiya samithi Viplawaya emphasizing the importance of the absence of trade union politics. In 1964, he wrote the social book Suraawa and then wrote Bhawyawadaya Saha Lankawa. The latter explained the impact of Jean-Paul Sartre's influence on the literature of the sixties. In 1965, Poruthota wrote two more books, Cardinal Cooray and Kri.Sha. Kramaya.

In 1970, Pope Paul VI visited Sri Lanka and the government asked Father Poruthota to write a book on Pope's visit. As a result, along with the Hon. Jayalath Balagalla, Poruthota launched 456-pages and 404-pages books with two-volumes titled Katholika Samaaja Dharshanaya. It is said that Father Poruthota was the first to bring Gokkola and wedding drums to the church in 1967 for a wedding reception which was held at the Bolawalana Church in Negombo. The Most Venerable Mapalagamagama Vipulasara Thero was a close friend of his, where Poruthota contributed to the Buddhism as well.

== Work on Cinema ==
Since the early stages, Poruthota had a keen interest in cinema. He left the National Cathedral in 1957 with a broad knowledge of cinema by referring to the English textbook on cinema. He also brought "Sarasaviya" and "Visithura" cinema papers every week. At the end of each year, he conserved them in his library using a thick wall. In 1965, he had published his book titled Chithrapati Gena. The Ceylon Film Critics and Writers Association was founded in 1967, with the guidance of Poruthota. He was also a member of the Arts Forum called Ape Kattiya.

In 1970, Father Poruthota pioneered the establishment of the Sri Lankan branch of International Catholic Film Organization (OCIC) when he was a Kelaniya staff member. OCIC's first meeting was held at St. Mary's Cathedral in Peliyagoda. He was appointed as the first National Director of the OCIC (later known as SIGNIS). Father Poruthota's objective was to establish a system of appreciating the talents of the artists representing the various sectors of local cinema which contributed to the development of good cinema. As a first step, a special ceremony was held to honor the Catholics who contributed to cinema from 1947 to 1972. The ceremony was held on 21 December 1971 with the participation of Cardinal Thomas Cooray, Archbishop of Colombo.

In 1973, Ceylon Film and Critics and Writers Association began awarding critical awards to local cinema. On April 3, 1975, The National Catholic Cinema Cluster, which utilized the same platform, was awarded the Dharmasena Pathiraja's Ahas Gauwa award. With the guidance of Father Poruthota, a jury of films for the 1976 screening of the National Film Cinema Cluster at the Sri Lanka Foundation Institute commenced on February 5, 1977, where Father Poruthota presided over this first jury.

Since 1981, Father Poruthota took the initiative to present the awards for Sri Lankan Tamil films and short and semi-narratives. Then, the OCIC award was given to the best performers of the film industry in the year 1985 and the Jayavilal Wilegoda Memorial Award was held from 1986 onwards. He released the book 26 Weni Chithrapati Waarshikaya about the films of the year 1973. This was followed by separate books for the period 1947-1951 and period 1978–1982. However, The Catholic Cinema Cluster stopped publishing books with the 34th-35th film anniversary. At the request of the Catholic Church by the Rev. Father Poruthota, the OCIC office was located on the sixth floor of Malwatta Road, Colombo which had a mini cinema and an office. He retired in 1982 after ten years of service at the Catholic Film Cluster.
