= Lists of cathedrals =

This is a list of cathedrals by country, including both actual cathedrals (seats of bishops in episcopal denominations, such as Catholicism, Anglicanism, and Orthodoxy) and a few prominent churches from non-episcopal denominations commonly referred to as "cathedral", usually having formerly acquired that status. As of December 2018, the Catholic Church had 3,391 cathedral-level churches; Cathedral (3,037), Co-cathedral (312), and Pro-cathedral (42) status around the world, predominantly in countries with a significant Roman Catholic population: Italy (368), Brazil (287), United States (215), India (183), France (110), Mexico (100), Spain (88), Philippines (88), Colombia (86), Canada (79) and Argentina (72).

== Africa ==
- List of cathedrals in Algeria
- List of cathedrals in Angola
- List of cathedrals in Benin
- List of cathedrals in Botswana
- List of cathedrals in Burkina Faso
- List of cathedrals in Burundi
- List of cathedrals in Cameroon
- List of cathedrals in Cape Verde
- List of cathedrals in the Central African Republic
- List of cathedrals in Chad
- List of cathedrals in the Democratic Republic of the Congo
- List of cathedrals in the Republic of the Congo
- List of cathedrals in Egypt
- List of cathedrals in Ghana
- List of cathedrals in Ivory Coast
- List of cathedrals in Liberia
- List of cathedrals in Madagascar
- List of cathedrals in Malawi
- List of cathedrals in Morocco
- List of cathedrals in Mozambique
- List of cathedrals in Nigeria
- List of cathedrals in Rwanda
- List of cathedrals in Senegal
- List of cathedrals in South Africa
- List of cathedrals in Tanzania
- List of cathedrals in Zambia
- List of cathedrals in Zimbabwe

== Americas ==
- List of cathedrals in Antigua and Barbuda
- List of cathedrals in Argentina
- List of cathedrals in the Bahamas
- List of cathedrals in Barbados
- List of cathedrals in Belize
- List of cathedrals in Bermuda
- List of cathedrals in Bolivia
- List of cathedrals in Brazil
- List of cathedrals in Canada
- List of cathedrals in Chile
- List of cathedrals in Colombia
- List of cathedrals in Costa Rica
- List of cathedrals in Cuba
- List of cathedrals in Dominica
- List of cathedrals in the Dominican Republic
- List of cathedrals in Ecuador
- List of cathedrals in El Salvador
- List of cathedrals in Guatemala
- List of cathedrals in Haiti
- List of cathedrals in Honduras
- List of cathedrals in Mexico
- List of cathedrals in Nicaragua
- List of cathedrals in Panama
- List of cathedrals in Paraguay
- List of cathedrals in Peru
- List of cathedrals in the United States
- List of cathedrals in Uruguay
- List of cathedrals in Venezuela

== Asia ==
- List of cathedrals in Armenia
- List of cathedrals in Azerbaijan
- List of cathedrals in Bangladesh
- List of cathedrals in Cambodia
- List of cathedrals in China
- List of cathedrals in East Timor
- List of cathedrals in Hong Kong
- List of cathedrals in India
- List of cathedrals in Indonesia
- List of cathedrals in Iraq
- List of cathedrals in Israel
- List of cathedrals in Japan
- List of cathedrals in Kazakhstan
- List of cathedrals in Lebanon
- Cathedrals in Macau
- List of cathedrals in Malaysia
- List of cathedrals in Myanmar
- Cathedrals in North Korea
- List of cathedrals in Palestine
- List of cathedrals in Pakistan
- List of cathedrals in the Philippines
- List of cathedrals in Singapore
- List of cathedrals in South Korea
- List of cathedrals in Sri Lanka
- List of cathedrals in Syria
- List of cathedrals in Taiwan
- List of cathedrals in Thailand
- List of cathedrals in Turkey
- List of cathedrals in Vietnam

== Europe ==
- List of cathedrals in Albania
- List of cathedrals in Austria
- List of cathedrals in Belarus
- List of cathedrals in Belgium
- List of cathedrals in Bosnia and Herzegovina
- List of cathedrals in Bulgaria
- List of cathedrals in Croatia
- List of cathedrals in the Czech Republic
- List of cathedrals in Denmark
- List of cathedrals in Estonia
- List of cathedrals in Finland
- List of cathedrals in France
- List of cathedrals in Germany
- List of cathedrals in Greece
- List of cathedrals in Hungary
- List of cathedrals in Iceland
- List of cathedrals in Ireland
- List of cathedrals in Italy
- List of cathedrals in Latvia
- List of cathedrals in Lithuania
- List of cathedrals in Malta
- List of cathedrals in Montenegro
- List of cathedrals in the Netherlands
- List of cathedrals in Norway
- List of cathedrals in Poland
- List of cathedrals in Portugal
- List of cathedrals in Romania
- List of cathedrals in Russia
- List of cathedrals in Serbia
- List of cathedrals in Slovakia
- List of cathedrals in Slovenia
- List of cathedrals in Spain
- List of cathedrals in Sweden
- List of cathedrals in Switzerland
- List of cathedrals in Turkey
- List of cathedrals in Ukraine
- List of cathedrals in the United Kingdom
  - List of cathedrals in England
  - List of cathedrals in Scotland
  - List of cathedrals in Wales
  - List of former cathedrals in Great Britain
  - List of cathedrals in British Overseas Territories

== Oceania ==
- List of cathedrals in Australia
- List of cathedrals in New Zealand
- List of cathedrals in Papua New Guinea
- List of cathedrals in Solomon Islands

== See also ==
- Church (building)
- Co-cathedral
- Duomo
- Minster (church)
- Pro-cathedral
- List of largest church buildings
- List of tallest church buildings
- List of Catholic basilicas
- Lists of buildings and structures
