= List of cathedrals in Denmark =

This is the list of cathedrals in Denmark sorted by denomination.

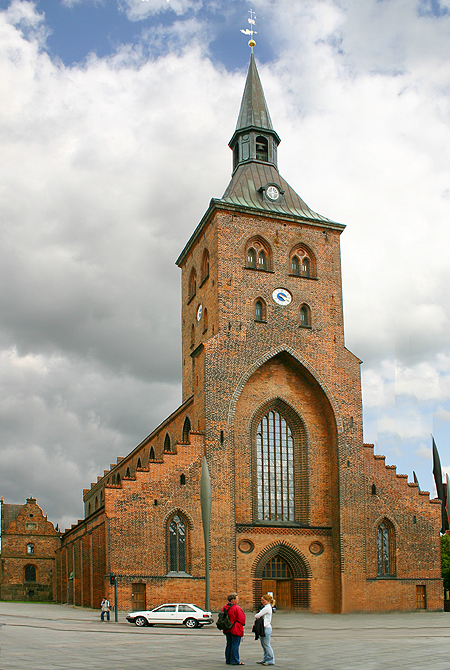
St. Canute's Cathedral in Odense.

== Lutheran ==
Cathedrals of the Danish National Church:

- St. Budolfi Cathedral in Aalborg
- Aarhus Cathedral in Århus
- Cathedral of Our Lady in Copenhagen
- Haderslev Cathedral in Haderslev
- Maribo Cathedral in Maribo
- St. Canute's Cathedral in Odense
- Cathedral of Our Lady Mary in Ribe
- Roskilde Cathedral in Roskilde
- Our Lady Cathedral in Viborg
- Saint Olaf's Cathedral in Helsingør
- Cathedral of Our Saviour in Nuuk, Greenland

== Catholic ==
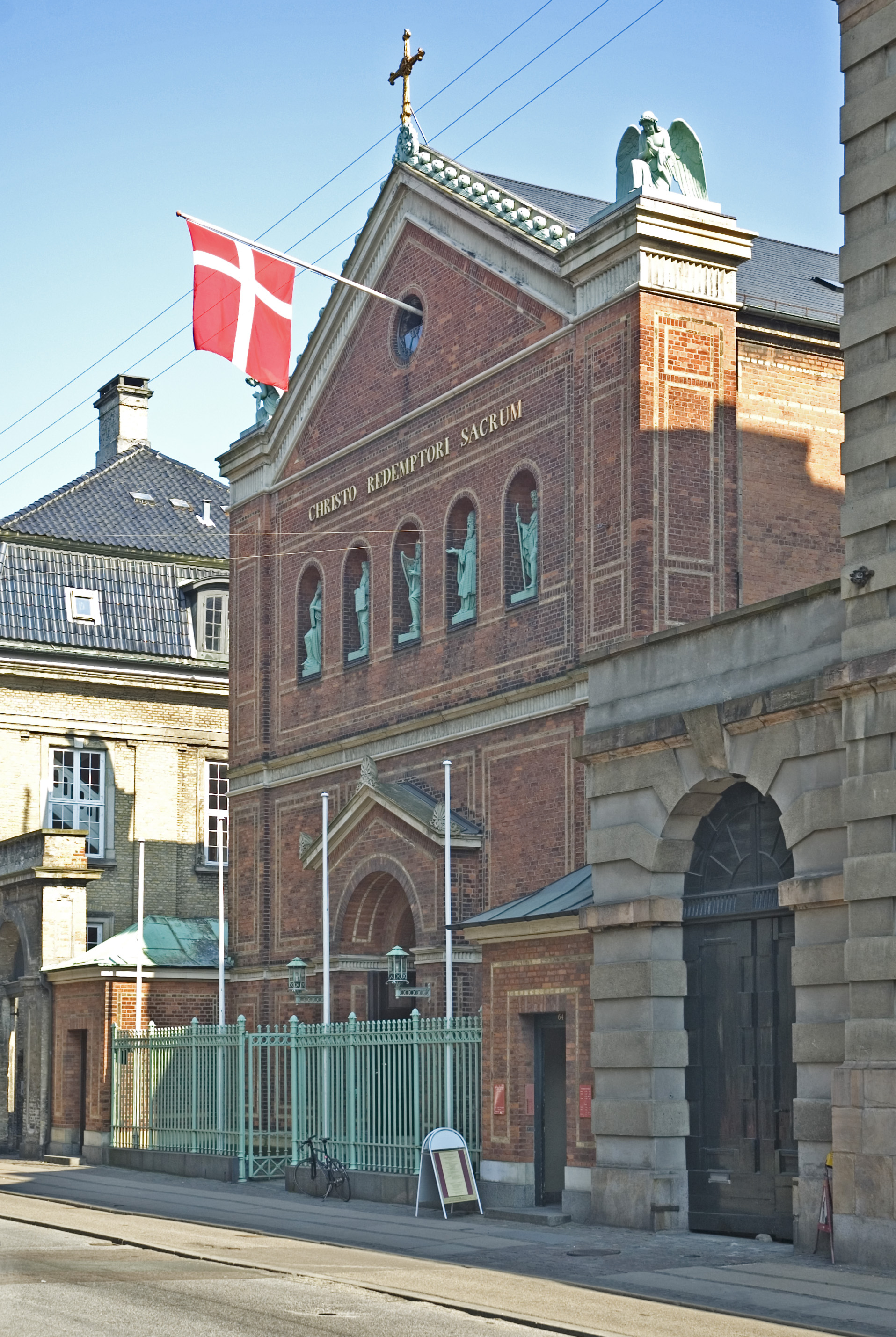
St. Ansgar's Cathedral

Cathedrals of the Catholic Church in Denmark:

- St. Ansgar's Cathedral in Copenhagen

== See also ==
- List of cathedrals
- Christianity in Denmark
