= List of cathedrals in Rwanda =

This is the list of cathedrals in Rwanda sorted by denomination.

== Catholic ==
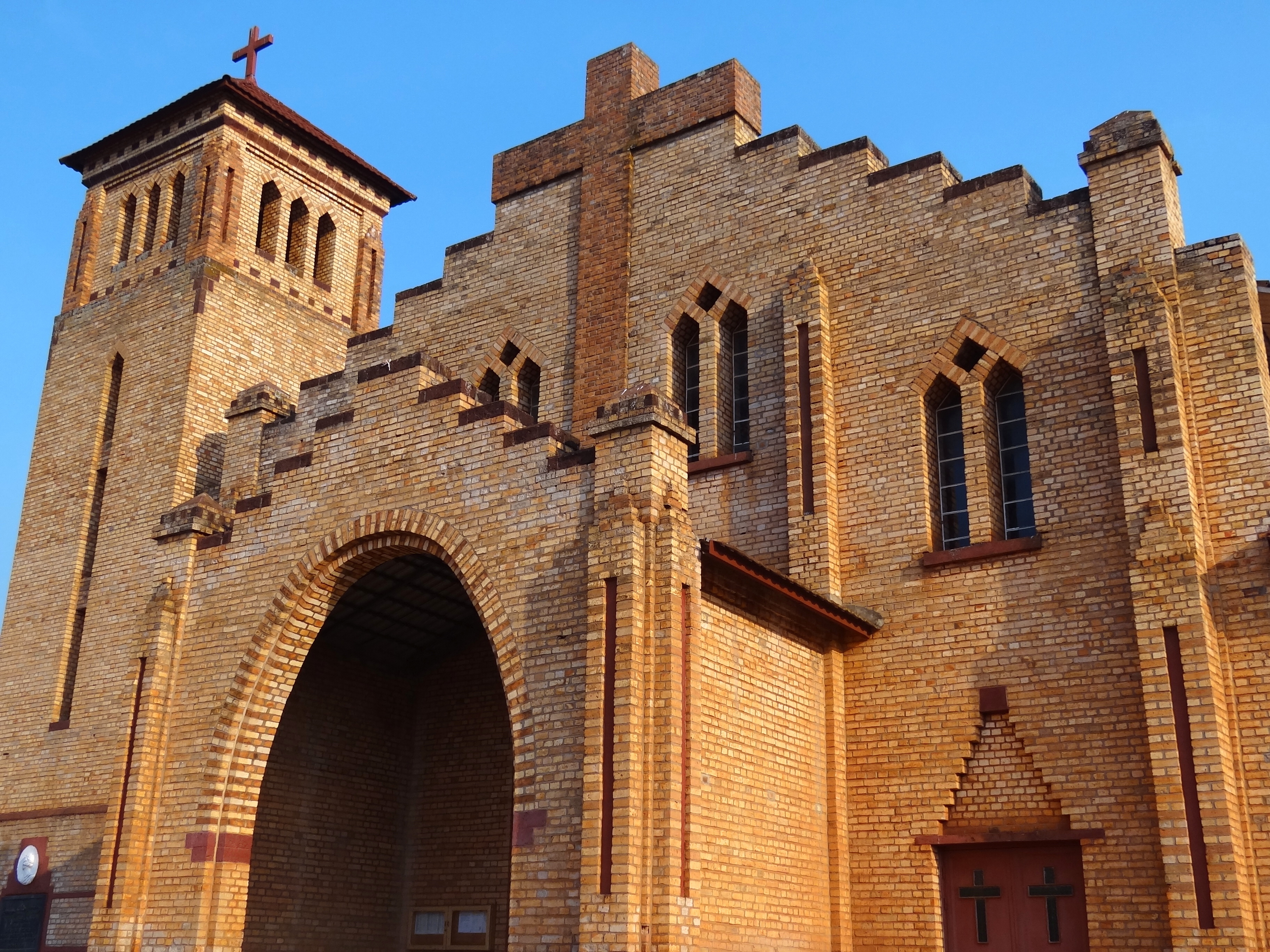
Facade of Catholic Cathedral - Huye (Butare) - Rwanda - 01 (9009757636)

Cathedrals of the Catholic Church in Rwanda:

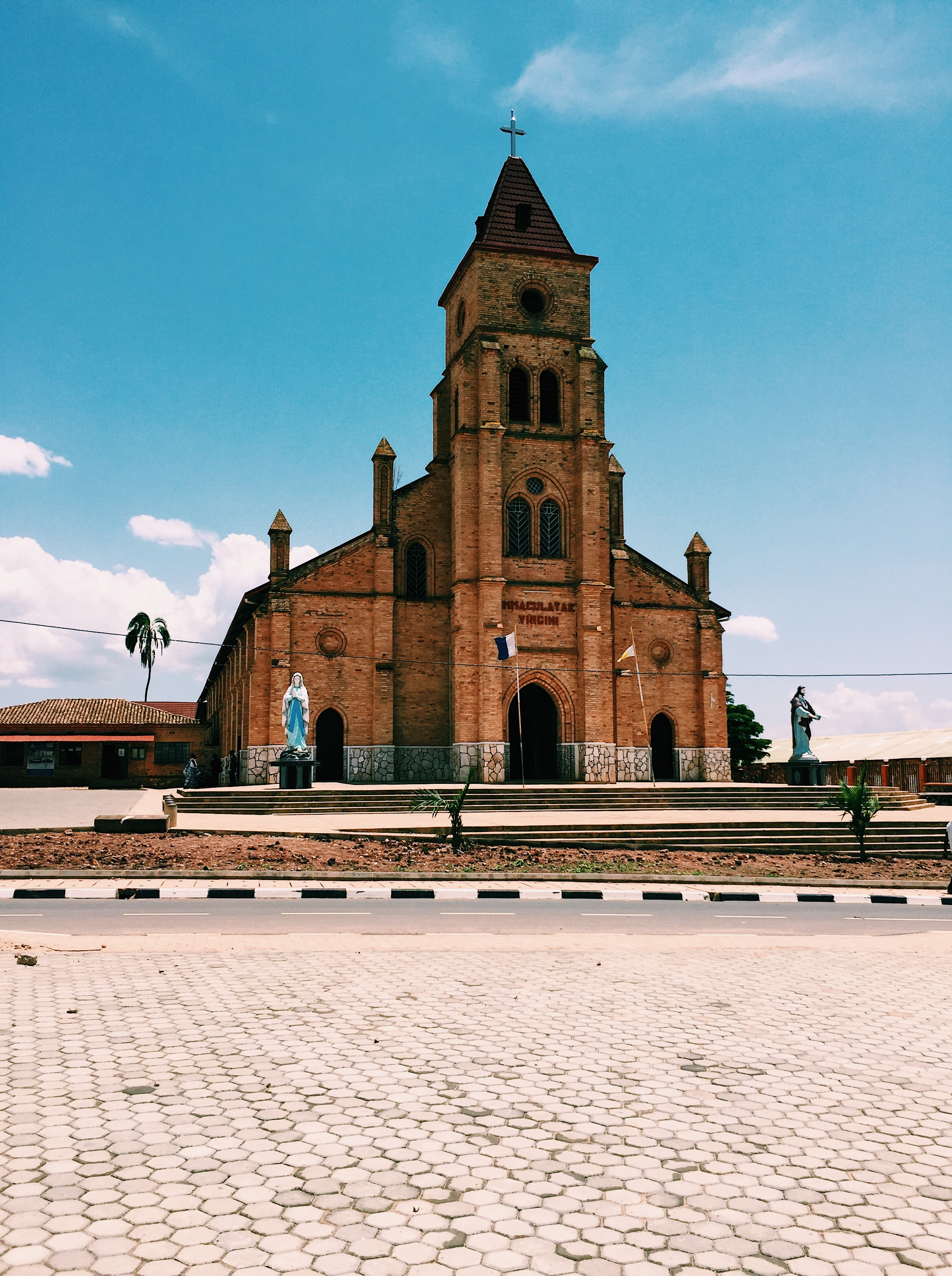
- The Catholic Cathedral in Kabgayi
  Cathedral of Butare
- Cathedral of Byumba
- Cathedral of Christ the King in Cyangugu
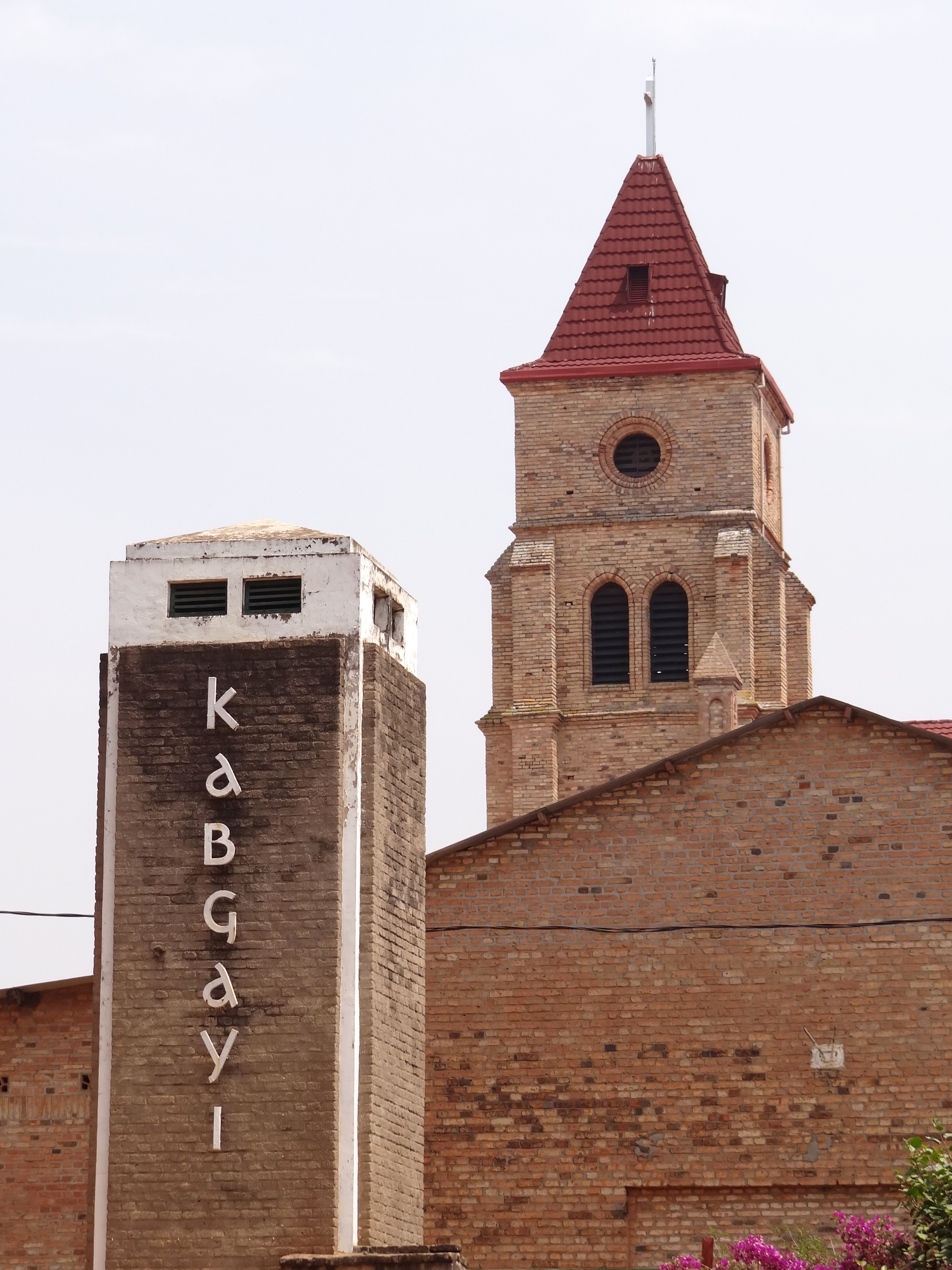
- Cathedral Basilica of Our Lady at Kabgayi - Genocide Site - Outside Muhanga-Gitarama - Rwanda
  Cathedral of Gikongoro
- Cathedral Basilica of Our Lady in Kabgayi
- Cathedral of St. Peter in Kibungo
- Cathedral of St. Michael in Kigali
- Cathedral of Nyundo
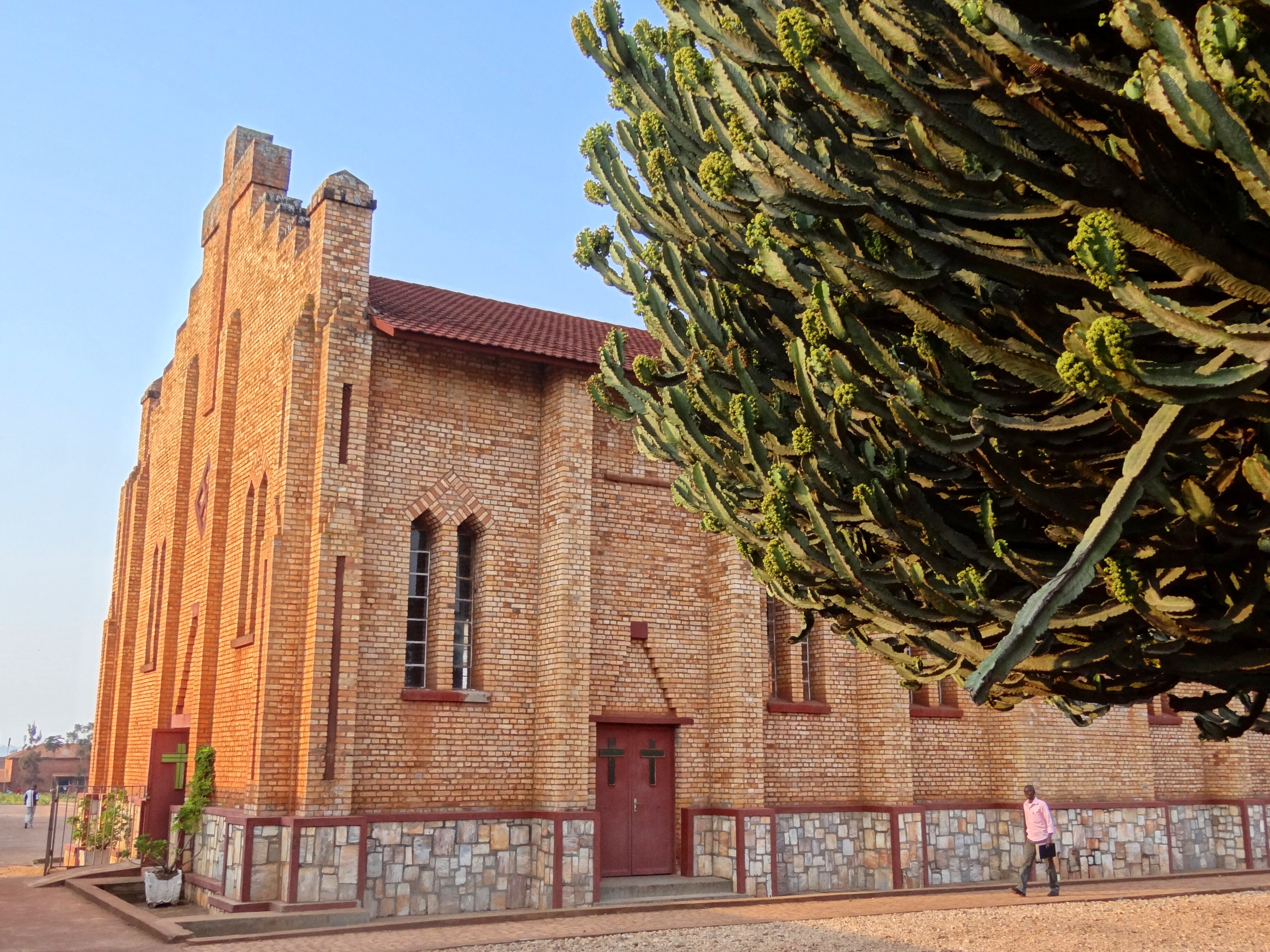
  Facade of Catholic Cathedral - Huye (Butare) - Rwanda - 06 (9008484665)
- Cathedral of Ruhengeri

== Anglican ==
Cathedrals of the Anglican Church of Rwanda:

- Christ the King cathedral in Cyangugu
- St Etienne Cathedral, Kigali
- St Paul Cathedral, Butare
- St John The Baptist Cathedral, Shyira
- St peter Cathedral, Shyogwe
- St John Cathedral, Gahini
- Kibungo Cathedral, Ngoma
- Kivu Cathedral, Rubavu
- St Paul Cathedral, Byumba
- Kigeme Cathedral, Nyamagabe
- Holy trinity Cathedral, Gasabo
- Karongi cathedral, Karongi

== See also ==
- List of cathedrals
