= List of cathedrals in Thailand =

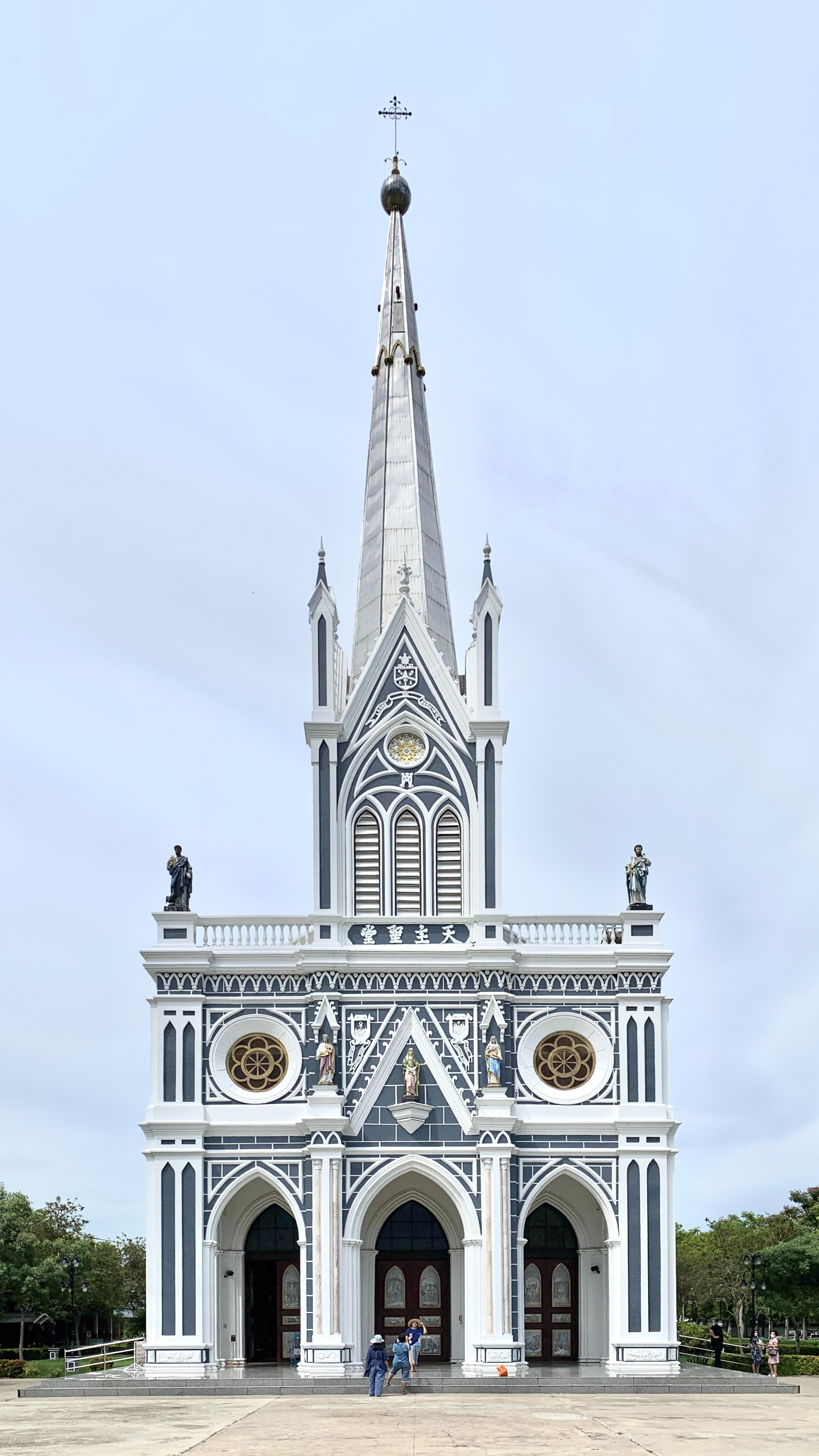
Nativity of Our Lady Cathedral in Amphoe Bang Khonthi.

This is the list of cathedrals in Thailand.

== Catholic ==
Cathedrals of the Catholic Church in Thailand:

- Cathedral of the Assumption of the Blessed Virgin Mary in Bangkok
- Cathedral of the Immaculate Conception in Chanthaburi
- Sacred Heart Cathedral in Chiang Mai
- Our Lady of Lourdes Cathedral in Nakhon Ratchasima
- St. Anna Cathedral in Nakhon Sawan
- Nativity of Our Lady Cathedral in Amphoe Bang Khonthi
- St. Raphael Cathedral in Surat Thani
- St. Michael the Archangel Cathedral in Tha Rae
- St. Anne's Co-Cathedral in Nakhon Phanom
- Immaculate Conception Cathedral in Ubon Ratchathani
- Cathedral of Our Mother of Perpetual Help in Udon Thani

== See also ==
- List of cathedrals
- Christianity in Thailand
