= List of cathedrals in the Republic of the Congo =

This is the list of cathedrals in the Republic of the Congo sorted by denomination.

== Catholic ==
Cathedrals of the Catholic Church in the Republic of the Congo:

- Cathedral of the Sacred Heart in Brazzaville
- Cathédrale Notre-Dame in Impfondo
- Cathedral of St. Louis in Nkayi
- Cathedral of St. Peter Claver in Ouesso
- Cathédrale Saint-Firmin in Owando
- Cathedral of St. Peter the Apostle in Pointe-Noire

== See also ==
- List of cathedrals
- Religion in the Republic of the Congo
