= List of cathedrals in Benin =

This is the list of cathedrals in Benin.

== Catholic ==
Cathedrals of the Catholic Church in Benin:

- Cathedral of Sts. Peter and Paul in Abomey
- Cathedral of Our Lady in Cotonou
- Cathédrale Notre-Dame de Fourvière in Dassa-Zoumé
- Cathedral of the Sacred Heart in Djougou
- Cathedral of Our Lady of Mount Carmel in Kandi
- Cathedral of St. Peter Claver in Lokossa
- Cathedral of St. Mark the Evangelist in N'Dali
- Cathedral of the Immaculate Conception in Natitingou
- Cathedral of Sts. Peter and Paul in Parakou
- Cathedral of the Immaculate Conception in Porto Novo

== See also ==
- List of cathedrals
- Christianity in Benin
