= List of cathedrals in Lebanon =

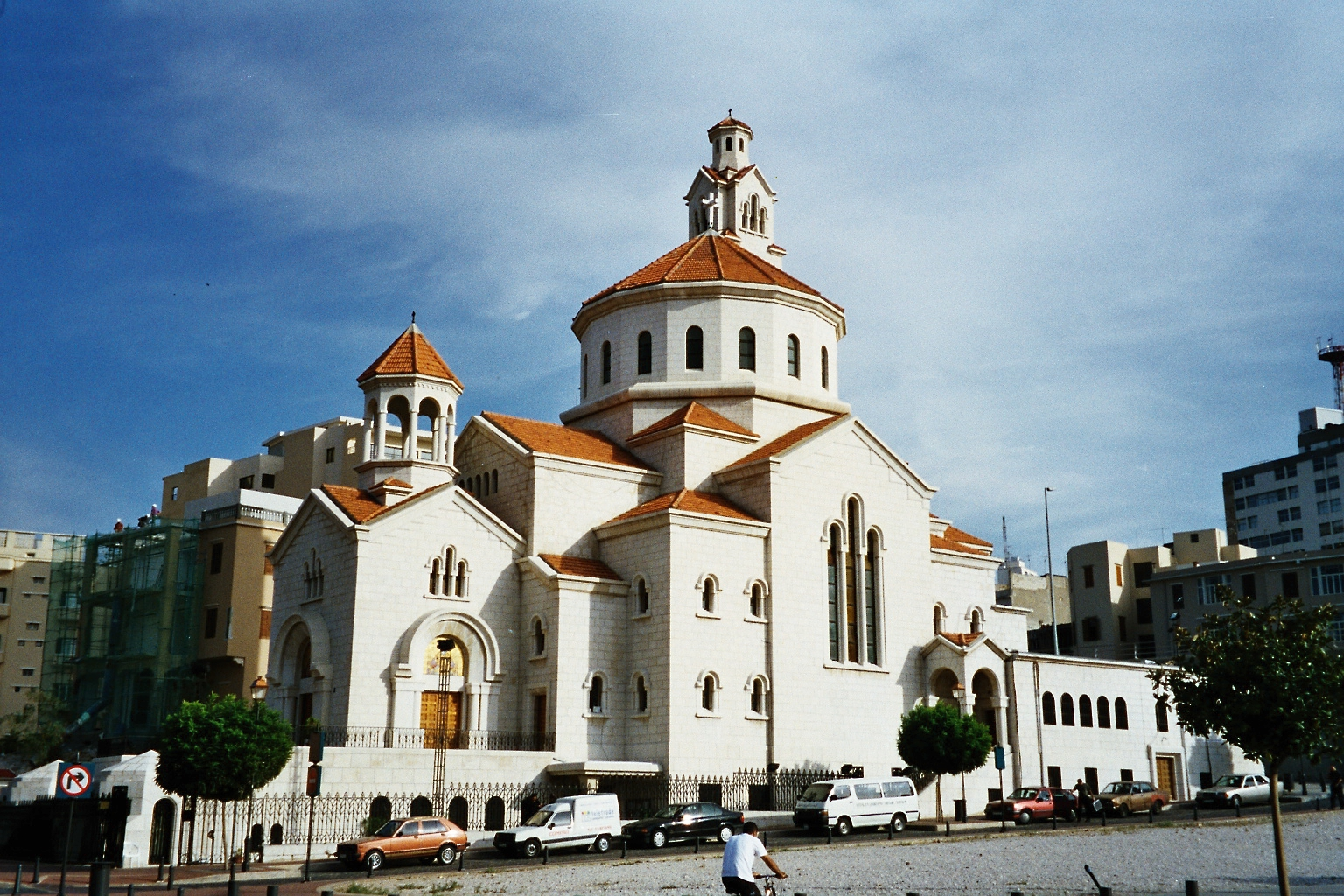
Cathedral of Saint Elie and Saint Gregory the Illuminator in Beirut (Armenian Catholic Church)

This is the list of cathedrals in Lebanon sorted by denomination.

== Catholic Church ==
Cathedrals of the Catholic Church in Lebanon:

- Maronite Church
  - Patriarchal Seat in Bkerké
  - Cathedral of St. Georges in Ehden
  - Church of Our Lady of Zgharta in Zgharta
  - Cathedral of St. Stephen in Batroun
  - Saint George's Cathedral in Beirut
  - Cathedral of St. Maroun in Zgharta
  - Cathedral of St. John Mark in Byblos
  - Cathedral of St. Elijah in Sidon
  - St. Michael Cathedral in Tripoli
  - Maronite Cathedral in Tyre
- Melkite Greek Catholic Church
  - St. Barbara Cathedral in Baalbek
  - Cathedral of St. Elias Beirut
  - Cathedral of St. Nicholas in Sidon
  - Cathedral of Our Lady of Deliverance in Zahleh
- Syriac Catholic Church
  - Cathedral of Our Lady of Annunciation in Beirut
- Armenian Catholic Church
  - St. Elie-St. Gregory the Illuminator Patriarchal Cathedral in Beirut
- Latin Church
  - Cathedral of St. Louis in Beirut
- Chaldean Catholic Church
  - Cathedral of St. Raphael - Baabda, Mount Lebanon

== Oriental Orthodox Church ==
Armenian Apostolic cathedrals in Lebanon:

- Saint Gregory the Illuminator Cathedral in Antelias (Holy See of Cilicia)
- Sourp Nshan Cathedral, Beirut

Syriac Orthodox Church cathedrals in Lebanon:

- St. Peter & St. Paul Cathedral, in Beirut
- St. Jacob of Serugh Cathedral, in Jdeideh, Mount Lebano
- St. George's Syrian Orthodox Cathedral, Zahlé

== Eastern Orthodox Church ==
Eastern Orthodox Church cathedrals in Lebanon:

- Saint George Cathedral in Beirut (Greek Orthodox Church of Antioch)
- Saint Nicolas Cathedral in Achrafieh, Beirut.
- Saint Dimitrios Cathedral in Achrafieh, Beirut.
- Saint Nicolas Cathedral in Ballouneh, Mount Lebanon.
- Saint Georgios Cathedral in Jdeideh, Mount Lebanon.
- Saint Georgios Cathedral in Bsalim, Mount Lebanon.
- Saint George Cathedral in Tripoli (Greek Orthodox Church of Antioch)
- Saint Georgios Cathedral in Mina, Tripoli.
- the Resurrection Cathedral in Kfaraaka, Koura.
- Saint Nicholas Cathedral in Zahlé (Greek Orthodox Church of Antioch)
- Saint Nicolas Cathedral in Sidon, the south of Lebanon.

== See also ==
- List of cathedrals
- Christianity in Lebanon
