= List of cathedrals in Papua New Guinea =

This is the list of cathedrals in Papua New Guinea sorted by denomination.

== Catholic ==
The following cathedrals of the Catholic Church in Papua New Guinea (all of which are of the Latin Rite) are located in Papua New Guinea:

- St. Ignatius Cathedral in Aitape
- Cathedral of the Sacred Heart of Jesus in Alotau
- Our Lady of the Sacred Heart Cathedral in Bereina
- Our Lady of the Assumption Cathedral in Hahela
- St. Gerard’s Cathedral in Kiunga
- St. Louis de Montfort Co-Cathedral in Daru
- Mary Help of Christians Cathedral in Kefamo near Goroka
- Our Lady of the Sacred Heart Cathedral in Kavieng
- Holy Spirit Cathedral in Kerema
- Mary Help of Christians Cathedral in Kimbe
- Mary Help of Christians Cathedral in Kundiawa
- St Mary’s Cathedral in Lae
- Holy Spirit Cathedral in Madang
- Mother of the Divine Shepherd Cathedral in Mendi
- Holy Trinity Cathedral in Mount Hagen
- St Mary's Cathedral in Port Moresby
- Sacred Heart Cathedral in Kokopo
- St Francis Xavier’s Co-Cathedral in Rabaul
- Good Shepherd Cathedral in Sangurap near Wabag
- Christ the King Cathedral in Wewak

== Anglican ==
The following cathedrals of the Anglican Church of Papua New Guinea are located in Papua New Guinea:

- St John's Cathedral in Port Moresby
- Resurrection Cathedral in Popondetta
- Ss Peter and Paul Cathedral in Dogura, Milne Bay Province

== See also ==
- List of cathedrals
