= List of cathedrals in the Central African Republic =

This is the list of cathedrals in the Central African Republic.

== Catholic ==
Cathedrals of the Catholic Church in the Central African Republic:

- Cathedral of the Sacred Heart in Alindao
- Cathedral of St. Joseph in Bambari
- Cathedral of St. Peter Claver in Bangassou
- Cathedral of Our Lady of the Immaculate Conception in Bangui
- Cathedral in Berbérati
- Cathedral of St. Anthony of Padua in Bossangoa
- Cathédrale Saint Joseph in Bouar
- Cathedral of St. Therese of the Child Jesus in Kaga-Bandoro
- Cathedral of St. Joan of Arc in Mbaïki

== See also ==
- List of cathedrals
- Baptist Churches of the Central African Republic
