= List of cathedrals in South Korea =

This is the list of cathedrals in South Korea sorted by denomination.

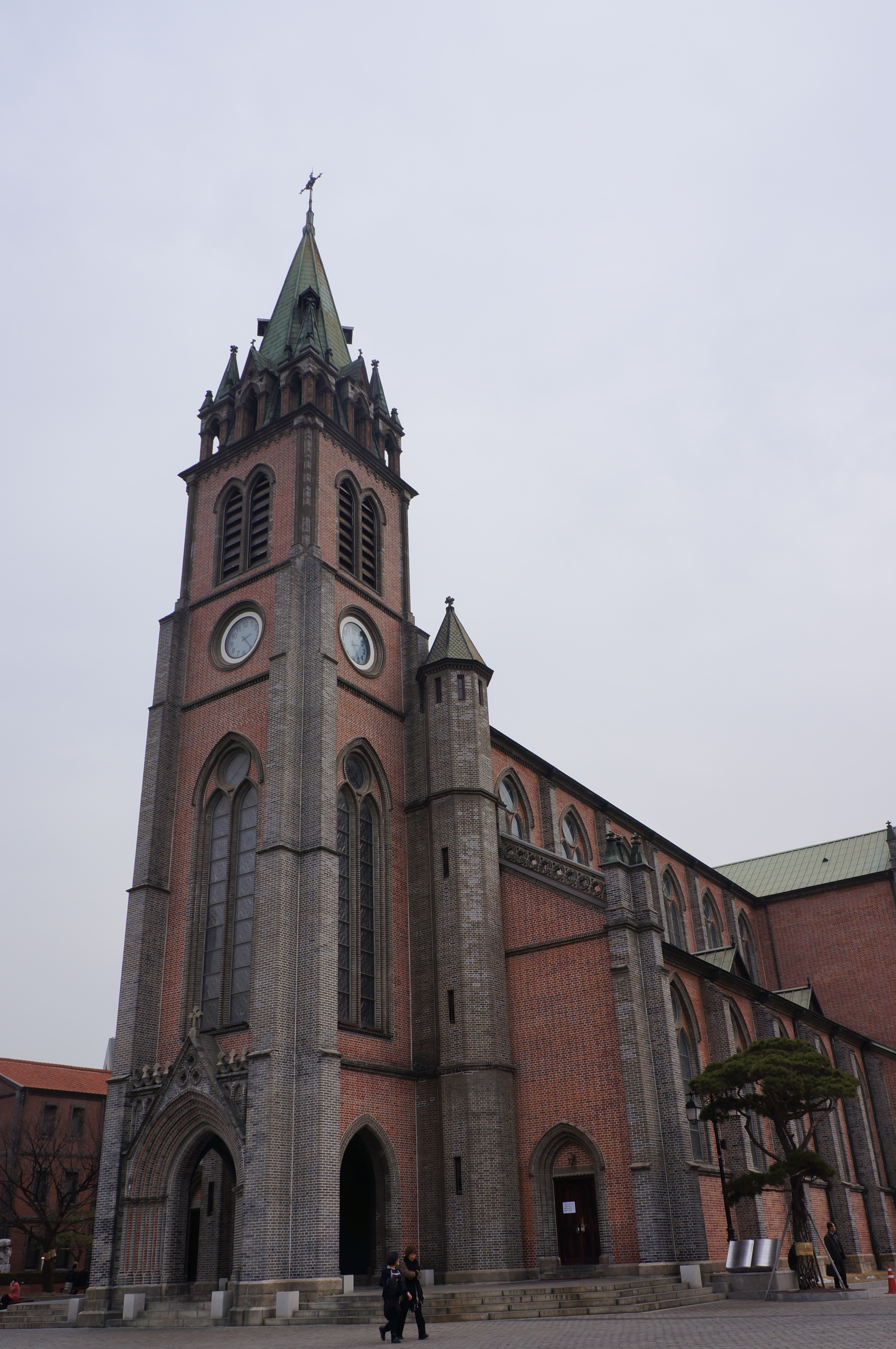
Myeongdong Cathedral in Seoul

== Catholic ==
Cathedrals of the Catholic Church in South Korea:

- Mokseong-dong Cathedral in Andong
- Naedeokdong Cathedral in Cheongju
- Chuncheon Juklim-dong Cathedral in Chuncheon
- Kyesan Cathedral and Beomeo Cathedral in Daegu
- Daeheungdong Cathedral in Daejeon
- Dapdong Cathedral in Inchon
- Joong-Ang Cathedral in Jeju City
- Jeondong Cathedral in Jeonju
- Im-dong Cathedral in Kwangju
- Yangdeokdong Cathedral in Masan
- Namcheon Cathedral in Pusan
- Cathedral of Virgin Mary of the Immaculate Conception (Myeong-dong Cathedral) in Seoul
- Jeongjadong Cathedral and Jowondong Cathedral in Suwon
- Cathedral of the Sacred Heart of Mary in Uijongbu
- Wondong Cathedral in Wonju

== Eastern Orthodox ==
Eastern Orthodox cathedral in South Korea:

- St. Nicholas Cathedral in Seoul

== Anglican ==
Cathedrals of the Anglican Church of Korea:

- Our Savior's Cathedral in Busan
- Sts. Mary and Nicholas's Cathedral (Seoul Anglican Cathedral) in Seoul
- St. Benedict's Anglican Cathedral in Daejeon

== See also ==
- List of cathedrals
- Christianity in Korea
