= List of cathedrals in Malaysia =

This is the list of cathedrals in Malaysia sorted by denomination.

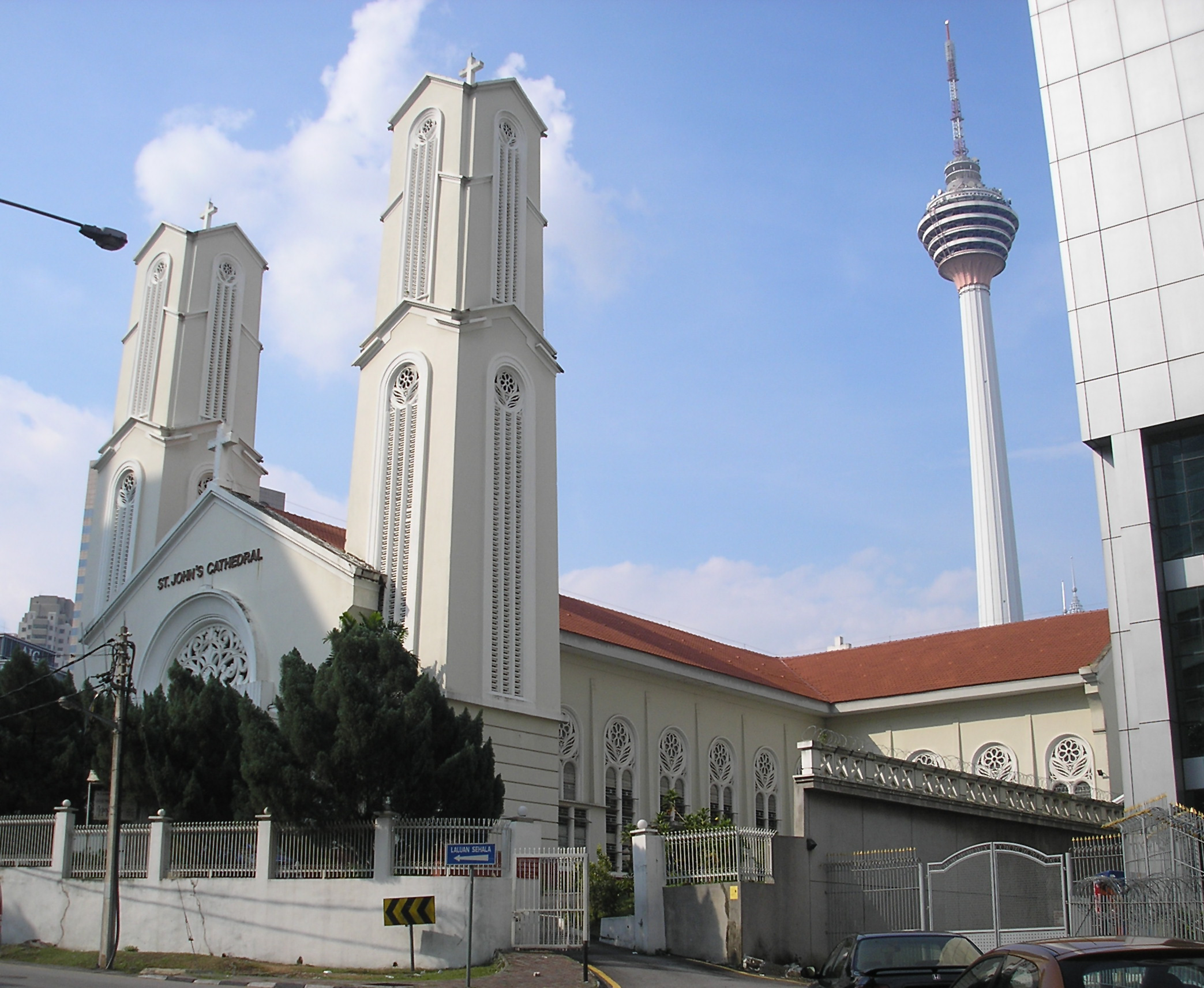
St. John's Cathedral in Kuala Lumpur.

== Catholic ==
Cathedrals of the Catholic Church in Malaysia:

=== Ecclesiastical Province of Kuala Lumpur ===
- St.John's Cathedral in Kuala Lumpur
- Holy Spirit Cathedral in George Town
- Cathedral of the Sacred Heart of Jesus in Johor Bahru

=== Ecclesiastical Province of Kota Kinabalu ===
- Sacred Heart Cathedral in Kota Kinabalu
- St. Mary's Cathedral in Sandakan
- Cathedral of St. Francis Xavier in Keningau

=== Ecclesiastical Province of Kuching ===
- St. Joseph's Cathedral in Kuching
- Cathedral of St. Joseph in Miri
- Sacred Heart Cathedral in Sibu

== Anglican ==
Cathedrals of the Church of the Province of South East Asia:

=== Diocese of Kuching ===
- St. Thomas's Cathedral in Kuching

=== Diocese of Sabah ===
- Cathedral of All Saints in Kota Kinabalu

=== Diocese of West Malaysia ===
- Cathedral of St. Mary the Virgin in Kuala Lumpur

== Lutheran ==
Cathedral of the Evangelical Lutheran Church in Malaysia:

- Cathedral of Zion in Kuala Lumpur

== Oriental Orthodox ==
Cathedral of the Malankara Orthodox Syrian Church in Malaysia

- Cathedral of St. Mary the Theotokos in Kuala Lumpur

== See also ==
- List of cathedrals
- Christianity in Malaysia
