= List of cathedrals in Antigua and Barbuda =

This is the list of cathedrals in Antigua and Barbuda, sorted by denomination.

== Anglican ==
- St. John's Cathedral, St. John's (Church in the province of the West Indies)

== Catholic ==
Cathedrals of the Catholic Church in Antigua and Barbuda:

- Cathedral of the Holy Family, St. John's

== See also ==
- List of cathedrals
- Religion in Antigua and Barbuda
- Roman Catholicism in Antigua and Barbuda
