= List of cathedrals in Belize =

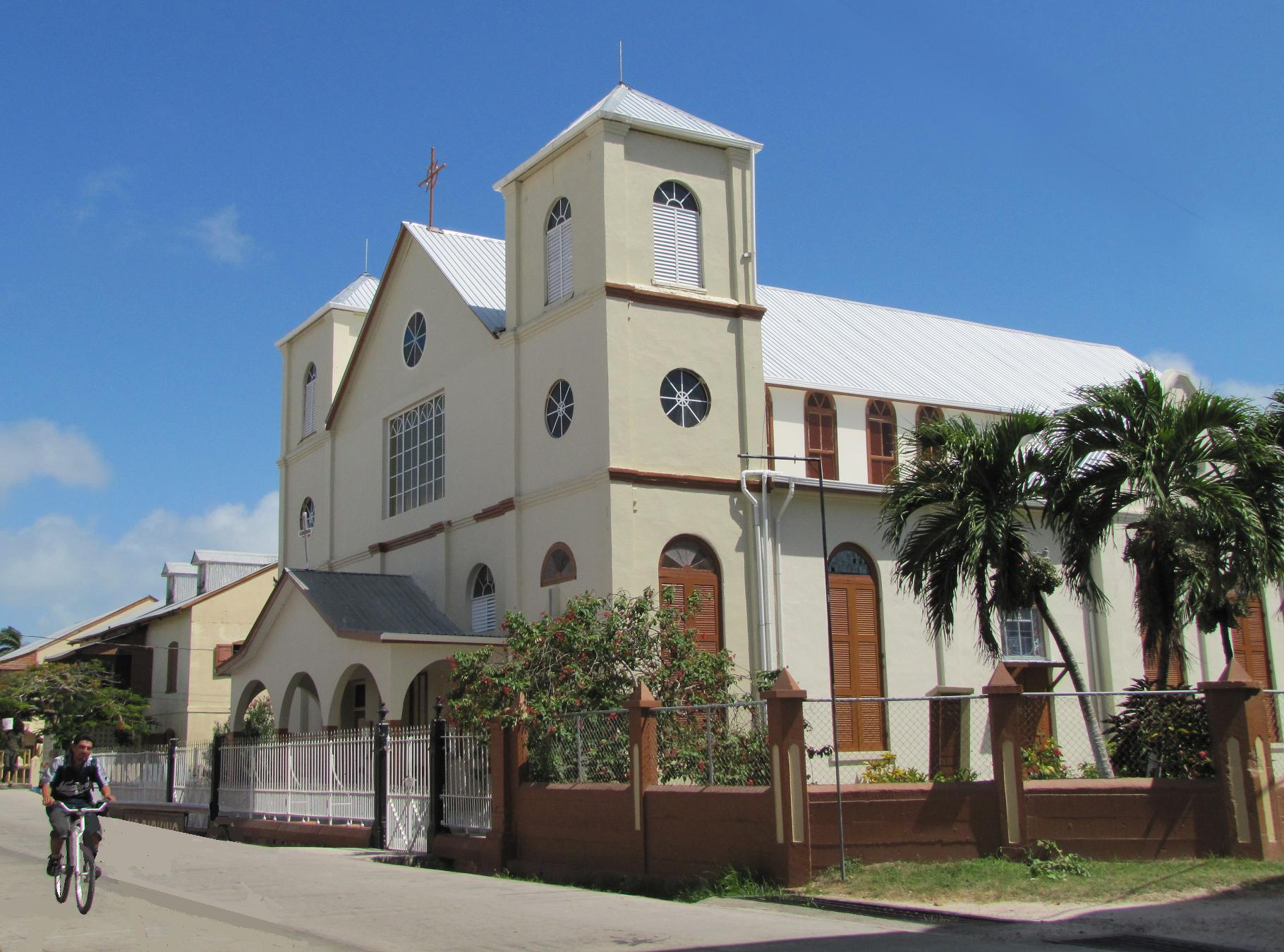
Holy Redeemer Cathedral, Belize City

This is the list of cathedrals in Belize sorted by denomination.

== Anglican ==
- St. John's Cathedral, Belize City (Church in the Province of the West Indies)

== Catholic ==
Cathedrals of the Catholic Church in Belize:

- Holy Redeemer Cathedral, Belize City
- Our Lady of Guadalupe Co-Cathedral, Belmopan

== See also ==
- List of cathedrals
