= List of cathedrals in Turkey =

There are 1388 registered churches in Turkey. The city with the most churches in Turkey is Istanbul, with 158 churches. Istanbul is followed by Nevşehir with 92 churches, Gümüşhane with 78 churches and Mardin with 69 churches.

This is the list of cathedrals in Turkey sorted by denomination.

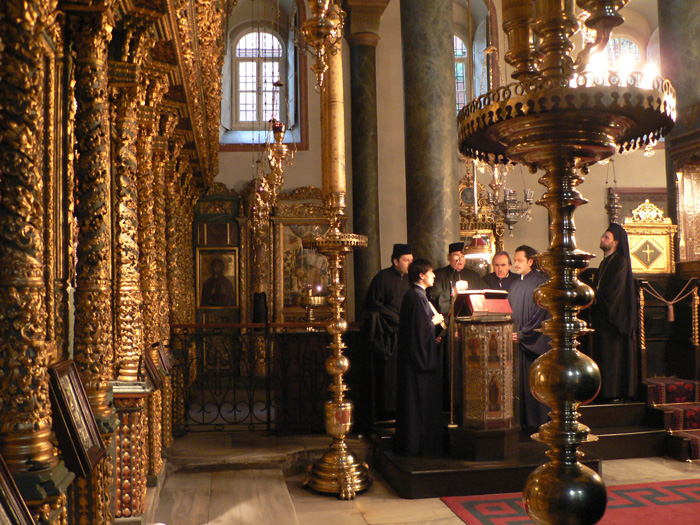
Greek Orthodox cathedral of St. George

== Eastern Orthodox ==
- St. George's Cathedral, Istanbul (Ecumenical Patriarchate of Constantinople)

== Oriental Orthodox ==
- Surp Asdvadzadzin Patriarchal Church (Holy Mother of God Patriarchal Church),

Istanbul (Armenian Patriarchate of Constantinople)

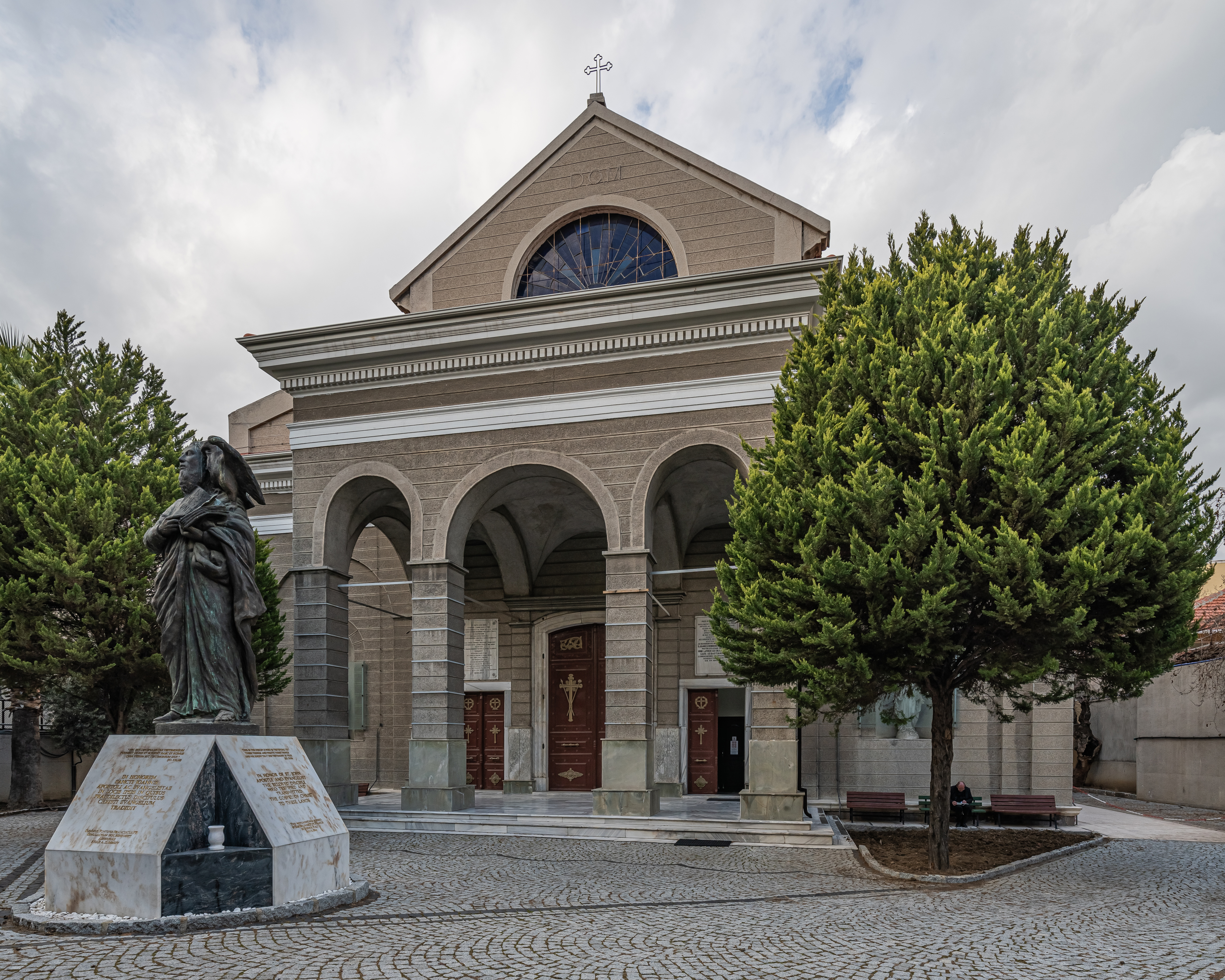
St. John's Cathedral in İzmir

== Catholic ==
Cathedrals of the Catholic Church in Turkey:

- Latin Rite
  - Cathedral of the Annunciation, İskenderun (Latin Rite)
  - Cathedral of the Holy Spirit, Istanbul (Latin Rite)
  - St. John's Cathedral, İzmir (Latin Rite)
  - Co-Cathedral of St. Anthony of Padua, Mersin (Latin Rite)
- Armenian Catholic
  - St. Mary of Sakızağaç Cathedral, Istanbul
- Greek Byzantine Catholic Church
  - Holy Trinity Greek Catholic Cathedral, Istanbul
- Chaldean Catholic
  - St. Mary's Cathedral, Diyarbakır

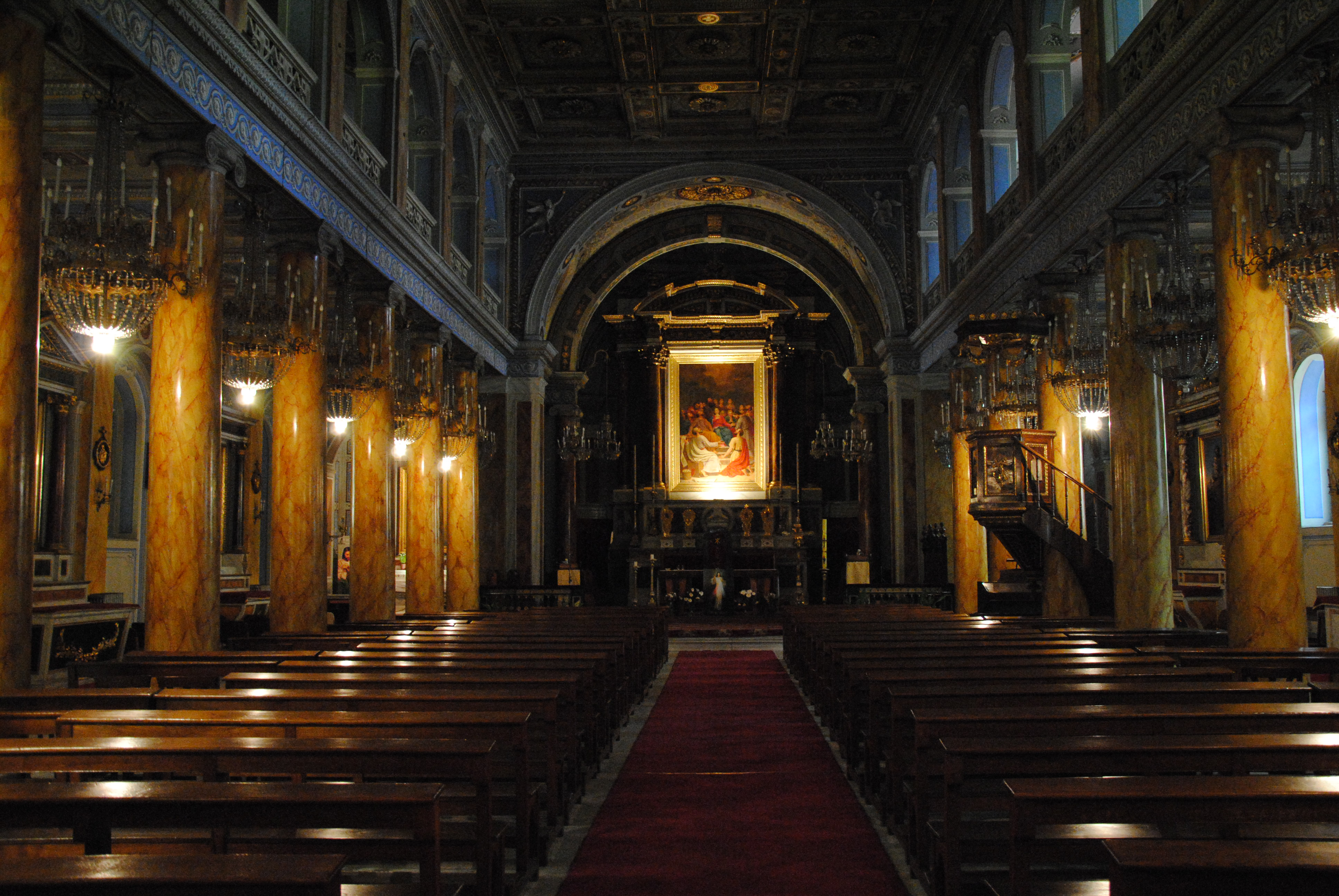
Latin Catholic Cathedral of the Holy Spirit, Istanbul

== See also ==
- List of cathedrals
- List of active Armenian churches in Turkey
