= List of cathedrals in Kazakhstan =

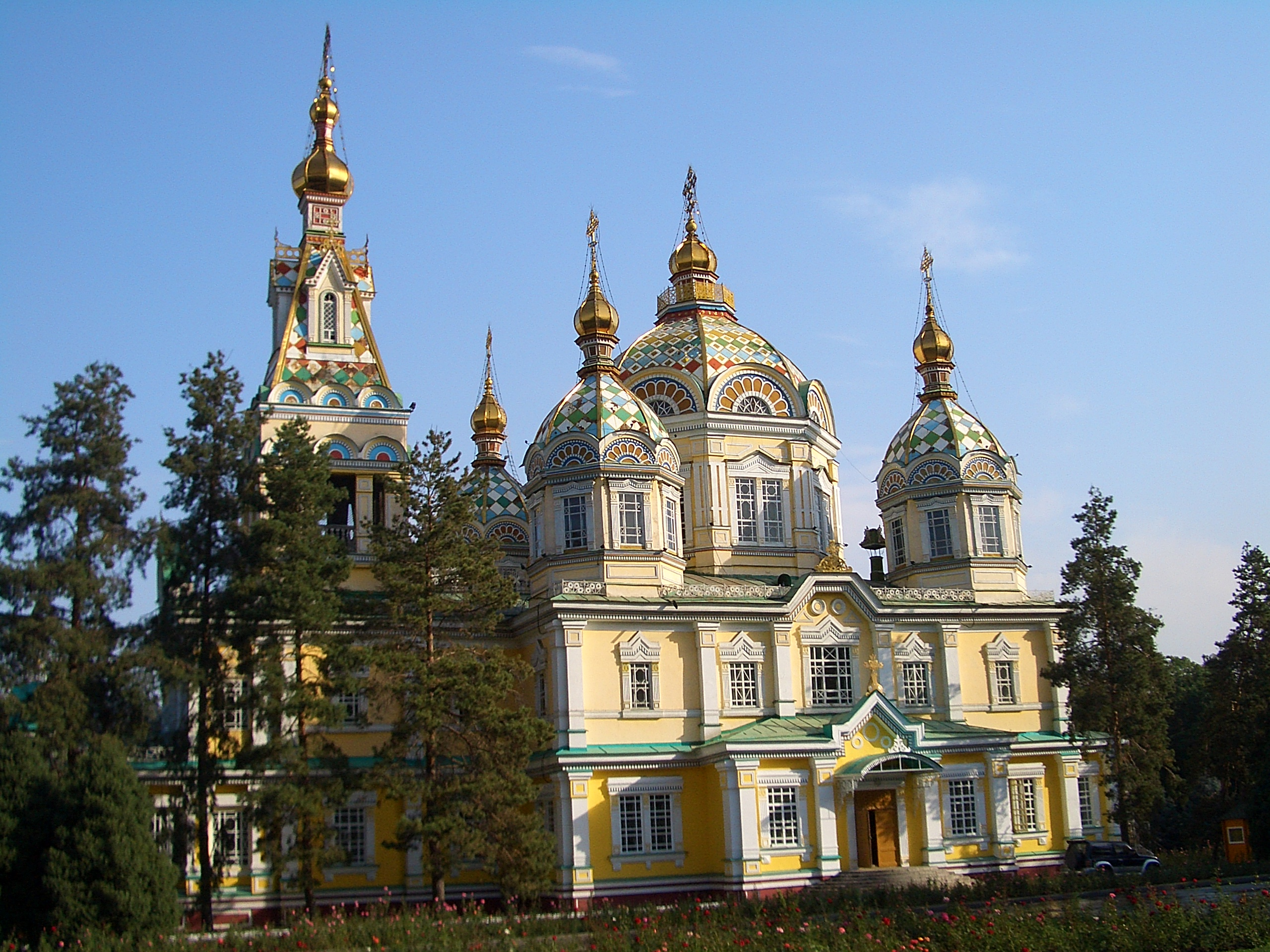
Co-Cathedral of the Ascension in Almaty.

This is the list of cathedrals in Kazakhstan sorted by denomination.

== Eastern Orthodox ==
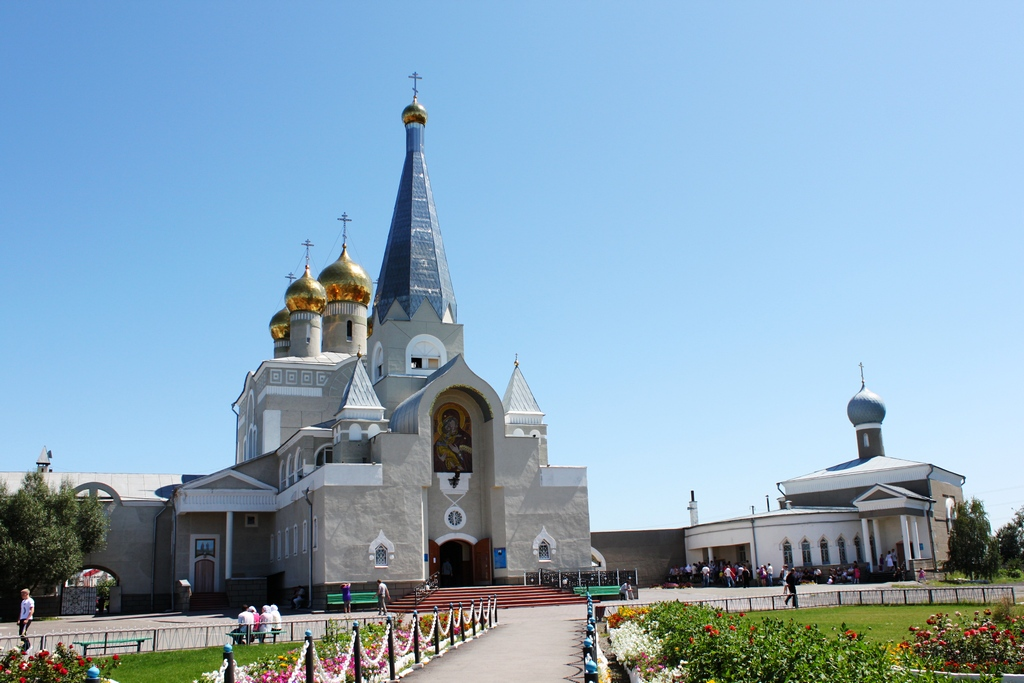
Russian Orthodox Cathedral, Karaganda

Cathedrals of the Russian Orthodox:

- Assumption Cathedral in Astana
- Co-Cathedral of the Ascension of the Lord in Almaty
- Russian Orthodox Cathedral in Karaganda
- St. Michael's Cathedral in Uralsk
- Cathedral of St. Nicholas in Shymkent
- St. Nicholas Cathedral (Almaty)

== Catholic ==
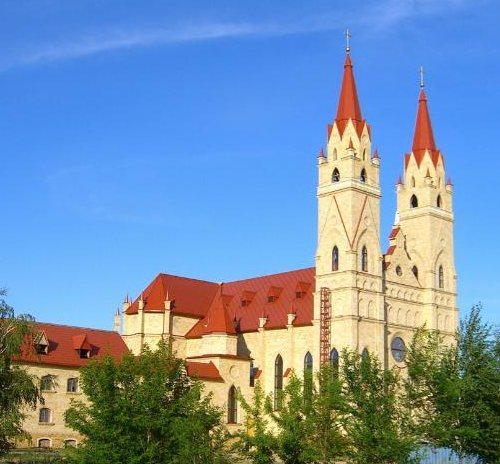
Our Lady of Fatima Cathedral, Karaganda

Cathedrals of the Catholic Church in Kazakhstan:

- Cathedral of Our Mother of Perpetual Help in Astana
- Cathedral of the Holy Trinity in Almaty
- Cathedral of the Our Lady of Fátima in Karaganda
- Cathedral of the Transfiguration of Our Lord in Atyrau

Former cathedral

Cathedral of St. Joseph, Karaganda

== Evangelical Lutheran ==
- Cathedral of Christ the Saviour in Astana

== See also ==
- Lists of cathedrals by country
- Christianity in Kazakhstan
