= List of cathedrals in Timor-Leste =

This is the list of cathedrals in East Timor.

== Catholic ==
Cathedrals of the Catholic Church in East Timor:

- St. Anthony Cathedral, Baucau
- Cathedral of the Immaculate Conception in Díli
- Sacred Heart Cathedral, Maliana

== See also ==
- List of cathedrals
