= List of cathedrals in Liberia =

This is the list of cathedrals in Liberia sorted by denomination.

== Catholic ==
Cathedrals of the Catholic Church in Liberia:

- Cathedral of St. Therese of the Child Jesus in Cape Palmas
- Cathedral of the Holy Spirit in Gbarnga
- Sacred Heart Cathedral, Monrovia

== Anglican ==
Cathedrals of the Church of the Province of West Africa:

- Trinity Cathedral in Monrovia

== See also ==
- List of cathedrals
