= List of cathedrals in Palestine =

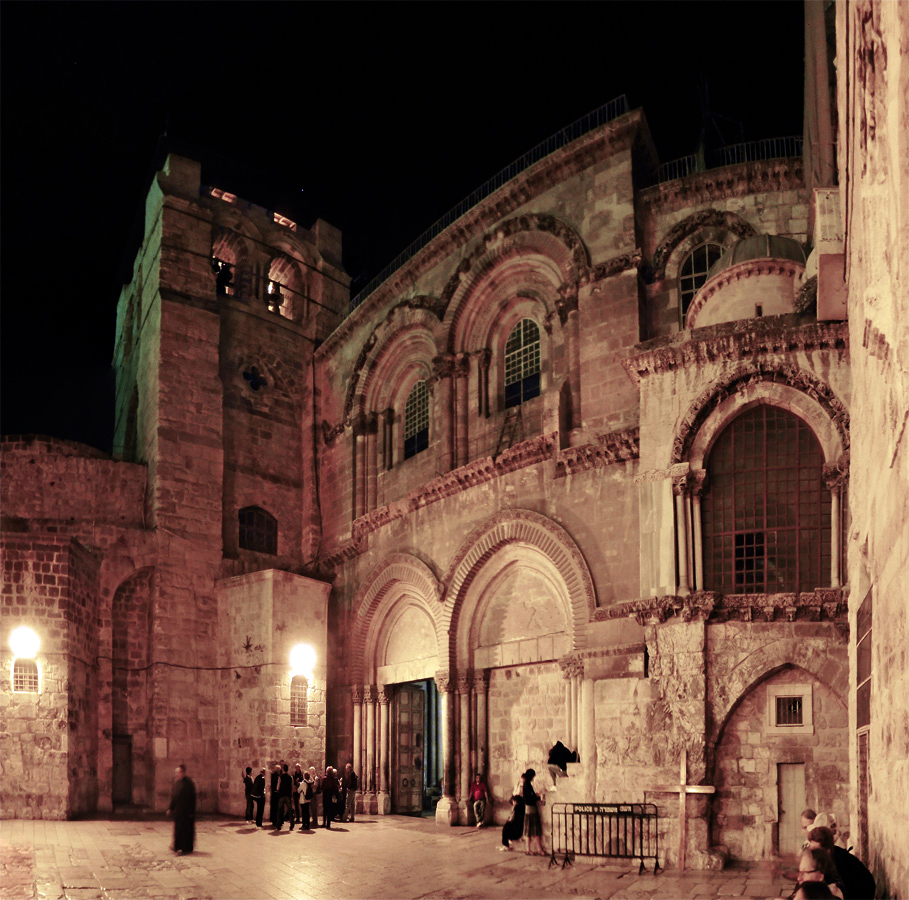
Church of the Holy Sepulchre in the Old City of Jerusalem

A cathedral is a church that contains the cathedra (Greek for 'seat') of a bishop, thus serving as the central church of a diocese, conference, or episcopate.

== Cathedrals ==
Cathedrals in Palestine
| Cathedral | Image | Denomination | Location | Completion |
|---|---|---|---|---|
| Church of the Holy Sepulchre | From left to right, the bell tower, rotunda (big dome), catholicon (small dome), and ambulatory (passage) | Catholic Church, Greek Orthodox Church, Armenian Apostolic Church and minor rights to Syriac Orthodox Church, Coptic Orthodox Church, Ethiopian Orthodox Church | Old City of Jerusalem, Jerusalem Governorate, West Bank | 1048 (977–978 years ago) |
| Cathedral of Saint James | Heavily ornamented interior of the cathedral | | | |
| Holy Trinity Cathedral | A white cathedral with various towers ending in crosses | | | |
| St. George's Cathedral, Jerusalem | A brick cathedral with a tower on the right and a pillar ending with a cross on the front left | | | |
| Pro-Cathedral of the Most Holy Name of Jesus | A white cathedral with potted vegetation next to the entrance and a glass mosaic above it | | | |
| Former Cathedral of St. John the Baptist | Brick ruins | | | |
| Cathedral of Our Lady of the Annunciation, Jerusalem | Paintings of Jesus encased in gold, with a chandelier and some crosses | | | |
| Church of Saint Thomas, Jerusalem | View of a brick building along a road | | | |
| Church of Our Lady of Sorrows, Jerusalem | The entrance to a white, stone cathedral with a cross on the top | | | |

== See also ==
- Lists of cathedrals
- Palestinian Christians
