= List of cathedrals in Costa Rica =

This is the list of cathedrals in Costa Rica sorted by denomination.

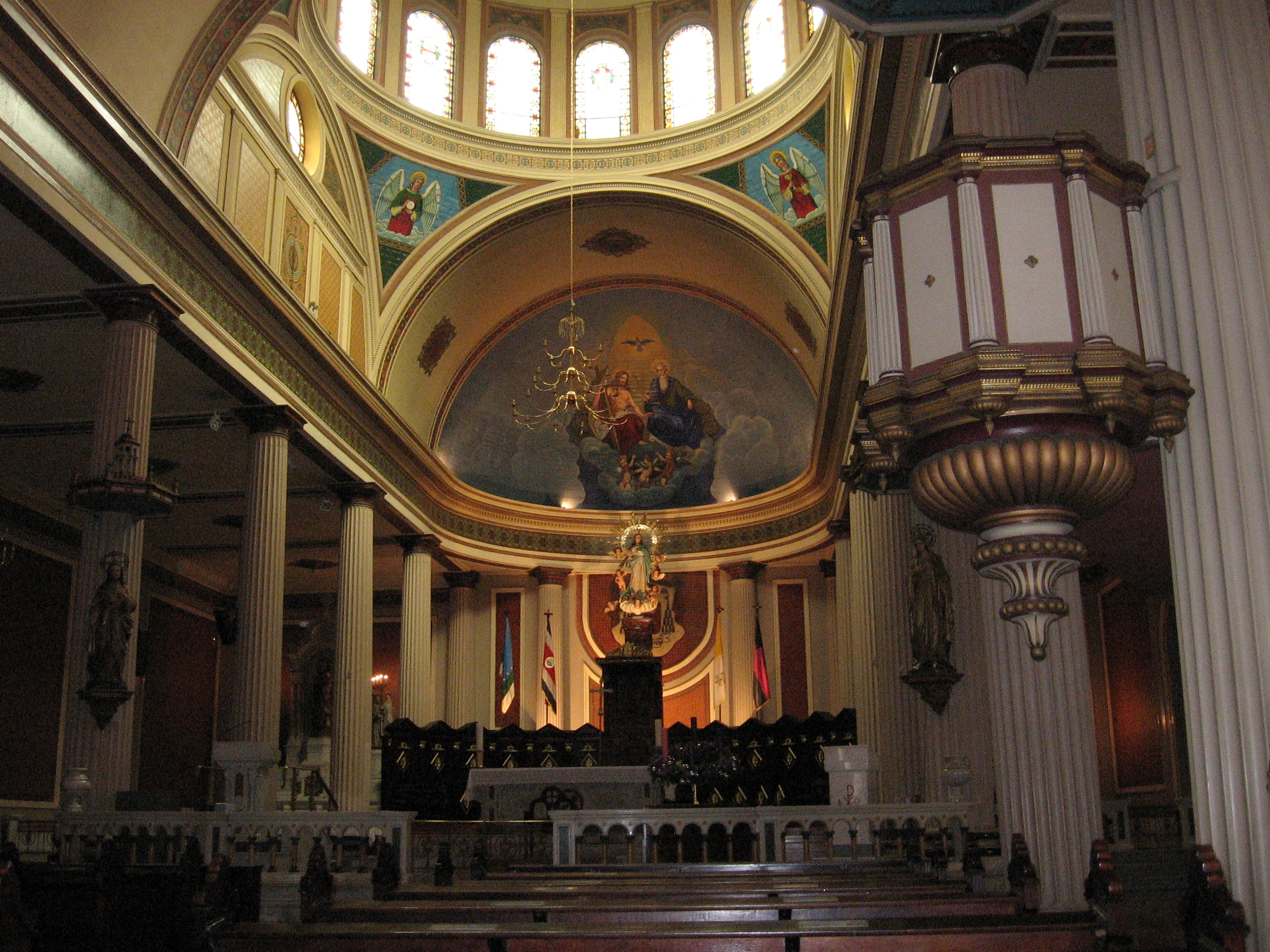
San José Cathedral

== Catholic ==
Cathedrals of the Catholic Church in Costa Rica:

- Cathedral of Our Lady of the Pillar in Alajuela.
- Cathedral of Our Lady of Carmel in Cartago
- Cathedral of St. Charles Borromeo in Ciudad Quesada.
- Cathedral of the Sacred Heart of Jesus in Limón.
- Cathedral of Our Lady of Mount Carmel in Puntarenas.
- Cathedral of St. Isidore in San Isidro de Pérez Zeledón.
- Metropolitan Cathedral of St. Joseph in San Jose.
- Cathedral of Tilarán
- Co-Cathedral of the Immaculate Conception in Liberia.

== See also ==
- Lists of cathedrals
