= List of cathedrals in Malta =

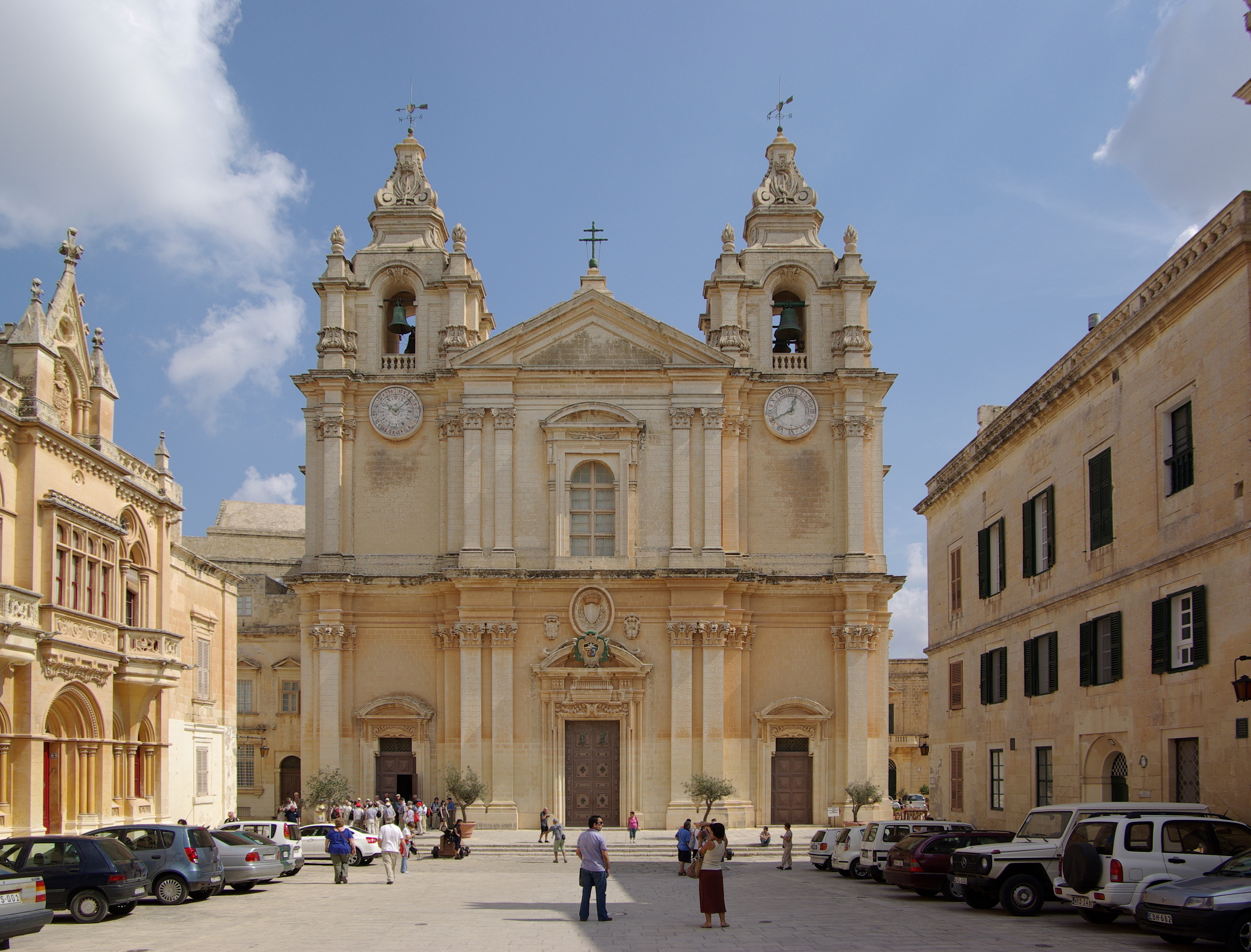
St Paul's Metropolitan Cathedral in Mdina.

This is the list of cathedrals in Malta sorted by denomination.

== Catholic ==
Cathedrals of the Archdiocese of Malta:

- St. Paul's Metropolitan Cathedral in Mdina
- St John's Co-Cathedral in Valletta

Cathedral of the Roman Catholic Diocese of Gozo

- Cathedral of the Assumption of the Blessed Virgin Mary in Victoria, Gozo

== Anglican ==
Cathedral of the Diocese of Gibraltar in Europe:

- St Paul's Pro-Cathedral in Valletta

== See also ==
- List of cathedrals
