= List of cathedrals in Senegal =

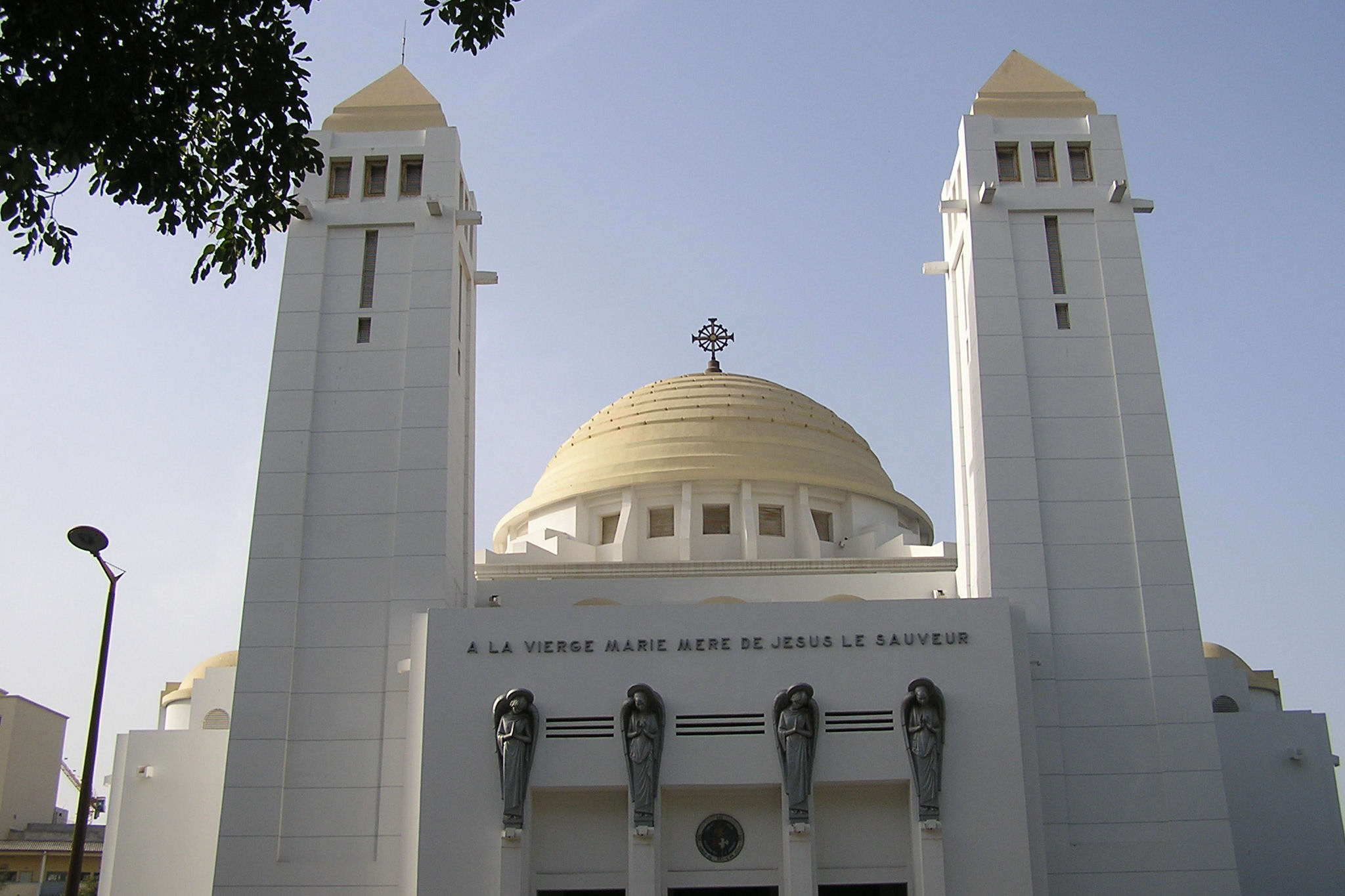
Cathedral of Our Lady of Victories in Dakar.

This is the list of cathedrals in Senegal.

== Catholic ==
Cathedrals of the Catholic Church in Senegal:

- Cathedral of Our Lady of Victories in Dakar
- Cathédrale Saint-Théophile in Kaolack
- Cathedral of Our Lady of Victory in Kolda
- Cathedral of St. Louis in Saint-Louis
- Cathedral of Mary Queen of the World in Tambacounda
- St. Anne Cathedral in Thiès
- Cathedral of St. Anthony of Padua in Ziguinchor

== See also ==
- List of cathedrals
