= List of cathedrals in Zambia =

This is the list of cathedrals in Zambia sorted by denomination.

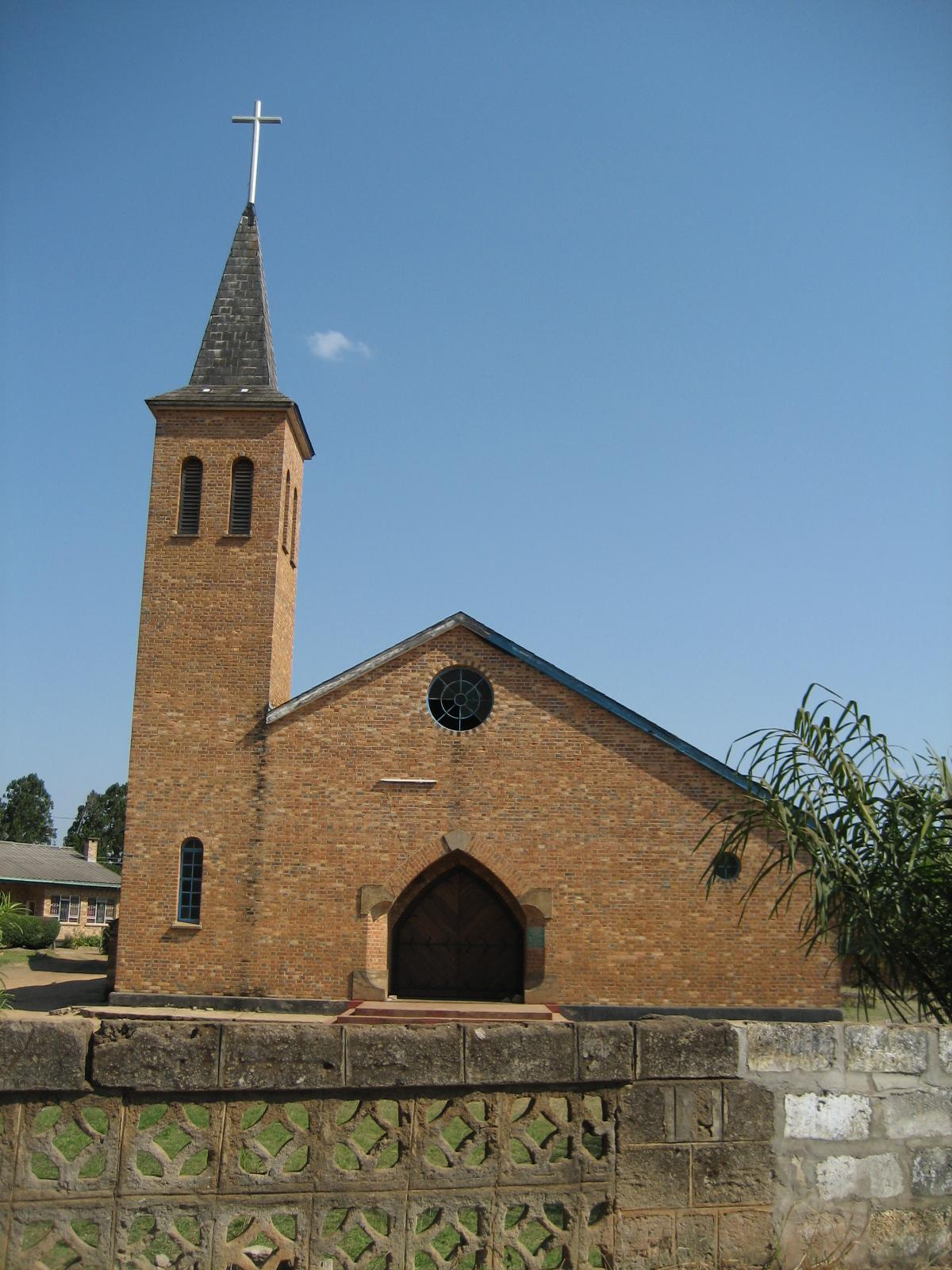
Cathedral of the Assumption of Our Lady in Mansa

== Catholic ==
Cathedrals of the Catholic Church in Zambia:

- Cathedral of St. Anne in Chipata
- Cathedral of the Sacred Heart in Kabwe
- Cathedral of St. John the Apostle in Kasama
- Cathedral of St. Theresa in Livingstone
- Cathedral of the Child Jesus in Lusaka
- Cathedral of the Assumption of Our Lady in Mansa
- Cathedral of Our Lady of Lourdes in Mongu
- Cathedral of Our Lady of Lourdes in Monze
- Cathedral of St. Joseph the Worker in Mpika
- Cathedral of Christ the King in Ndola
- Cathedral of St. Daniel in Solwezi

== Anglican ==
Cathedrals of the Church of the Province of Central Africa in Zambia:

- Cathedral of the Holy Nativity in Ndola
- Cathedral of St Michael's in Kitwe
- Cathedral of the Holy Cross in Lusaka
- St Luke's Cathedral in Msoro

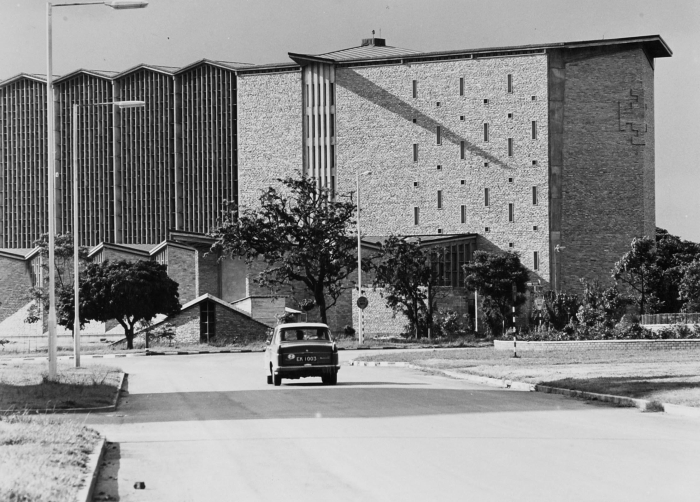
The Cathedral of the Holy Cross in 1960–1970 in Lusaka, Tropenmuseum picture collection in Amsterdam.

== See also ==
- List of cathedrals
