= List of cathedrals in Nicaragua =

This is the list of cathedrals in Nicaragua.

== Catholic ==
Cathedrals of the Catholic Church in Nicaragua:

Name	Year	City	Image	Location	Remarks
Cathedral of Our Lady of the Rosary; Catedral Nuestra Señora del Rosario		Bluefields			
Cathedral of Our Lady of the Most Holy Rosary; Catedral Nuestra Señora del Rosario	1888	Estelí		13.092959°N 86.355388°W	
Cathedral of Our Lady of the Assumption; Catedral de Nuestra Señora de la Asunción	1910	Granada		11.929918°N 85.953389°W	
Cathedral of St. John; Catedral San Juan de Jinotega	1882	Jinotega		13.091909°N 86.002337°W	
Cathedral of Our Lady of the Assumption; Catedral de Nuestra Señora de la Asunción	1966	Juigalpa		12.106595°N 85.364207°W	
Cathedral of Our Lady of the Assumption; Real e Insigne Basilica Catedral de León	1814	León		12.435°N 86.878105°W	
Cathedral of St. Peter; Catedral de San Pedro de Matagalpa	1895	Matagalpa		12.928658°N 85.918268°W	
Metropolitan Cathedral of Saint James; Catedral Metropolitana de Santiago	1938	Managua		12.15629°N 86.271263°W	
Metropolitan Cathedral of the Immaculate Conception; Catedral Metropolitana de la Inmaculada Concepción	1993	Managua		12.132706°N 86.266012°W	

== Anglican ==
Cathedrals of the Anglican Church in Nicaragua:

Name	Year	City	Image	Location	Remarks
St. Mark's Cathedral; Catedral San Marcos	1998	Bluefields		12.011516°N 83.762923°W	The cathedral was destroyed by Hurricane Joan in 1988 and rebuilt 10 years later.

== See also ==
- Lists of cathedrals
