= List of cathedrals in Ivory Coast =

St. Paul’s Metropolitan Cathedral in Abidjan.

This is the list of cathedrals in Côte d'Ivoire.

== Catholic ==
Cathedrals of the Catholic Church in Côte d'Ivoire:

1. Cathedral of St. Theresa of the Child Jesus in Abengourou
2. St. Paul’s Metropolitan Cathedral in Abidjan
3. Cathedral of St. John Vianney in Agboville
4. Cathedral of St. Odilia in Bondoukou
5. Cathedral of St. Theresa of the Child Jesus in Bouaké
6. Cathedral of Christ the King in Daloa
7. Cathedral of St. Ann in Gagnoa
8. Cathedral of the Sacred Heart in Grand-Bassam
9. Cathedral of St. Joan of Arc in Katiola
10. Cathedral of St. John the Baptist in Korhogo
11. Cathedral of St. Michael in Man
12. Cathedral of St. Augustine in Odienné
13. St. Peter’s Cathedral in San Pedro
14. Cathedral of St. Augustine in Yamoussoukro
15. Cathedral of St. Andrew in Yopougon

== See also ==
- List of cathedrals
