= List of cathedrals in the Netherlands =

This is the list of cathedrals in the Netherlands sorted by denomination.

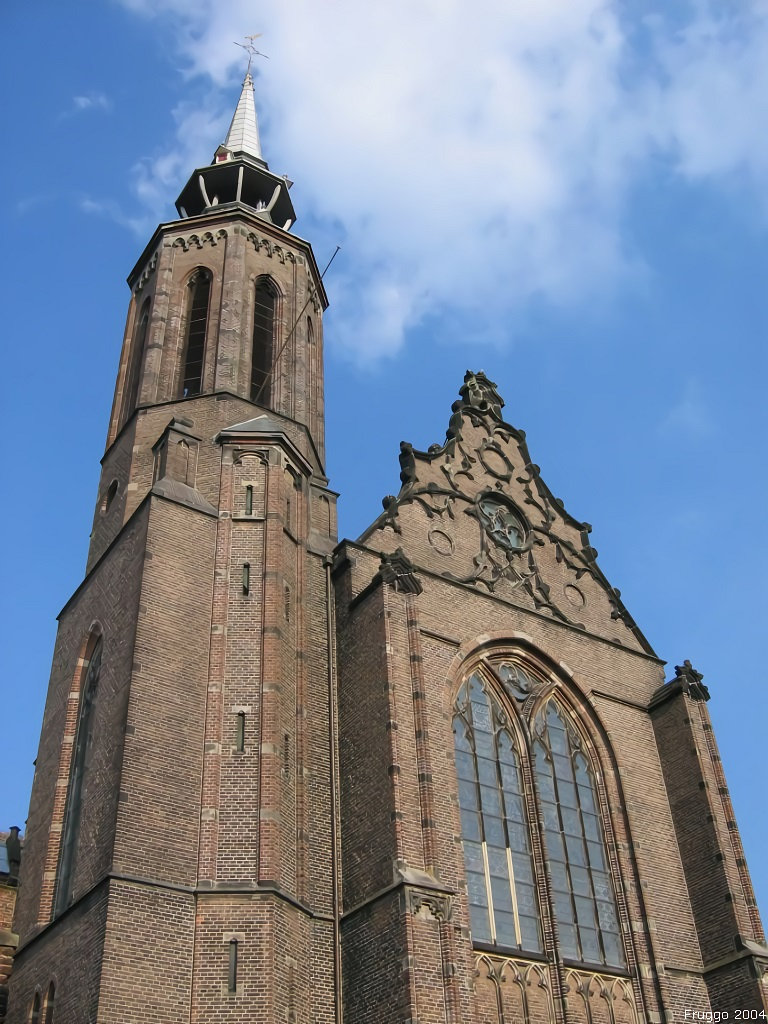
Cathedral of St. Catherine in Utrecht

== Catholic ==
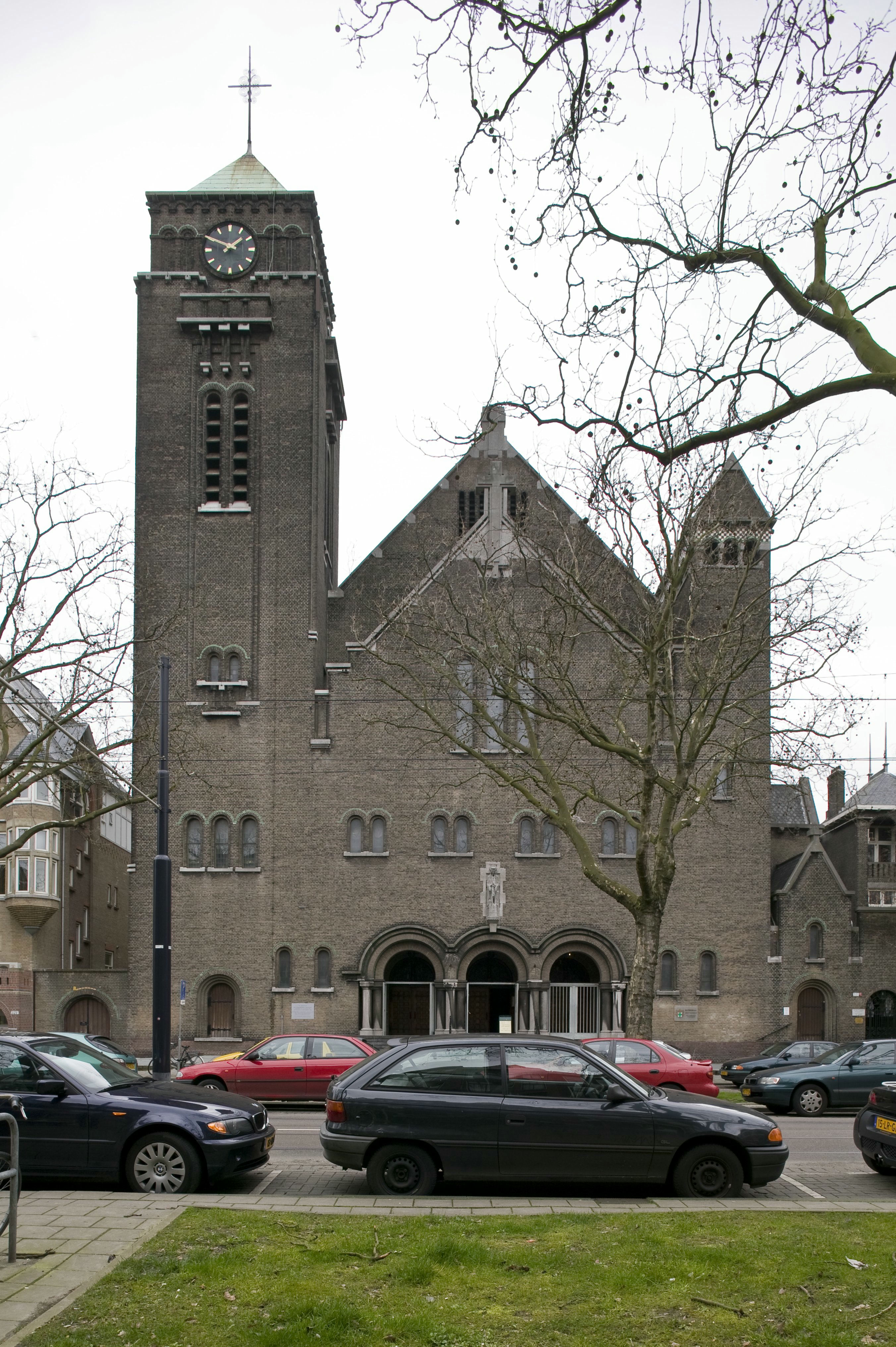
St Lawrence and St Elizabeth Cathedral, Rotterdam

Cathedrals of the Catholic Church in the Netherlands:

- Cathedral Basilica of St. John in 's-Hertogenbosch
- Cathedral of St. Anthony of Padua in Breda
- Basilica of Saint Nicholas, Amsterdam
- Cathedral of St. Joseph in Groningen
- Cathedral Basilica of St. Bavo in Haarlem
- Cathedral of St. Christopher in Roermond
- Cathedral of St. Lawrence and St. Elizabeth in Rotterdam
- Cathedral of St. Catherine in Utrecht
- Cathedral Queen of the Most Holy Rosary in Willemstad, Curacao

== Old Catholic ==
Old Catholic cathedrals in the Netherlands:

- Cathedral Church of St. Gertrude in Utrecht
- Cathedral Church of St. Anna and Mary in Haarlem

== Note ==
St. Martin's Cathedral in Utrecht is called a cathedral ("domkerk"), but belongs to the Protestant Church in the Netherlands which does not have an episcopal structure.

== See also ==
- Lists of cathedrals by country
