= List of cathedrals in the Bahamas =

This is the list of cathedrals in the Bahamas sorted by denomination.

== Anglican ==
- Christ Church Cathedral, Nassau (Church in the Province of the West Indies)

== Catholic ==
Cathedrals of the Catholic Church in the Bahamas:

- St. Francis Xavier Cathedral, Nassau

== See also ==
- List of cathedrals
