= List of cathedrals in Bosnia and Herzegovina =

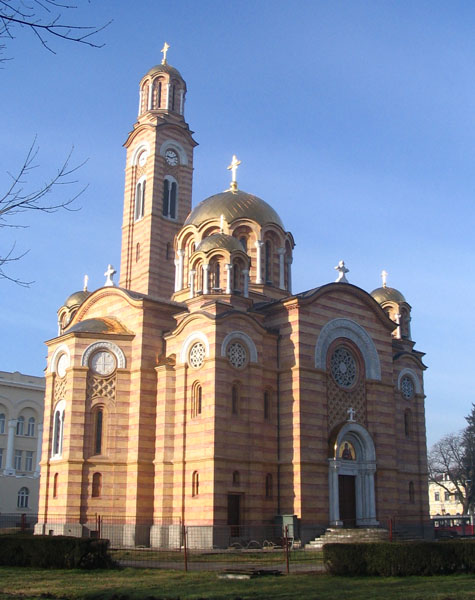
Cathedral of Christ the Saviour in Banja Luka

This is a list of cathedrals in Bosnia and Herzegovina, sorted by denomination.

== Eastern Orthodox ==
Cathedrals of the Serbian Orthodox Church:

- Nativity of the Theotokos Cathedral in Sarajevo
- Cathedral of Christ the Saviour in Banja Luka
- Cathedral of Holy Transfiguration in Trebinje
- Cathedral Church of the Holy Trinity in Mostar
- Cathedral Church of the Ascension in Nevesinje
- Cathedral of the Holy Apostles Peter and Paul in Bosanski Petrovac
- Co-Cathedral of the Descent of the Holy Spirit on the Apostles in Bihać
- Co-Cathedral of Birth of St. John the Baptist in Šipovo

== Catholic Church ==
Cathedrals of the Catholic Church in Bosnia and Herzegovina:

| Image | Name and dedication | Diocese | Built |
|---|---|---|---|
| | Sarajevo Cathedral; Sacred Heart Cathedral | Archdiocese of Vrhbosna | 1889 |
| | Mostar Cathedral; Cathedral of Mary, Mother of the Church | Diocese of Mostar-Duvno | 1972 |
| | Banja Luka Cathedral; Cathedral of Saint Bonaventure | Diocese of Banja Luka | 1973 |
| | Trebinje Cathedral; Cathedral of the Birth of Mary | Diocese of Trebinje-Mrkan | 1884 |

== See also ==
- Lists of cathedrals by country
- Orthodoxy in Bosnia and Herzegovina
