= List of cathedrals in Singapore =

The list of cathedrals in Singapore, sorted by denominations, is as follows:

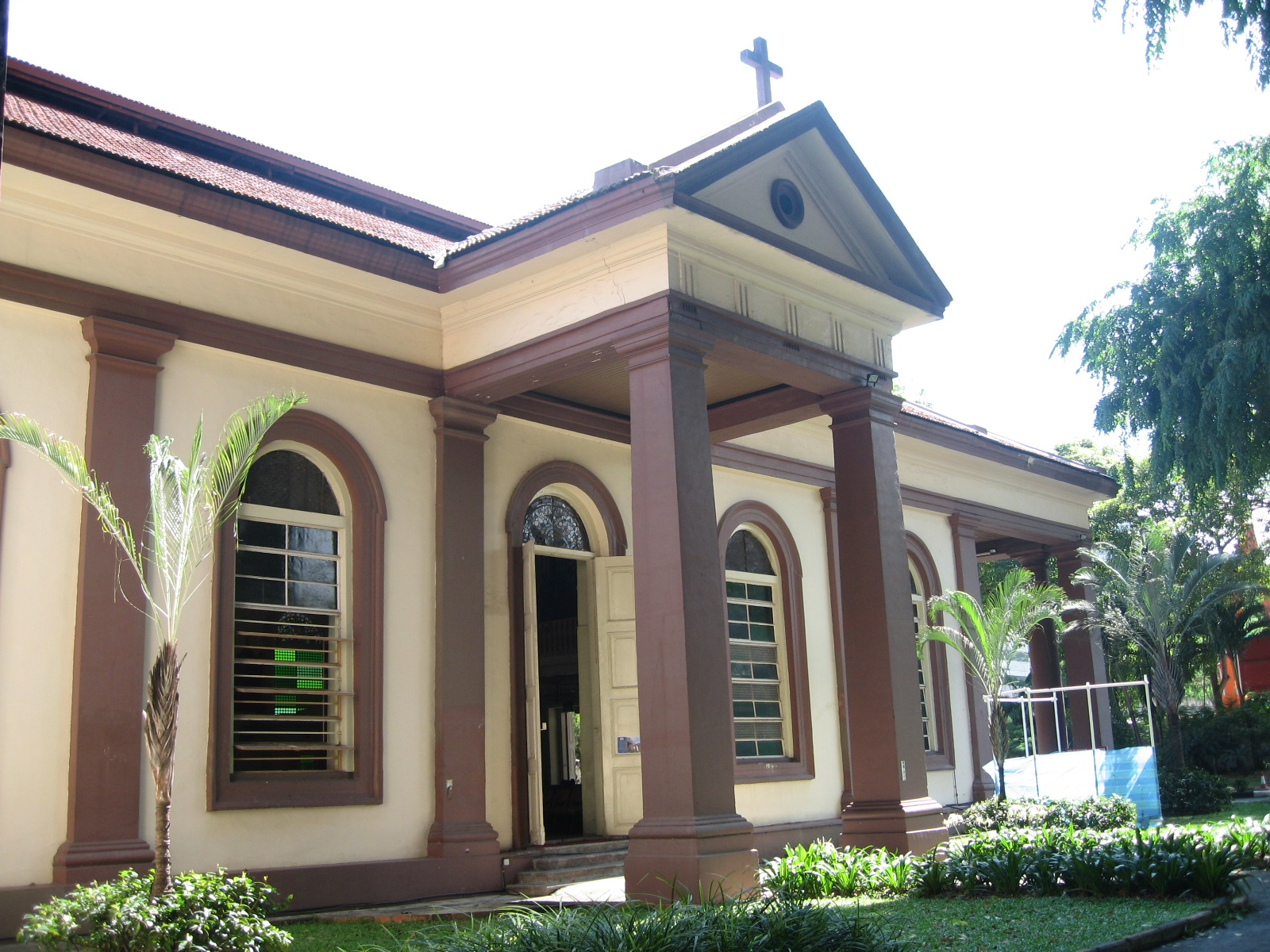
Cathedral of the Good Shepherd

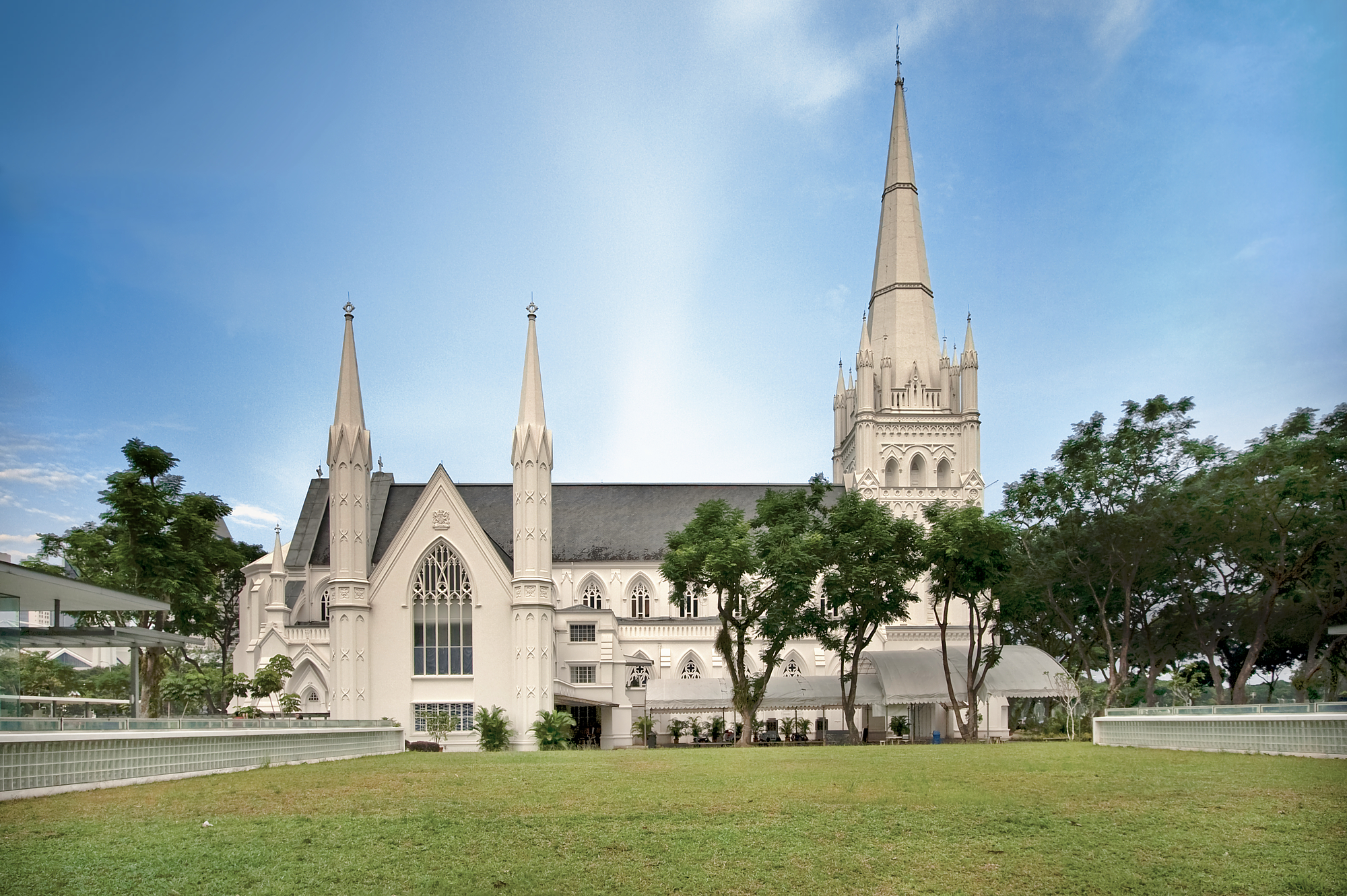
St Andrew's Cathedral

== Catholicism ==
- Cathedral of the Good Shepherd, Civic District

== Anglicanism ==
- St. Andrew's Cathedral, Downtown Core

== Eastern Orthodoxy ==
- Holy Resurrection Cathedral of Singapore

== See also ==
- List of cathedrals
- Christianity in Singapore
