= List of cathedrals in Chad =

This is the list of cathedrals in Chad sorted by denomination.

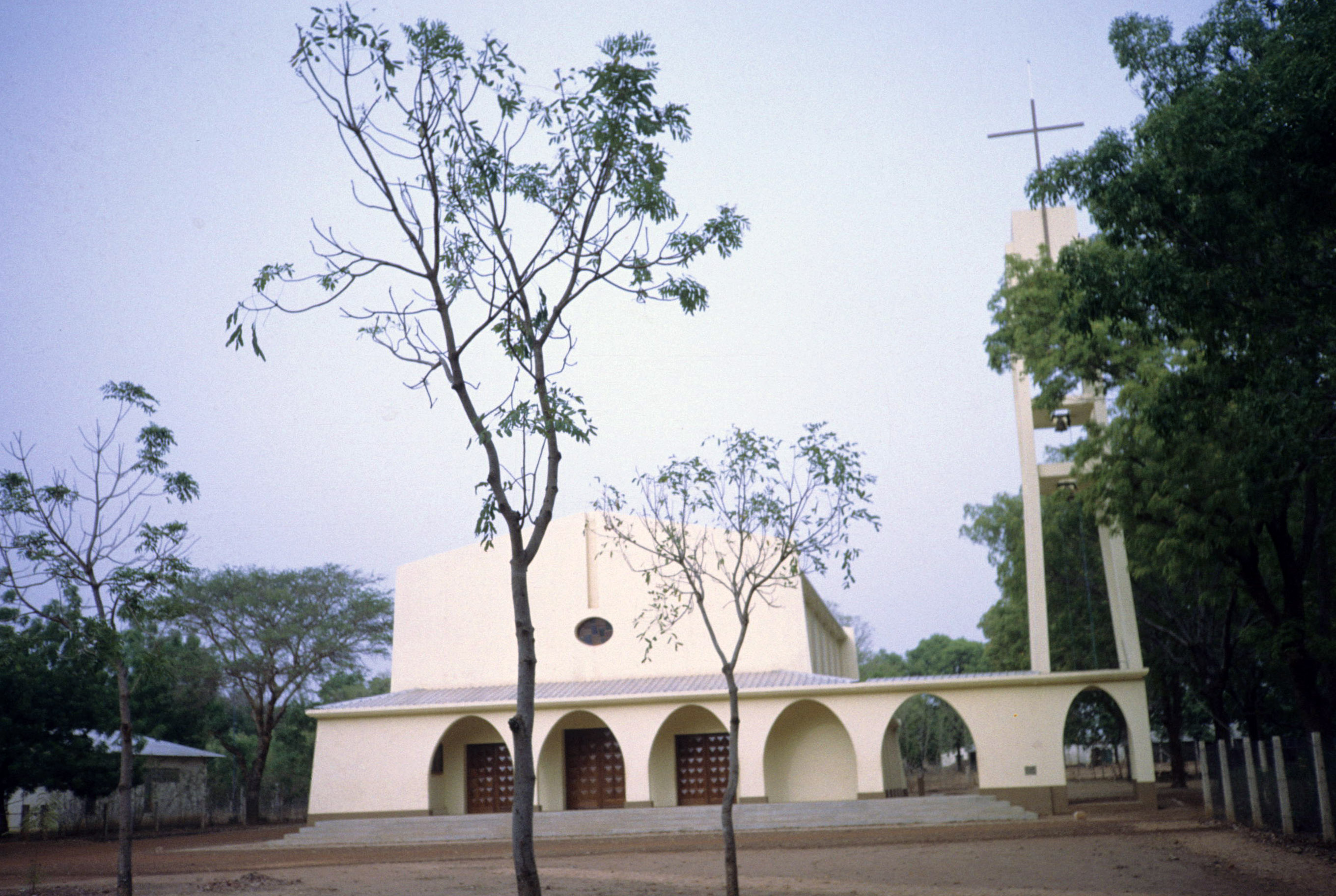
Cathedral of Sts. Peter and Paul in Pala

== Catholic ==
Cathedrals and pro-cathedrals of the Catholic Church in Chad:

- Cathedral of St. Theresa in Doba
- Cathedral of St. Mary of the Angels in Goré
- Cathedral of St. Ignatius in Mongo
- Cathedral of the Sacred Heart in Moundou
- Cathedral of Our Lady in Ndjamena
- Cathedral of Sts. Peter and Paul in Pala
- Cathedral of Our Lady of the Immaculate Conception in Sarh
- Pro-cathedral of the Holy Family in Laï

== See also ==
- List of cathedrals
