= List of cathedrals in Burundi =

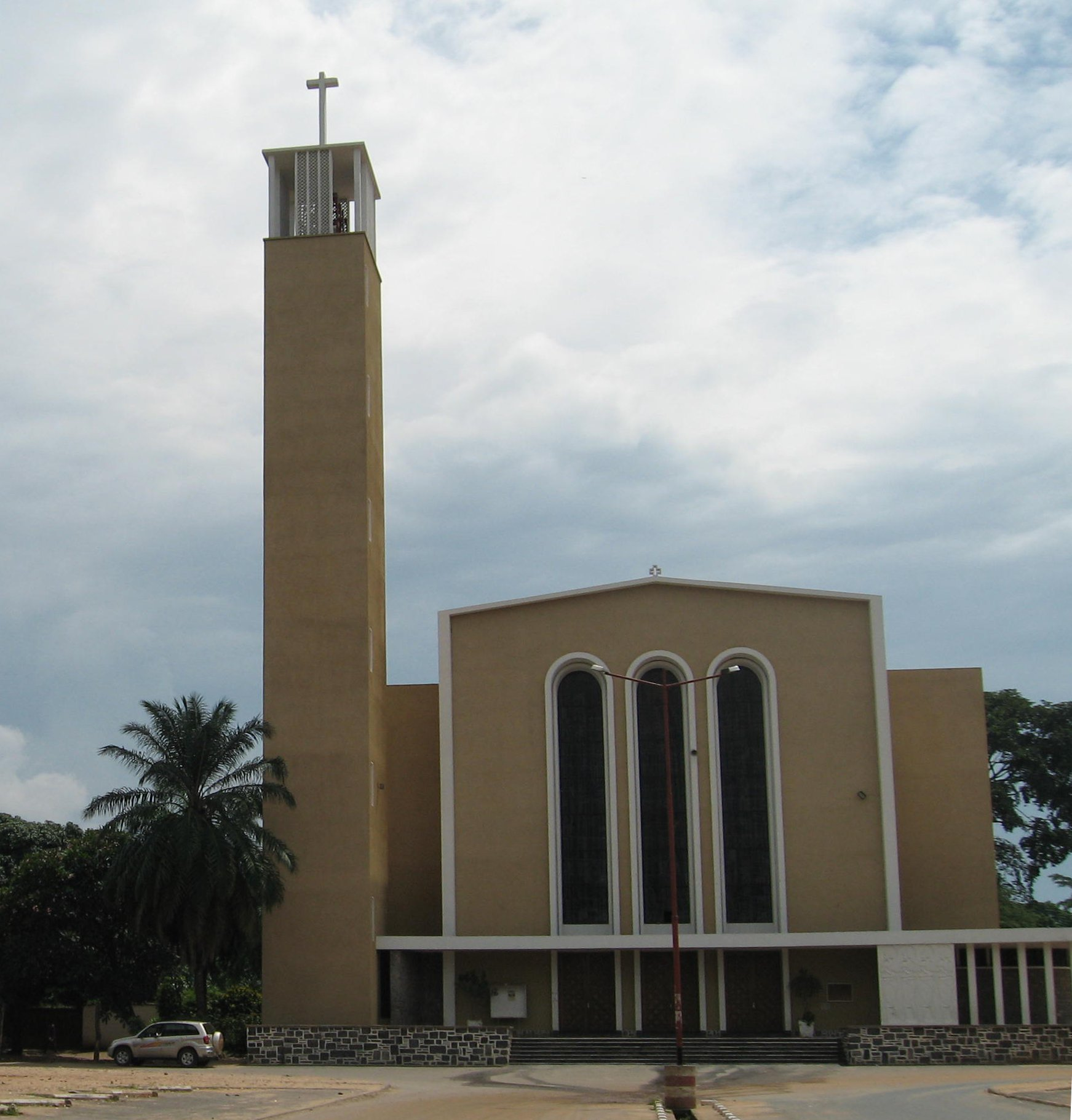
Queen of the World Cathedral in Bujumbura.

This is the list of Burundi cathedrals, sorted by denomination.

== Catholic ==
Cathedrals of the Catholic Church in Burundi:

- Cathedral of Christ the King in Bubanza
- Queen of the World Cathedral in Bujumbura
- Cathedral of Christ the King in Bururi
- Cathedral of Christ the King in Gitega
- Cathedral of Our Lady of Fatima in Muyinga
- Cathedral of Our Lady of Fatima in Ngozi
- Cathedral of St. Joseph in Rutana
- Cathedral of Ruyigi

== See also ==
- List of cathedrals
- Christianity in Burundi
