= List of cathedrals in Dominica =

This is the list of cathedrals in Dominica sorted by denomination.

== Catholic ==
Cathedrals of the Catholic Church in Dominica:

- Roseau Cathedral, Roseau

== See also ==
- Lists of cathedrals
