= List of cathedrals in Zimbabwe =

This is the list of cathedrals in Zimbabwe sorted by denomination.

== Catholic ==
Cathedrals of the Catholic Church in Zimbabwe:

- Cathedral of the Immaculate Conception in Bulawayo|
- Cathedral of St Theresa in Gweru
- Cathedral of the Sacred Heart in Harare
- Cathedral of Ss Peter and Paul in Masvingo
- Holy Trinity Cathedral in Mutare

== Anglican ==
Cathedrals of the Church of the Province of Central Africa in Zimbabwe:

- St Johns Cathedral in Bulawayo (Diocese of Matabeleland)

Anglican St Johns Cathedral

- St Cuthbert's Cathedral in Gweru
- Cathedral of Saint Mary and All Saints in Harare
- Cathedral of St John the Baptist in Mutare (Diocese of Manicaland)

== See also ==
- List of cathedrals
- Christianity in Zimbabwe
