= List of cathedrals in Israel =

This is the list of cathedrals in Israel, sorted by denomination.

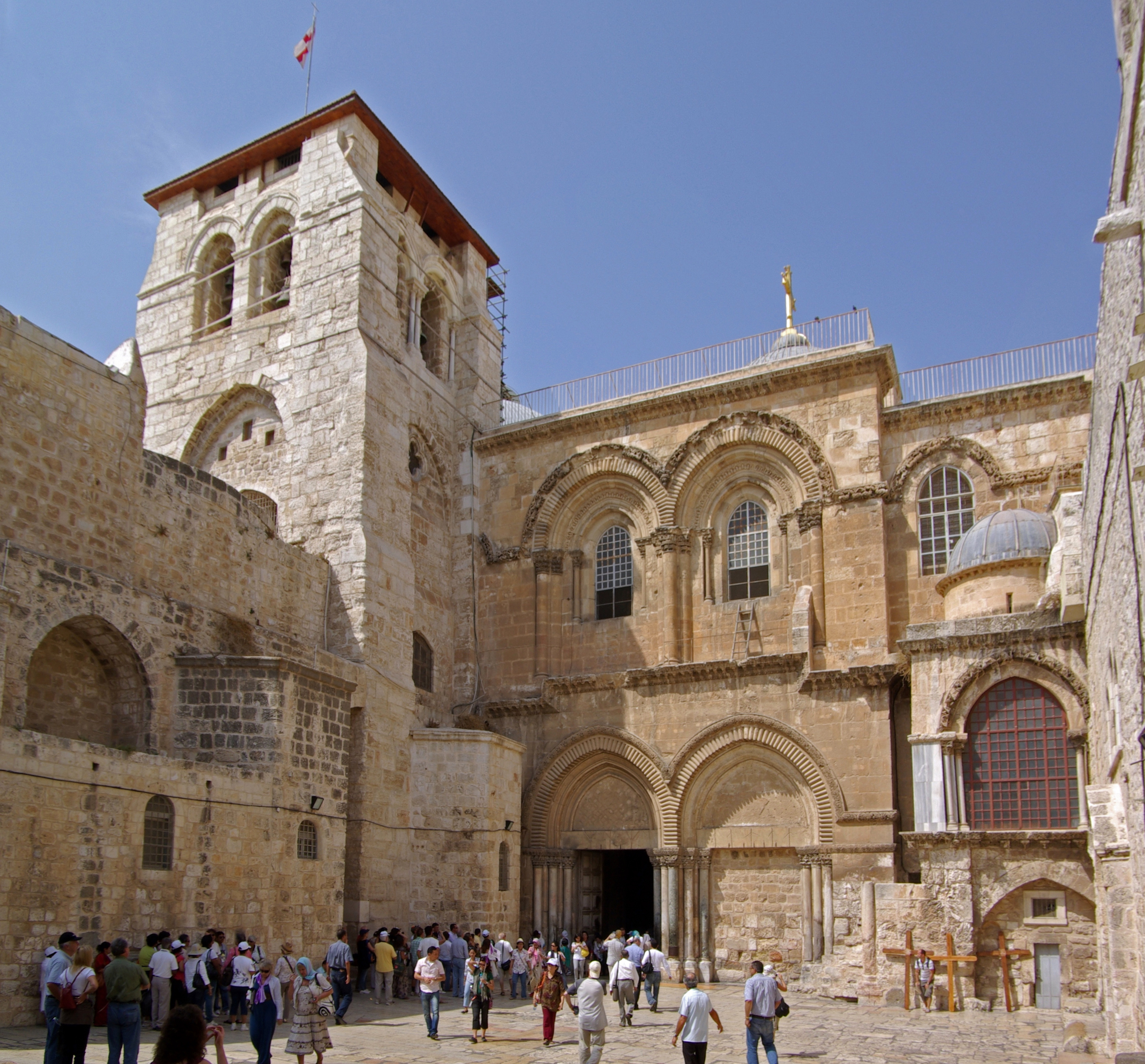
Church of the Holy Sepulchre in Jerusalem's Old City

== Church of the Holy Sepulchre ==
- Church of the Holy Sepulchre in Jerusalem's Old City (home of six denominations: Catholic, Greek Orthodox, Armenian Apostolic, Syriac Orthodox, Coptic Orthodox and Ethiopian Orthodox.)

== Catholic Church ==
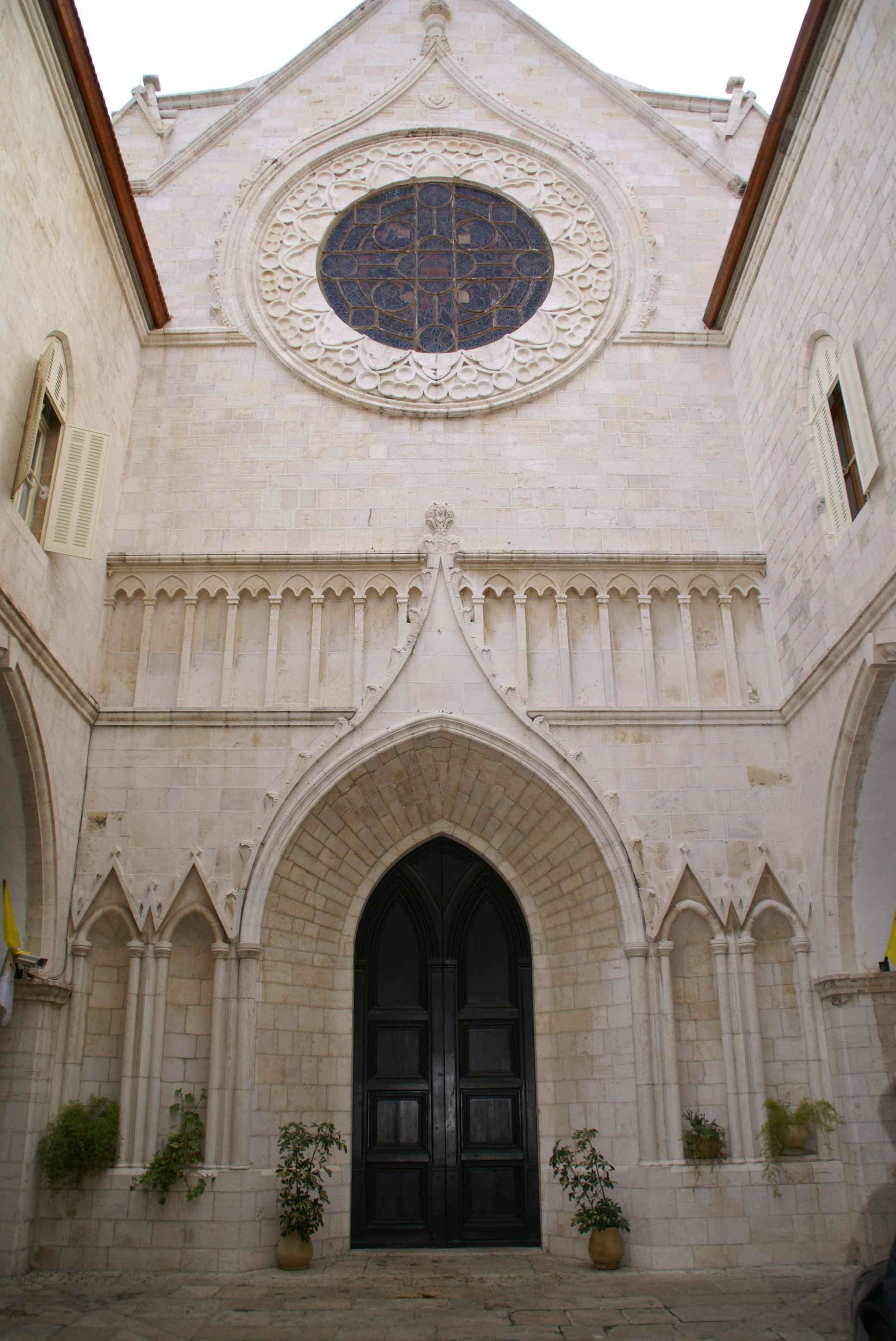
Co-Cathedral of the Most Holy Name of Jesus

Cathedrals of the Catholic Church in Israel:

- St. Elijah Cathedral in Haifa (Melkite Greek Rite)
- Cathedral of St. Louis the King in Haifa (Maronite Rite)
- Co-Cathedral of the Most Holy Name of Jesus in Jerusalem's Old City (Latin Rite)
- Cathedral of the Annunciation of the Virgin in Jerusalem (Melkite Greek Rite)
- Church of St. Thomas in Jerusalem (Syriac Catholic Rite)
- Church of Our Lady of the Spasm in Jerusalem (Armenian Catholic Rite)

== Eastern Orthodox ==
Eastern Orthodox cathedrals in Israel:

- Holy Trinity Cathedral in Jerusalem (Russian Orthodox)

== Oriental Orthodox ==
Oriental Orthodox cathedrals in Israel:

- Cathedral of St. James in Jerusalem's Old City (Armenian Apostolic)

== Anglican ==
Anglican Cathedrals in Israel:

- St. George's Cathedral in Jerusalem (of the Episcopal Church in Jerusalem and the Middle East)

== Lutheran ==
Lutheran Cathedrals in Israel:

- Church of the Redeemer, Jerusalem in Jerusalem (of the home of two lutheran denominations: Arab-speaking Evangelical Lutheran Church in Jordan and the Holy Land, and a german-speaking community of the Evangelical (Protestant) Church in Germany )

== See also ==
- Lists of cathedrals
- Christianity in Israel
