= List of cathedrals in Cape Verde =

This is a list of cathedrals in Cape Verde.

== List ==
Catholic cathedrals:

- Pro-Cathedral of Our Lady of the Light, Mindelo
- Pro-Cathedral of Our Lady of Grace, Praia
