= List of cathedrals in Sri Lanka =

This is the list of cathedrals in Sri Lanka sorted by denomination.

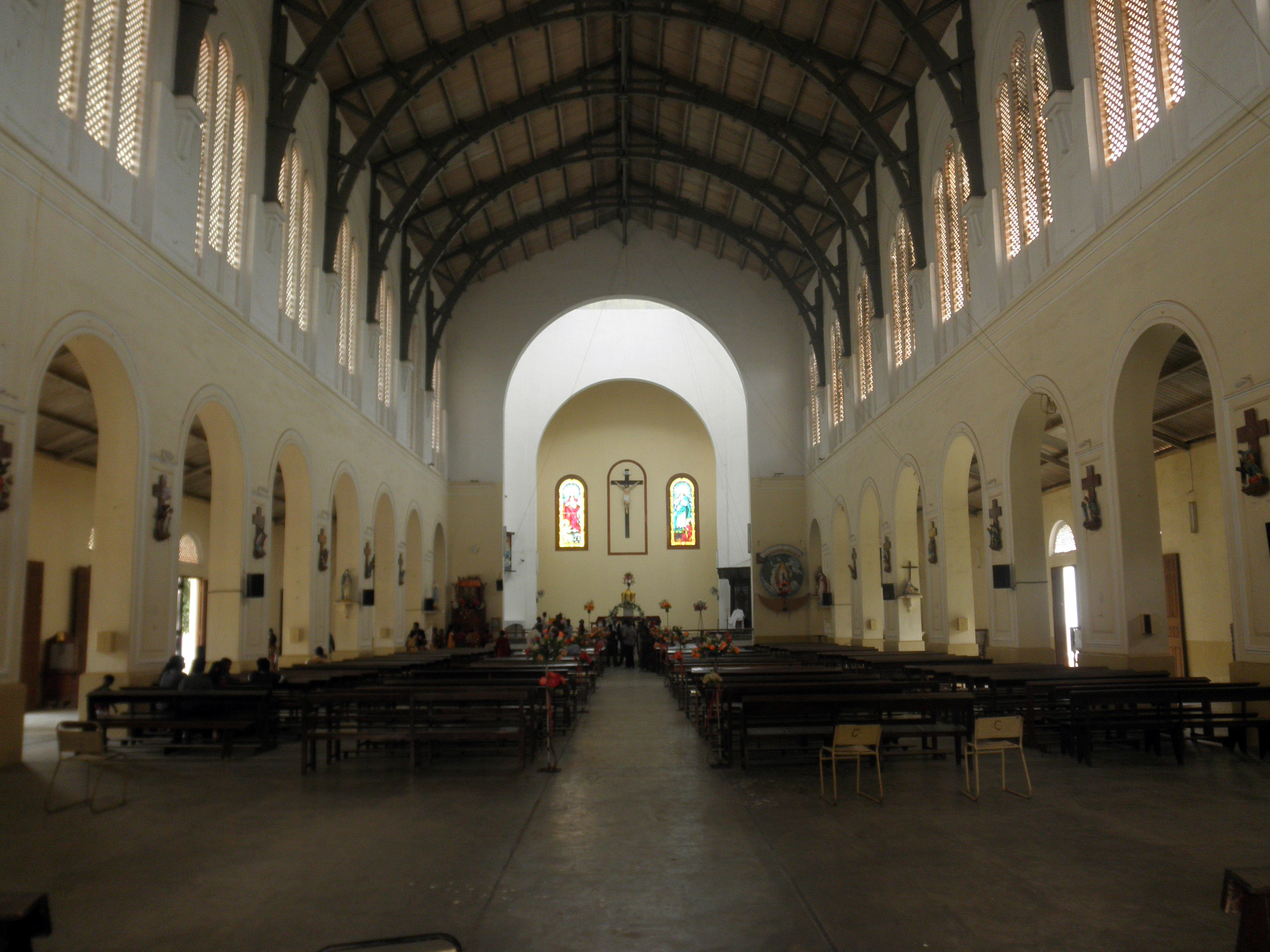
St Mary's Cathedral in Jaffna

== Catholic ==
Cathedrals of the Catholic Church in Sri Lanka:

- St. Joseph's Cathedral, Anuradhapura
- Our Lady of the Rosary Cathedral, Badulla
- Our Lady of Assumption Cathedral, Batticaloa
- Our Lady of Mount Carmel Cathedral, Chilaw
- St. Lucia's Cathedral, Colombo
- Our Lady of the Rosary Cathedral, Galle
- St. Mary's Cathedral, Jaffna
- St. Anthony's Cathedral, Kandy
- St. Anne's Cathedral, Kurunegala
- St. Sebastian's Cathedral, Mannar
- Cathedral of Sts. Peter and Paul, Ratnapura
- Our Lady of Assumption Cathedral, Trincomalee

== Anglican ==
Anglican cathedrals in Sri Lanka:

- Church of Ceylon
  - Cathedral of Christ the Living Saviour, Colombo
  - Cathedral of Christ the King, Kurunegala
- Church of South India
  - St. Thomas' Cathedral, Vaddukoddai

== See also ==
- List of cathedrals
- Christianity in Sri Lanka
