= Our Lady of the Desert Cathedral, Francistown =

Coordinates: 21.1684°S 27.5051°E

Our Lady of the Desert Cathedral
- Our Lady of the Desert Cathedral
- Location: Francistown
- Country: Botswana
- Denomination: Roman Catholic Church

The Our Lady of the Desert Cathedral is a religious building belonging to the Catholic Church and is located in the Sam Nujoma road of Francistown in the District Northeast in the eastern part of the African country of Botswana, which serves as the seat of the Bishop of the Vicariate apostolic of Francistown (Vicariatus Apostolicus Francistaunensis in Latin) was established on June 27, 1998, with the bull "Ad aptius" Pope John Paul II.

== See also ==
- Roman Catholicism in Botswana
