= Lists of Catholic church buildings =

The thousands of Catholic churches are grouped in a number of lists, mainly by country. Many more are not (yet) grouped in lists, but can be accessed through the category tree Category:Roman Catholic church buildings.

== By country ==
- List of Catholic churches in Albania
  - List of cathedrals in Albania#Roman Catholic
- List of Catholic churches in Algeria
- List of Catholic churches in Argentina
  - List of cathedrals in Argentina#Roman Catholic
- List of Catholic churches in Australia
  - List of cathedrals in Australia#Roman Catholic
- List of Catholic churches in Austria
  - List of cathedrals in Austria#Roman Catholic
- List of Catholic churches in Belarus
  - List of cathedrals in Belarus#Roman Catholic
- List of Catholic churches in Belgium
  - List of cathedrals in Belgium#Roman Catholic
- List of Catholic churches in Bolivia
  - List of cathedrals in Bolivia#Roman Catholic
- List of Catholic churches in Brazil
  - List of cathedrals in Brazil#Roman Catholic
- List of Catholic churches in Bulgaria
  - List of cathedrals in Bulgaria#Roman Catholic
- List of Catholic churches in Canada
  - List of cathedrals in Canada#Roman Catholic
  - List of Roman Catholic churches in Toronto
- List of Catholic churches in Chile
  - List of cathedrals in Chile#Roman Catholic
- List of Catholic churches in China
  - List of cathedrals in the People's Republic of China#Roman Catholic
- List of Catholic churches in Colombia
  - List of cathedrals in Colombia#Roman Catholic
- List of Catholic churches in Costa Rica
  - List of cathedrals in Costa Rica#Roman Catholic
- List of Catholic churches in Croatia
  - List of cathedrals in Croatia#Roman Catholic
- List of Catholic churches in Cyprus
- List of Catholic churches in the Czech Republic
  - List of cathedrals in the Czech Republic#Roman Catholic
- List of Catholic churches in Denmark
  - List of cathedrals in Denmark#Roman Catholic
- List of Catholic churches in Ecuador
  - List of cathedrals in Ecuador#Roman Catholic
- List of Catholic churches in El Salvador
  - List of cathedrals in El Salvador#Roman Catholic
- List of Catholic churches in Eritrea
- List of Catholic churches in Estonia
  - List of cathedrals in Estonia#Roman Catholic
- List of Catholic churches in Ethiopia
- List of Catholic churches in Finland
  - List of cathedrals in Finland#Roman Catholic
- List of Catholic churches in France
  - List of basilicas in France
  - List of cathedrals in France#Roman Catholic
- List of Catholic churches in Gabon
- List of Catholic churches in the Gambia
- List of Catholic churches in Georgia (country)
- List of Catholic churches in Germany
  - List of cathedrals in Germany#Roman Catholic
- List of Catholic churches in Ghana
  - List of cathedrals in Ghana#Roman Catholic
- List of Catholic churches in Greece
- List of Catholic churches in Guatemala
  - List of cathedrals in Guatemala#Roman Catholic
- List of Catholic churches in Guinea
- List of Catholic churches in Haiti
  - List of cathedrals in Haiti#Roman Catholic
- List of Catholic churches in Honduras
  - List of cathedrals in Honduras#Roman Catholic
- List of Catholic churches in Hong Kong
  - List of cathedrals in Hong Kong#Roman Catholic
- List of Catholic churches in Hungary
  - List of cathedrals in Hungary#Roman Catholic
- List of Catholic churches in Iceland
- List of Catholic churches in India
  - List of cathedrals in India#Roman Catholic
- List of Catholic churches in Indonesia
  - List of cathedrals in Indonesia#Roman Catholic
- List of Catholic churches in Ireland
  - List of cathedrals in Ireland#Roman Catholic
- List of Catholic churches in Italy
  - List of basilicas in Italy
  - List of cathedrals in Italy#Roman Catholic
- List of Catholic churches in Ivory Coast
  - List of cathedrals in Ivory Coast#Roman Catholic
- List of Catholic churches in Jamaica
- List of Catholic churches in Japan
  - List of cathedrals in Japan#Roman Catholic
- List of Catholic churches in Kazakhstan
  - List of cathedrals in Kazakhstan#Roman Catholic
- List of Catholic churches in Kenya
- List of Catholic churches in Latvia
  - List of cathedrals in Latvia#Roman Catholic
- List of Catholic churches in Lebanon
  - List of cathedrals in Lebanon#Roman Catholic
- List of Catholic churches in Liberia
  - List of cathedrals in Liberia#Roman Catholic
- List of Catholic churches in Lithuania
  - List of cathedrals in Lithuania#Roman Catholic
- List of Catholic churches in Luxembourg
- List of Catholic churches in the Republic of Macedonia
- List of Catholic churches in Madagascar
  - List of cathedrals in Madagascar#Roman Catholic
- List of Catholic churches in Malawi
  - List of cathedrals in Malawi#Roman Catholic
- List of Catholic churches in Malaysia
  - List of cathedrals in Malaysia#Roman Catholic
- List of Catholic churches in Mali
- List of Catholic churches in Malta
  - List of cathedrals in Malta#Roman Catholic
- List of Catholic churches in Mexico
  - List of cathedrals in Mexico#Roman Catholic
- List of Catholic churches in Moldova
- List of Catholic churches in Morocco
  - List of cathedrals in Morocco#Roman Catholic
- List of Catholic churches in Mozambique
  - List of cathedrals in Mozambique#Roman Catholic
- List of Catholic churches in Namibia
- List of Catholic churches in the Netherlands
  - List of cathedrals in the Netherlands#Roman Catholic
- List of Catholic churches in New Zealand
  - Basilicas of New Zealand
  - List of cathedrals in New Zealand#Roman Catholic
- List of Catholic churches in Nicaragua
  - List of cathedrals in Nicaragua#Roman Catholic
- List of Catholic churches in Niger
- List of Catholic churches in Nigeria
  - List of cathedrals in Nigeria#Roman Catholic
  - List of Roman Catholic churches in Port Harcourt
- List of Catholic churches in Norway
  - List of cathedrals in Norway#Roman Catholic
- List of Catholic churches in Panama
  - List of cathedrals in Panama#Roman Catholic
- List of Catholic churches in Paraguay
  - List of cathedrals in Paraguay#Roman Catholic
- List of Catholic churches in Peru
  - List of cathedrals in Peru#Roman Catholic
- List of Catholic churches in the Philippines
  - List of cathedrals in the Philippines#Roman Catholic
- List of Catholic churches in Poland
  - List of cathedrals in Poland#Roman Catholic
- List of Catholic churches in Portugal
  - List of cathedrals in Portugal#Roman Catholic
- List of Catholic churches in Puerto Rico
- List of Catholic churches in Romania
  - List of cathedrals in Romania#Roman Catholic
- List of Catholic churches in Russia
  - List of cathedrals in Russia#Roman Catholic
- List of Catholic churches in Senegal
  - List of cathedrals in Senegal#Roman Catholic
- List of Catholic churches in Serbia
  - List of cathedrals in Serbia#Roman Catholic
- List of Roman Catholic churches in Singapore
- List of Catholic churches in Slovakia
  - List of cathedrals in Slovakia#Roman Catholic
- List of Catholic churches in Slovenia
  - List of cathedrals in Slovenia#Roman Catholic
- List of Catholic churches in South Africa
  - List of cathedrals in South Africa#Roman Catholic
- List of Catholic churches in Spain
  - List of cathedrals in Spain#List of Roman Catholic Cathedrals
- List of Catholic churches in Sri Lanka
  - List of cathedrals in Sri Lanka#Roman Catholic
- List of Catholic churches in Sudan
- List of Catholic churches in Suriname
- List of Catholic churches in Sweden
  - List of cathedrals in Sweden#Roman Catholic
- List of Catholic churches in Switzerland
  - List of cathedrals in Switzerland#Roman Catholic
- List of Catholic churches in Taiwan
  - List of cathedrals in Taiwan#Roman Catholic
- List of Catholic churches in Tajikistan
- List of Catholic churches in Tanzania
  - List of cathedrals in Tanzania#Roman Catholic
- List of Catholic churches in Thailand
  - List of cathedrals in Thailand#Roman Catholic
- List of Catholic churches in Togo
- List of Catholic churches in Tunisia
- List of Catholic churches in Turkey
- List of Catholic churches in Turkmenistan
- List of Catholic churches in Uganda
- List of Catholic churches in Ukraine
  - List of cathedrals in Ukraine#Roman Catholic
- List of Catholic churches in the United Kingdom
  - Catholic churches in Leicester
  - List of cathedrals in the United Kingdom#Roman Catholic
- List of Catholic churches in the United States
  - List of the Catholic cathedrals of the United States
  - List of Roman Catholic churches in the Archdiocese of Atlanta
  - List of Roman Catholic churches in the Diocese of Charleston
  - List of parishes of the Roman Catholic Diocese of Honolulu
  - List of churches in the Roman Catholic Archdiocese of New York
  - Catholic churches in Vermont
- List of Catholic churches in Uruguay
  - List of cathedrals in Uruguay#Roman Catholic
- List of Catholic churches in Venezuela
  - List of cathedrals in Venezuela#Roman Catholic
- List of Catholic churches in Zambia
  - List of cathedrals in Zambia#Roman Catholic
- List of Catholic churches in Zimbabwe
  - List of cathedrals in Zimbabwe#Roman Catholic

== By type ==
- List of basilicas
- Lists of cathedrals (also contains non-Catholic cathedrals)
