= Cathedral of Our Lady of the Rosary =

Cathedral of Our Lady of the Rosary, or variants, may refer to:

- Our Lady of the Rosary Cathedral, Azul, Argentina
- Our Lady of Rosary Cathedral, Cafayate, Argentina
- Corrientes Cathedral (Our Lady of the Rosary Cathedral), Argentina
- Paraná Cathedral (Our Lady of the Rosary Cathedral), Argentina
- Cathedral Basilica of Our Lady of the Rosary, Rosario, Santa Fe, Argentina
- Our Lady of the Rosary Cathedral, Waitara, New South Wales, Australia
- Our Lady of the Holy Rosary Cathedral, Chittagong, Bangladesh
- Our Lady of the Rosary Cathedral, Itabira, Brazil
- Our Lady of the Rosary Cathedral, Santos, Brazil
- Our Lady of the Rosary Cathedral, Copiapó, Chile
- Our Lady of the Rosary Cathedral, Valdivia, Chile
- Cathedral Basilica of Our Lady of the Rosary, Manizales, Colombia
- Our Lady of the Rosary Cathedral, Girardota, Colombia
- Our Lady of the Rosary Cathedral, Kisangani, Democratic Republic of the Congo
- Cathedral of Our Lady of the Rosary, Barahona, cathedral of the Diocese of Barahona, Dominican Republic
- Our Lady of the Rosary Cathedral, Puyo, Ecuador
- Our Lady of the Rosary Cathedral, of the Diocese of Baroda, India
- Our Lady of the Rosary Cathedral, Jashpur, India
- Our Lady of Rosary Cathedral, Mangalore, India
- Culiacán Cathedral (Cathedral Basilica of Our Lady of the Rosary), Mexico
- Our Lady of the Rosary Cathedral, Beira, Mozambique
- Cathedral of Our Lady of the Rosary, of the Diocese of Bluefields, Nicaragua
- Our Lady of the Most Holy Rosary Cathedral, Estelí, Nicaragua
- Tacna Cathedral (Our Lady of the Rosary Cathedral), Peru
- Dipolog Cathedral (Our Lady of the Holy Rosary Cathedral Parish), Philippines
- Naval Cathedral (Biliran) (Our Lady of the Holy Rosary Cathedral), Philippines
- Our Lady of the Rosary Cathedral (San Bernardino, California), United States
- Cathedral of Our Lady of the Rosary (Duluth, Minnesota), United States
- Rosary Cathedral (Toledo, Ohio) (Our Lady, Queen of the Most Holy Rosary Cathedral), United States
- Our Lady of the Rosary Cathedral, Cabimas, Venezuela

== See also ==
- Holy Rosary Cathedral (disambiguation)
- Holy Rosary Church (disambiguation)
- St. Mary's Cathedral, Galle (Cathedral of St. Mary, Queen of the Holy Rosary), Sri Lanka
