= St. Philip's Cathedral =

St. Philip's Cathedral may refer to:

- St. Philip's Cathedral, San Felipe, Chile
- St. Philip the Apostle Cathedral, Puerto Plata, Dominican Republic
- St Philip's Cathedral, Birmingham, England
- Cathedral of St. Philip the Apostle (Arecibo, Puerto Rico)
- Episcopal Cathedral of Saint Philip (Atlanta, Georgia), United States
- St. Philip the Apostle Cathedral, San Felipe, Venezuela
