= List of cathedrals in Chile =

This is the list of cathedrals in Chile sorted by denomination.

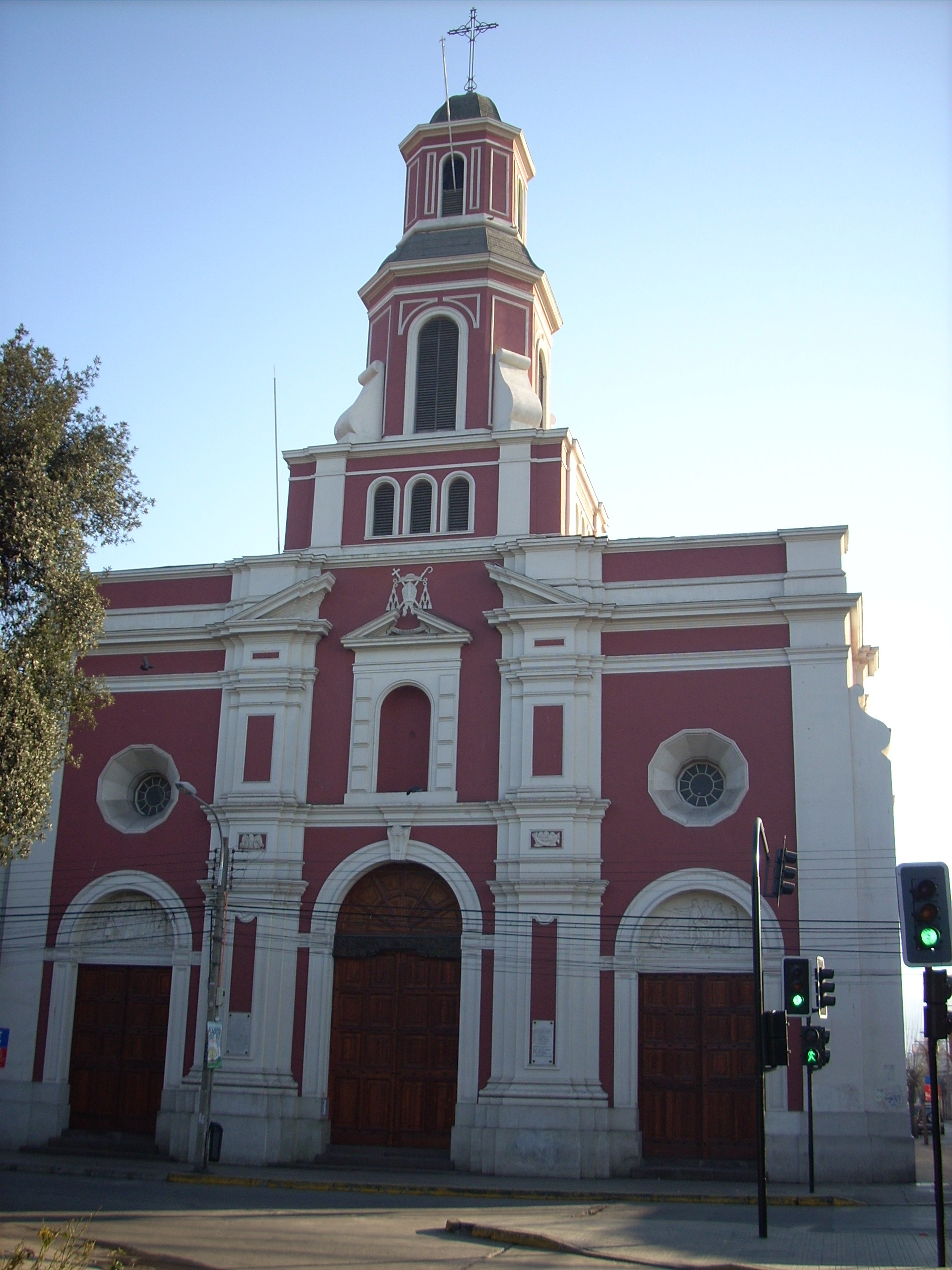
Cathedral of St. Philip in San Felipe

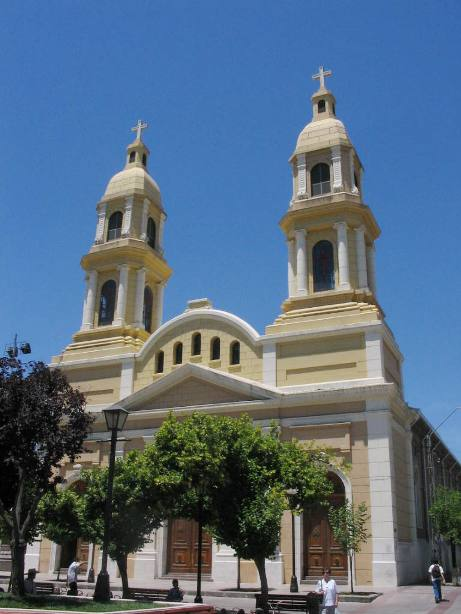
Catedral El Sagrario in Rancagua

== Catholic ==
Cathedrals of the Catholic Church in Chile:

- Cathedral of St. Joseph in Antofagasta
- Cathedral of St. Mark in Arica
- St. John the Baptist Cathedral, Calama
- Cathedral of Our Lady of Sorrows in Coyhaique
- Cathedral of St. Bartholomew in Chillán
- Cathedral of the Immaculate Conception in Concepción
- Cathedral of Our Lady of the Rosary in Copiapó
- Cathedral of St. Raphael in Illapel
- Cathedral of the Immaculate Conception in Iquique
- Cathedral of Our Lady of Mercy in La Serena
- Cathedral of St. Ambrose in Linares
- Cathedral of St. Joseph in Melipilla
- Military Cathedral of Our Lady of Mount Carmel in Santiago
- Cathedral of St. Matthew in Osorno
- Cathedral of Our Lady of Mount Carmel in Puerto Montt
- Cathedral of the Sacred Heart in Punta Arenas
- Catedral El Sagrario in Rancagua
- Cathedral of St. Bernard in San Bernardo
- Cathedral of Our Lady of the Rosary in Ancud
- Cathedral of St. Philip in San Felipe
- Cathedral of St. John the Baptist in Calama
- Cathedral of St. Mary of the Angels in Los Ángeles
- Cathedral of St. James in Santiago
- Cathedral of St. Augustine in Talca
- Cathedral of St. Joseph in Temuco
- Cathedral of Our Lady of the Rosary in Valdivia
- Cathedral of St. James in Valparaíso
- Cathedral of the Sacred Heart in Villarrica

== Eastern Orthodox ==
Cathedrals of the Greek Orthodox Church of Antioch:

- St. George Cathedral in Santiago

== Anglican ==
Cathedrals of the Anglican Church of Chile:

- St. Paul's Cathedral (Valparaíso)

== See also ==
- List of cathedrals
