= Cathedral de San Felipe Apostol =

Cathedral de San Felipe Apostol may refer to:

Dominican Republic

- St. Philip the Apostle Cathedral, Puerto Plata

Puerto Rico

- Catedral de San Felipe Apóstol (Arecibo, Puerto Rico)

Venezuela

- St. Philip the Apostle Cathedral, San Felipe
