= Holy Rosary Cathedral =

Holy Rosary Cathedral can refer to:

- Holy Rosary Cathedral (Vancouver) (Metropolitan Cathedral of Our Lady of the Holy Rosary), Canada
- Holy Rosary Cathedral (Regina, Saskatchewan), Canada
- Queen of the Most Holy Rosary Cathedral, Willemstad, Curaçao
- Holy Rosary Cathedral, Kolkata, India
- Holy Rosary Cathedral, Semarang, Indonesia
- Holy Rosary Cathedral, Kaohsiung, Taiwan
- Rosary Cathedral (Toledo, Ohio), United States

== See also ==
- Cathedral of Our Lady of the Rosary (disambiguation)
