= St. Philip the Apostle Cathedral, Puerto Plata =

Coordinates: 19.79727°N 70.69359°W

St. Philip the Apostle Cathedral
- Puerto Plata Cathedral
- Catedral de San Felipe Apóstol
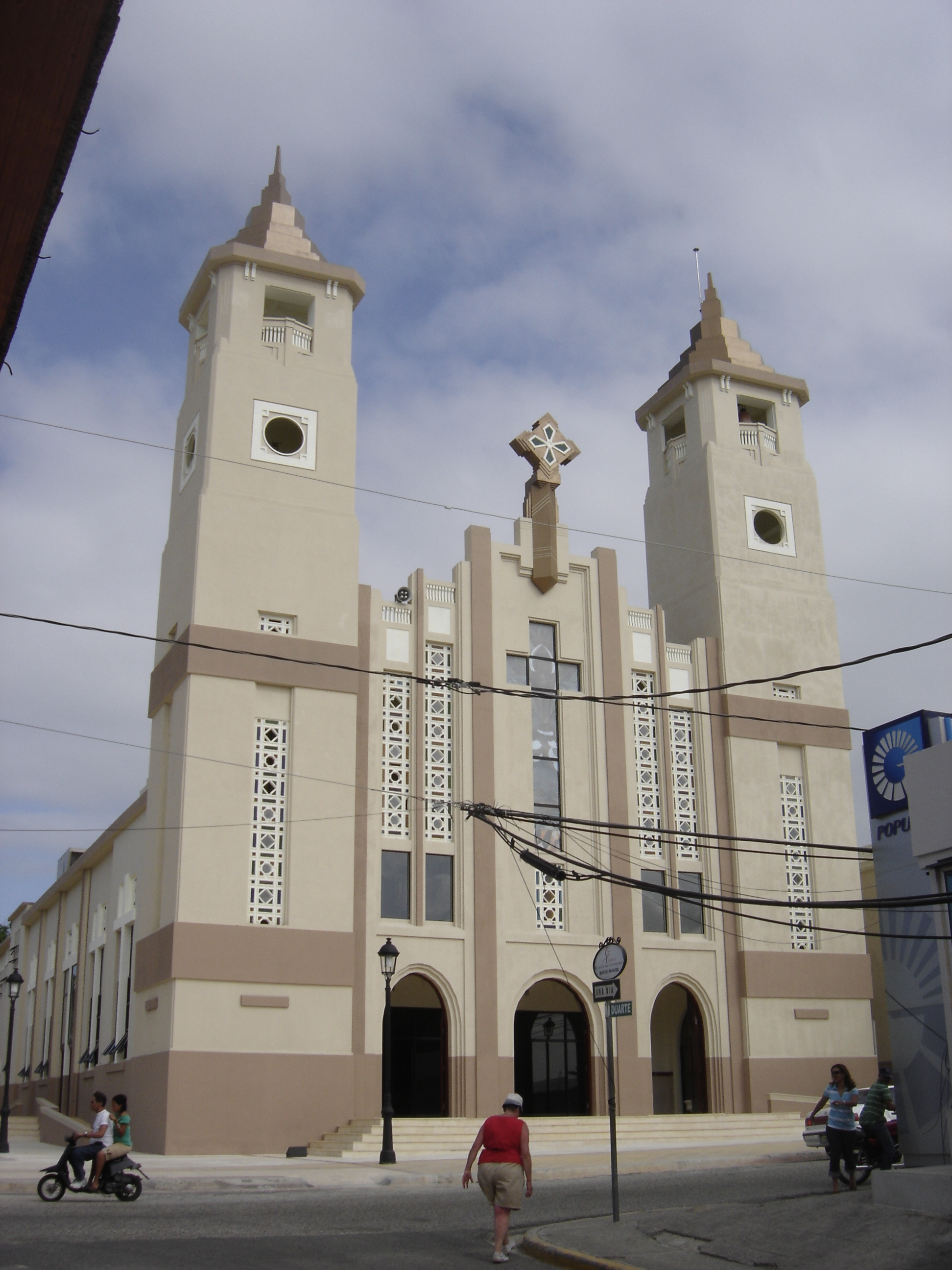
- St. Philip the Apostle Cathedral
- Location: Puerto Plata
- Country: Dominican Republic
- Denomination: Roman Catholic Church
- Tradition: Roman Rite

History
- Status: Cathedral
- Founded: before 1863

Architecture
- Functional status: Active
- Completed: 1956

Administration
- Province: Puerto Plata Province
- Diocese: Diocese of Puerto Plata

Clergy
- Bishop: Julio César Corniel Amaro

The Cathedral of St. Philip the Apostle in Puerto Plata (Spanish: Catedral de San Felipe Apóstol) Also known as Puerto Plata Cathedral, and as St. Philip the Apostle Cathedral is a cathedral of the Catholic Church that is located in Calle José del Carmen Ariza 36 of the city of Puerto Plata part of the province of the same name to the north of the island of Hispaniola and the Caribbean country of the Dominican Republic, It should not be confused with other cathedrals of the same name (San Felipe Apóstol) in Chile, Puerto Rico and Venezuela.

The earlier wooden church was destroyed by a fire in 1863 during the "Dominican War of Restoration" (Guerra de Restauración). Construction of the present church began in 1870 under Pedro Tomás de Mena. Reconstruction of the church began in 1929 and was completed in 1956. The reconstruction took longer than expected due to an earthquake in 1946. In 2003 yet another earthquake damaged the structure, which was fully repaired by 2008.

The cathedral, built in a modern Victorian style, and is the mother (or main church) of the Diocese of Puerto Plata (Dioecesis Portus Argentarii) which was created by the then Pope John Paul II in 1996 through the papal bull "Venerabilis Frater" from territory formerly belonging to the Roman Catholic Archdiocese of Santiago de los Caballeros.

It is under the pastoral responsibility of Bishop Julio César Corniel Amaro.

== See also ==
- Roman Catholicism in the Dominican Republic
- St. Philip the Apostle

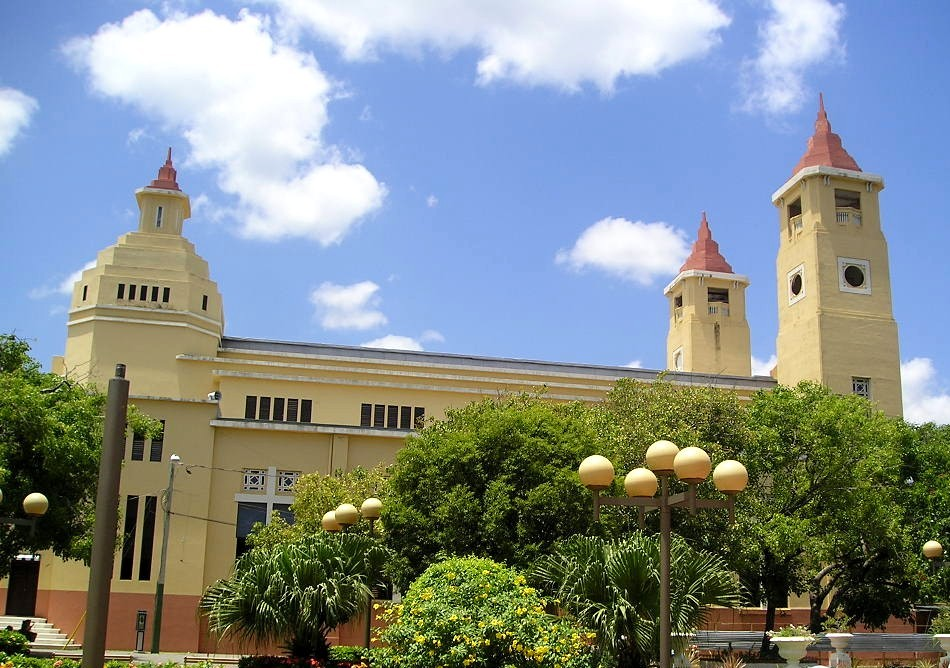
Another View
