= List of Catholic churches in Bolivia =

This is a list of Catholic churches in Bolivia.

== Cathedrals ==
See: List of cathedrals in Bolivia

- Sucre Cathedral

== Basilicas ==
- Basilica of Our Lady of Copacabana

== See also ==
- List of Roman Catholic dioceses in Bolivia
