= List of cathedrals in Lithuania =

This is the list of cathedrals in Lithuania sorted by denomination.

== Catholic ==
Cathedrals of the Catholic Church in Lithuania:

Cathedral	City	Diocese	Coordinates	Image
Cathedral Basilica of Sts. Stanislaus and Vladislaus	Vilnius	Archdiocese of Vilnius	54°41′09″N 25°17′16″E	
Cathedral of Sts. Peter and Paul	Kaunas	Archdiocese of Kaunas	54°53′49″N 23°53′20″E	
Cathedral of Christ's Transfiguration	Kaišiadorys	Diocese of Kaišiadorys	54°51′38″N 24°27′26″E	
Cathedral of Christ the King	Panevėžys	Diocese of Panevėžys	55°43′22″N 24°21′32″E	
Cathedral of Sts. Peter and Paul	Šiauliai	Diocese of Šiauliai	55°56′57″N 23°19′11″E	
Cathedral of St. Anthony of Padua	Telšiai	Diocese of Telšiai	55°58′56″N 22°14′47″E	
Cathedral of the Blessed Virgin Mary	Vilkaviškis	Diocese of Vilkaviškis	54°38′53″N 23°2′13″E	
Cathedral of St. Ignatius	Vilnius	Military Ordinariate of Lithuania	54°40′58″N 25°16′55″E	

== Eastern Orthodox ==
Cathedrals of the Russian Orthodox Church:

Cathedral	City	Diocese	Coordinates	Image
Cathedral of the Theotokos	Vilnius	Vilnius and Lithuanian Diocese	54°40′52″N 25°17′31″E	

== See also ==
- List of cathedrals
- List of cathedrals in Estonia
- List of cathedrals in Latvia
- List of cathedrals in Poland
