= List of Catholic churches in Chile =

This is a list of Catholic churches in Chile.

== Cathedrals ==
See: List of cathedrals in Chile#Roman Catholic

- Cathedral of the Most Holy Conception, Chile
- Metropolitan Cathedral of Santiago
- Sagrario Cathedral

== Basilicas ==
- Basilica de la Merced
- Basílica de los Sacramentinos
- Basilica of Lourdes, Santiago
- Basílica de Nuestra Señora del Perpetuo Socorro

== Other churches ==
- Church of San Juan Bautista, Dalcahue
- Church of Santa María de Loreto, Achao
- Iglesia de la Divina Providencia
- Iglesia de la Matriz
- Iglesia San Agustín, Chile
- Parroquia de Santa Filomena
- San Francisco Church, Santiago de Chile
- San Francisco Church, Valparaíso
- Santo Domingo Church, Santiago de Chile

== See also ==
- List of Roman Catholic dioceses in Chile
- Roman Catholicism in Chile
- Churches of Chiloé
