= Diocese of Puerto Plata =

Roman Catholic diocese in the Dominican Republic

Diocese of Puerto Plata Dioecesis Portus Argentarii Diócesis de Puerto Plata
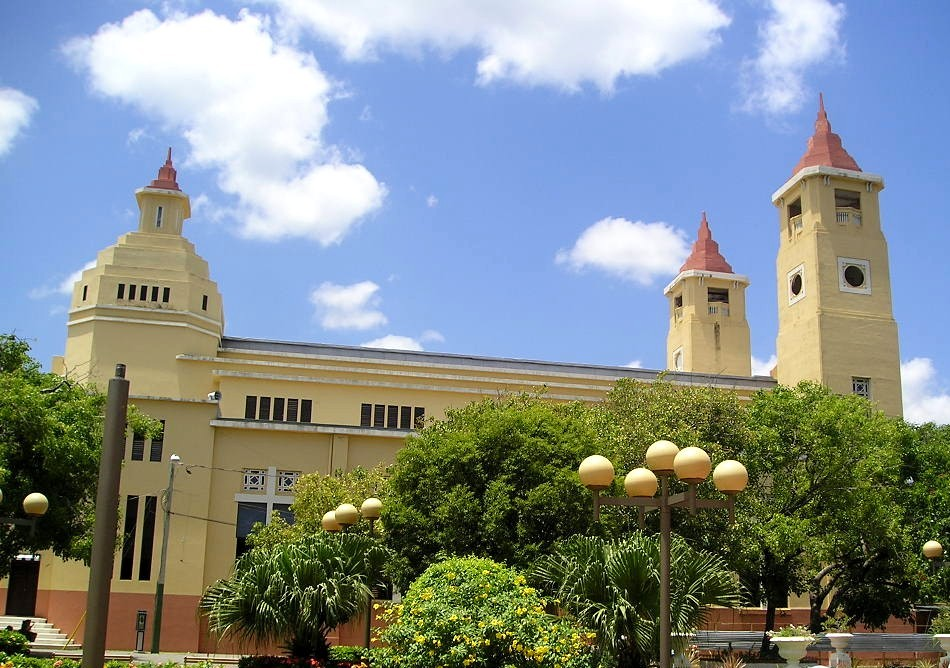
- Catedral San Felipe Apóstol

Location
- Country: Dominican Republic
- Territory: Puerto Plata Province
- Ecclesiastical province: Province of Santiago de los Caballeros
- Metropolitan: Puerto Plata

Statistics
- Area: 2,700 km^{2} (1,000 sq mi)
- Population: Total; Catholics: (as of 2004); 346,520; 338,560 (97.7%)
- Parishes: 31

Information
- Denomination: Roman Catholic
- Rite: Roman Rite
- Established: 16 December 1996 (28 years ago)
- Cathedral: Cathedral of St. Philip the Apostle

Current leadership
- Pope: Leo XIV
- Bishop: Julio César Corniel Amaro
- Metropolitan Archbishop: Freddy Antonio de Jesús Bretón Martínez; Archbishop of Santiago de los Caballeros
- Bishops emeritus: Gregorio Nicanor Peña Rodríguez (1996-2004)

Map

The Roman Catholic Diocese of Puerto Plata (Latin: Dioecesis Portus Argentarii) (erected 16 December 1996) is a suffragan diocese of the Archdiocese of Santiago de los Caballeros. The diocese is located in the province of Puerto Plata, in the northern section of the Dominican Republic. The cathedral of the diocese is the Cathedral of St. Philip the Apostle, which is located in the city of San Felipe de Puerto Plata,

== Bishops ==
=== Ordinaries (Bishops of the Diocese) ===
- Gregorio Nicanor Peña Rodríguez (1996 - 2004), appointed Bishop of Nuestra Señora de la Altagracia en Higüey
- Julio César Corniel Amaro (2005 - )

=== Other priest of this diocese who became bishop ===
- Santiago Rodríguez Rodríguez, appointed Bishop of San Pedro de Macorís in 2017

== External links and references ==
- "Diocese of Puerto Plata". Catholic-Hierarchy.
