= St. Joseph's Cathedral, Melipilla =

Coordinates: 33.6851°S 71.2156°W

St. Joseph's Cathedral
- Catedral de San José
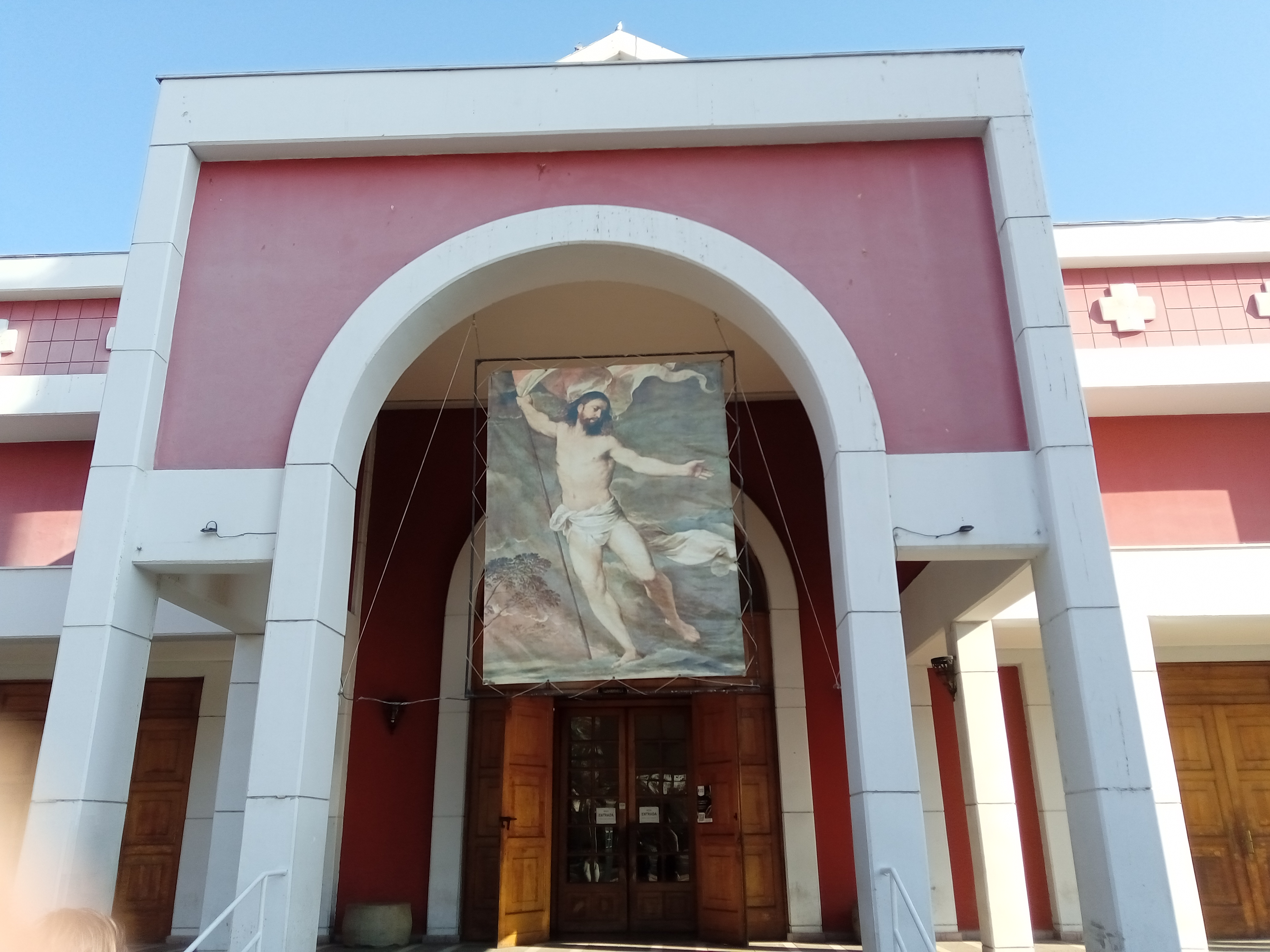
- St. Joseph's Cathedral
- Location: Melipilla
- Country: Chile
- Denomination: Roman Catholic Church

The Cathedral of St. Joseph (Spanish: Catedral San José) or Melipilla Cathedral, located in Melipilla, Santiago, Chile, is the cathedral church of the Roman Catholic Diocese of Melipilla.

The current structure replaced an earlier 18th-century building that was destroyed in the 1985 Algarrobo earthquake. It was elevated to cathedral status with the erection of the diocese by Pope John Paul II in 1991, and dedicated on April 30, 1992.

== See also ==
- Catholic Church in Chile
