= List of Catholic churches in Argentina =

This is a list of Catholic churches in Argentina.

== Cathedrals ==
See: List of cathedrals in Argentina

- Buenos Aires Metropolitan Cathedral
- Cathedral of La Plata
- Córdoba Cathedral, Argentina
- Cathedral Basilica of Our Lady of the Rosary
- San Isidro Cathedral

== See also ==
- List of Roman Catholic dioceses in Argentina
