= List of Catholic churches in Bulgaria =

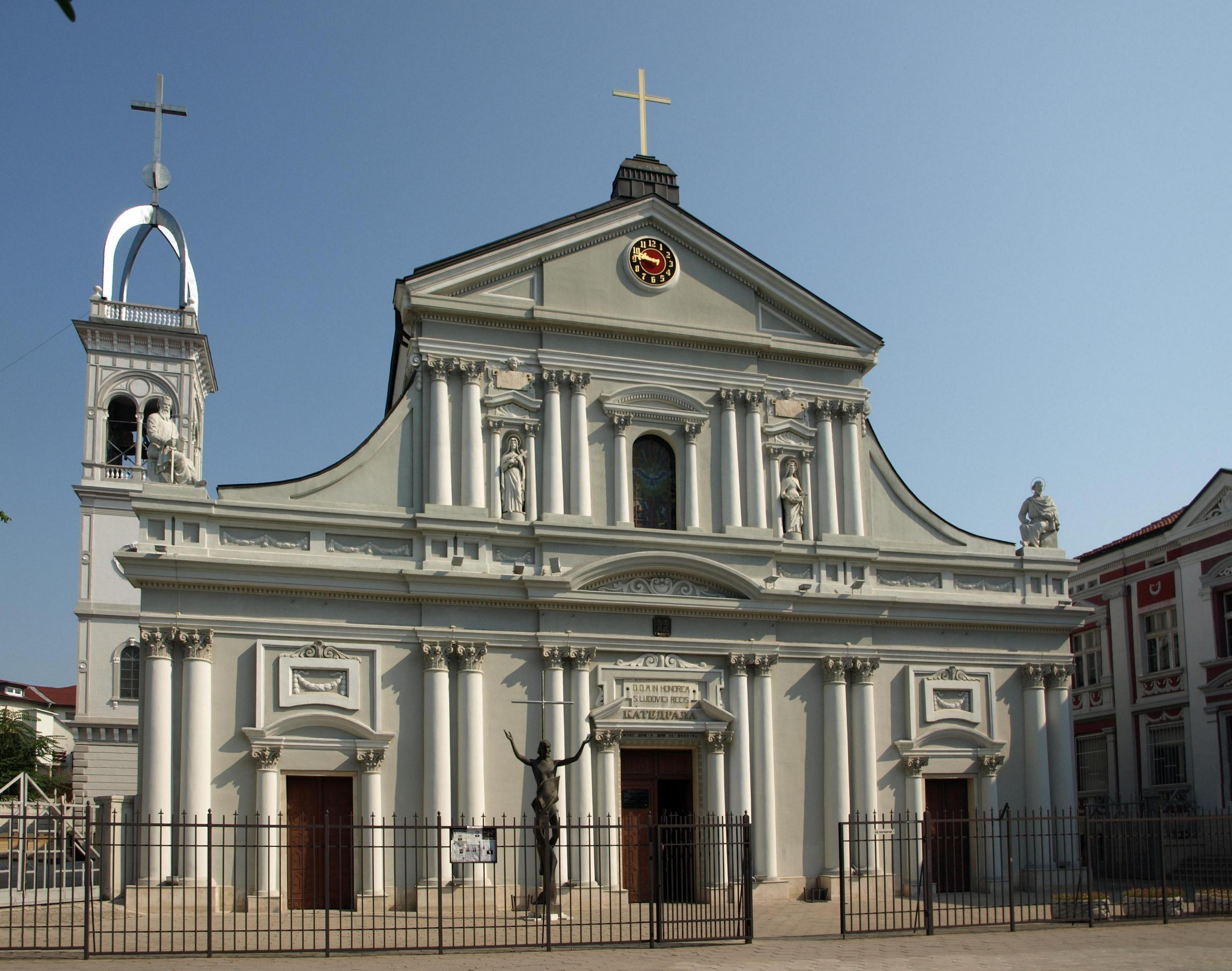
The Cathedral of St Louis in Plovdiv

This is a list of Catholic churches in Bulgaria.

== Cathedrals ==
- Cathedral of St Joseph, Sofia
- Cathedral of St Louis (Plovdiv)
- St Paul of the Cross Cathedral

== Other churches ==
- Christ the Savior Church, Vidin

== See also ==
- Bulgarian Greek Catholic Church
