= List of cathedrals in Morocco =

This is the list of cathedrals in Morocco sorted by denomination.

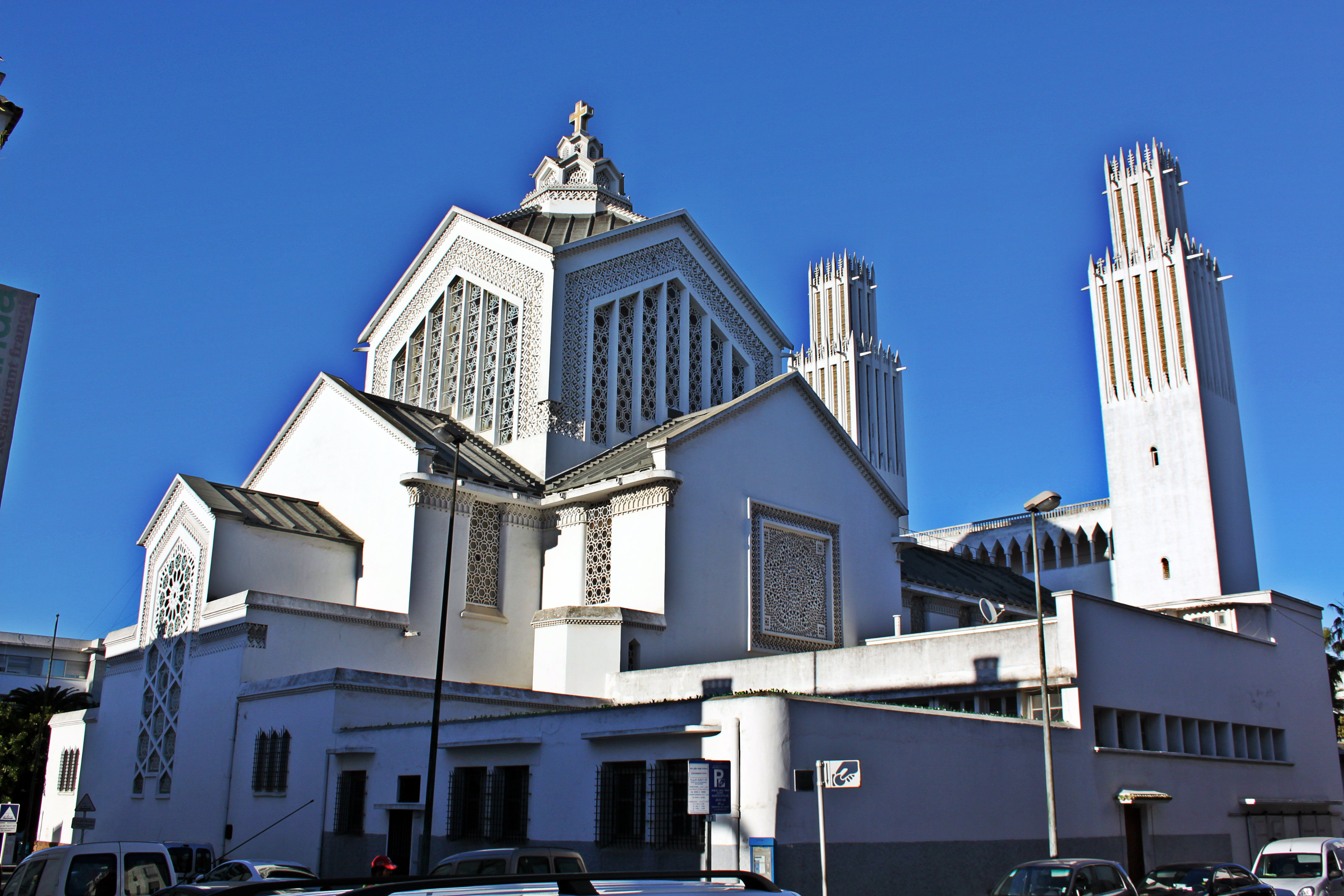
St. Peter's Cathedral in Rabat

== Catholic ==
Cathedrals of the Catholic Church in Morocco:

- St. Peter's Cathedral, Rabat
- Roman Catholic Cathedral of Tangier
- The former Casablanca Cathedral

== See also ==
- List of cathedrals
- Christianity in Morocco
