= Our Lady of the Rosary Cathedral, Azul =

Coordinates: 36.7777°S 59.8642°W

Our Lady of the Rosary Cathedral
- Catedral de Nuestra Señora del Rosario
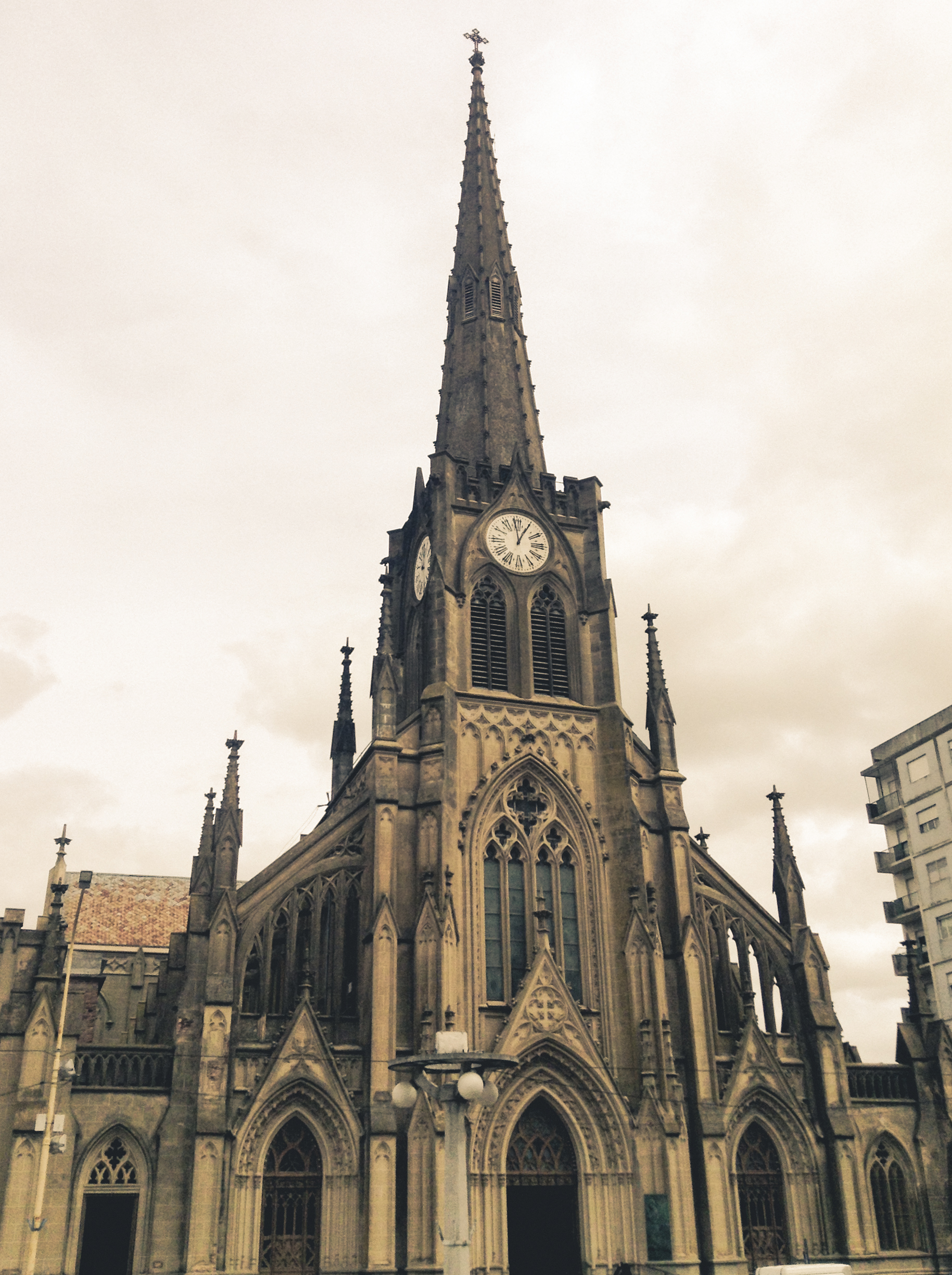
- Our Lady of the Rosary Cathedral
- Location: Azul
- Country: Argentina
- Denomination: Roman Catholic Church

The Our Lady of the Rosary Cathedral (Spanish: Catedral de Nuestra Señora del Rosario), also called Azul Cathedral, is a Catholic church built in Gothic style, inaugurated on October 7, 1906, and is located in the city of Azul, in the center of the province of Buenos Aires in the South American country of Argentina.

It was designed by engineers Juan Ochoa, W. Pitman and Charles Evans Medhurst. Located on San Martin Street 411 esq. Colón.

Highlights the impressive bells and luminous stained glass brought from France in the early twentieth century and the main altar an image of Our Lady of the Rosary, patroness of the city is located.

In 1934 the Roman Catholic Diocese of Azul was created, and the city became head of the bishopric. The creation was made by the papal bull "Nobilis argentinae Nationis Ecclesia", Pope Pius XI. It includes the parties of Ayacucho, Blue, Benito Juarez, Bolivar, General Alvear, General Lamadrid, Laprida, Las Flores, Olavarría, Rauch, Roque Perez, Saladillo, Tandil and Tapalqué. The first bishop was Mons. César Antonio Cáneva.

== See also ==
- Roman Catholicism in Argentina
- Our Lady of the Rosary

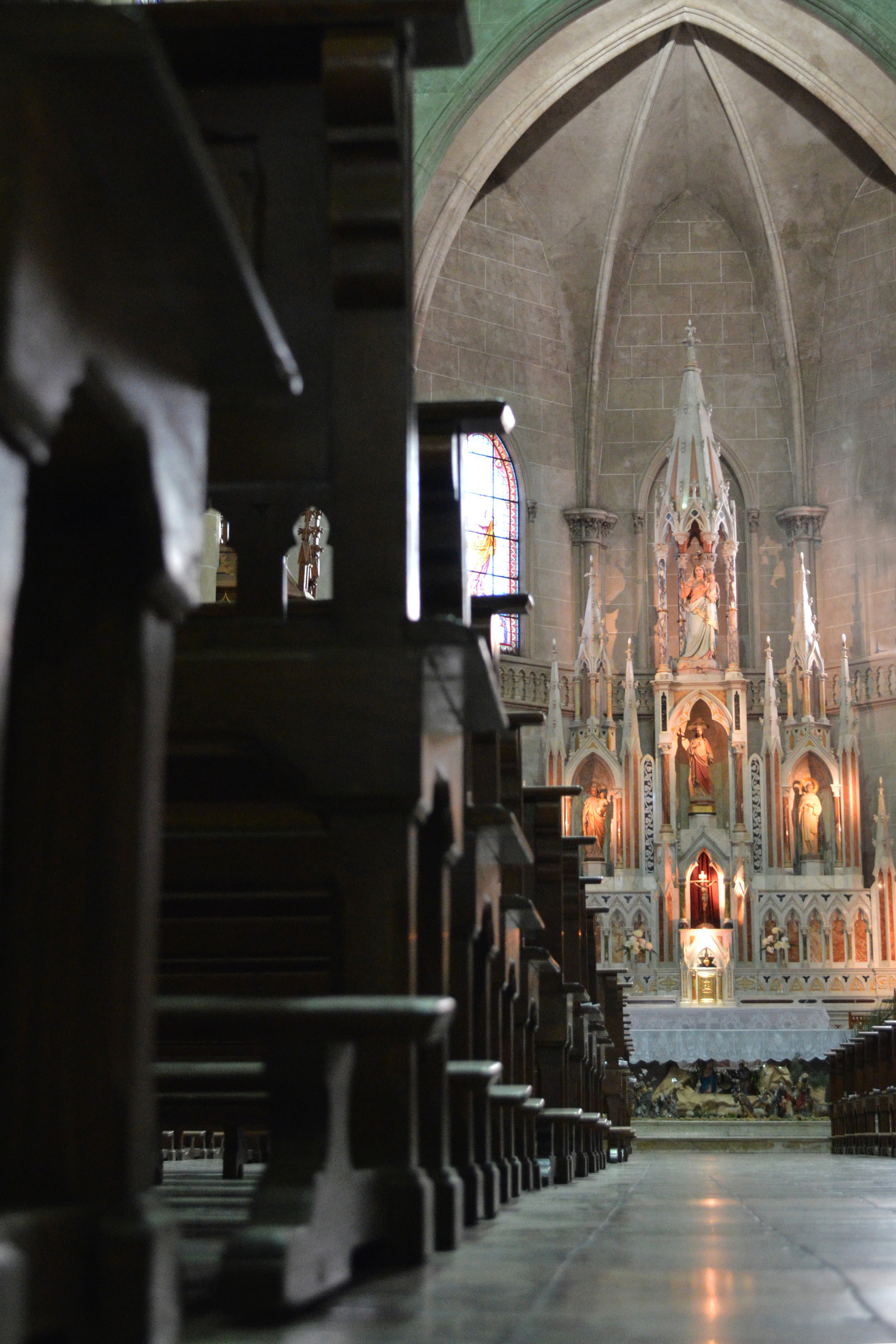
Internal view
