= St. Joseph's Cathedral, Antofagasta =

Coordinates: 23.6472°S 70.3974°W

St. Joseph's Cathedral
- Catedral de Antofagasta
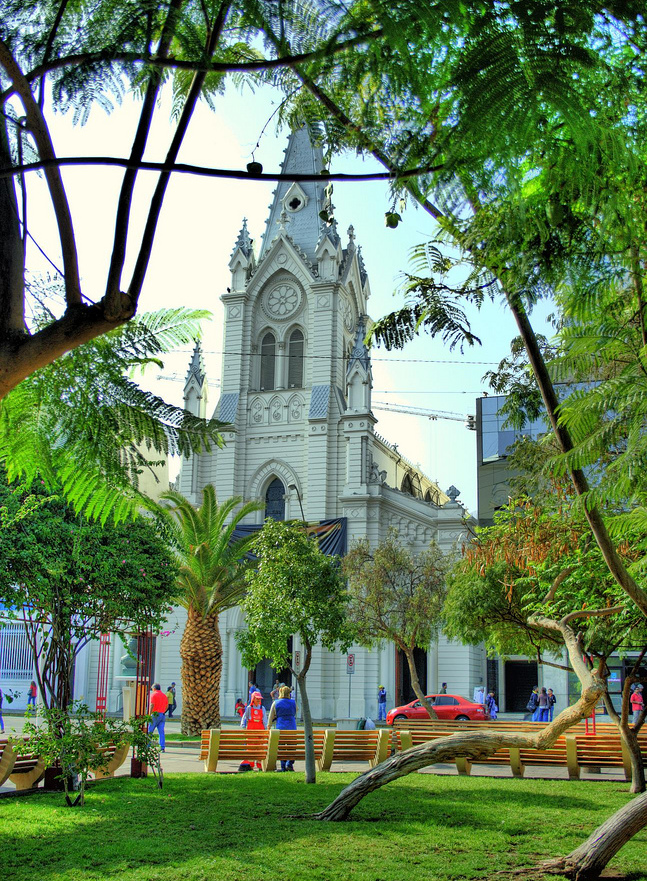
- St. Joseph's Cathedral
- Location: Antofagasta
- Country: Chile
- Denomination: Roman Catholic Church

The St. Joseph's Cathedral (Spanish: Catedral de Antofagasta) also called Antofagasta Cathedral It is a religious building of the Catholic Church located in the city of Antofagasta, northern Chile, opposite the Colón square, along San Martin Street.It is neo-Gothic style and has beautiful stained glass windows inside, was built between 1907 and 1917.

Its first version, built in 1872, was laurel tables. Two small bells and a triangle of steel placed on a pole protruding (4 to 5 meters high) were the belfry. He was devoured by fire in December 1880.

The first stone of this building was laid on November 15, 1907, an event that was attended by the ecclesiastical authorities of the time. The work of neo-Gothic style, was made by the architect Emile Doyer. The present cathedral was completed on September 17, 1917, although its symbolic inauguration had occurred in 1914.

== See also ==
- Roman Catholicism in Chile
- St. Joseph's Cathedral (disambiguation)
