= Our Lady of the Most Holy Rosary Cathedral, Estelí =

Coordinates: 13.09294°N 86.35546°W

Our Lady of the Most Holy Rosary Cathedral
- Catedral Nuestra Señora del Santísimo Rosario
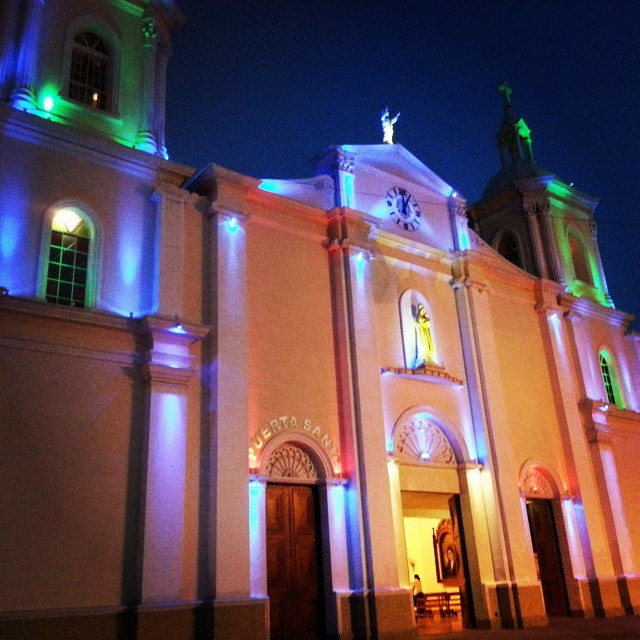
- Our Lady of the Most Holy Rosary Cathedral
- Location: Estelí
- Country: Nicaragua
- Denomination: Roman Catholic Church

The Our Lady of the Most Holy Rosary Cathedral (Spanish: Catedral Nuestra Señora del Santísimo Rosario), also called Estelí Cathedral, is a cathedral of the Catholic Church in the city of Estelí, that serves as the seat of the Diocese of Estelí in Nicaragua. It is dedicated to the Marian devotion of Our Lady of the Rosary, patroness of the Diocese, and has a neoclassic and modern style. It was consecrated as the seat of the diocese on December 17, 1962 by Pope John XXIII.

== See also ==
- Roman Catholicism in Nicaragua
- Our Lady of Rosary

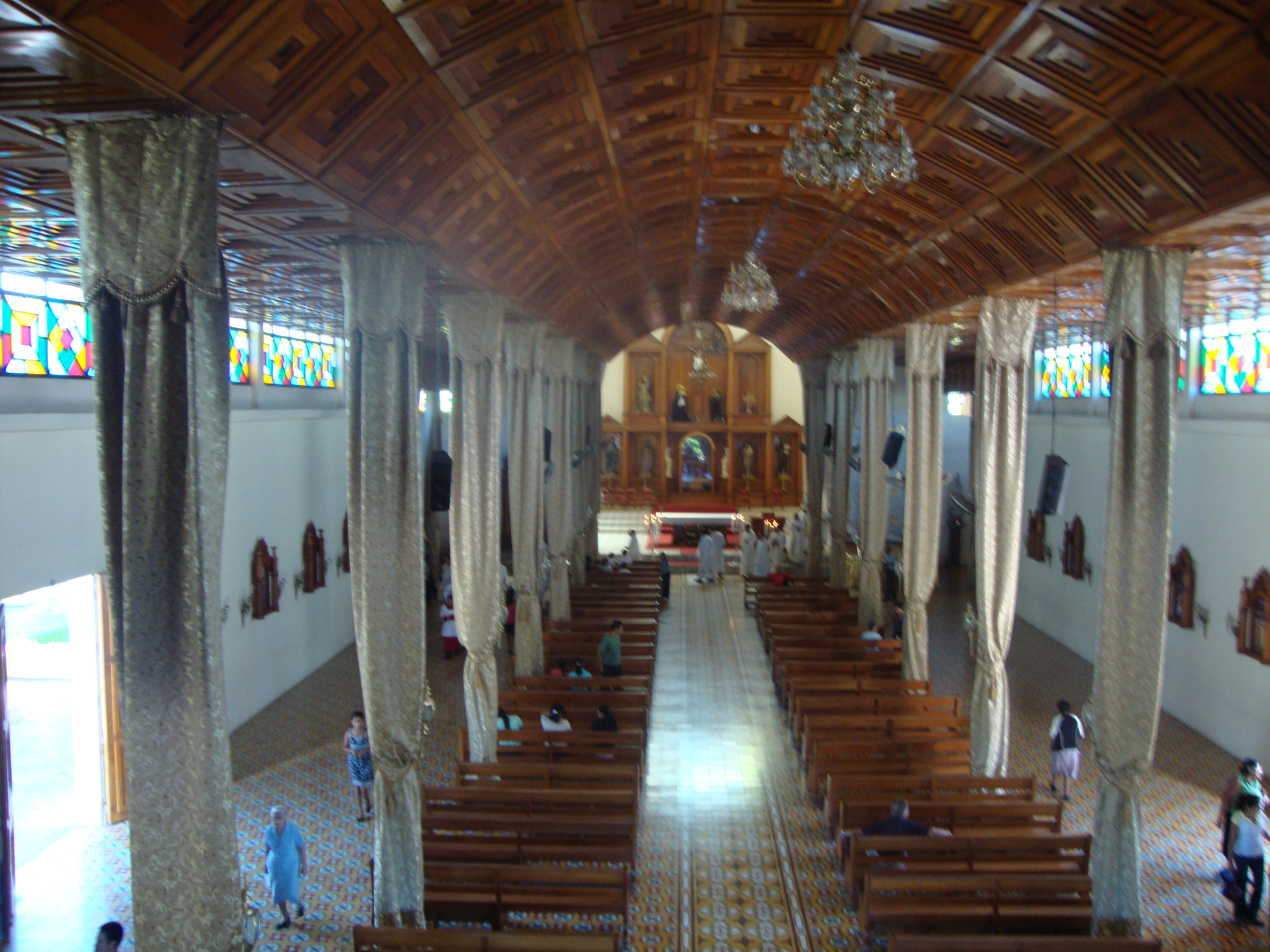
internal view
