= List of cathedrals in Tanzania =

This is the list of cathedrals in Tanzania sorted by denomination.

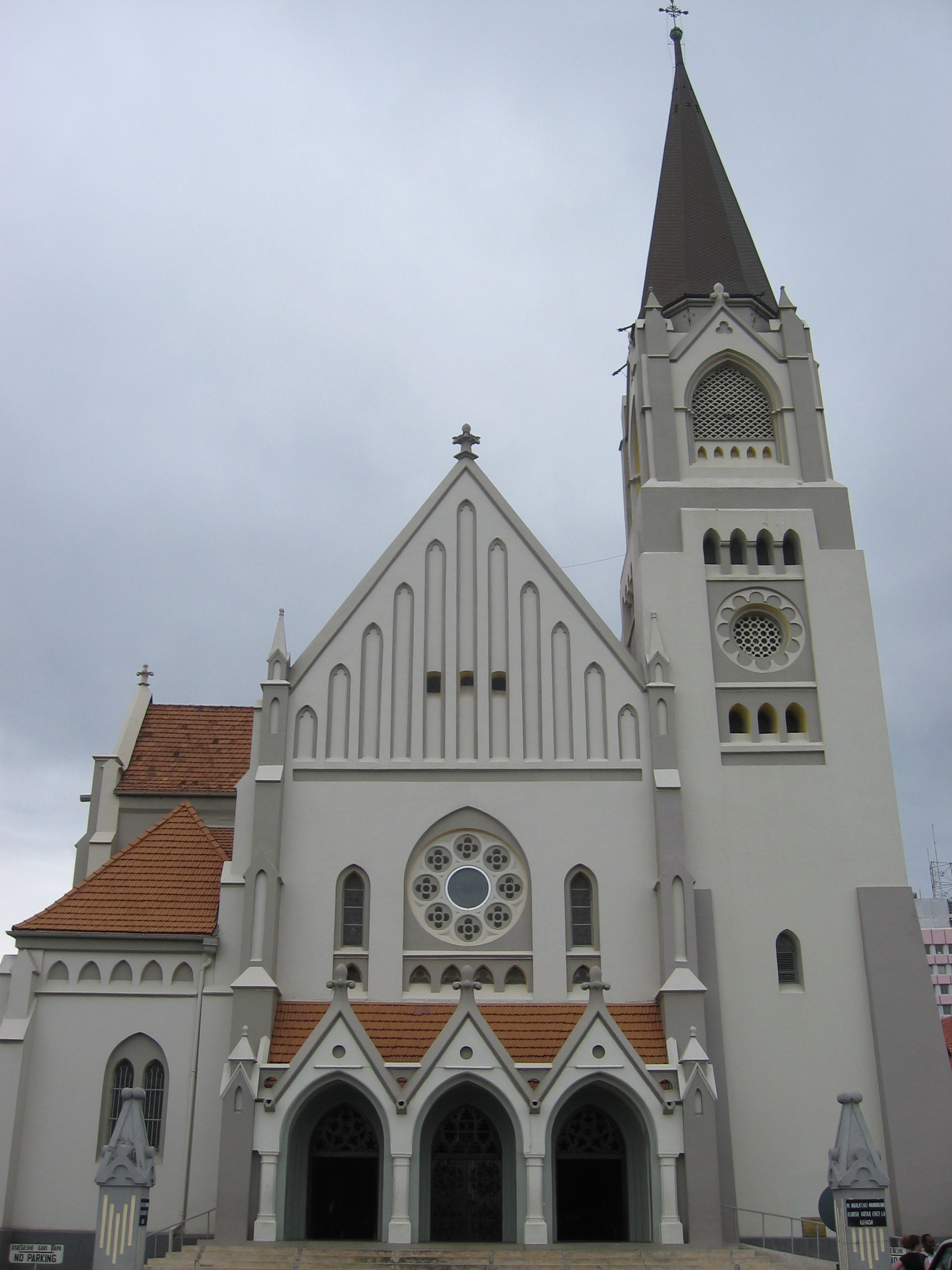
St. Joseph's Metropolitan Cathedral in Dar es Salaam

== Catholic ==
Cathedrals of the Catholic Church in Tanzania:

1. St. Theresa's Metropolitan Cathedral in Arusha
2. Mater Misericordiae Cathedral in Bukoba
3. Cathedral of St. Paul in Bunda
4. St. Joseph's Metropolitan Cathedral in Dar es Salaam
5. St. Paul of the Cross Metropolitan Cathedral in Dodoma
6. Cathedral of St. Patrick in Ifakara
7. Kihesa Sacred Heart Cathedral in Iringa
8. Our Lady of Victory Cathedral in Kigoma
9. Cathedral of Christ the King in Mahenge
10. Christ the King Metropolitan Cathedral in Mbeya
11. St. Patrick's Cathedral in Morogoro
12. Christ the King Cathedral in Moshi
13. Cathedral of the Immaculate Conception in Mpanda
14. Cathedral of Holy Mary Mother of God in Musoma
15. Metropolitan Cathedral of the Epiphany in Mwanza
16. Cathedral of Christ the King in Same
17. Mater Misericodiae Cathedral in Shinyanga
18. St. Mathias Mulumba Kalemba Metropolitan Cathedral in Songea
19. Cathedral of Sumbawanga
20. St. Theresa's Metropolitan Cathedral in Tabora
21. St. Anthony's Cathedral in Tanga
22. St. Joseph's Cathedral in Zanzibar City

== Anglican ==
Cathedrals of the Anglican Church of Tanzania:

- St Albans Cathedral Church in Dar es Salaam6°48′50″S 39°17′15″E
- Cathedral of Musoma
- St Steven's Cathedral in Shinyanga
- Cathedral Church of St Michael and All Angels in Korogwe
- Cathedral of Ngara in Murgwanza
- Cathedral of Musoma

== Lutheran ==
Lutheran cathedrals in Tanzania:

- Azania Front Cathedral in Dar es Salaam

Dodoma cathedral

== See also ==
- List of cathedrals
