= Our Lady of Mount Carmel Cathedral, Puerto Montt =

Coordinates: 41.4713°S 72.9397°W

Our Lady of Mount Carmel Cathedral
- Catedral de la Virgen del Carmen
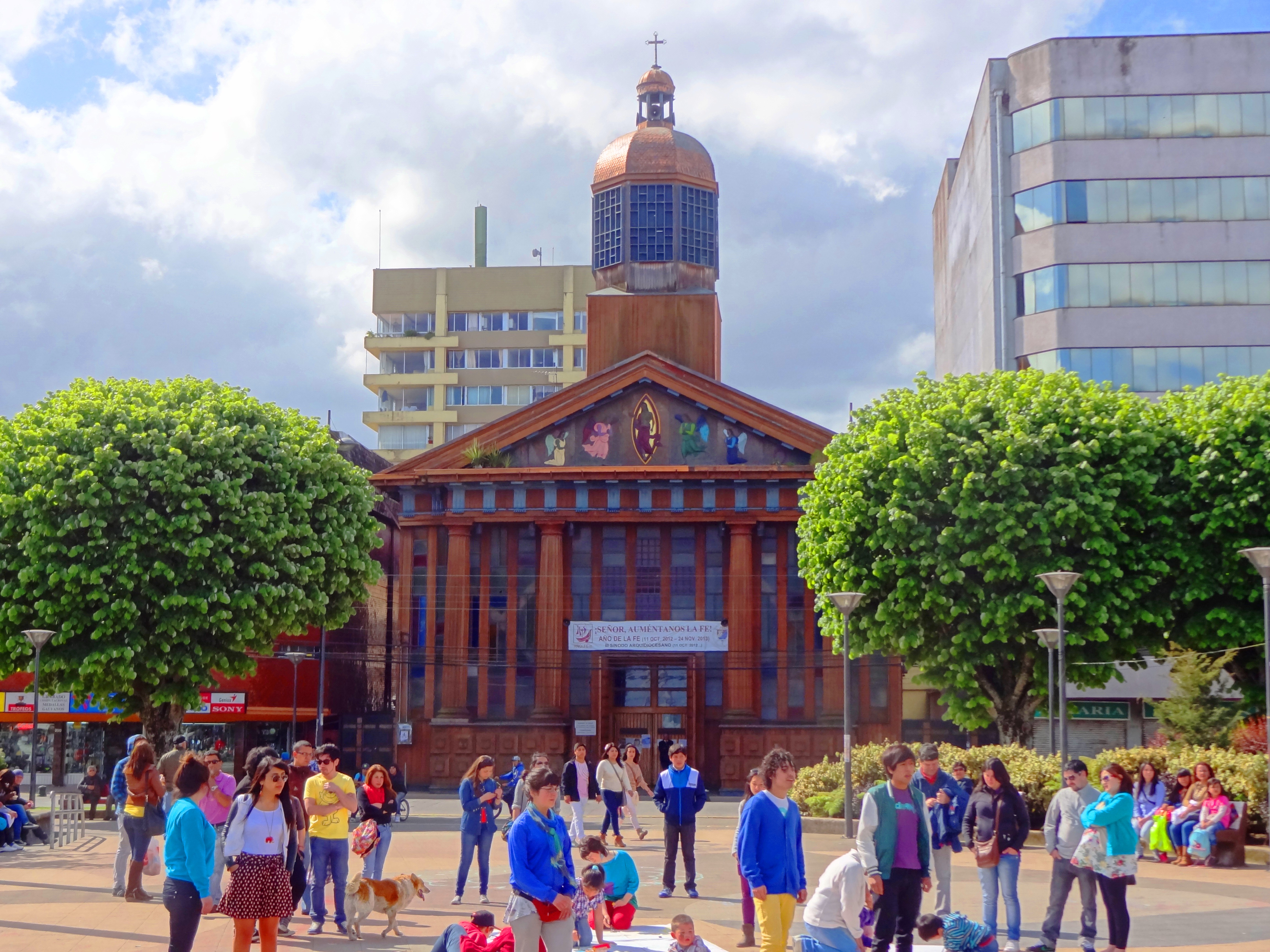
- Our Lady of Mount Carmel Cathedral
- Location: Puerto Montt
- Country: Chile
- Denomination: Roman Catholic Church

The Our Lady of Mount Carmel Cathedral (Spanish: Catedral de la Virgen del Carmen) Also Puerto Montt Cathedral Is a cathedral church of Catholic worship dedicated to the Virgin Mary under the invocation of Our Lady of the Carmen (Mount Carmel). It is located in the Plaza de Armas of Puerto Montt, and is the seat of the archbishop of the Archdiocese of Puerto Montt in Chile.

When the city of Puerto Montt was drawn by Vicente Pérez Rosales, he managed to have a plot of land in front of the square set aside to build a church, which was blessed as a parish in 1892. With the creation of the Diocese of Puerto Montt in 1939 By Pope Pius XII was elevated to cathedral. It was repaired in 1941 and then in the 1960s due to damage caused by the 1960 earthquake. In 1975 its interior was restored, and its last intervention was in the year 2002.

Its frontis presents four Doric columns that resemble the Parthenon. Its main structure is composed of native woods that form a planar system of beams resting on 12 columns of larch wood.

== See also ==
- Roman Catholicism in Chile
- Our Lady of Mount Carmel
