= List of Catholic churches in China =

This is a list of Catholic churches in China.

== Cathedrals ==
See: List of cathedrals in China#Roman Catholic

- Cathedral of the Immaculate Conception, Beijing
- Church of St Joseph, Beijing
- St. Theresa's Cathedral of Changchun
- Immaculate Conception Cathedral, Chengdu
- St. Joseph's Cathedral, Chongqing
- Aowei Church of Holy Rosary, Fuzhou
- Saint Dominic's Cathedral, Fuzhou
- Sacred Heart Cathedral of Guangzhou
- Immaculate Conception Cathedral of Hangzhou
- Cathedral of St. Thomas, Hefei
- Sacred Heart Cathedral (Jinan)
- Cathedral of the Immaculate Conception in Nanjing
- St. Michael's Cathedral, Qingdao
- Saint Ignatius Cathedral, Shanghai
- Sacred Heart Cathedral of Shenyang
- St. Joseph Cathedral (Tianjin)
- St. Francis Cathedral of Xi'an
- Cathedral of the Angels, Xichang
- St. Joseph Cathedral (Hankou Wuhan)

== Basilicas ==
- Sheshan Basilica

== Other churches ==
- Church of Our Lady of Mount Carmel, Beijing
- Church of the Saviour, Beijing
- Dalian Catholic Church
- Our Lady of Lourdes Church, Mianyang
- Saint Peter's Church, Shanghai
- Church of Christ the King, Xiamen

== See also ==
- List of Roman Catholic dioceses in China
- Roman Catholicism in China
