= Our Lady of Rosary Cathedral, Cafayate =

Our Lady of Rosary Cathedral
- Catedral de Nuestra Señora del Rosario de Cafayate
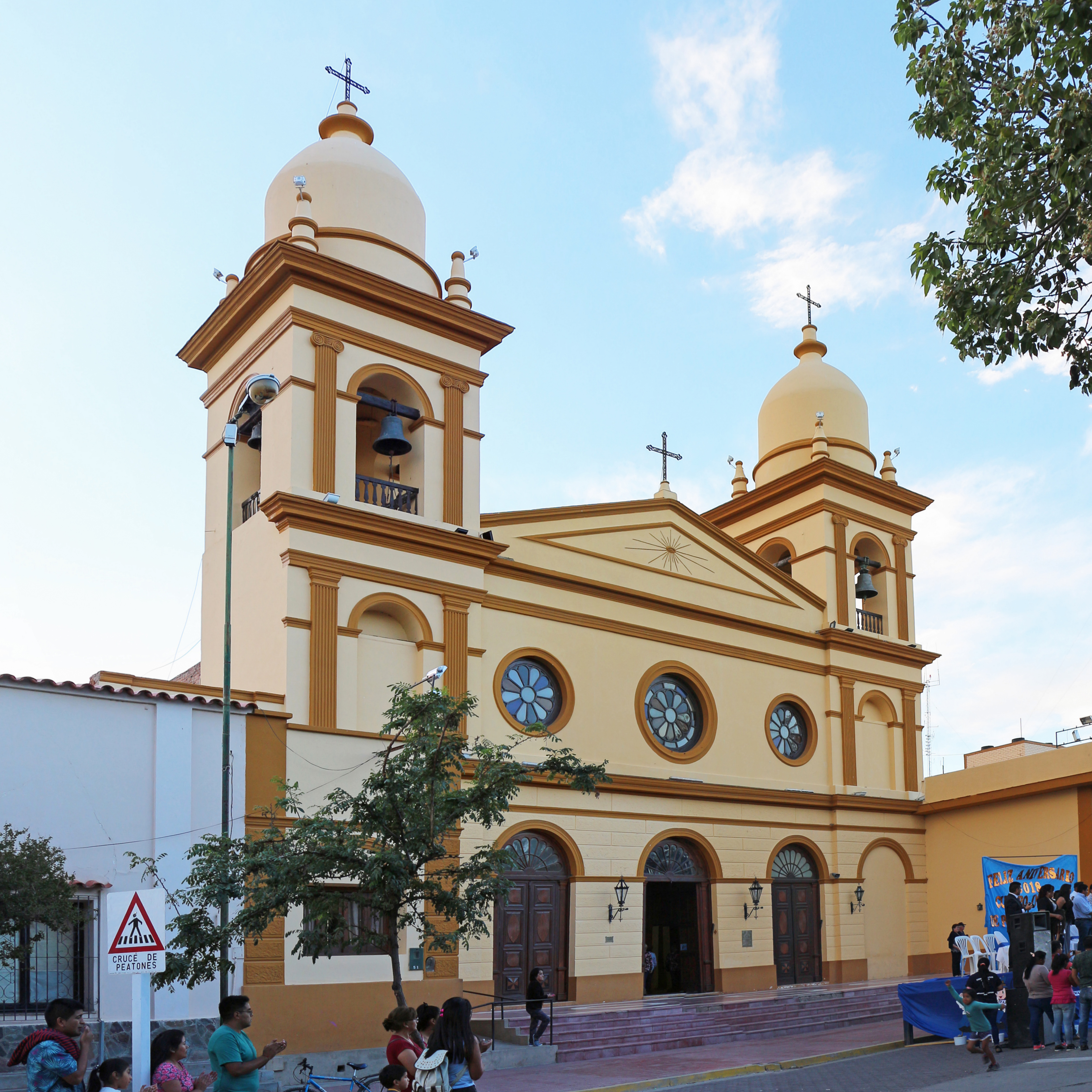
- Our Lady of Rosary Cathedral
- 26.0728°S 65.9790°W
- Location: Cafayate
- Country: Argentina
- Denomination: Roman Catholic Church

The Our Lady of Rosary Cathedral (Spanish: Catedral de Nuestra Señora del Rosario de Cafayate) Also Cafayate Cathedral It is a religious monument of Argentina, seat of the Catholic bishopric of Cafayate, suffragan of the archbishopric of Salta. It is located in the city of Cafayate, province of Salta. It is organized in fact as a territorial prelature.

The construction of the structure dates from the year 1885. The objective was to find a new site to replace the old building that was falling into ruins.

The cathedral is made up of five naves. There are only three such structures that survive in South America. The building is dedicated as its name indicates to Our Lady of the Rosary, it follows the Roman or Latin rite and it is under the responsibility of the Bishop Demetrio Jiménez Sánchez-Mariscal.

== Gallery ==
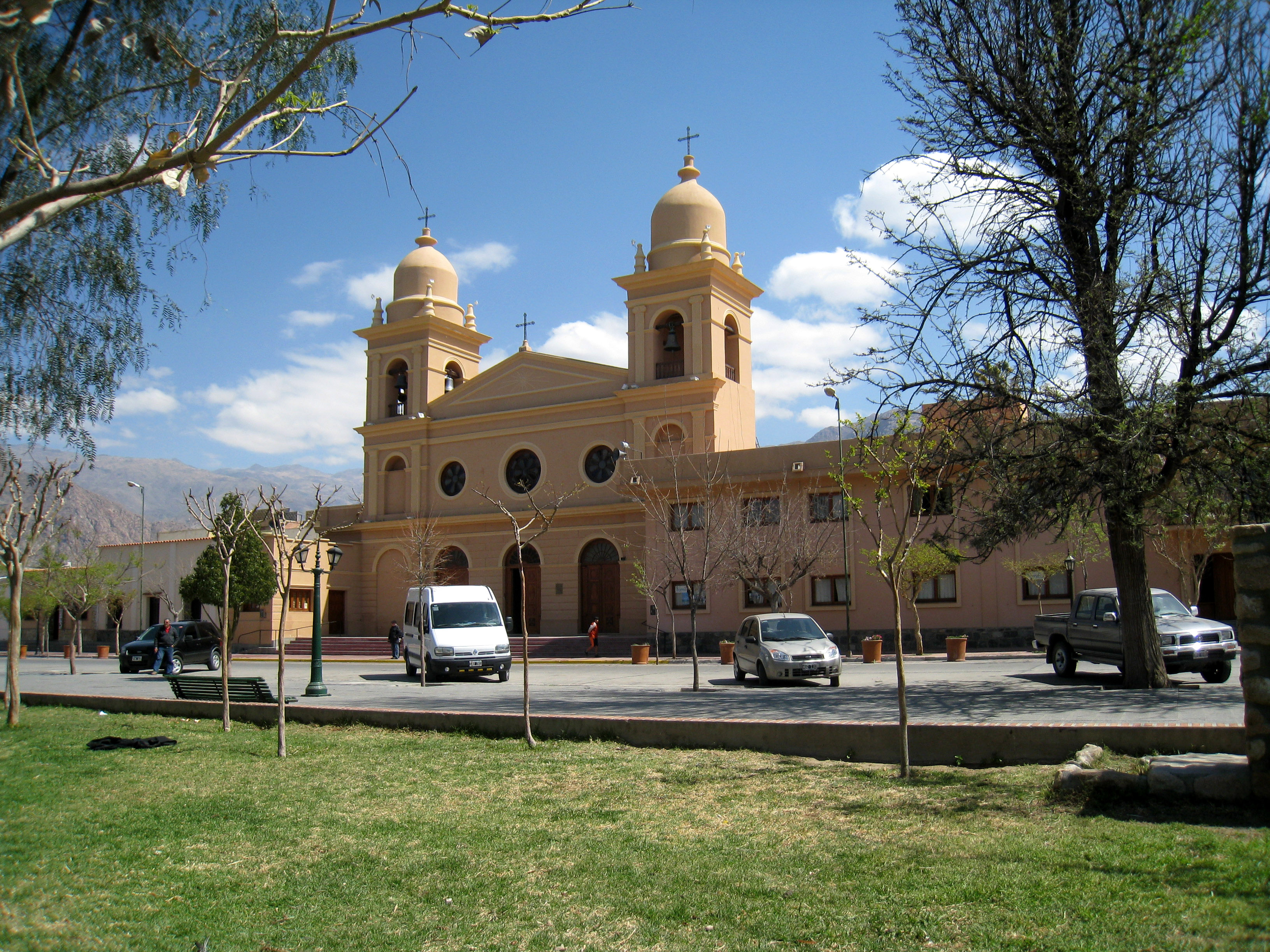
Exterior

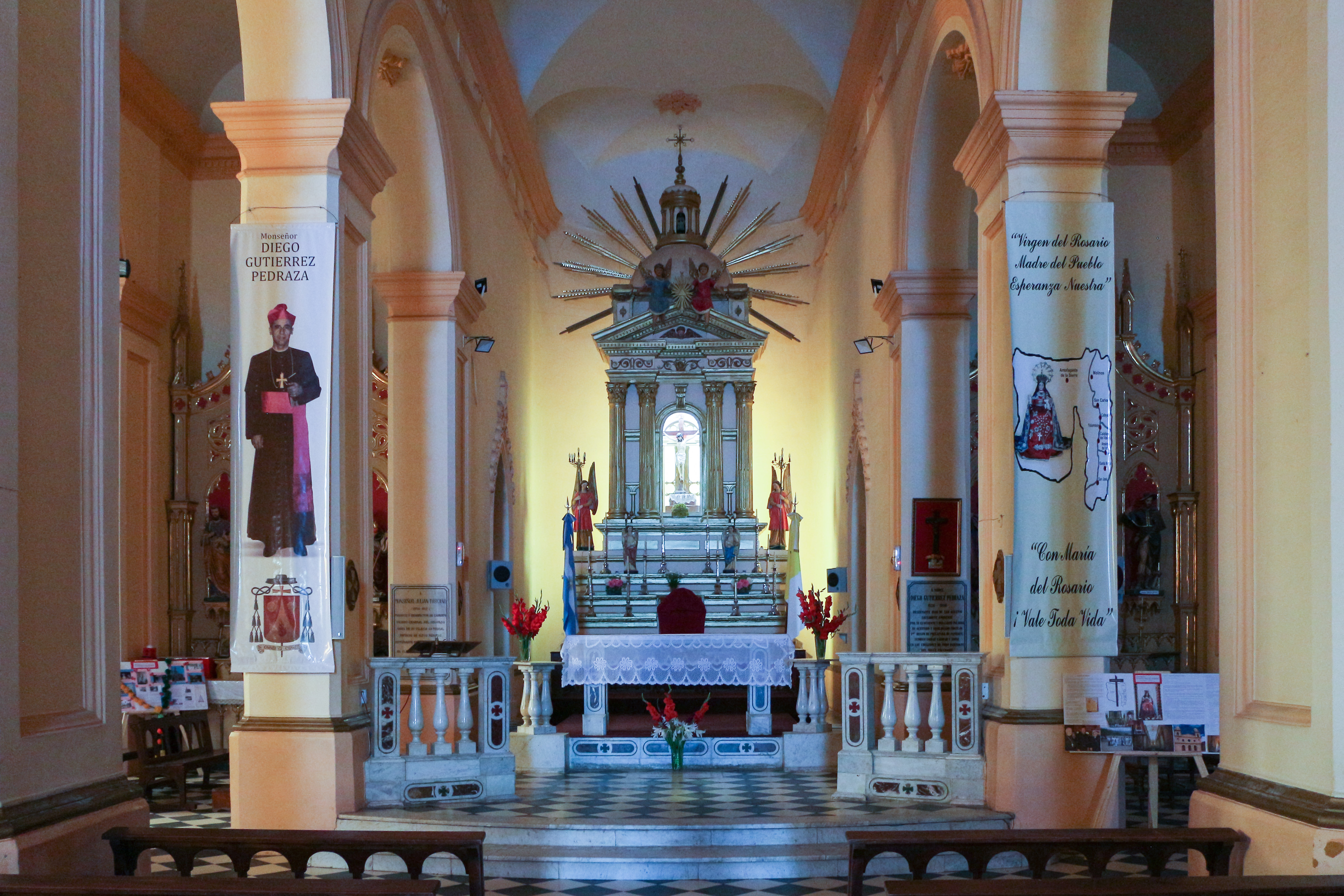
Interior

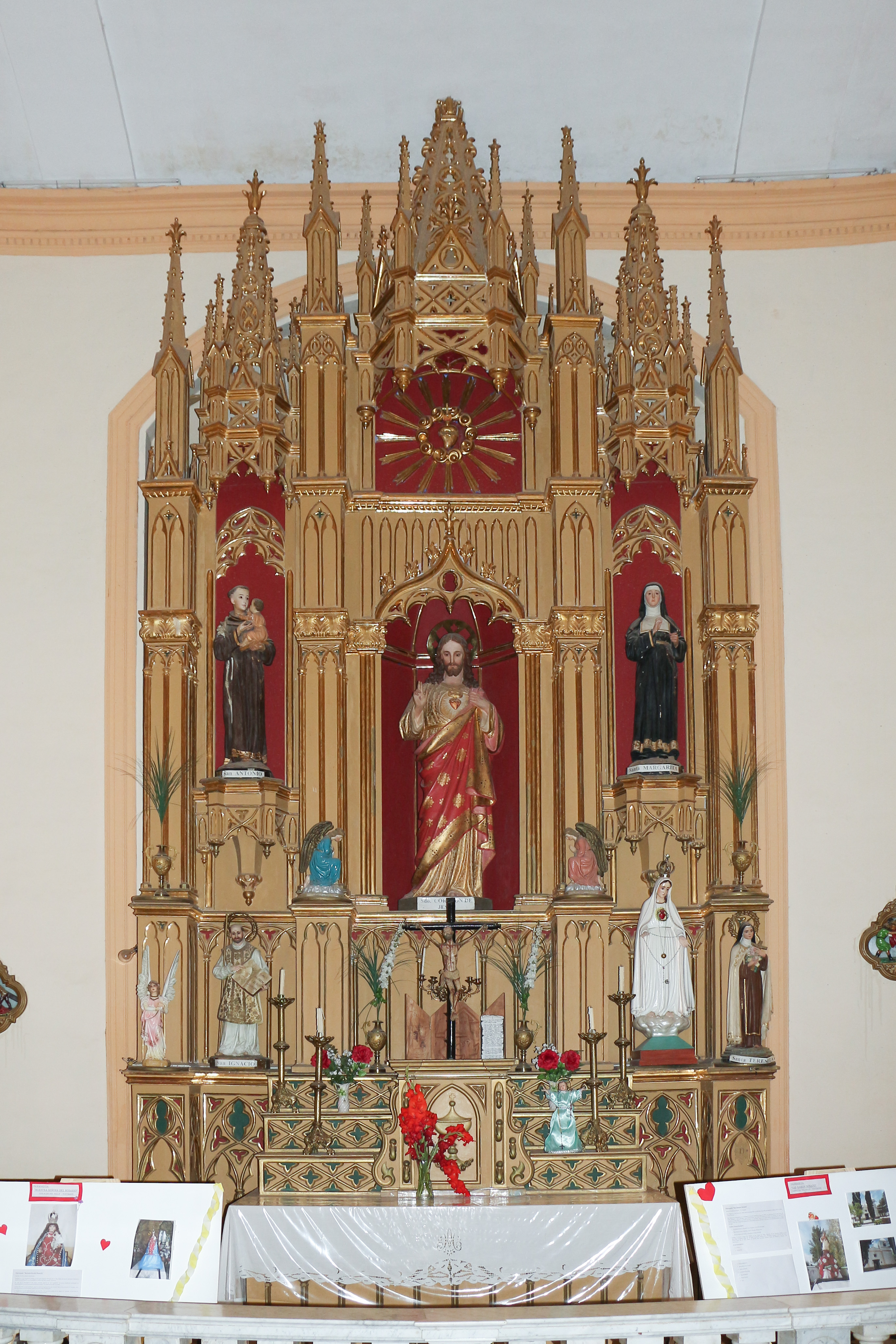
Interior

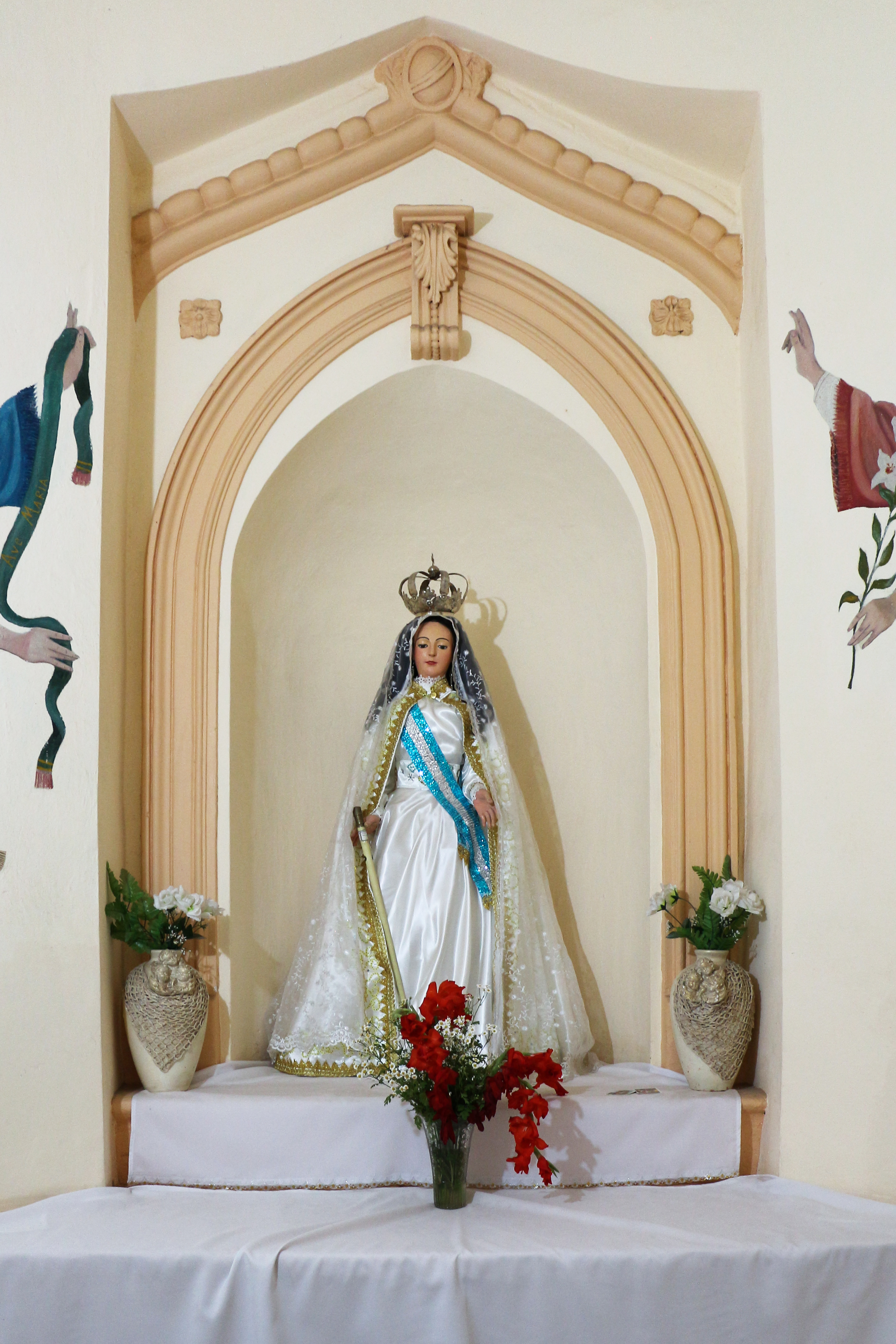
Interior

== See also ==
- Roman Catholicism in Argentina
- Our Lady of Rosary
