= List of cathedrals in Poland =

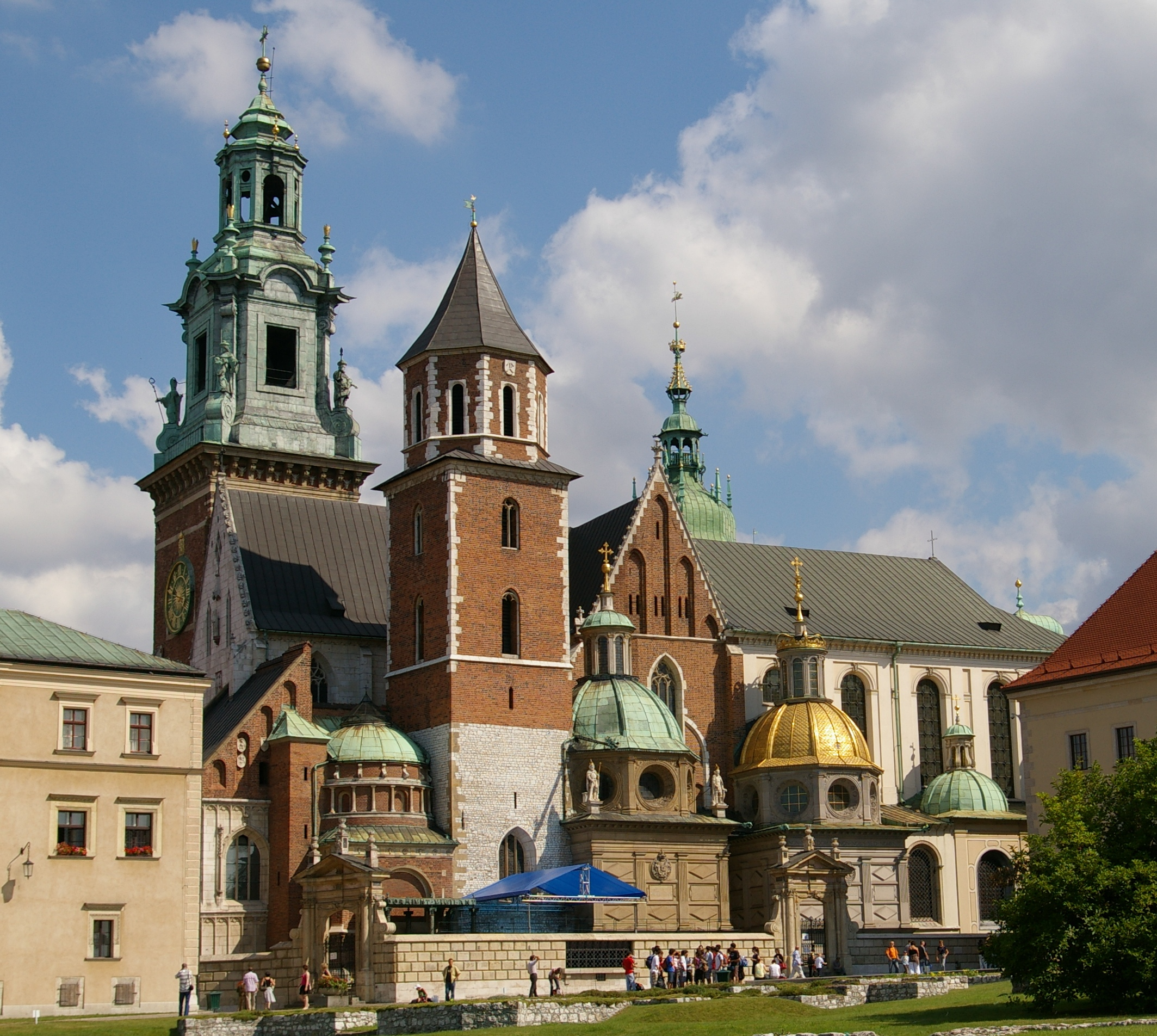
Cathedral Basilica of St. Stanislaus and St. Wenceslaus in Kraków has been the main coronation site and burial site for Polish monarchs since the 14th century

This is the list of cathedrals in Poland sorted by denomination.

== Catholic ==
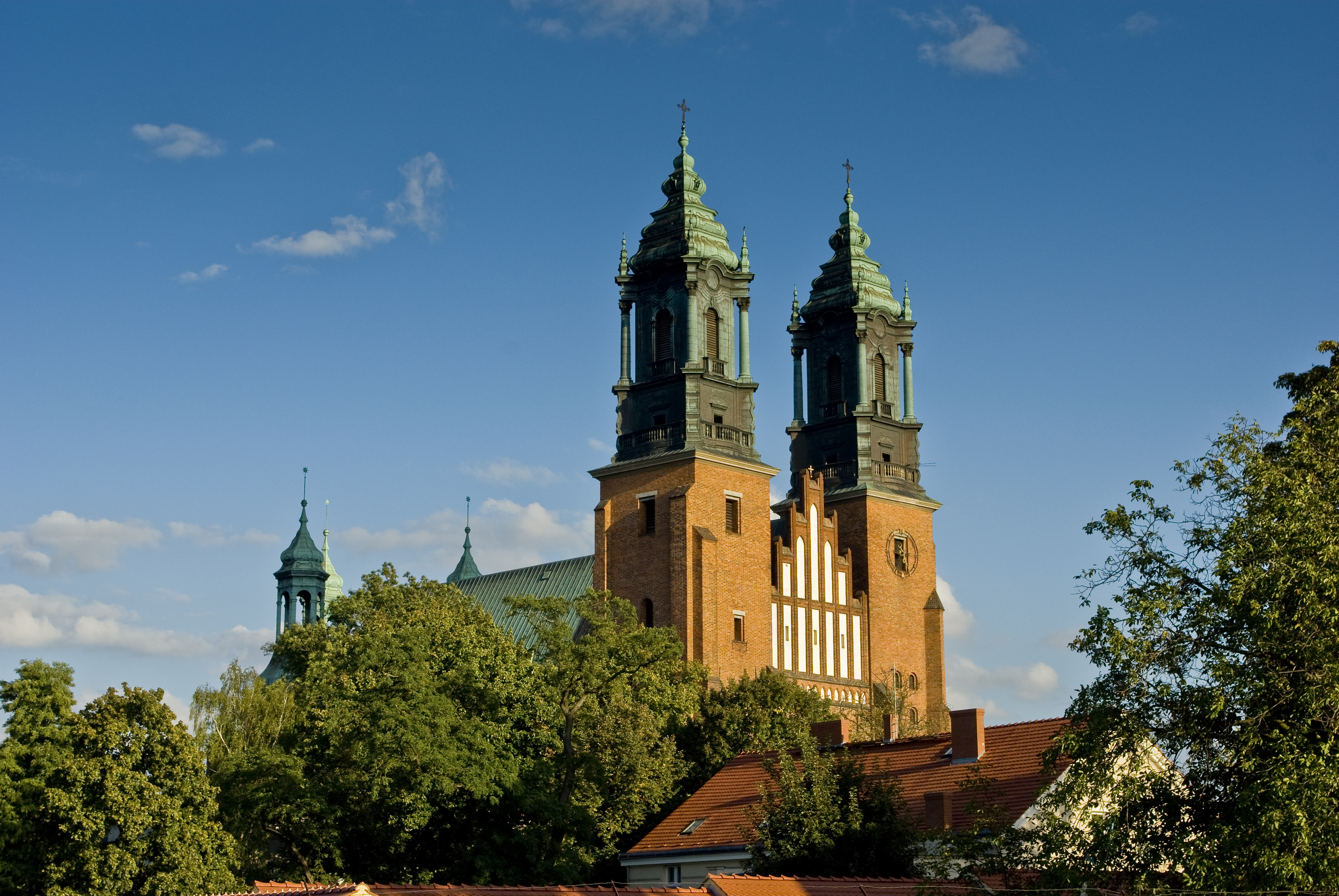
Poznań Cathedral, seat of the oldest Polish diocese (now archdiocese), est. in 968

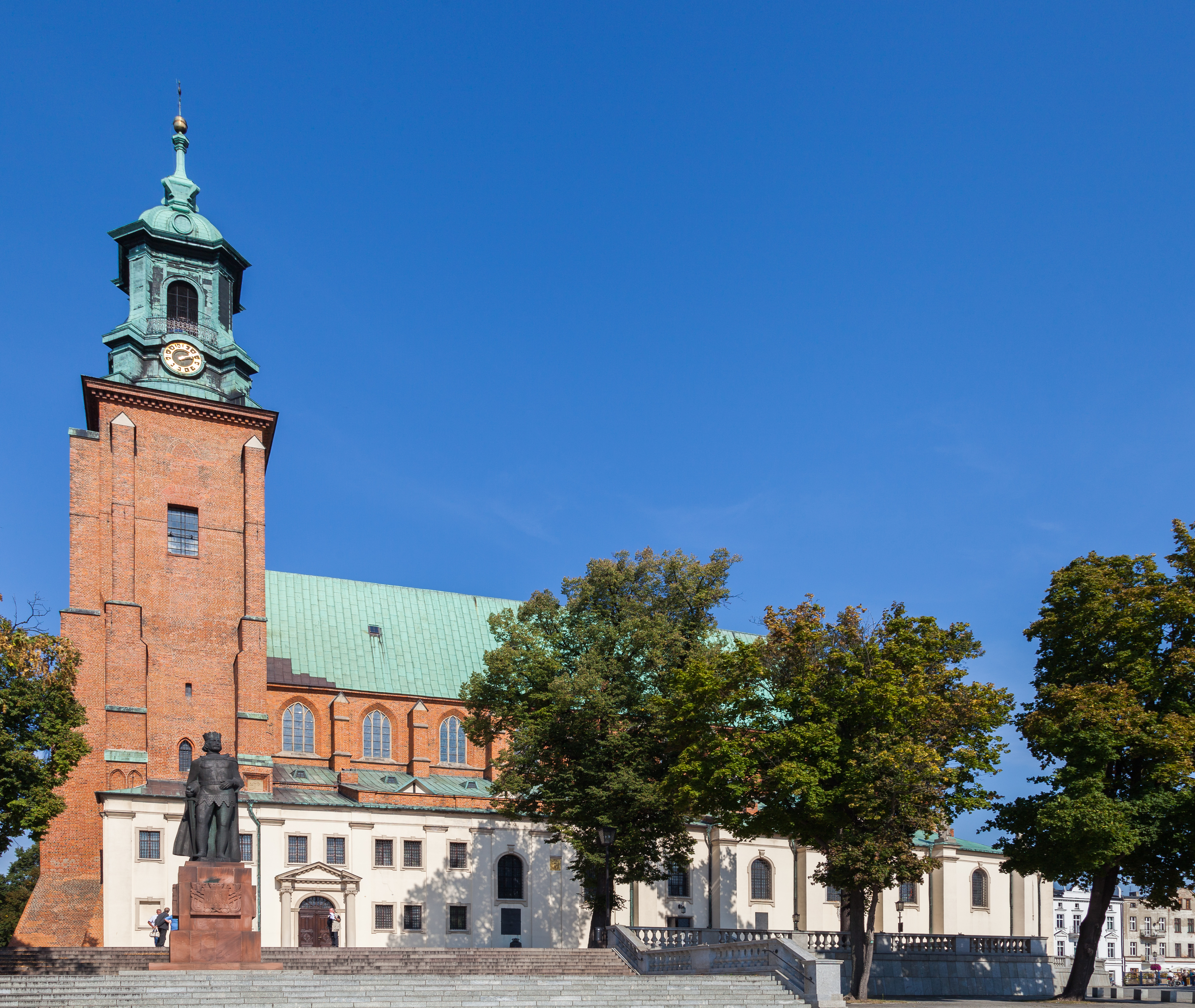
Gniezno Cathedral, seat of the Archdiocese of Gniezno, the oldest Polish archdiocese, est. in 1000

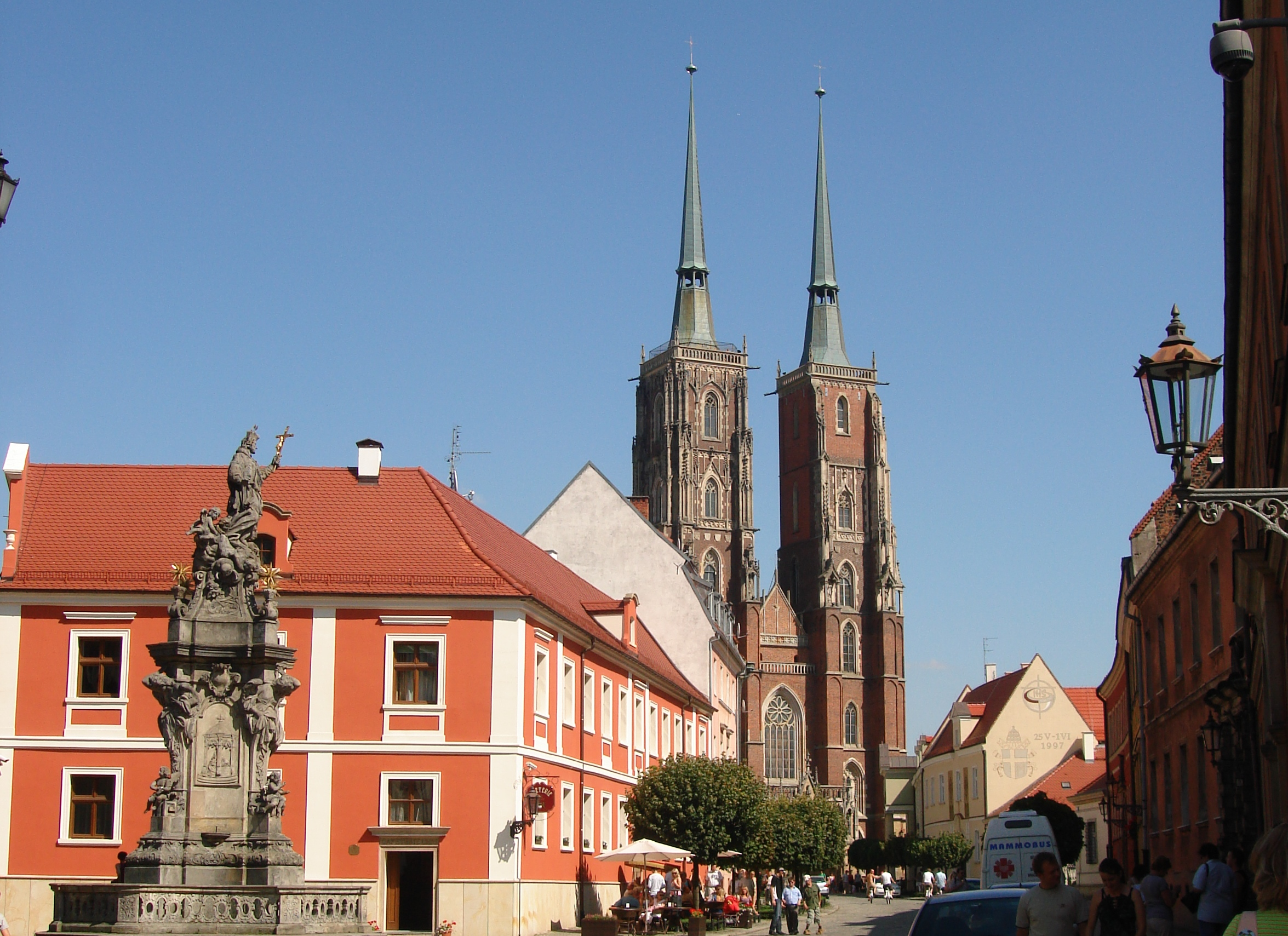
Wrocław Cathedral, seat of one of the oldest Polish dioceses (now archdiocese), est. in 1000

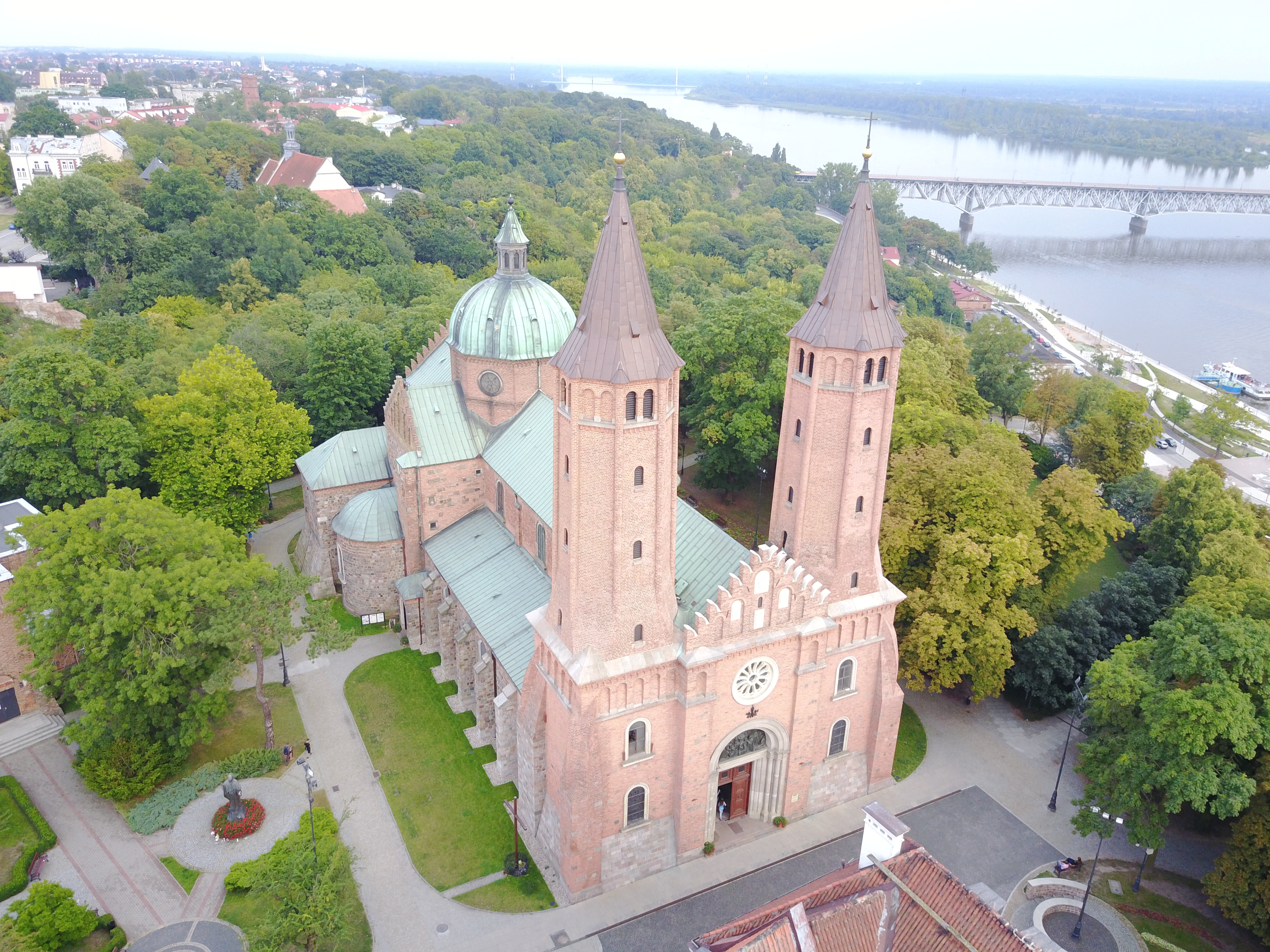
Płock Cathedral, seat of one of the oldest Polish dioceses, est. in 1075; burial site of several medieval Polish monarchs

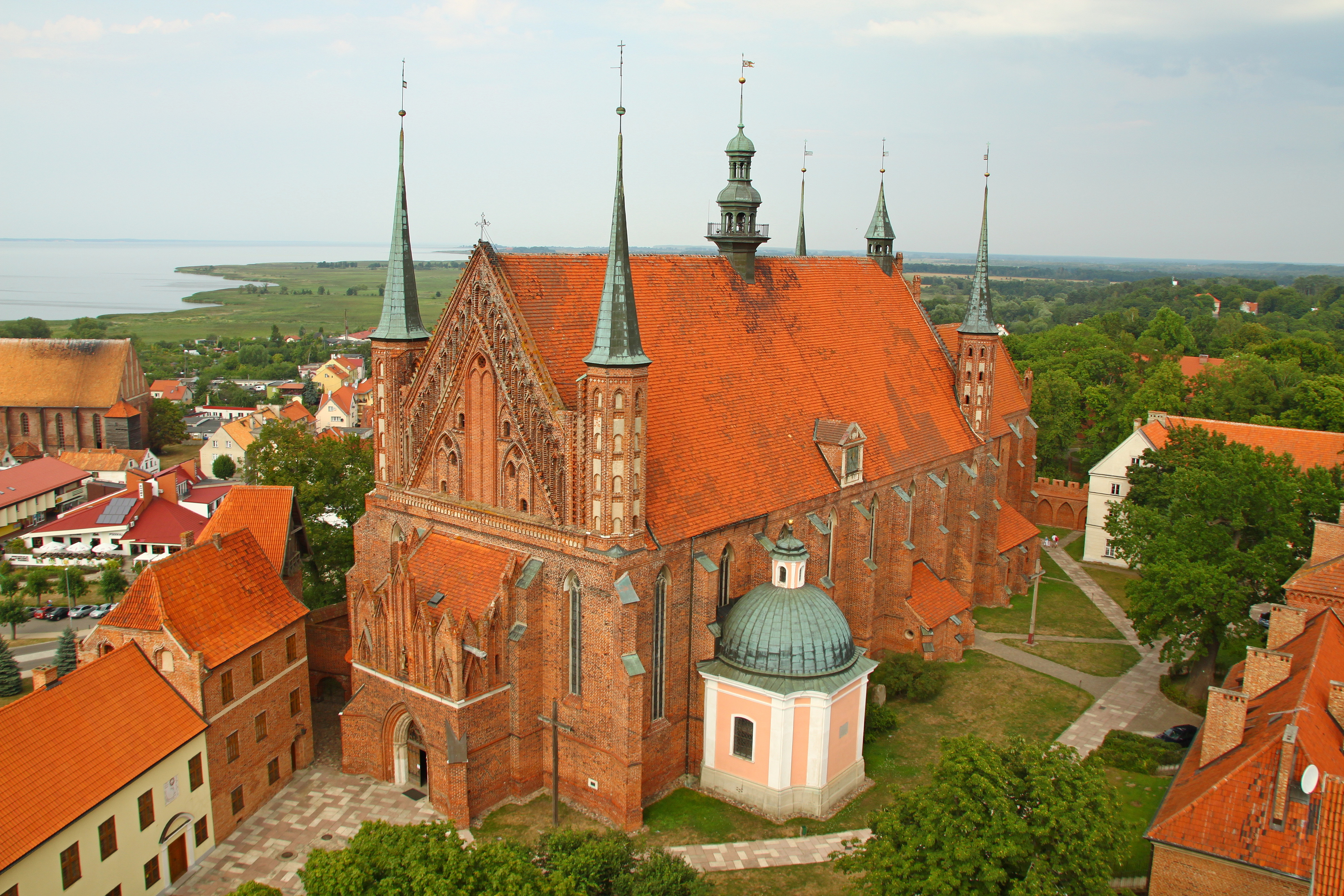
Frombork Cathedral, seat of the Archdiocese of Warmia; burial site of astronomer Nicolaus Copernicus

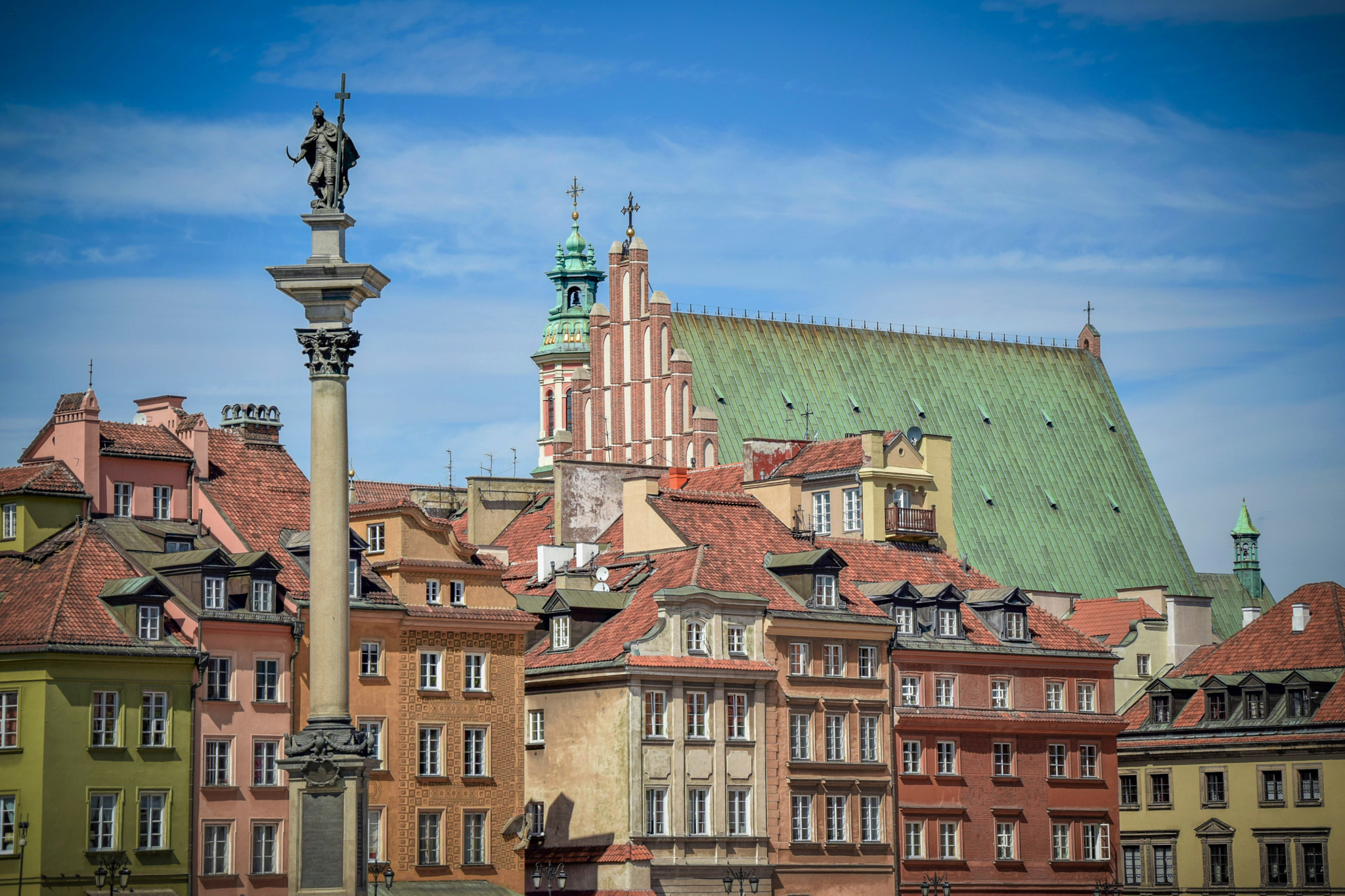
St. John's Archcathedral, the main Catholic cathedral of left-bank Warsaw, overlooking the Warsaw Old Town

Cathedrals of the Catholic Church in Poland:

- Cathedral Basilica of the Assumption of the Blessed Virgin Mary in Białystok
- Cathedral of St. Nicholas in Bielsko-Biała
  - Co-Cathedral of the Nativity of the Blessed Virgin Mary in Żywiec
- Cathedral of St. Martin and St. Nicholas in Bydgoszcz
- Basilica of Our Lady of Licheń in Licheń
- Cathedral Basilica of the Holy Family in Częstochowa
- Cathedral of the Most Holy Trinity in Drohiczyn
  - Co-Cathedral of the Immaculate Heart of Mary in Sokołów Podlaski
- Cathedral of St. Nicholas in Elbląg
  - Co-Cathedral of St. John the Evangelist in Kwidzyn
  - Co-Cathedral of St. Adalbert in Prabuty
- Cathedral of St. Adalbert in Ełk
  - Co-Cathedral of Mary Mother of the Church in Gołdap
  - Co-Cathedral of St. Alexander in Suwałki
- Cathedral Basilica of the Most Holy Trinity (Assumption) in Oliwa
  - Co-Cathedral Basilica of the Assumption of the Blessed Virgin Mary in Gdańsk
- Cathedral of Sts. Peter and Paul in Gliwice
- Cathedral Basilica of the Assumption of the Blessed Virgin Mary and St. Adalbert in Gniezno
- Cathedral of St. Nicholas in Kalisz
  - Co-Cathedral of St. Stanislaus in Ostrów Wielkopolski
- Cathedral of Christ the King in Katowice
- Cathedral Basilica of the Assumption of the Blessed Virgin Mary in Kielce
- Cathedral of the Immaculate Conception of the Blessed Virgin Mary in Koszalin
  - Co-Cathedral Basilica of the Assumption of the Blessed Virgin Mary in Kołobrzeg
- Cathedral Basilica of St. Stanislaus and St. Wenceslaus in Kraków
- Cathedral of Sts. Peter and Paul in Legnica
- Cathedral Basilica of St. Stanislaus Kostka in Łódź
- Cathedral of St. Michael the Archangel in Łomża
- Cathedral Basilica of the Assumption of the Blessed Virgin Mary and St. Nicholas in Łowicz
- Cathedral of St. John the Baptist in Lublin
- Cathedral Basilica of the Holy Cross in Opole
- Cathedral of Queen of Poland in Warsaw
- Cathedral Basilica of the Assumption of the Blessed Virgin Mary in Pelplin
- Cathedral Basilica of the Blessed Virgin mary of Masovia in Płock
- Cathedral Basilica of Sts. Peter and Paul in Poznań
- Cathedral Basilica of the Assumption of the Blessed Virgin Mary and St. John the Baptist in Przemyśl
- Cathedral of St. John the Baptist in Przemyśl (Ukrainian Rite)
- Cathedral of the Protection of the Blessed Virgin Mary in Radom
- Cathedral of the Sacred Heart of Jesus in Rzeszów
- Cathedral Basilica of the Nativity of the Blessed Virgin Mary in Sandomierz
  - Co-Cathedral Basilica of Mary Queen of Poland in Stalowa Wola
- Cathedral of the Immaculate Conception of the Blessed Virgin Mary in Siedlce
- Cathedral Basilica of the Assumption of the Blessed Virgin Mary in Sosnowiec
- Cathedral of St. Stanislaus and St. Wenceslaus in Świdnica
- Cathedral Basilica of St. James the Apostle in Szczecin
  - Co-Cathedral of St. John the Baptist in Kamień Pomorski
- Cathedral Basilica of the Nativity of the Blessed Virgin Mary in Tarnów
- Cathedral Basilica of St. John the Baptist in Toruń
  - Co-Cathedral Basilica of the Most Holy Trinity in Chełmża
- Cathedral Basilica of Our Lady of the Assumption and St. Andrew in Frombork
  - Co-Cathedral Basilica of St. James in Olsztyn
- Cathedral Basilica of St. John the Baptist in Warsaw
- Cathedral Basilica of St. Michael the Archangel and St. Florian in Warsaw
  - Co-Cathedral of Our Lady of Victory in Warsaw
- Cathedral of the Assumption of the Blessed Virgin Mary in Włocławek
- Cathedral Basilica of St. John the Baptist in Wrocław
- Cathedral of St. Vincent and St. James in Wrocław (Ukrainian Rite)
  - Co-Cathedral of St. Bartholomew and St. Mary Protection in Gdańsk (Ukrainian Rite)
- Cathedral of the Resurrection and St. Thomas the Apostle in Zamość
  - Co-Cathedral Shrine of St. Stanislaus in Lubaczów
- Cathedral of the Assumption of the Blessed Virgin Mary in Gorzów Wielkopolski
  - Co-Cathedral of St. Hedwig in Zielona Góra

== Eastern Orthodox ==
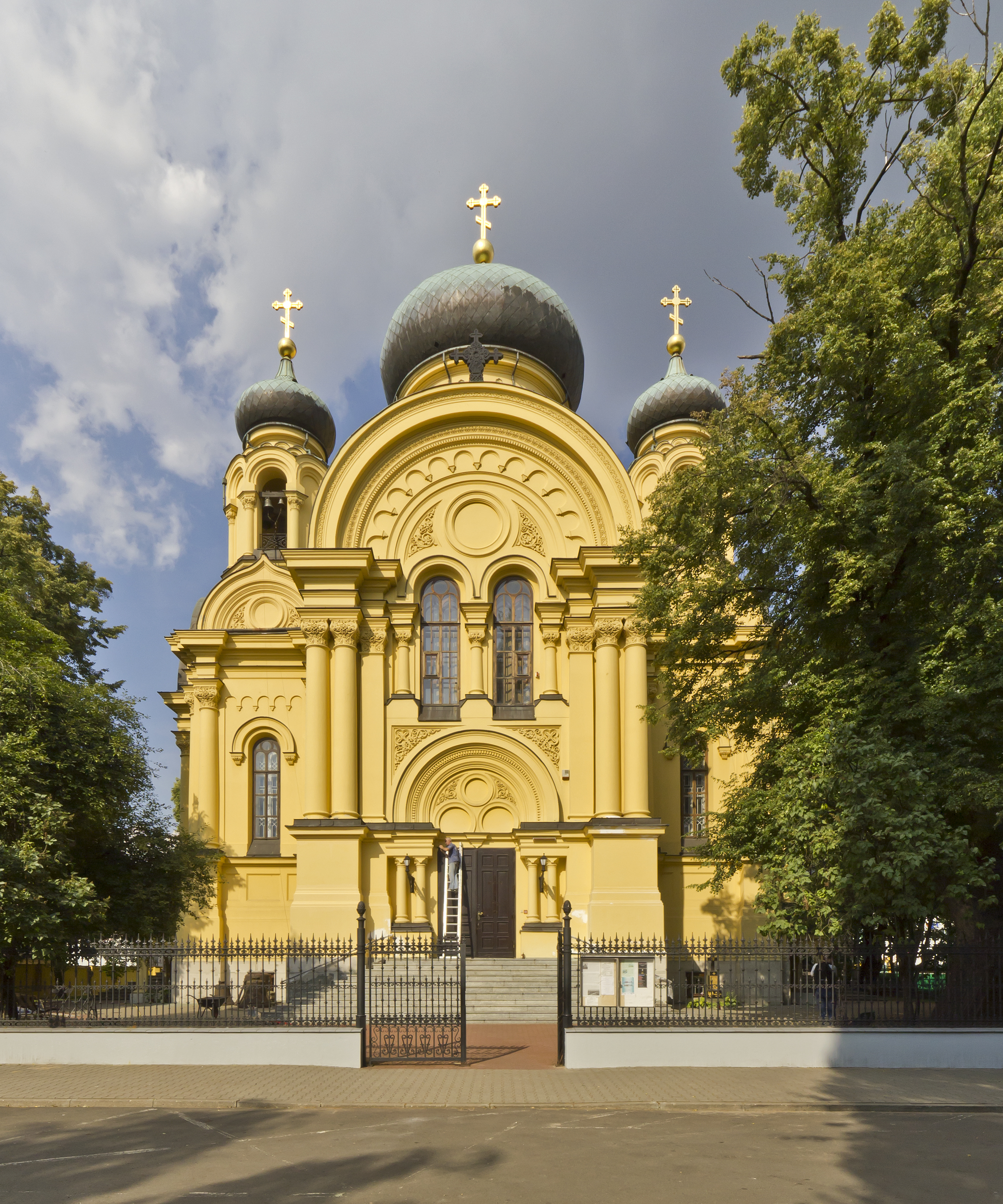
Cathedral of St. Mary Magdalene in Warsaw is the main Polish Orthodox Church

Cathedrals of the Polish Orthodox Church:

- Cathedral of St. Nicholas in Białystok
- Cathedral of St. Alexander Nevsky in Łódź
- Cathedral of the Transfiguration in Lublin
- Cathedral of the Holy Trinity in Sanok
- Cathedral of St. Mary Magdalene in Warsaw
- Provisional Field Cathedral of St. Nicholas the Wonderworker in Warsaw
- Cathedral of the Nativity of the Blessed Virgin Mary in Wrocław

== Polish Catholic Church ==
Cathedrals of the Polish Catholic Church:

- Cathedral of Virgin Mary the Queen of the Apostles in Częstochowa
- Cathedral of the Holy Spirit in Warsaw
- Cathedral of St. Mary Magdalene in Wrocław

== Mariavite Church ==
Cathedral of the Mariavite Church:

- Temple of Mercy and Charity in Płock

== See also ==
- Lists of cathedrals
- Christianity in Poland
