= List of cathedrals in Bolivia =

This is the list of cathedrals in Bolivia.

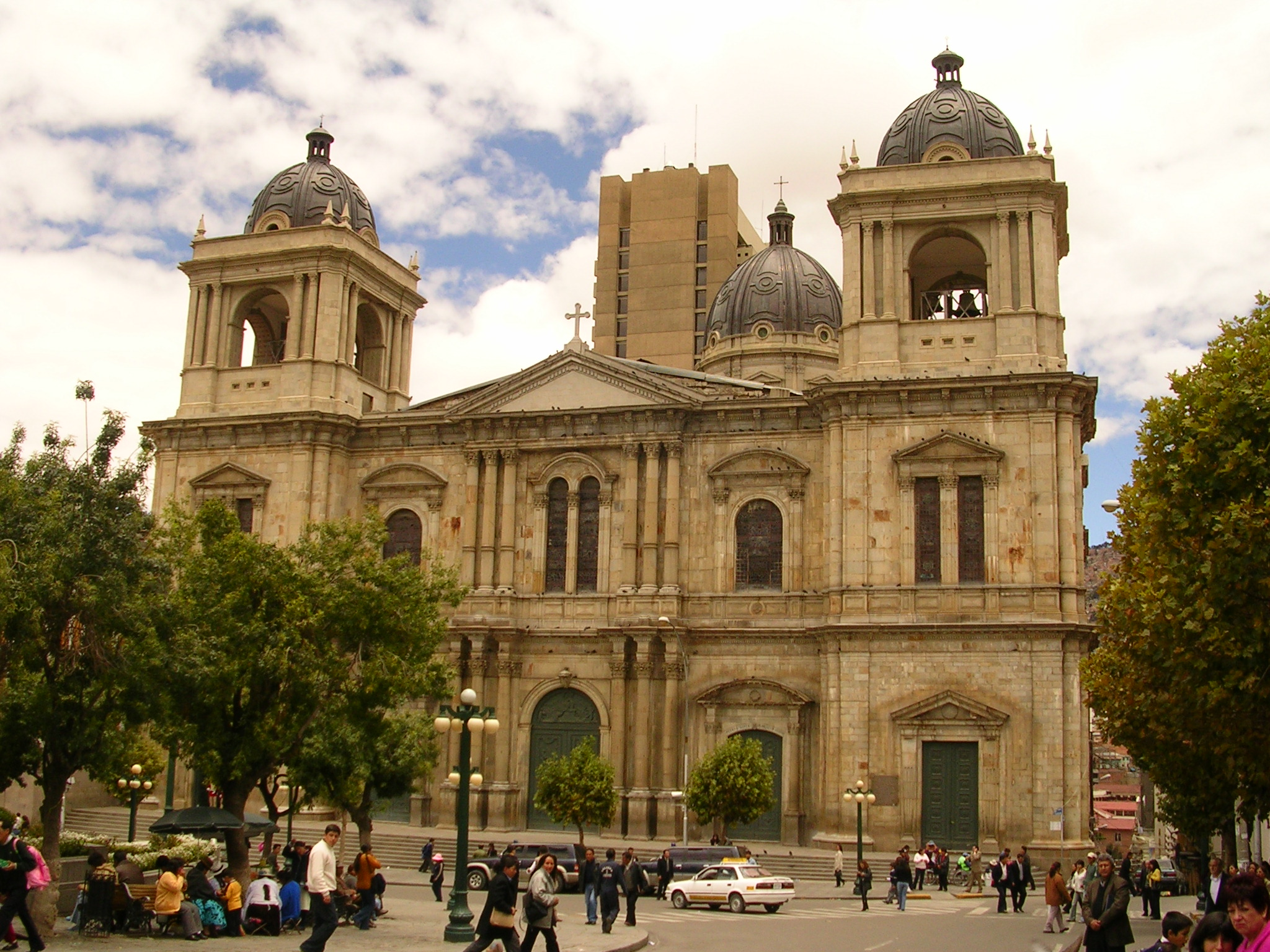
Cathedral Basilica of Our Lady of Peace in La Paz.

== Catholic ==
Cathedrals of the Catholic Church in Bolivia:

- Catedral de San Pedro Virgen de la Candelaria in Aiquile
- Cathedral of St. Francis of Assisi in Camiri
- Metropolitan Cathedral of St. Sebastian in Cochabamba
- Immaculate Conception Cathedral, Concepción
- Catedral de San Pedro y San Pablo in Coroico
- Cathedral of Our Lady of Candelaria in El Alto
- Cathedral Basilica of Our Lady of Peace in La Paz
- Cathedral of the Immaculate Conception in Ñuflo de Chavez
- Cathedral of Our Lady of Lujan in Irpavi
- Catedral Nuestra Señora de la Asuncion in Oruro
- Catedral Basílica de Nuestra Señora de La Paz in Potosí
- Cathedral of St. Ignatius in San Ignacio de Velasco
- Metropolitan Cathedral-Basilica of St. Lawrence in Santa Cruz
- Cathedral Basilica of Our Lady of Guadalupe in Sucre
- Cathedral of Our Lady of Peace in Tarija

== See also ==
- List of cathedrals
