= Our Lady of the Rosary Cathedral, Copiapó =

Coordinates: 27.3661°S 70.3331°W

Our Lady of the Rosary Cathedral
- Catedral Nuestra Señora del Rosario
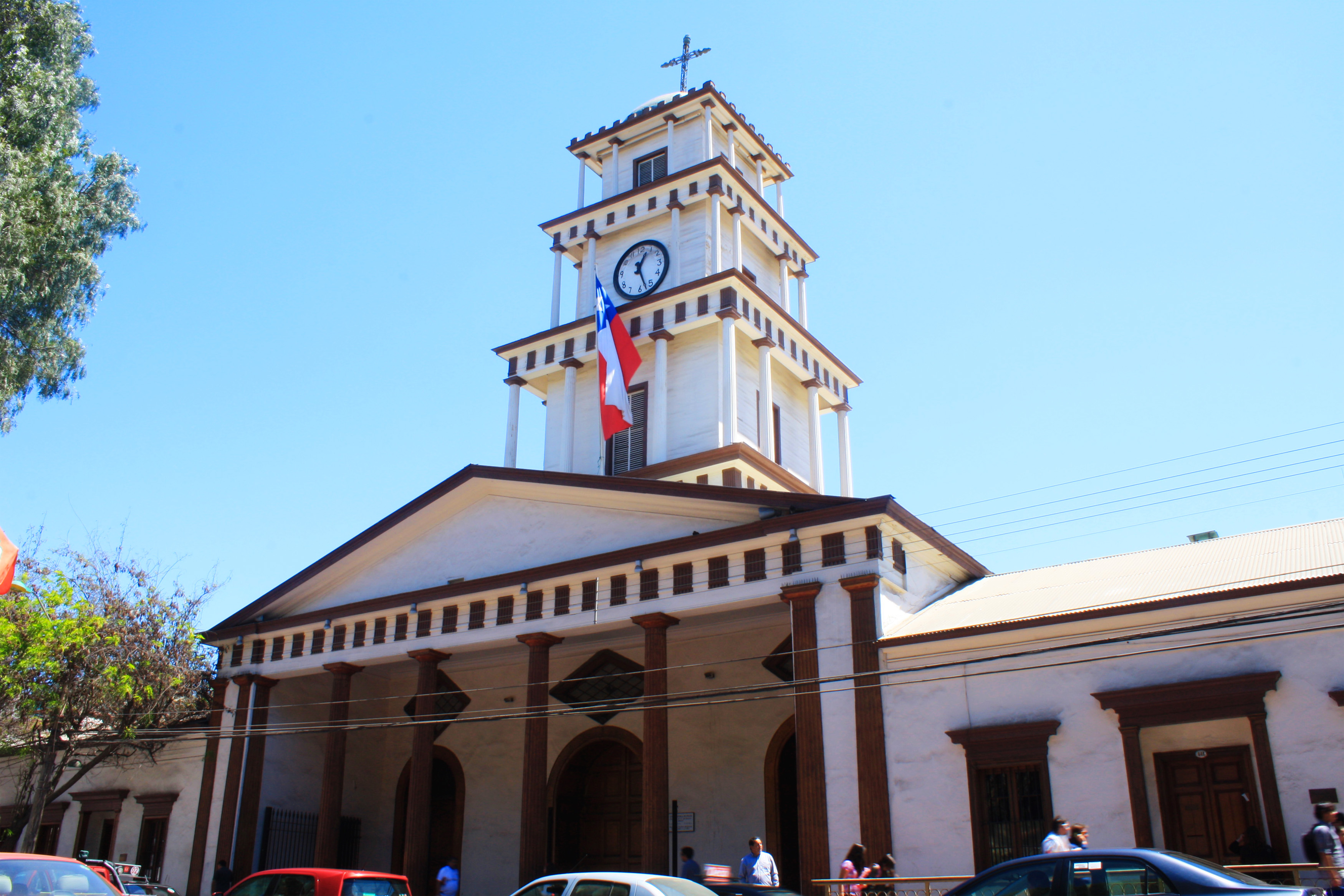
- Our Lady of the Rosary Cathedral
- Location: Copiapó
- Country: Chile
- Denomination: Roman Catholic Church

The Our Lady of the Rosary Cathedral (Spanish: Catedral Nuestra Señora del Rosario) Also Copiapó Cathedral Is the catholic cathedral of the Diocese of Copiapó in Chile. It is the largest temple in the city, and is located on the west side of Plaza Prat, at the intersection of Chacabuco and O'Higgins streets.

Before the present cathedral there existed in the same place a small parish was built between 1748 and 1750, that in 1766 opened its doors. This temple was completely destroyed in the earthquake of Copiapo of 1796 the 30 of March, reason why during 55 years the Chapel of the Jesuits assumed the ecclesiastical functions.

In 1840 began the construction of a new parish. In 1849, when it was only necessary to place the cover, the French architect Juan Herbage advised against the use of the adobe rig and it was decided to demolish the building. English builder William Rogers and 16 carpenters began construction of a new building using Oregon pine and Maule oak. It was opened to the public in 1851.

== See also ==
- Roman Catholicism in Chile
- Our Lady of the Rosary
