= St. Philip the Apostle Cathedral, San Felipe =

St. Philip the Apostle Cathedral
- San Felipe Cathedral
- Catedral de San Felipe Apóstol
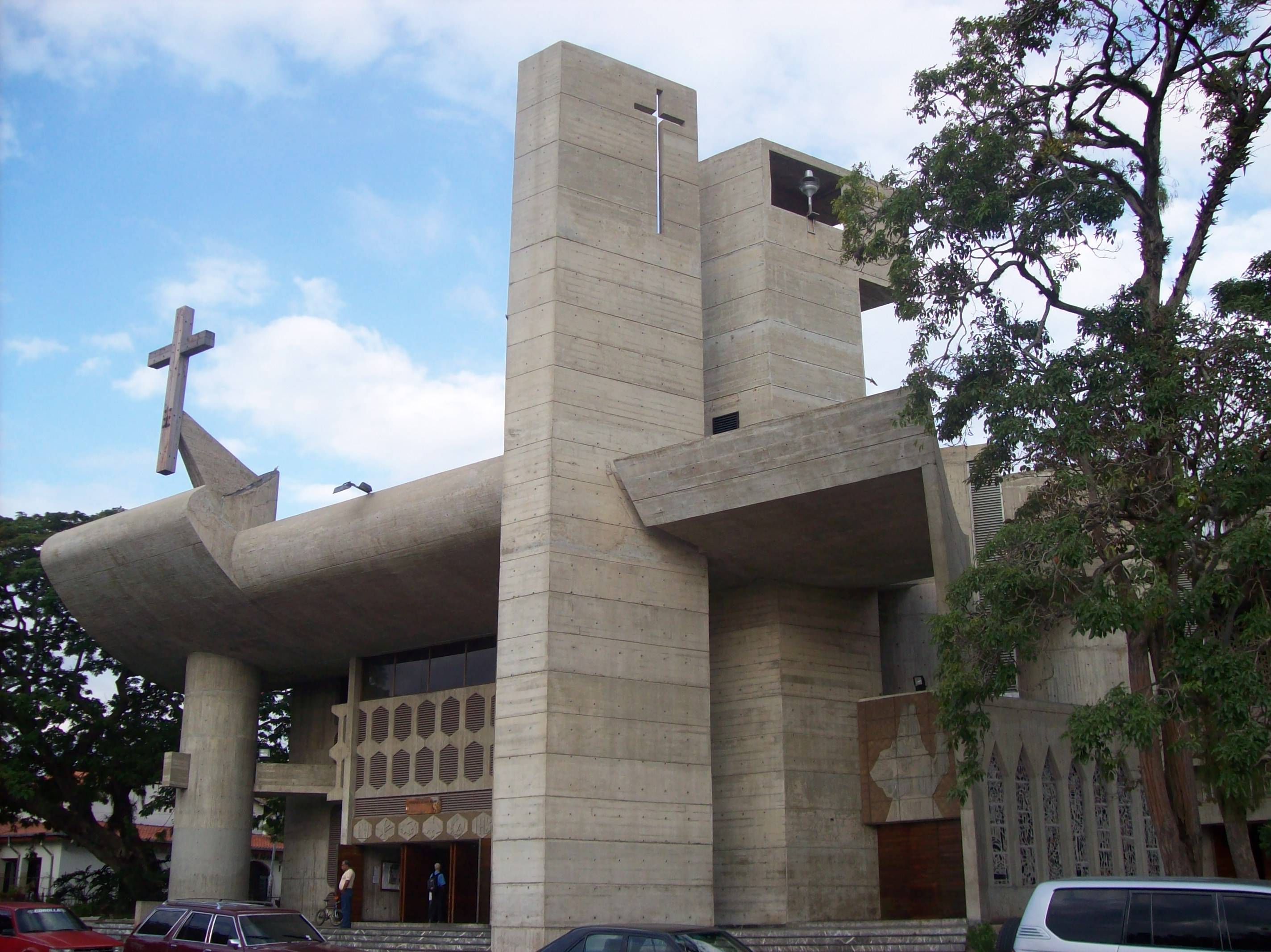
- St. Philip the Apostle Cathedral
- 10.3409°N 68.7365°W
- Location: San Felipe
- Country: Venezuela
- Denomination: Roman Catholic Church

The St. Philip the Apostle Cathedral (Spanish: Catedral de San Felipe Apóstol), also known as San Felipe Cathedral is a religious building belonging to the Catholic Church and is located on 7th Avenue between Caracas Avenue and 9 Street, in the city of San Felipe, in the municipality of San Felipe, the capital of Yaracuy State in the Central-Western Region of South American country of Venezuela.

The temple follows the Roman or Latin rite and functions as the headquarters of the Diocese of San Felipe (Dioecesis Sancti Philippi in Venetiola) that was created on October 7, 1966 when Pope Paul VI issued the Bull Ex tempore quo. The current building was completed in 1973 and replaced an older structure dating from the colonial era. Its design by architect Erasmo Calvani.

Not to be confused with a temple of the same name located in San Felipe, Chile.

== See also ==
- Roman Catholicism in Venezuela
- St. Philip the Apostle
