= St. Philip's Cathedral, San Felipe =

Coordinates: 32.7502°S 70.7243°W

St. Philip's Cathedral
- Catedral de San Felipe
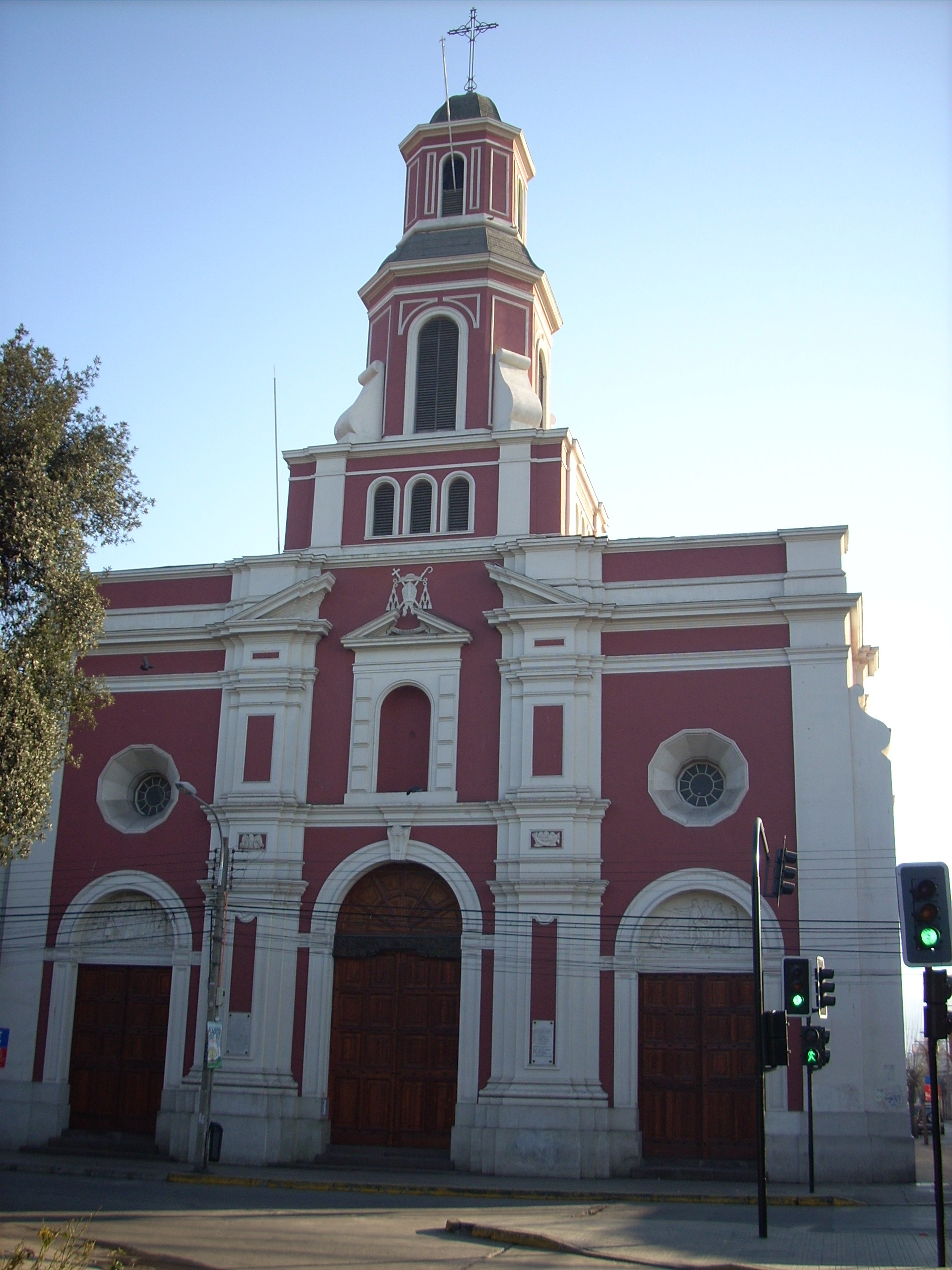
- St. Philip's Cathedral
- Location: San Felipe
- Country: Chile
- Denomination: Roman Catholic Church

The Cathedral of St. Philip (Spanish: Catedral de San Felipe), also San Felipe Cathedral, is a parish of the Roman Catholic Church in San Felipe, Valparaíso, Chile which serves as the cathedral church of the Diocese of San Felipe de Aconcagua.

Founded in 1740, with the foundation of the city, as the main church of Aconcagua, it is situated in front of the Plaza de Armas. Its first pastor was Doctor Don José de Rojas y Ovalle. In 1845, Don José de los Dolores Villarroel undertook the reconstruction of the parish church, relying exclusively on the support of parishioners, and the work was completed in 1850.

The church of St. Philip was made the episcopal seat with the erection of the Diocese of San Felipe in 1925.

== See also ==
- Catholic Church in Chile
