= List of cathedrals in El Salvador =

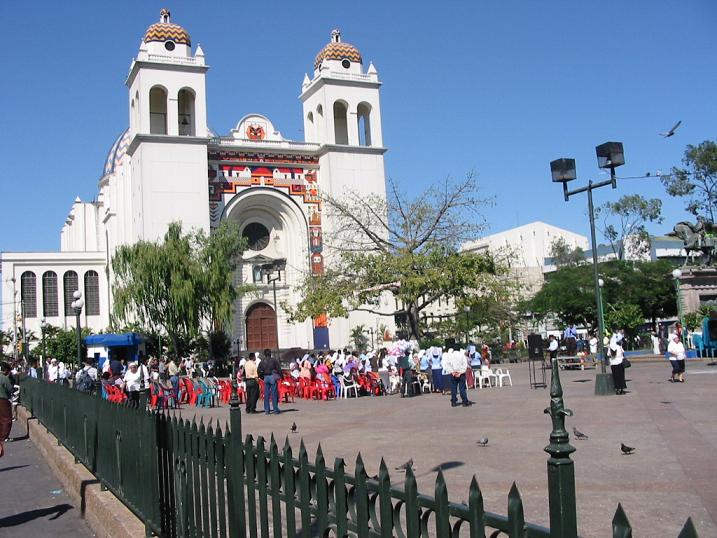
Metropolitan Cathedral Basilica of the Holy Saviour in San Salvador

This is the list of cathedrals in El Salvador sorted by denomination.

== Catholic ==
Cathedrals of the Catholic Church in El Salvador:

- St. John the Baptist Cathedral in Chalatenango
- Cathedral-Basilica of Queen of Peace in San Miguel
- Metropolitan Cathedral Basilica of the Holy Saviour in San Salvador
- Cathedral of St. Vincent in San Vicente
- Cathedral of St. Ann in Santa Ana
- Cathedral of St. James the Apostle in Santiago de María
- Cathedral of the Most Holy Trinity in Sonsonate
- Catedral de Nuestra Señora de los Pobres in Zacatecoluca

== See also ==
- Lists of cathedrals
