= Cathedral Basilica of Queen of Peace, San Miguel =

Coordinates: 13.4829°N 88.1748°W

Cathedral Basilica of Queen of Peace
- Catedral-Basílica Reina de la Paz
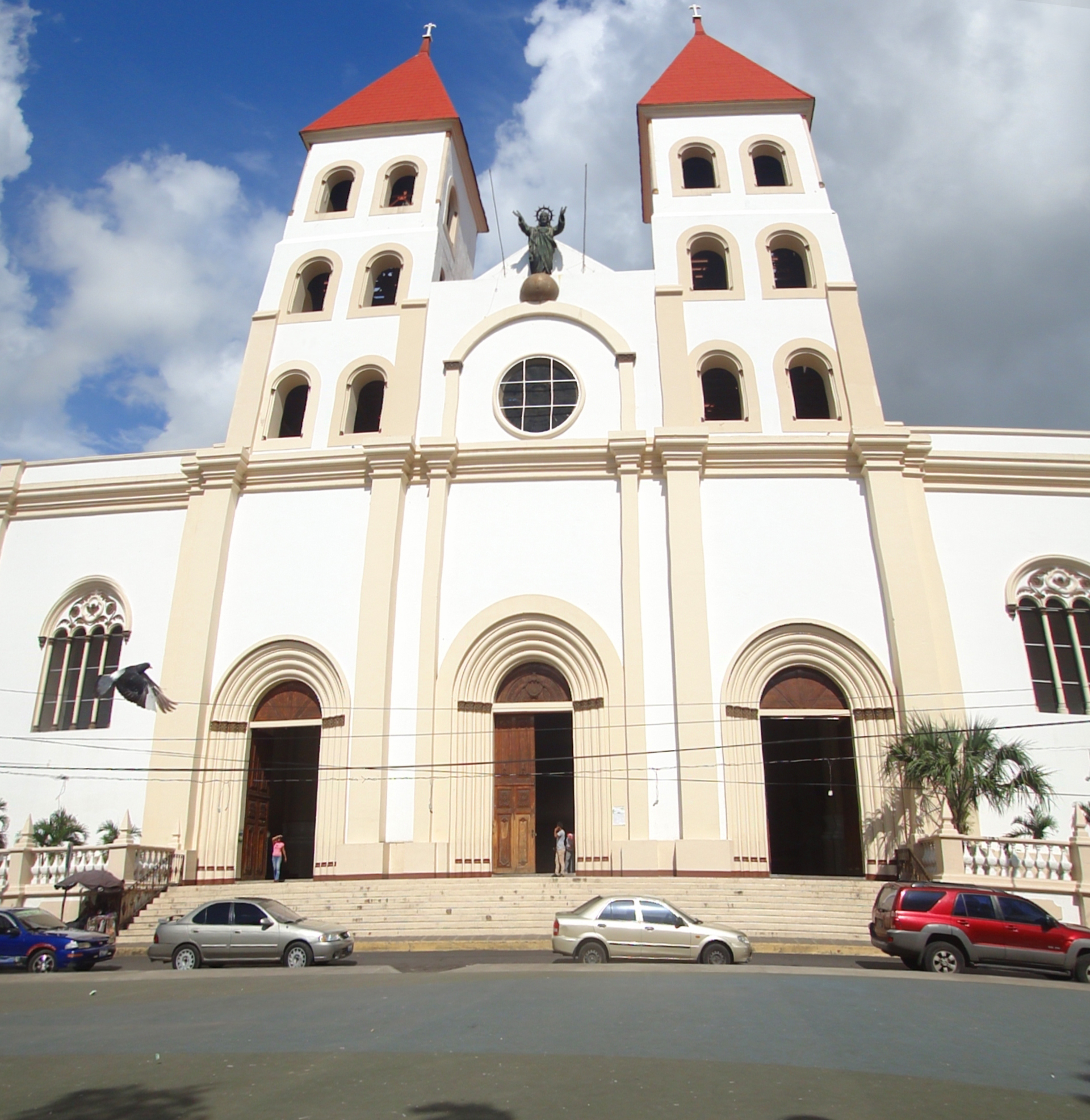
- Cathedral Basilica of Queen of Peace
- Location: San Miguel
- Country: El Salvador
- Denomination: Roman Catholic Church

The Cathedral Basilica of Queen of Peace (Spanish: Catedral-Basílica Reina de la Paz), also called San Miguel Cathedral, is a Catholic church located in the city of San Miguel, El Salvador.

In 1740 the mayor of San Salvador, Manuel Gálvez del Corral, reported that in San Miguel there was a parish church, two convents (San Francisco and La Merced) and two hermitages (San Sebastian and Calvary).

In 1862 the parish church, which bore the name "St Michael Archangel", was demolished to build a larger temple that would also serve as an oratory of veneration for the Virgin Our Lady of Peace. It is presumed that the first stone was laid by President Gerardo Barrios on November 21 of that year.

The first person in charge of its construction was the English engineer William Kirk who had to leave the project shortly after the death of Barrios. Still unfinished, the temple received the rank of cathedral by papal decree of Pius X, on 11 February 1913. Eight years later, on November 21, 1921, Monsignor Juan Antonio Dueñas y Argumedo proclaimed the Patronage of Our Lady of Peace and gave papal coronation of the image on behalf of Pope Benedict XV. The cathedral was declared completed in 1962 with the promotion of then pastor Oscar Romero, exactly a century after construction works had started.

== See also ==
· · ·
- Roman Catholicism in El Salvador
- Our Lady Queen of Peace

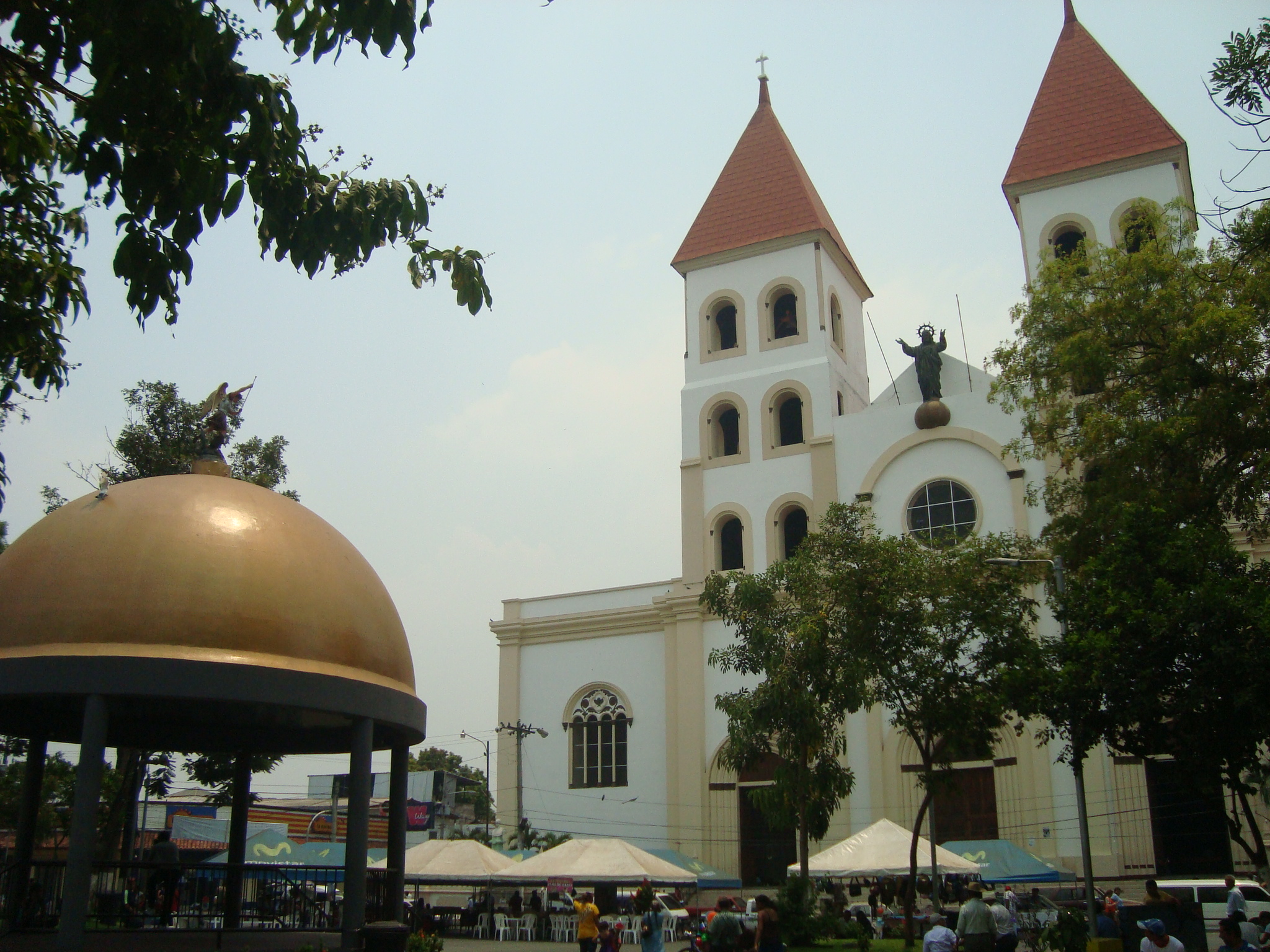
Another View
