= Catholic Church in El Salvador =

The Catholic Church in El Salvador is part of the worldwide Catholic Church, under the spiritual leadership of the Pope in Rome and the Episcopal Conference of El Salvador. There are almost 5 million Catholics in El Salvador. The country is divided into eight dioceses including one archdiocese, San Salvador. The Constitution explicitly recognizes the Catholic Church and it has legal status.

According to a February 2021 survey by the University of Central America’s Institute of Public Opinion, 43.3% of the population saw themselves as Catholic, 33.9% as evangelical Christian, and 18.6% had no religious affiliation.

Despite its legal status, Catholicism in El Salvador has been in decline for the last 17 years with the most devout members above age 53. According to some sources, Catholicism is only adhered to by 39% of its populace. Catholicism is most dominant in the San Vicente Department and weakest in Santa Ana. In the fall of 2018, El Salvador had its first saint, Saint Oscar Romero.

== History and society ==
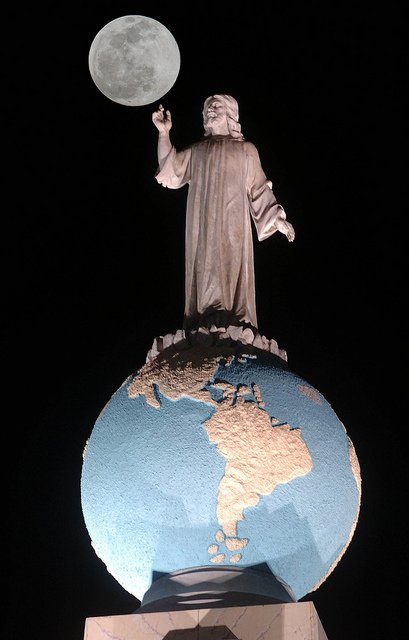
The iconic Jesus statue Monumento al Divino Salvador del Mundo, a landmark located in the country's capital, San Salvador.

Catholicism began in the nation in the sixteenth century with the arrival of Pedro de Alvarado. San Salvador was made an archdiocese on February 11, 1913 with Monsignor Antonio Adolfo Perez as first Archbishop. Prior to that date it had been under the jurisdiction of Guatemala. Archbishop Luis Chávez y González from 1939 to 1977 encouraged priests to study farming cooperatives and made efforts toward improving the poorest sectors of El Salvador (although in other respects he was a conservative who favored film censorship, staunchly opposed Communism, and was devoted to Pope Pius XII).

The governments have had a mixed relationship with the Catholic Church varying from friendly to anti-clerical. The most overtly Catholic-influenced political party might be the Partido Demócrata Cristiano with José Napoleón Duarte as one of its most noted founding members. The dealings of the government with the Catholic Church or Catholic organizations varied depending on the leadership of church or state at any given time. In modern times El Salvador is noted for having members linked to social and reform movements. At times these include followers of what's termed Liberation theology. The most well-known figure in the El Salvadoran church's history is Archbishop of San Salvador Óscar Romero. On March 24, 1980, during the civil war in El Salvador he was assassinated while saying Mass because of his positions regarding the government and demands to the end of the violence in the nation. In 2004 the Church in El Salvador asked for a reinvestigation of the case. A federal judge trying a conspiracy count against a former Salvadoran military officer termed Romero's killing "a crime against humanity."

Despite that, most of the church in El Salvador is more conservative than this and had no sympathy to the rebels during the civil war. Fernando Sáenz Lacalle, originally of Opus Dei, is the current Archbishop of San Salvador. He is in general an opponent of Liberation theology and his appointment in 1995 was viewed with disdain by followers of that controversial school of thought. He has been active in charitable work for earthquake victims and outspoken against violence.

El Salvador's first and only Cardinal, Gregorio Rosa Chavez, was an Auxiliary Bishop to the Archbishop of San Salvador Jose Luis Escobar Alas, was appointed by Pope Francis. He retired in October 2022.

== Churches of El Salvador ==
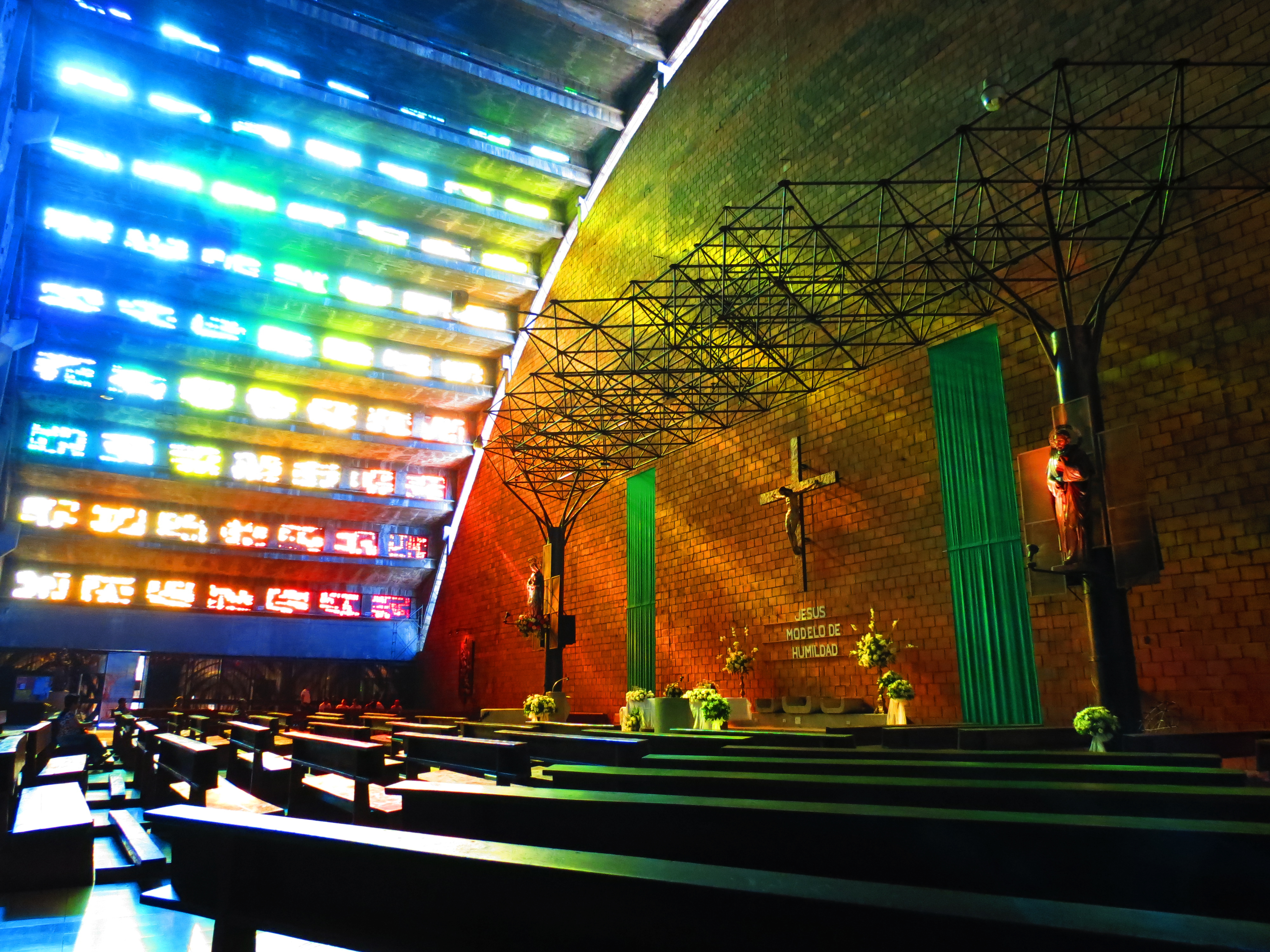
Iglesia El Rosario, San Salvador

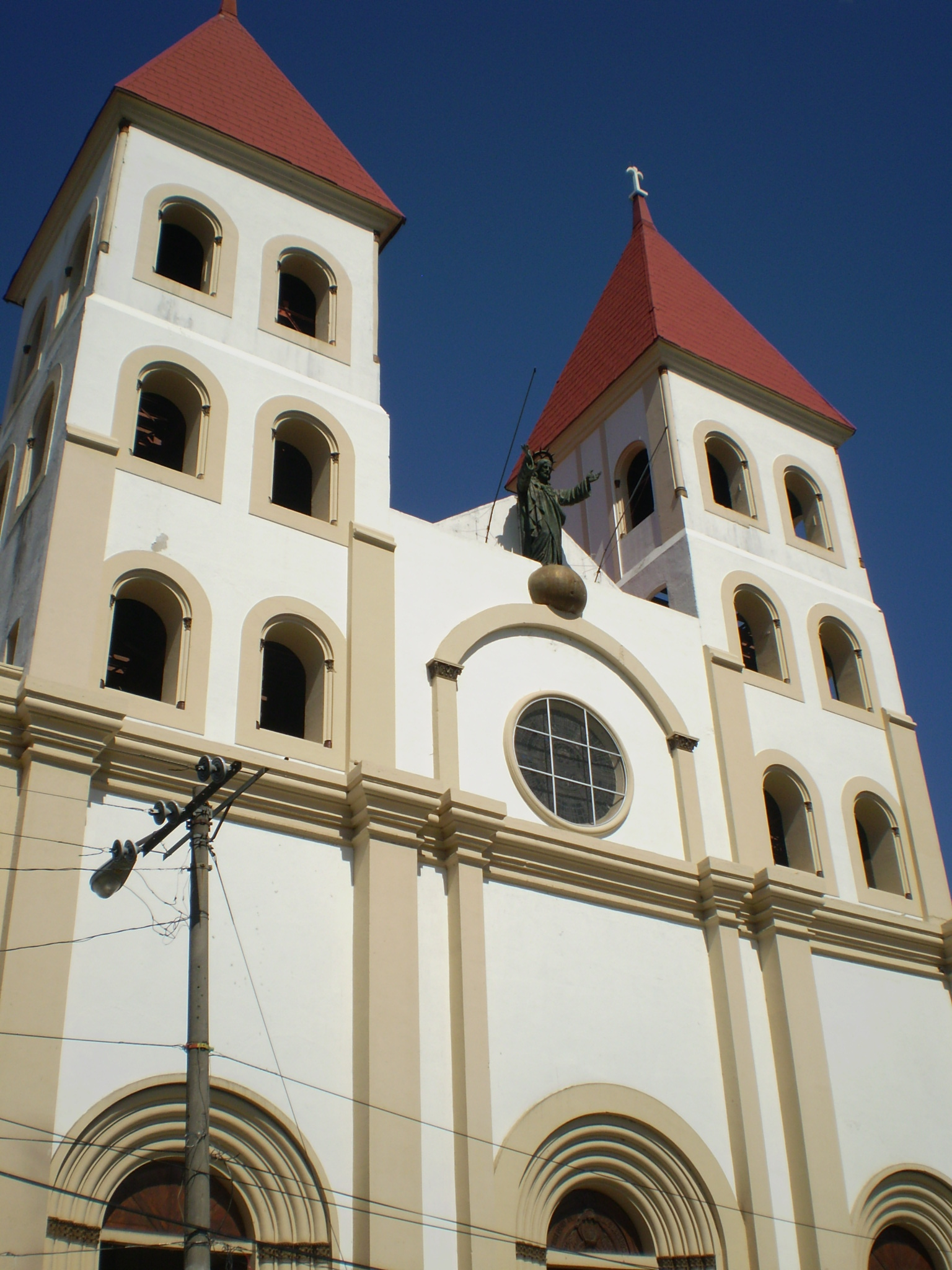
Cathedral Basilica of Queen of Peace, San Miguel

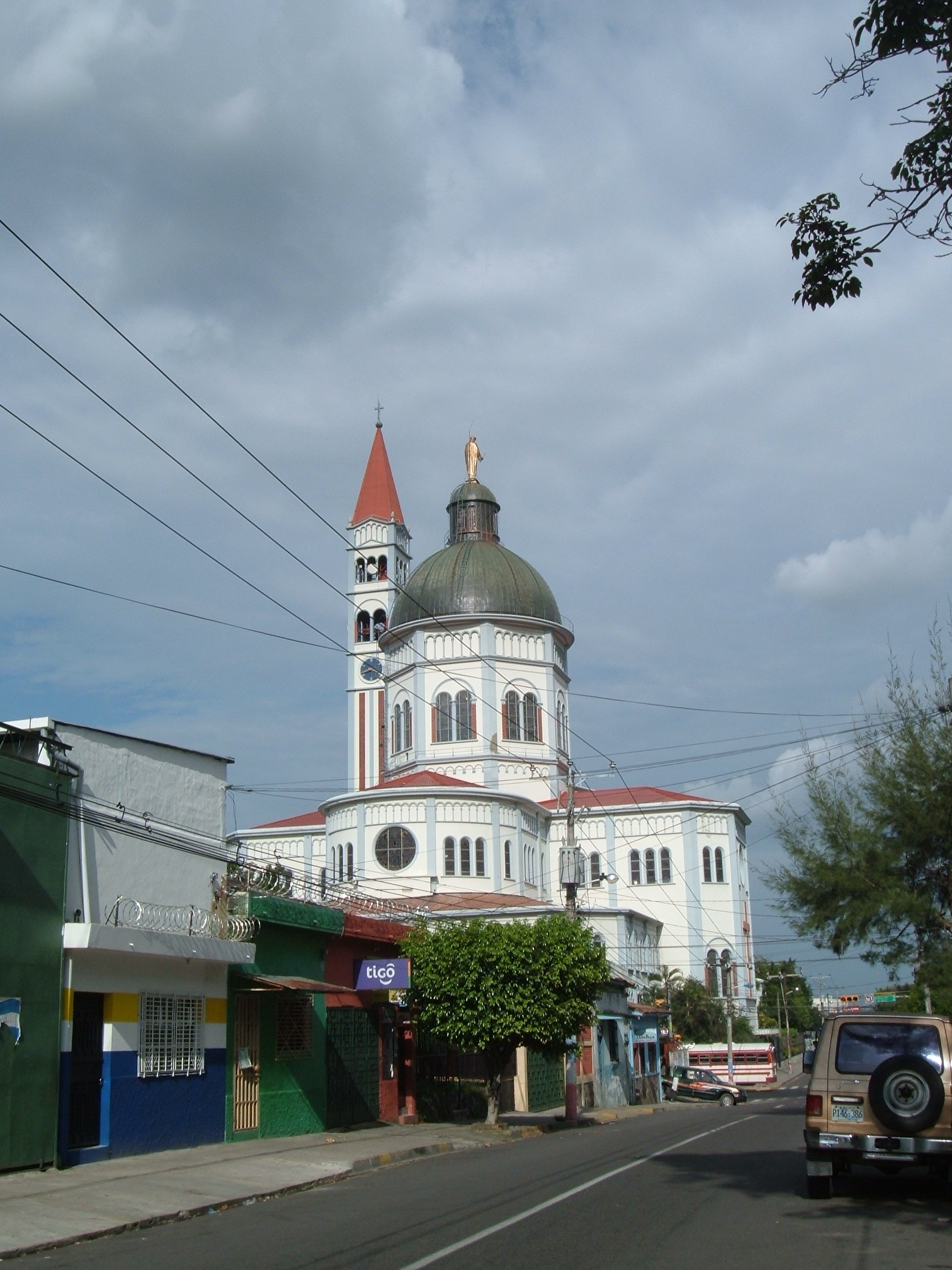
Iglesia Don Rua, San Salvador

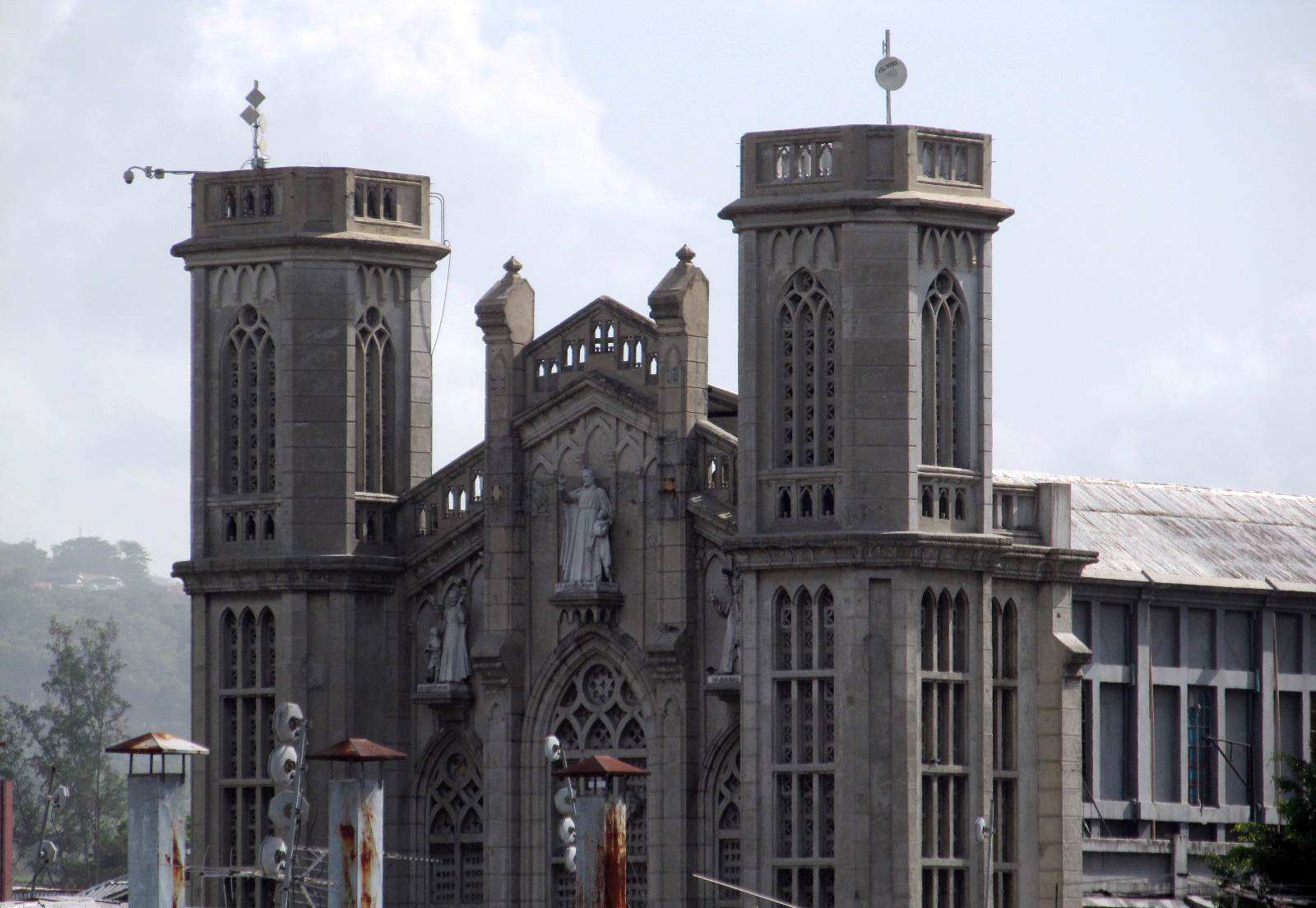
Iglesia El Calvario, San Salvador

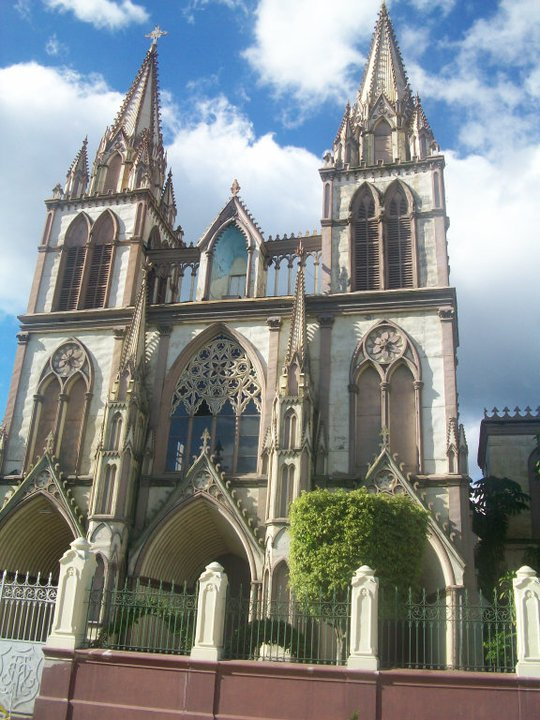
Iglesia El Carmen, San Salvador

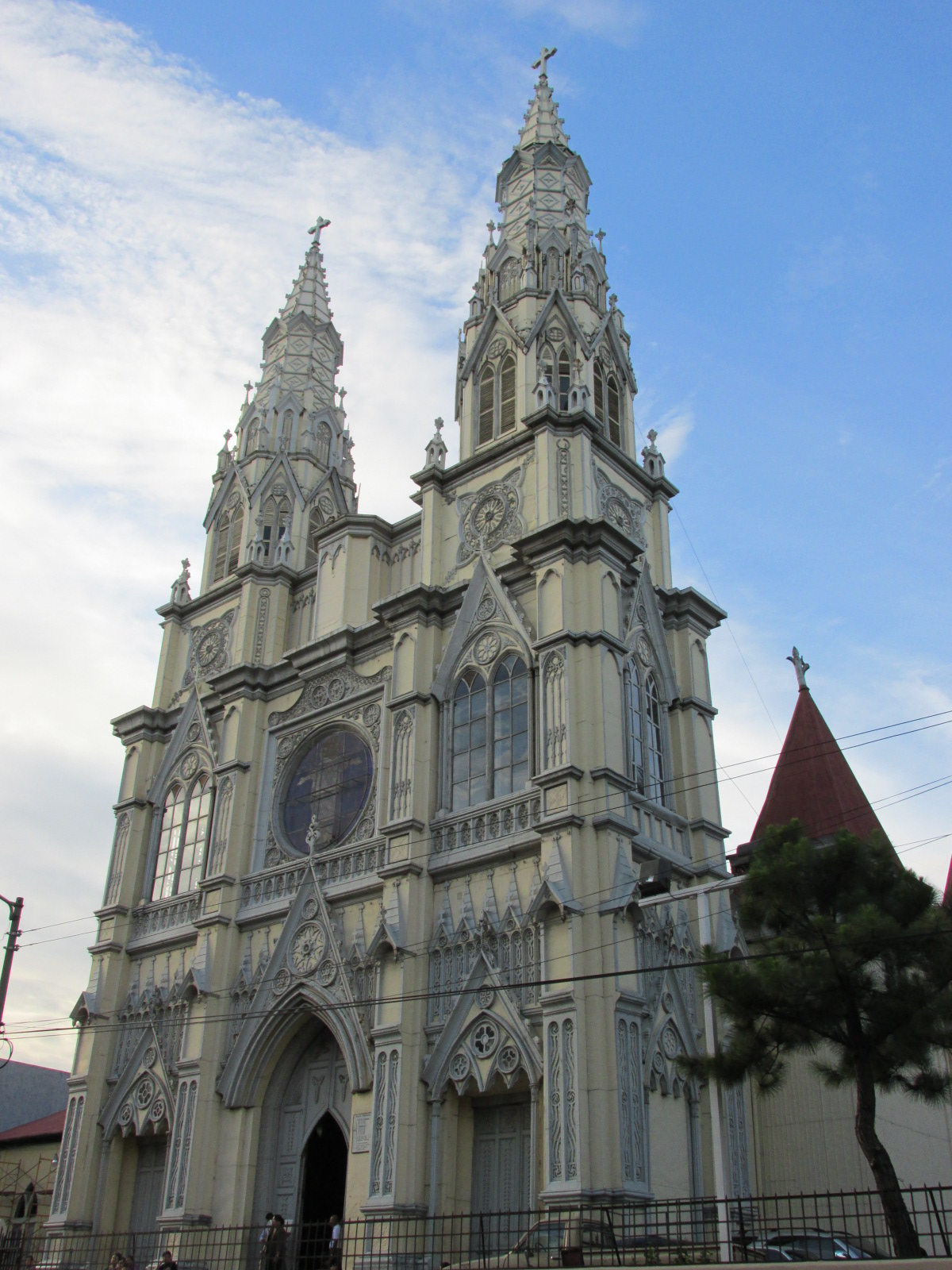
Basílica del Sagrado Corazón de Jesús, San Salvador

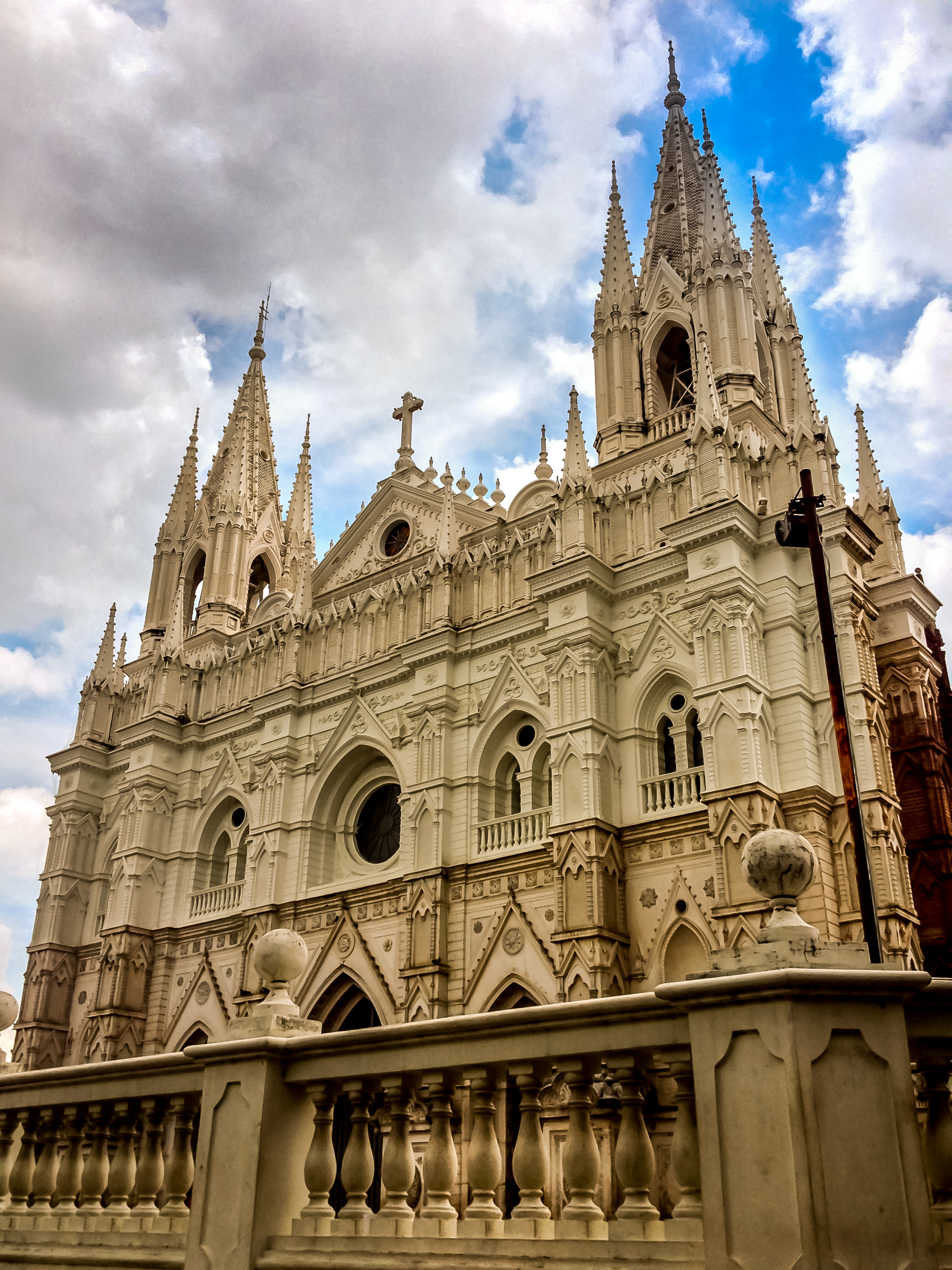
Santa Ana Cathedral, El Salvador

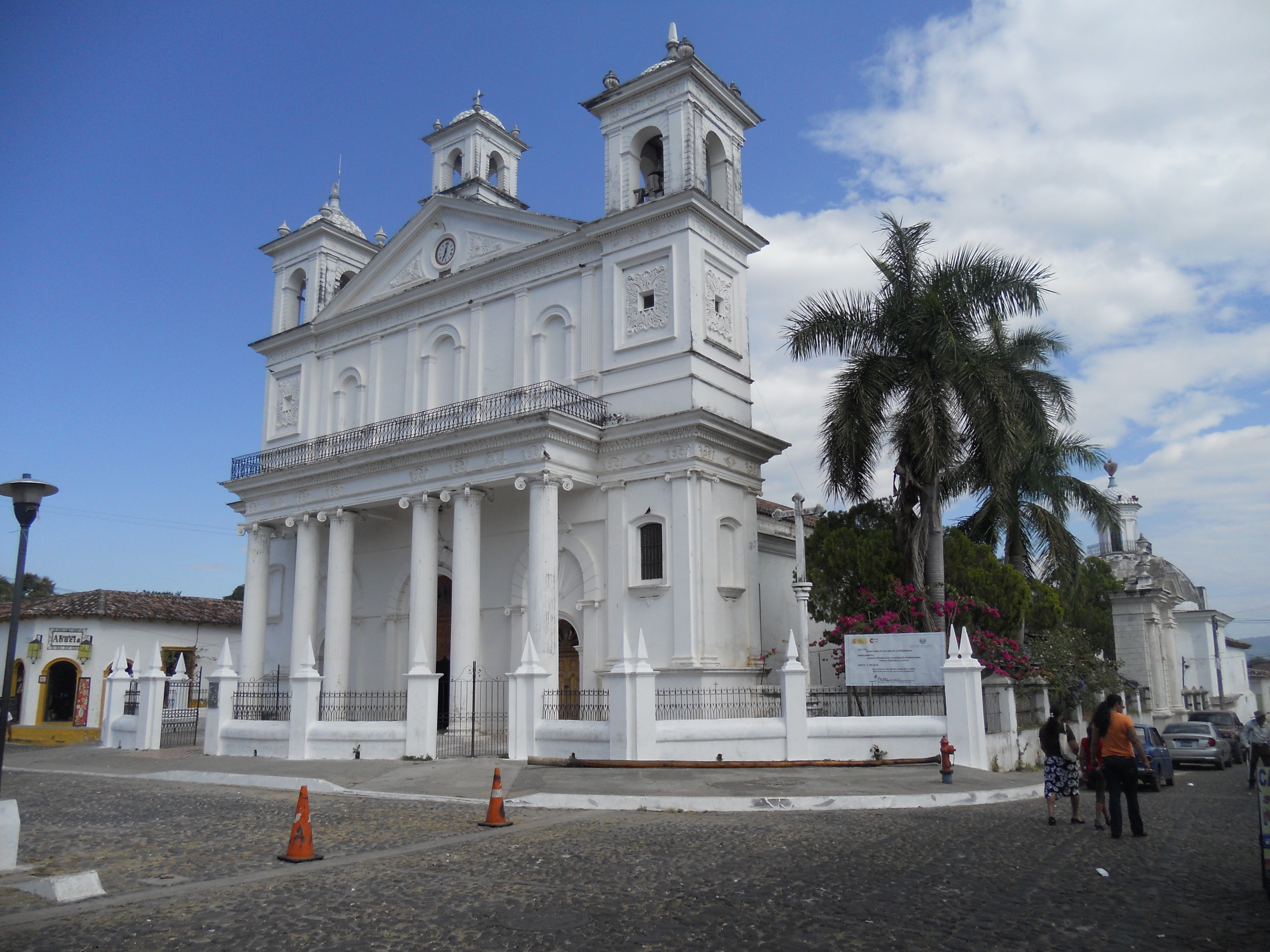
Iglesia Santa Lucía, Suchitoto

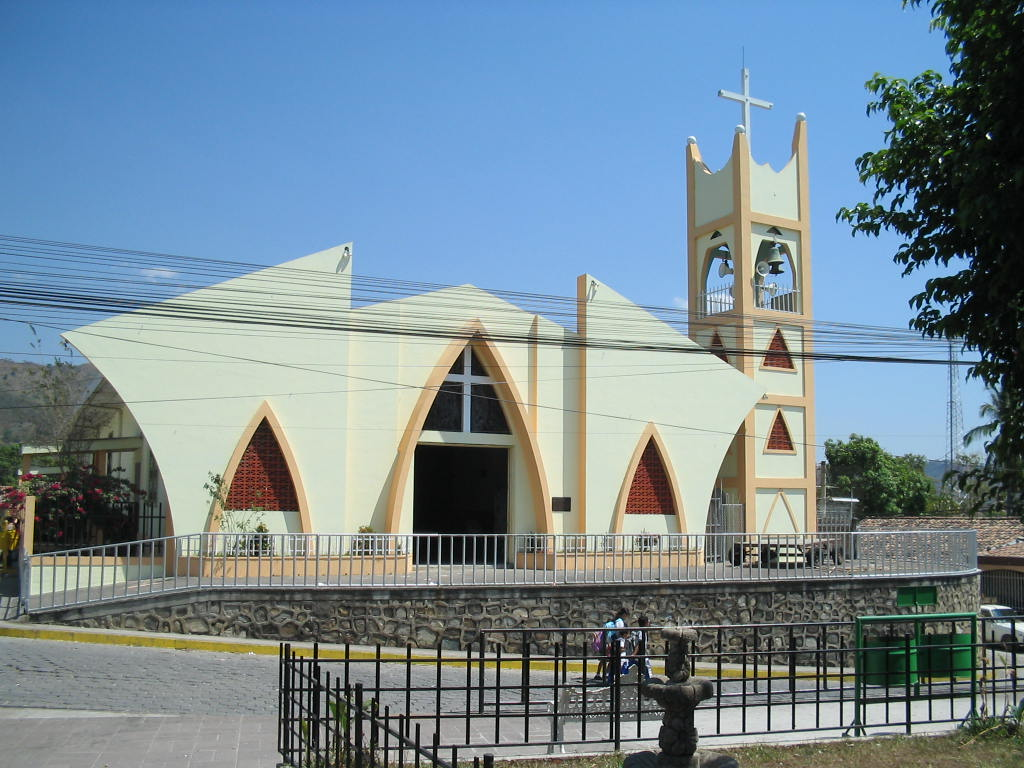
Church in Dulce Nombre de María

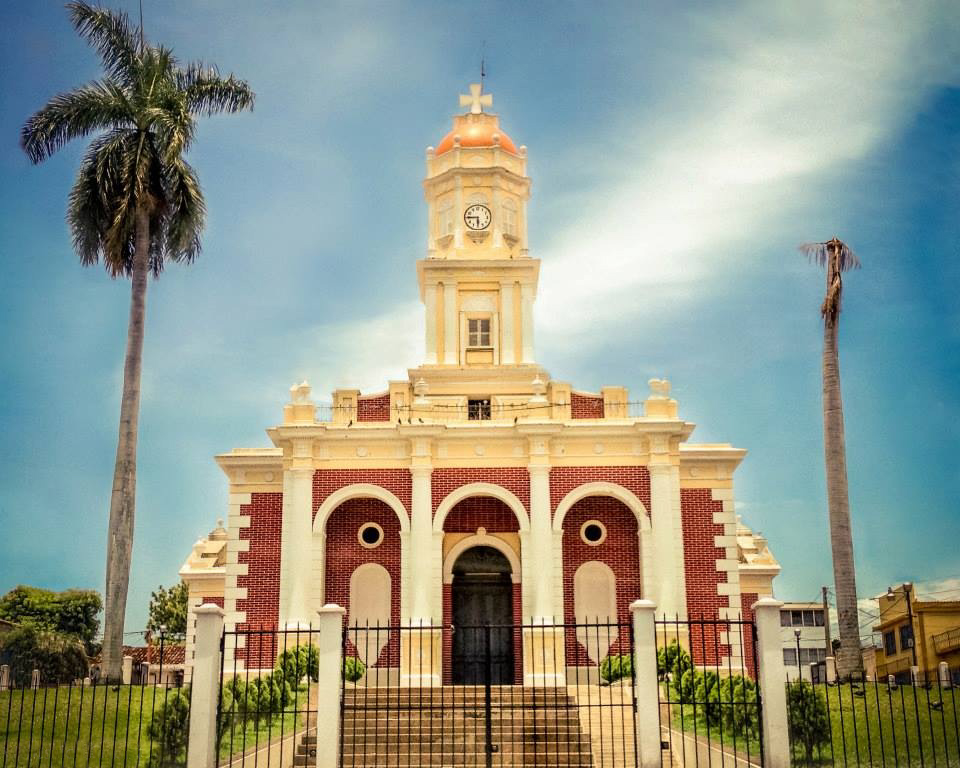
Iglesia El Carmen, Santa Ana, El Salvador

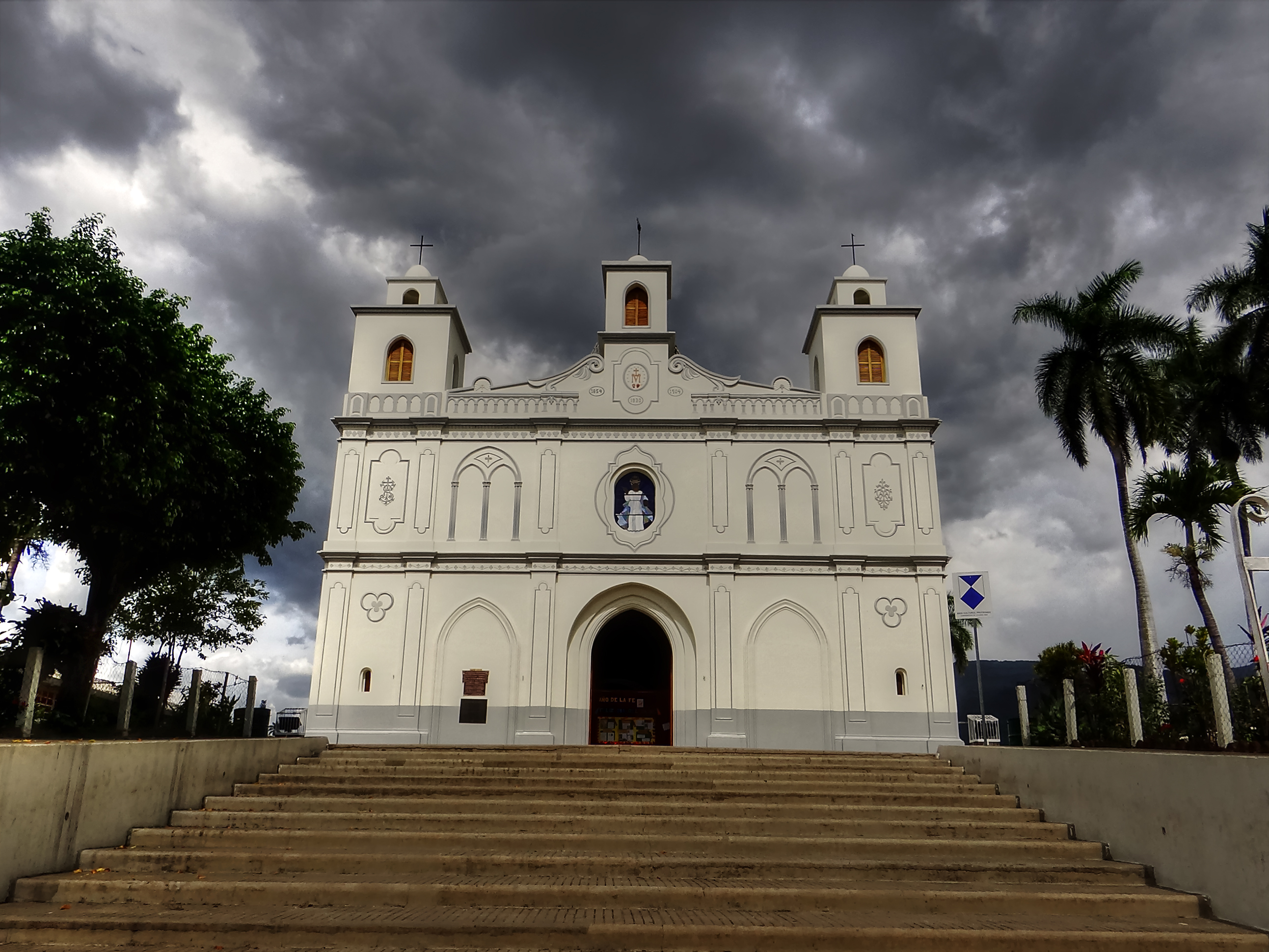
Iglesia Nuestra Señora de la Asunción, Ahuachapán

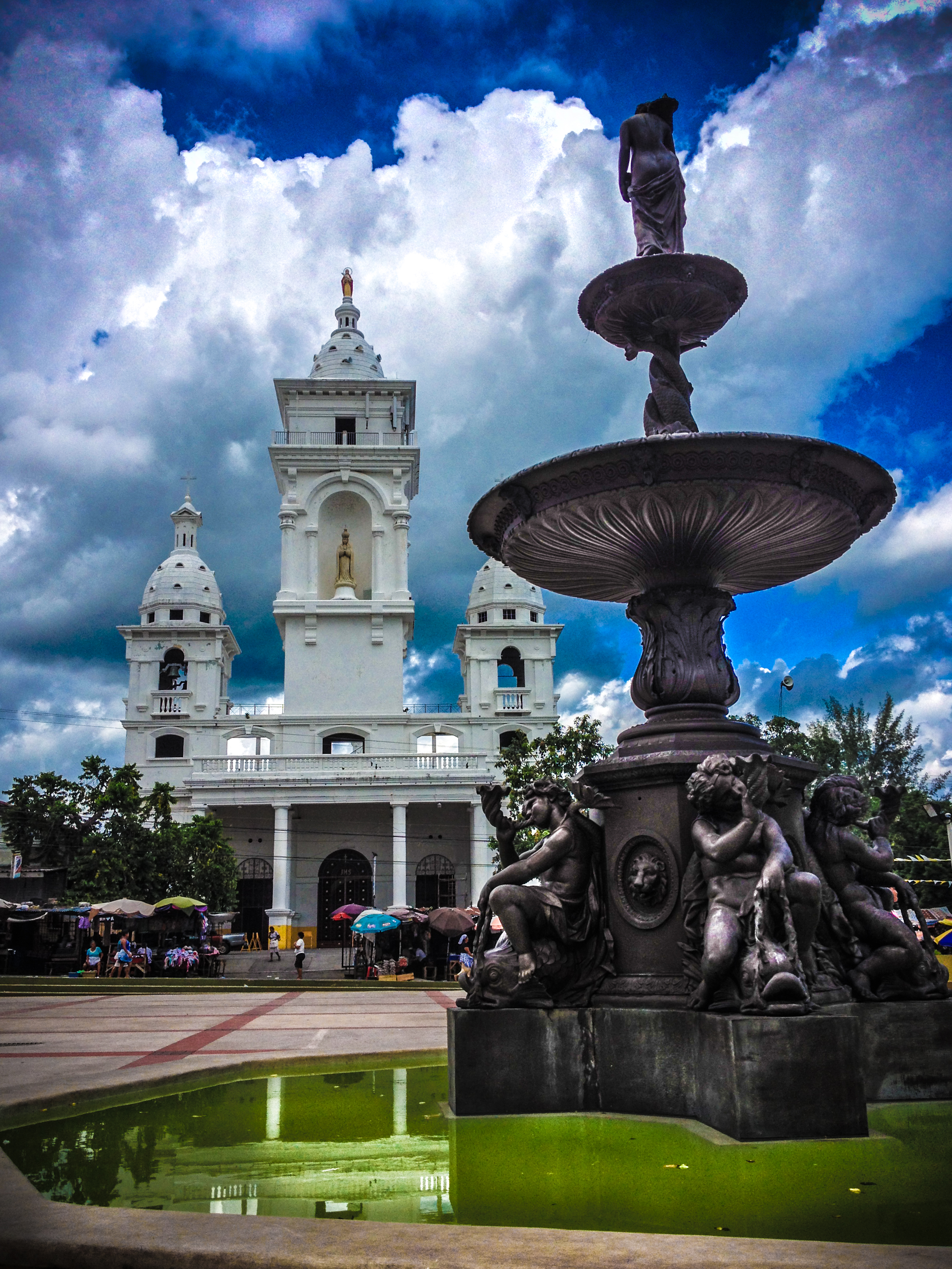
Our Lady of the Poor Cathedral, Zacatecoluca

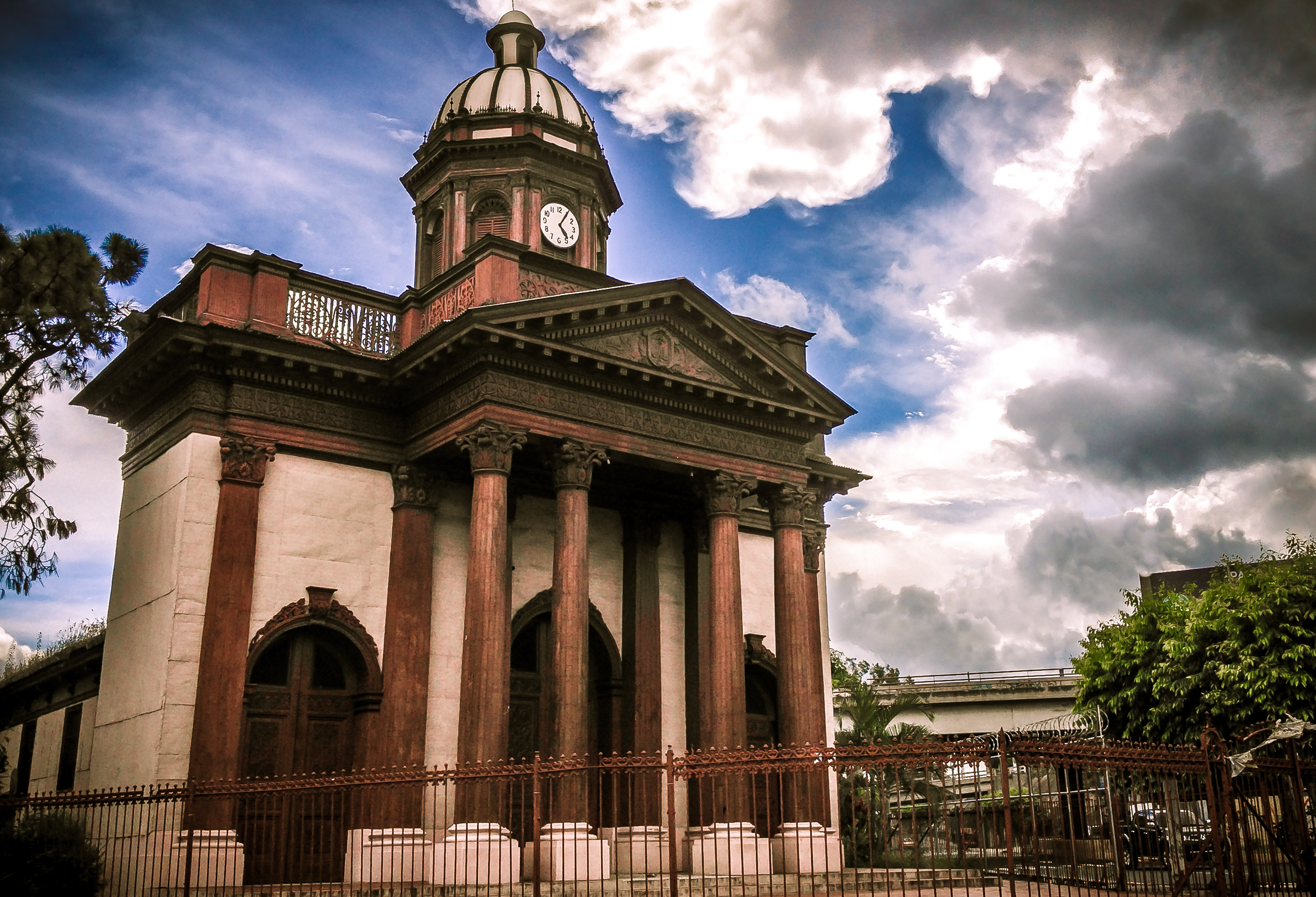
Iglesia Nuestra Señora de Candelaria, San Salvador Department

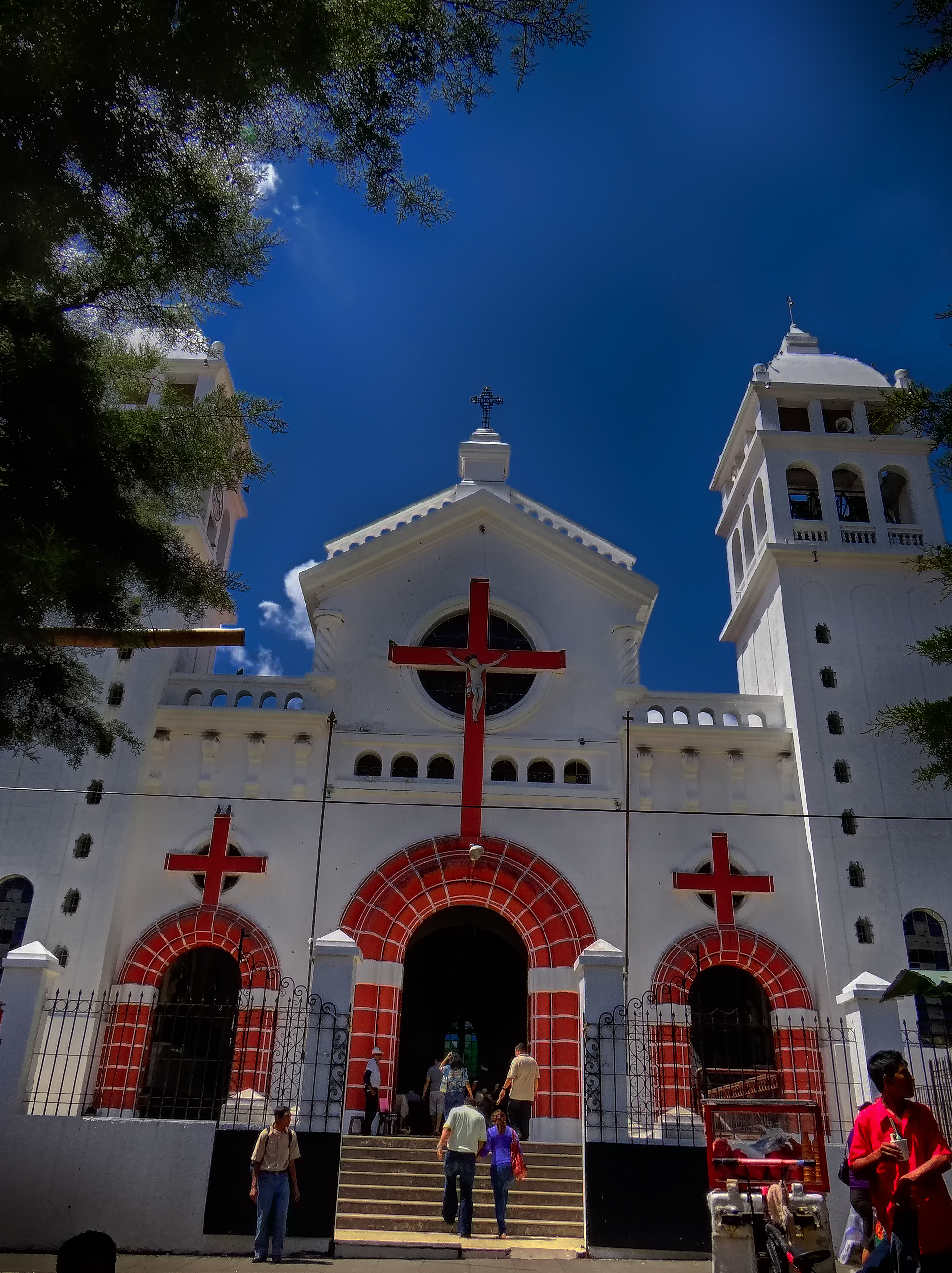
Iglesia del Cristo Negro, Juayua

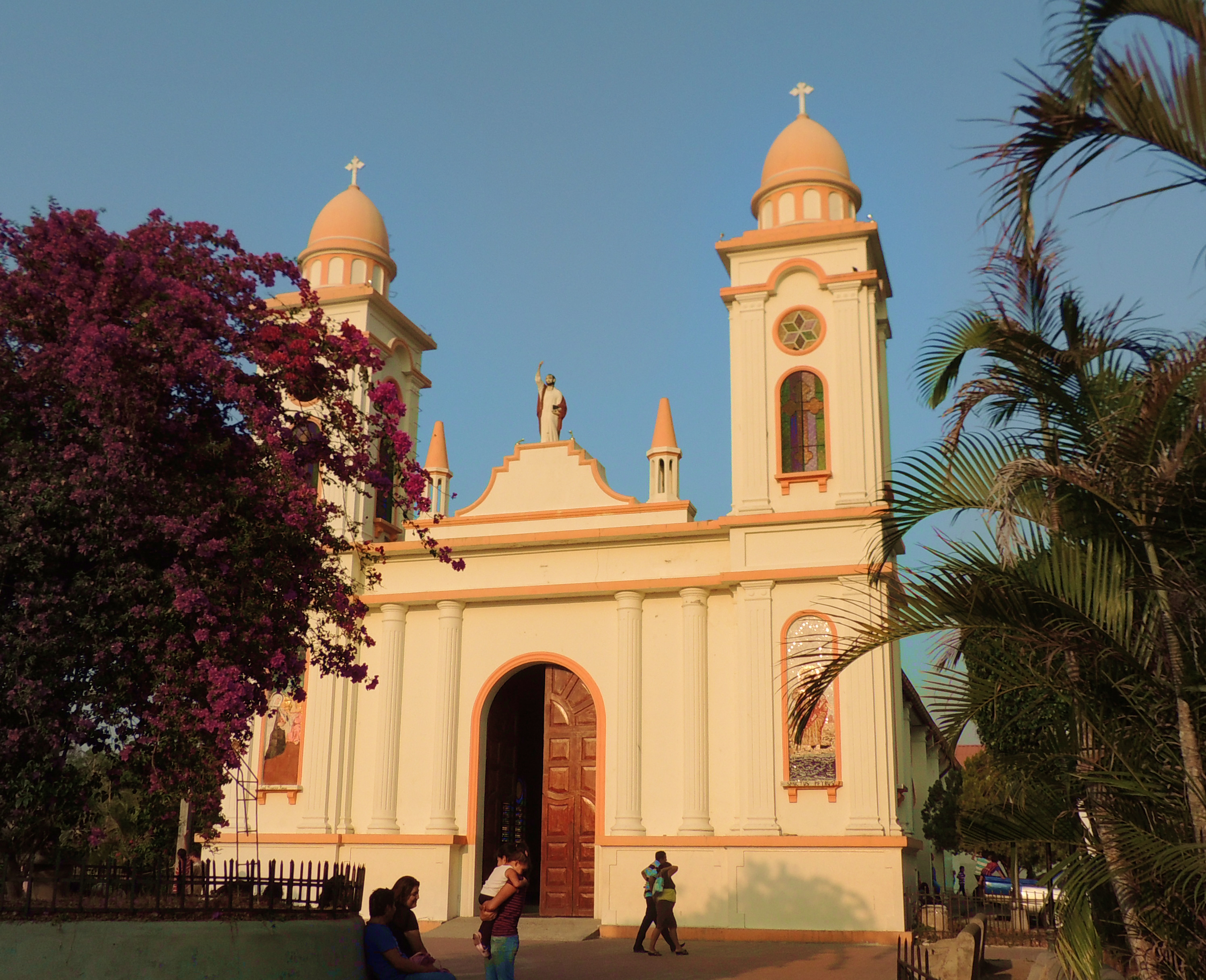
Iglesia de San Pedro Perulapán

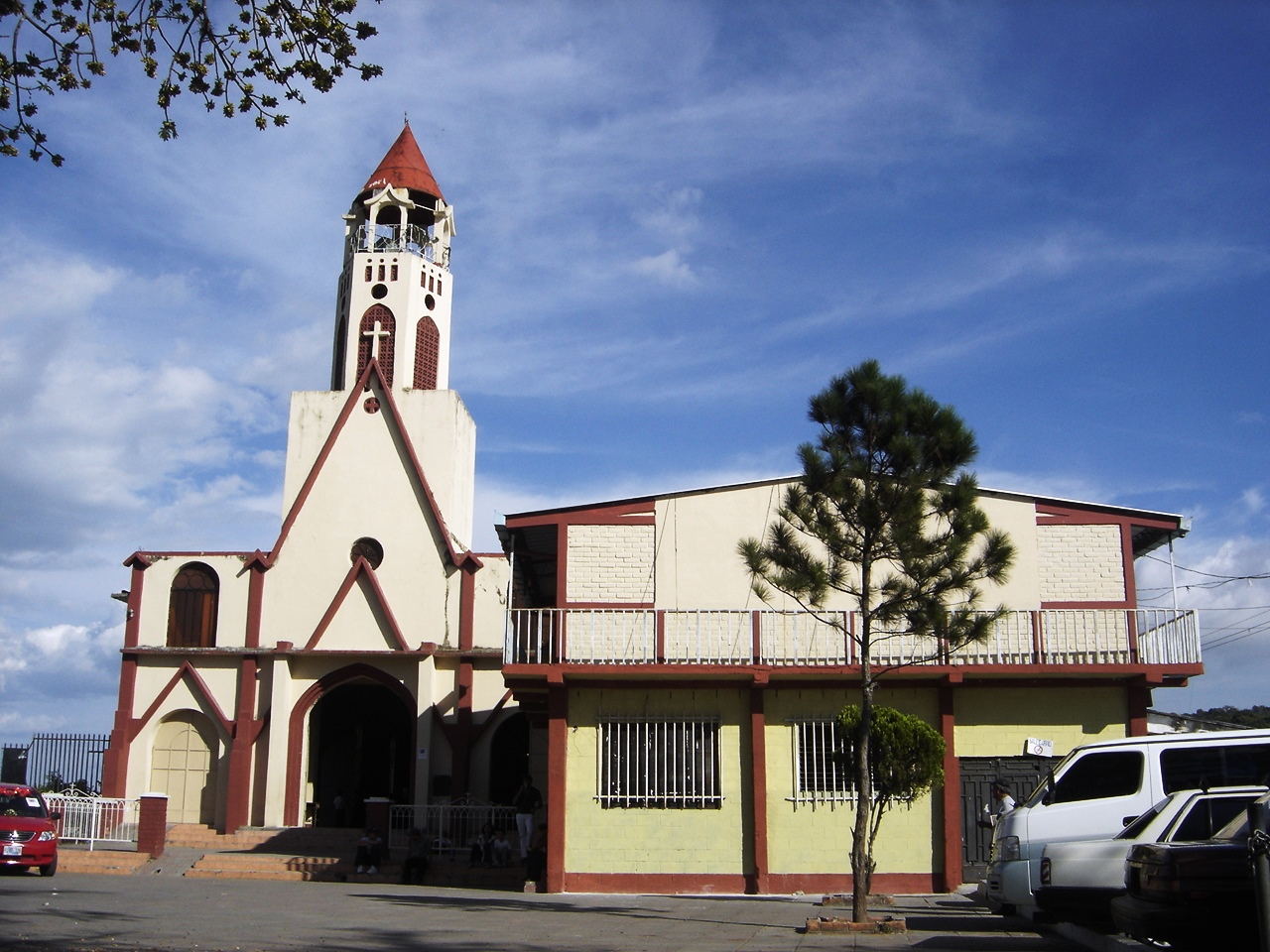
Iglesia Parroquial de Santiago Apostol, Santiago Texacuangos, San Salvador Department

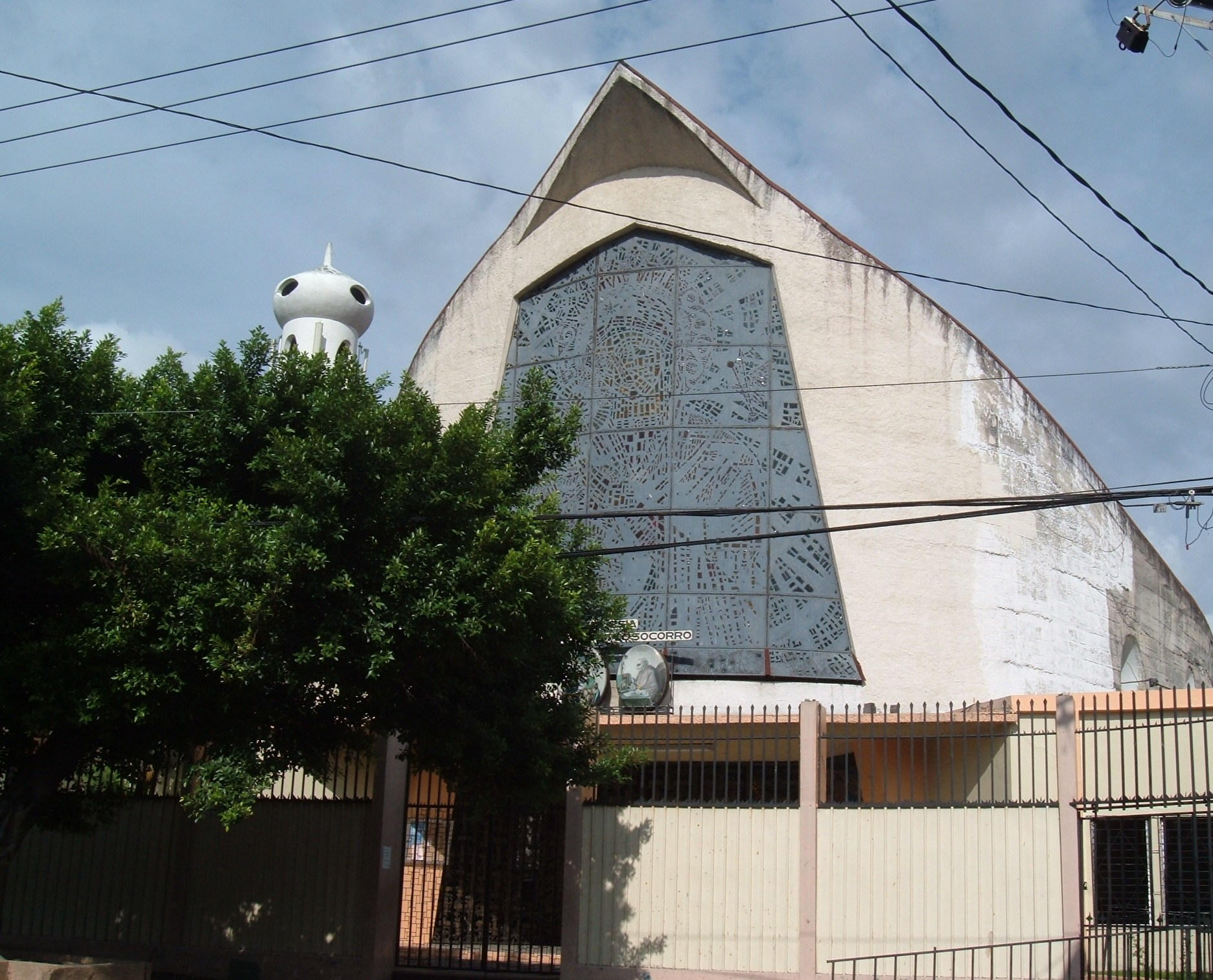
Iglesia del Perpetuo Socorro, San Salvador

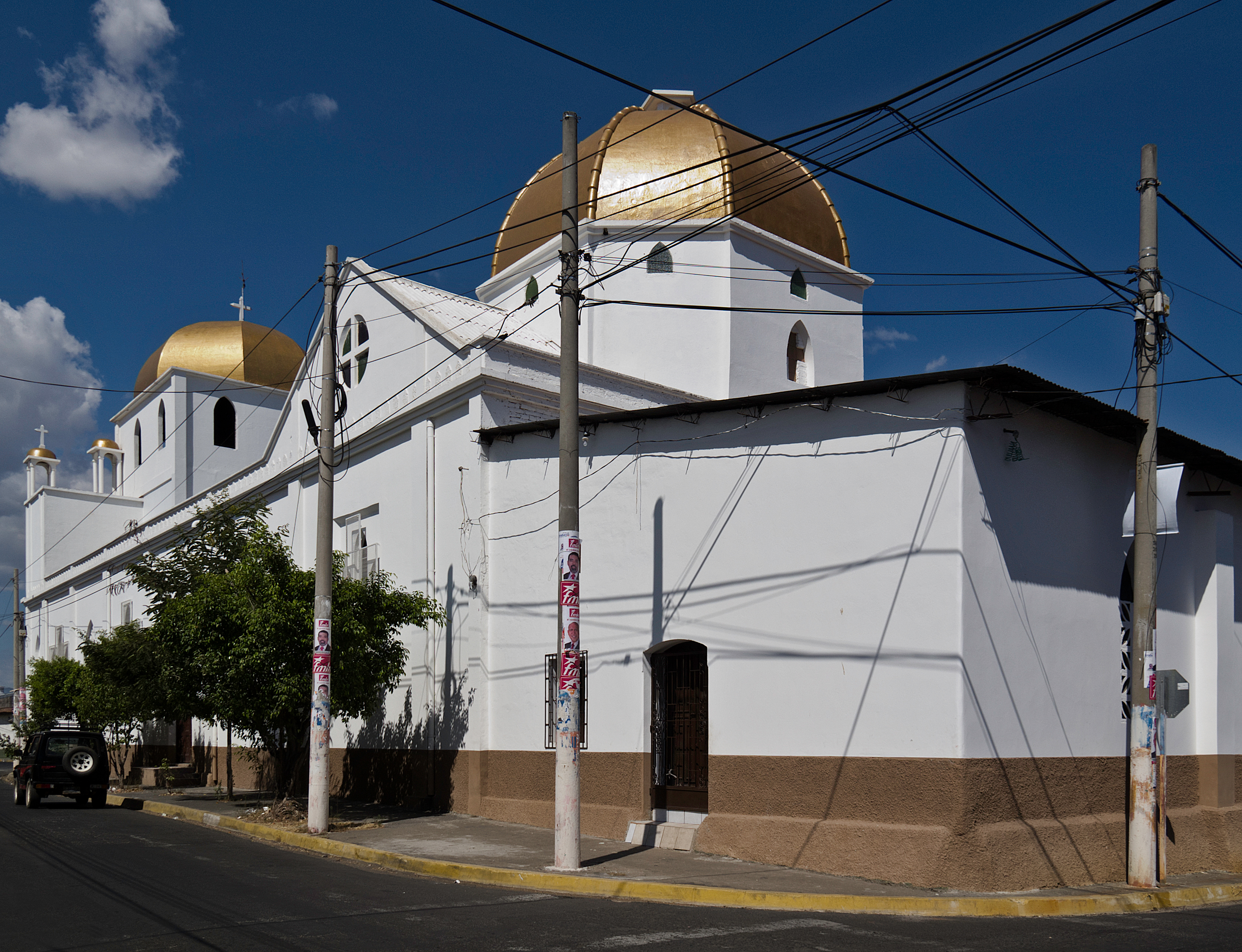
Iglesia El Calvario San Miguel, San Miguel, El Salvador

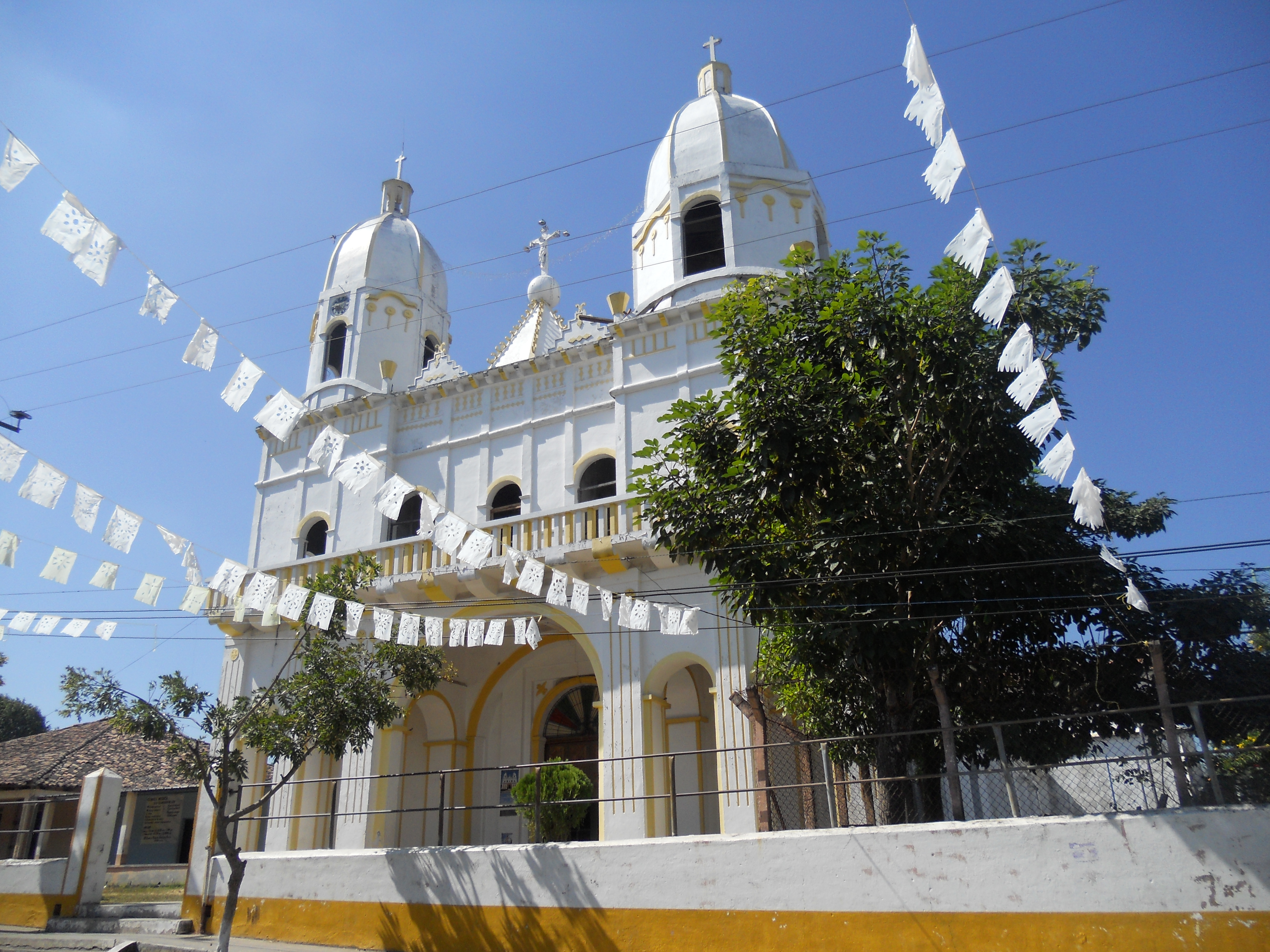
Iglesia Parroquial de San José Guayabal

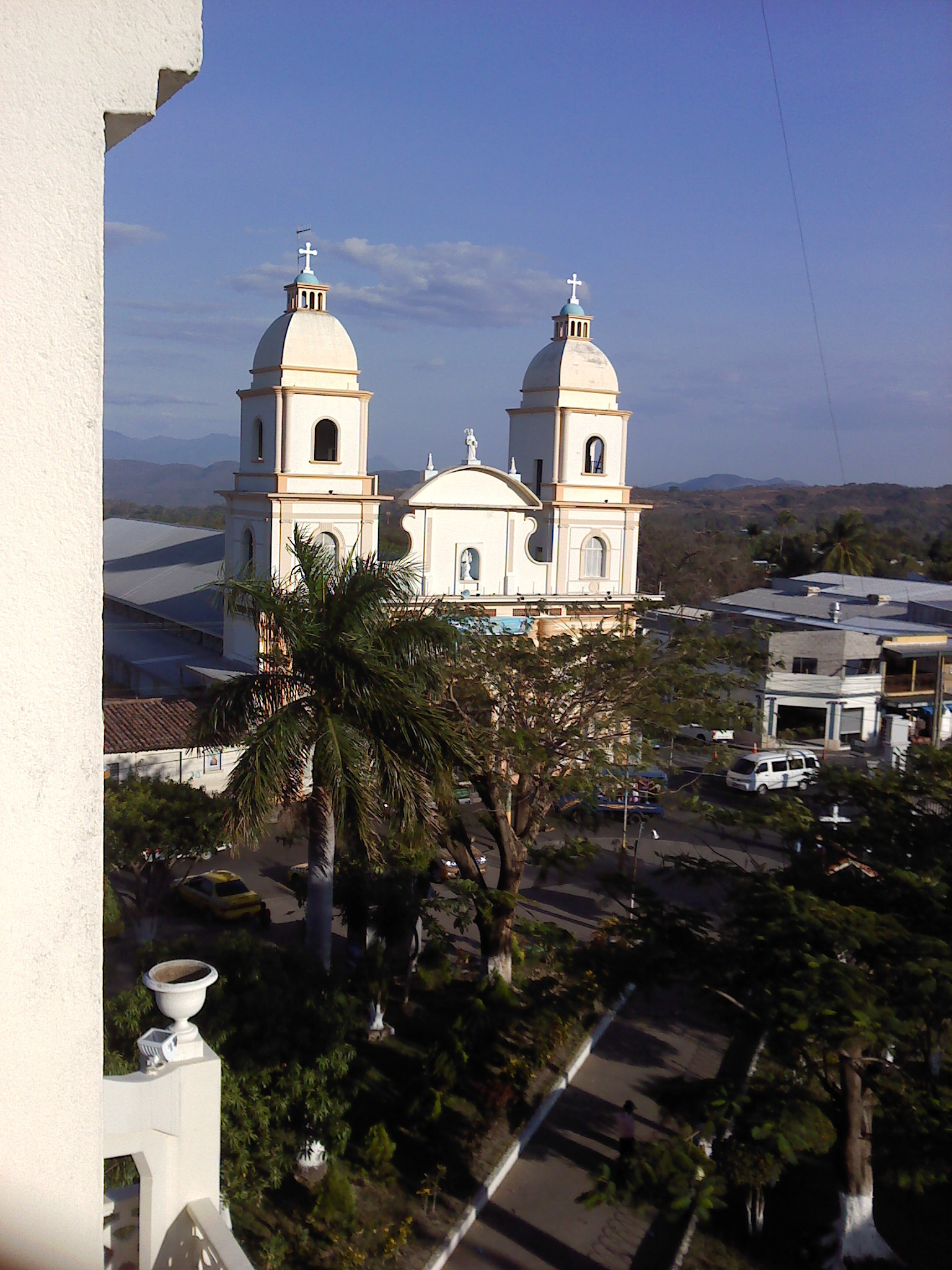
San Vicente Cathedral, El Salvador

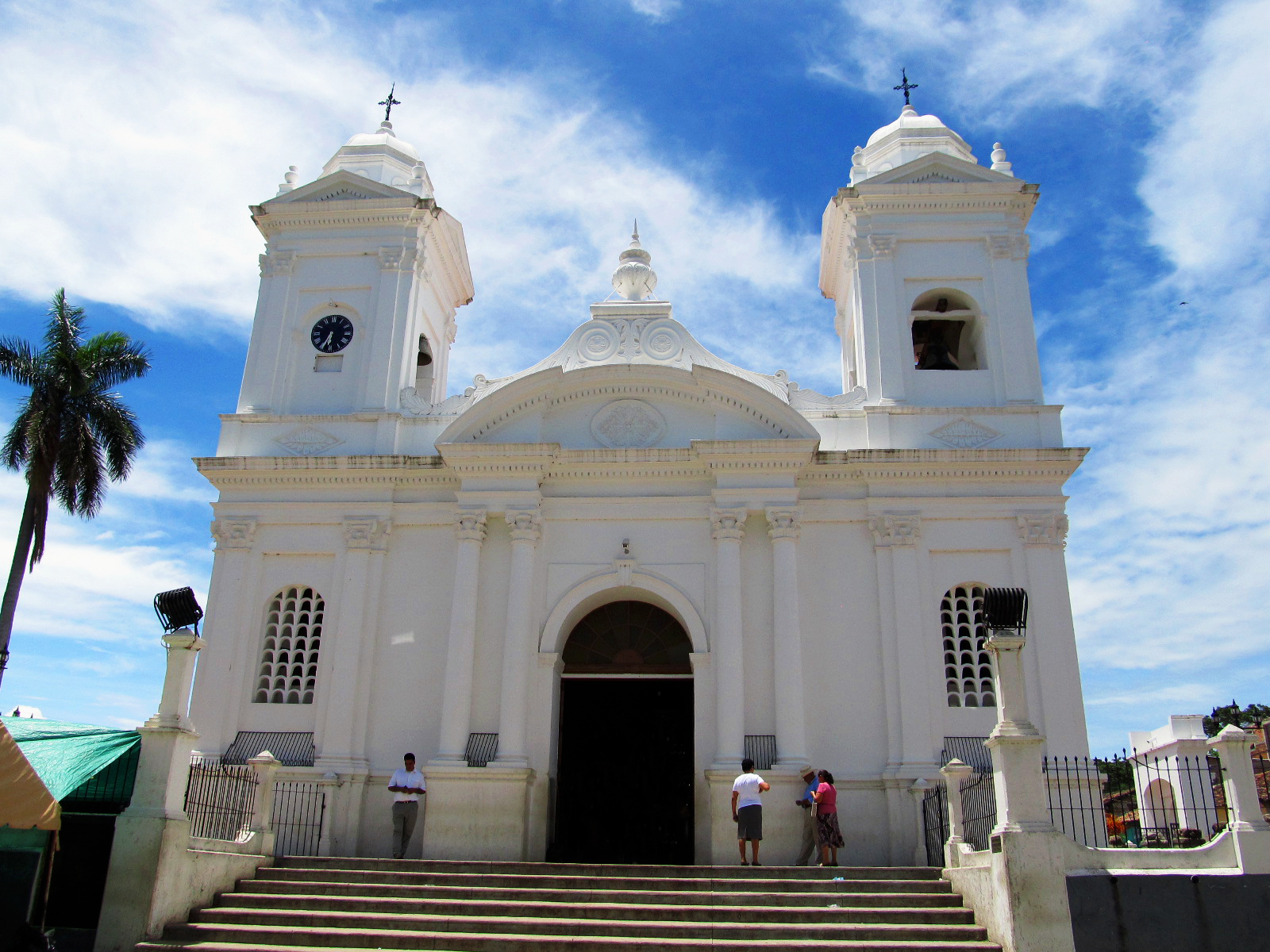
Iglesia Parroquial San Miguel Arcangel in Ilobasco

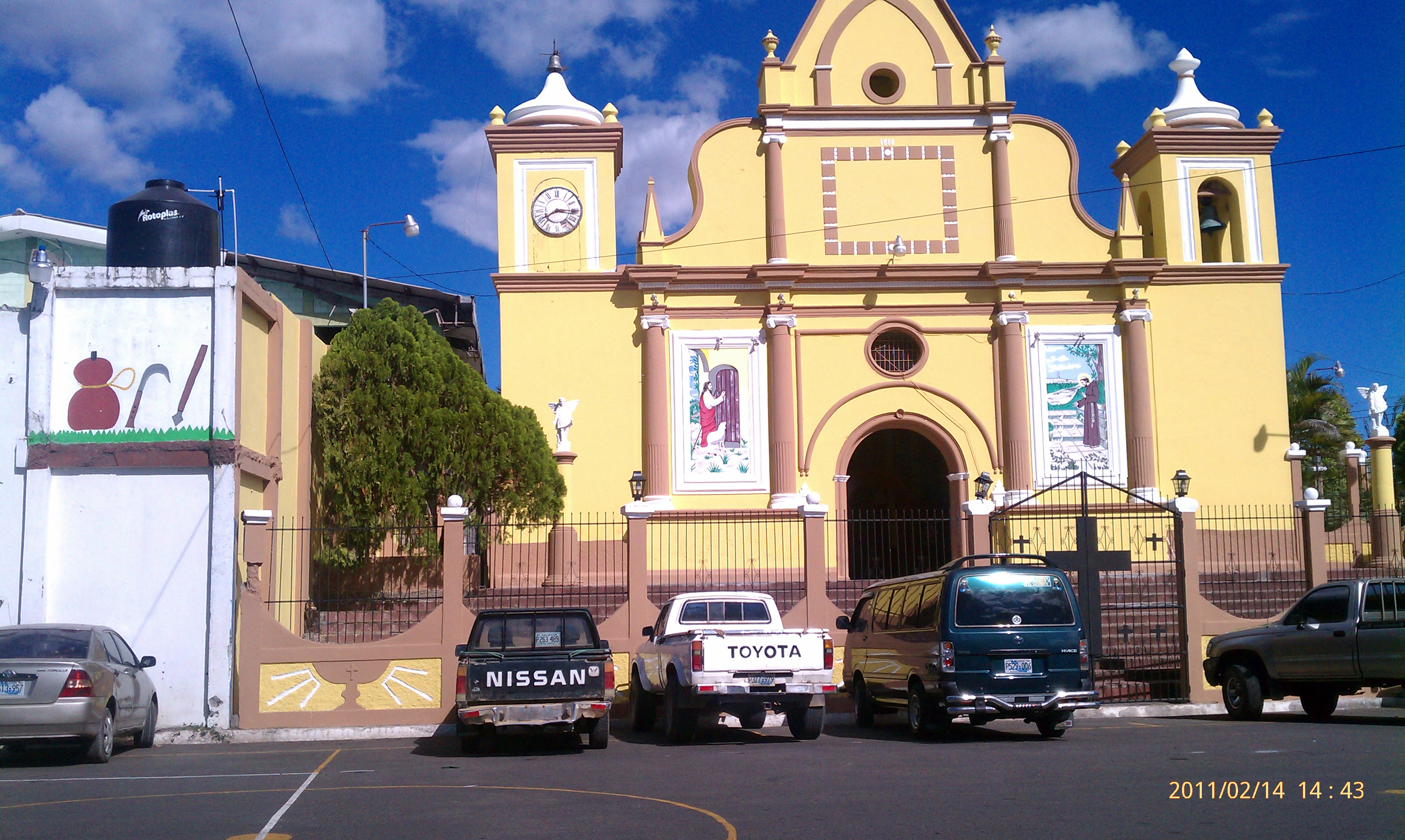
Iglesia San Francisco Gotera

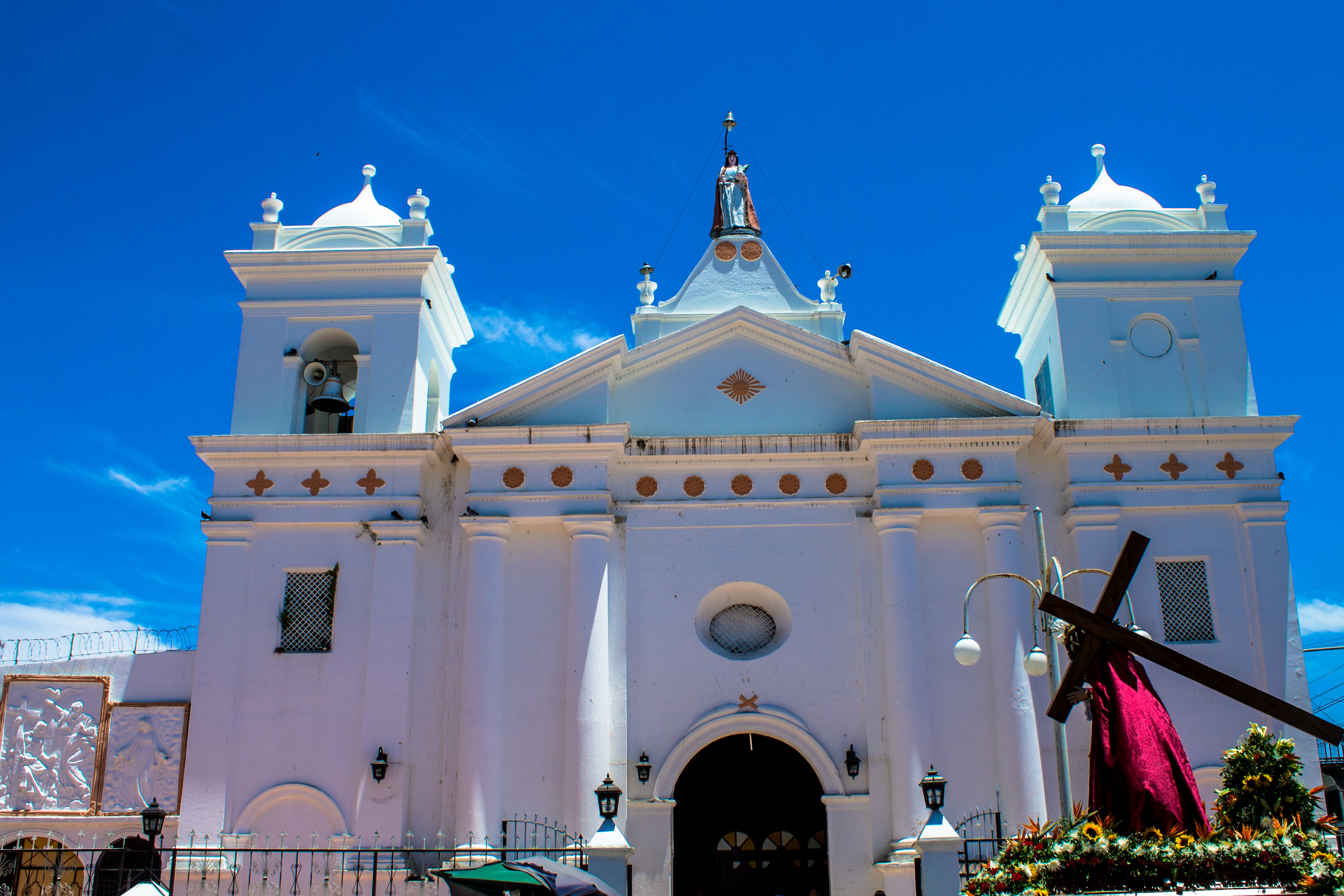
Iglesia Santa Barbara en Sensuntepeque

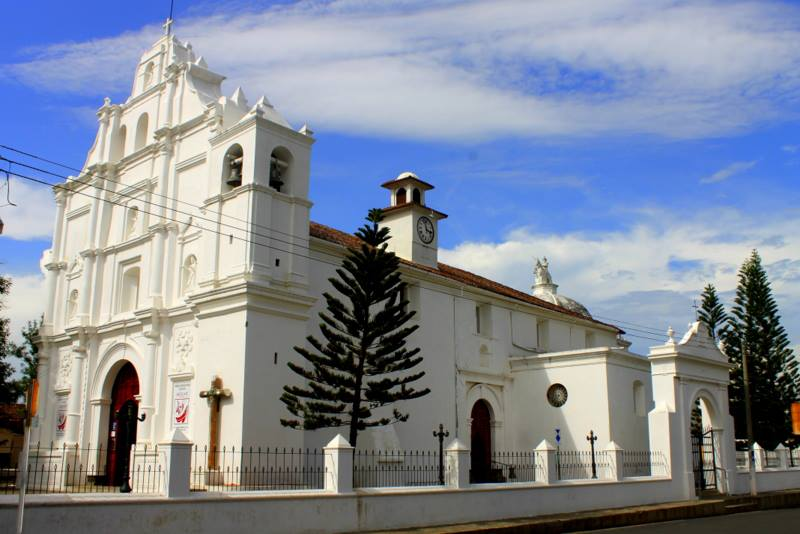
Parroquia Santiago Apostol, Chalchuapa

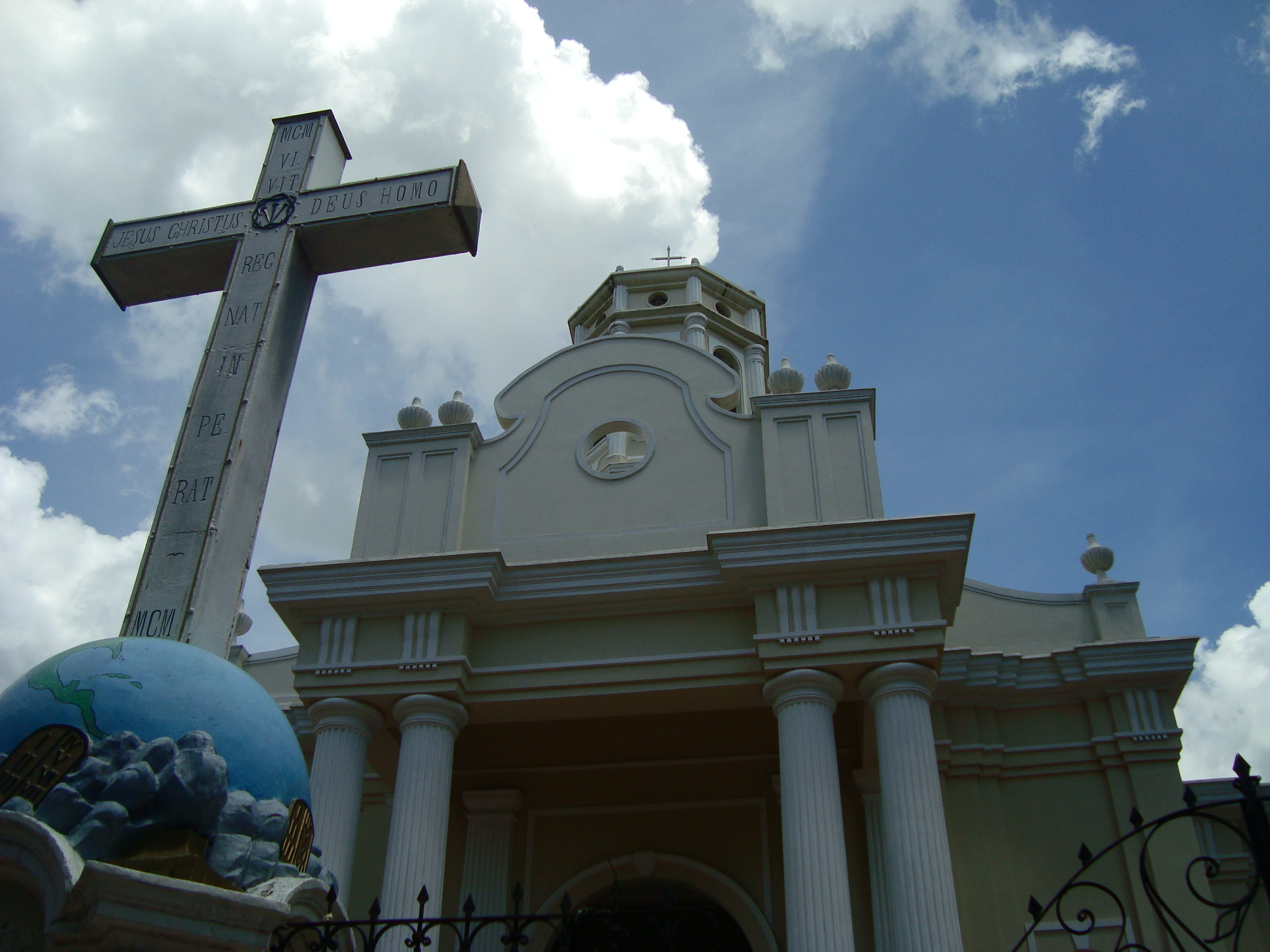
Iglesia el Calvario, Santa Ana, El Salvador

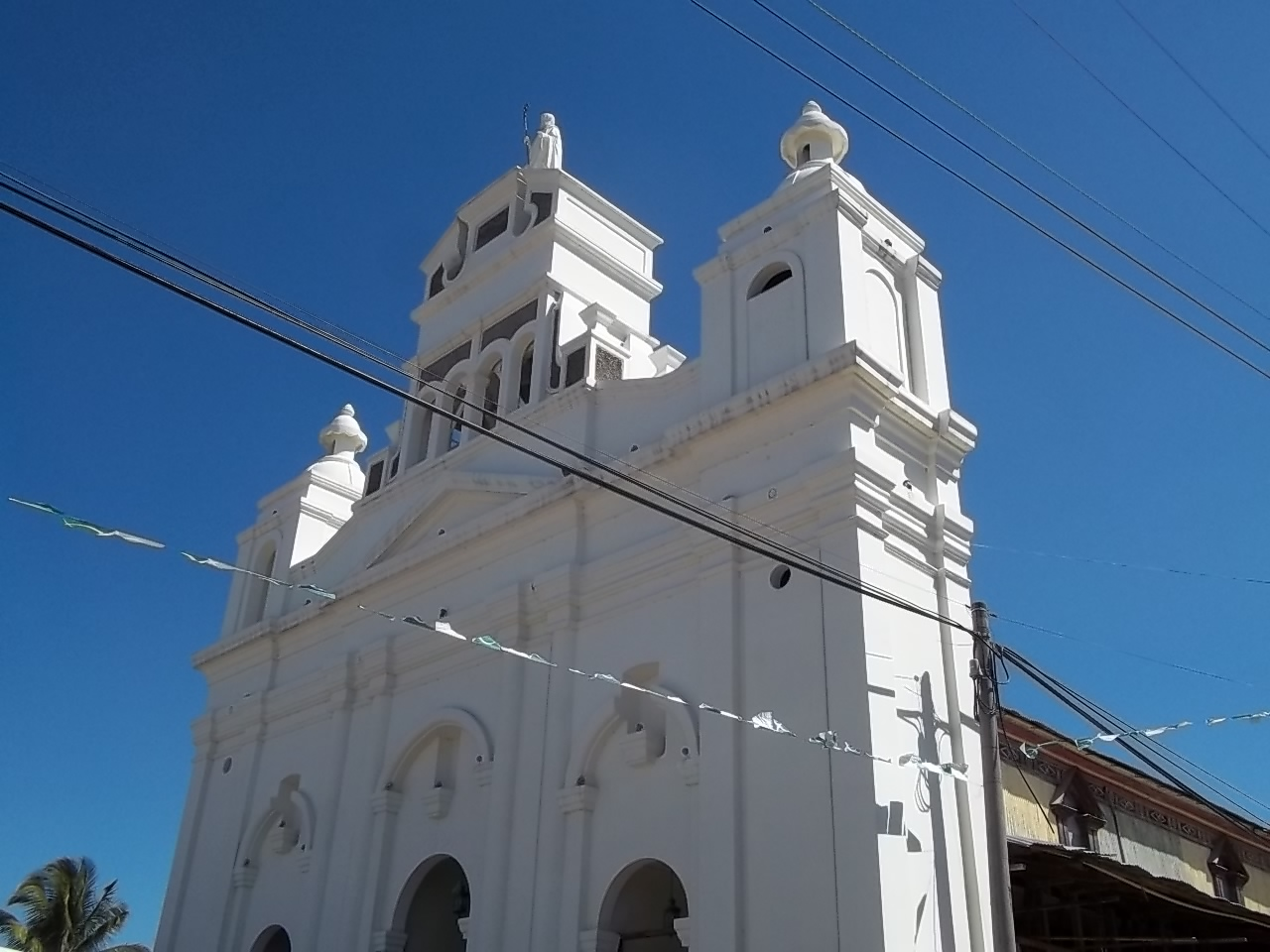
Iglesia de San Pedro Nonualco

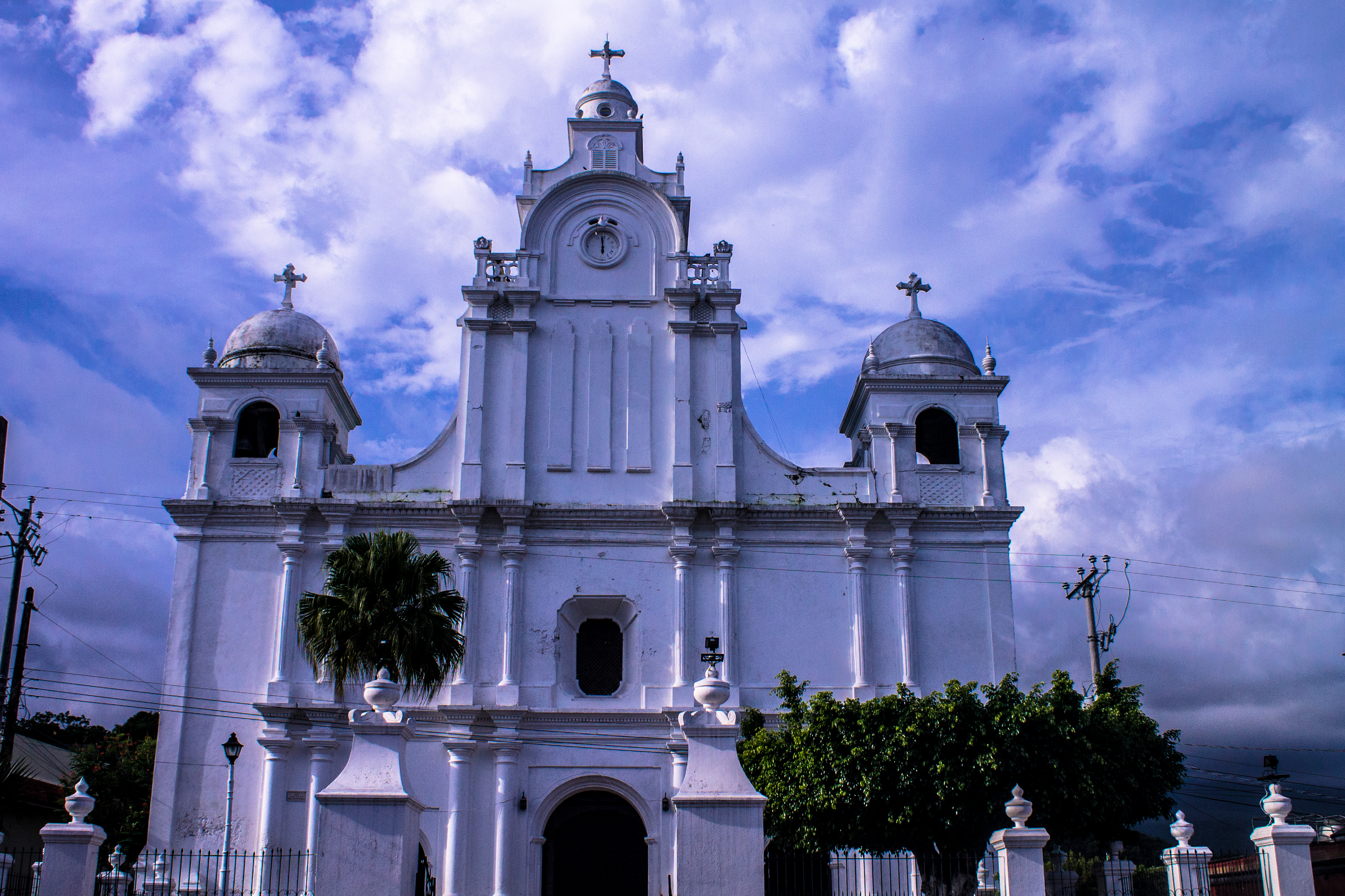
Iglesia de la Parroquia Nuestra Señora de los Dolores Izalco

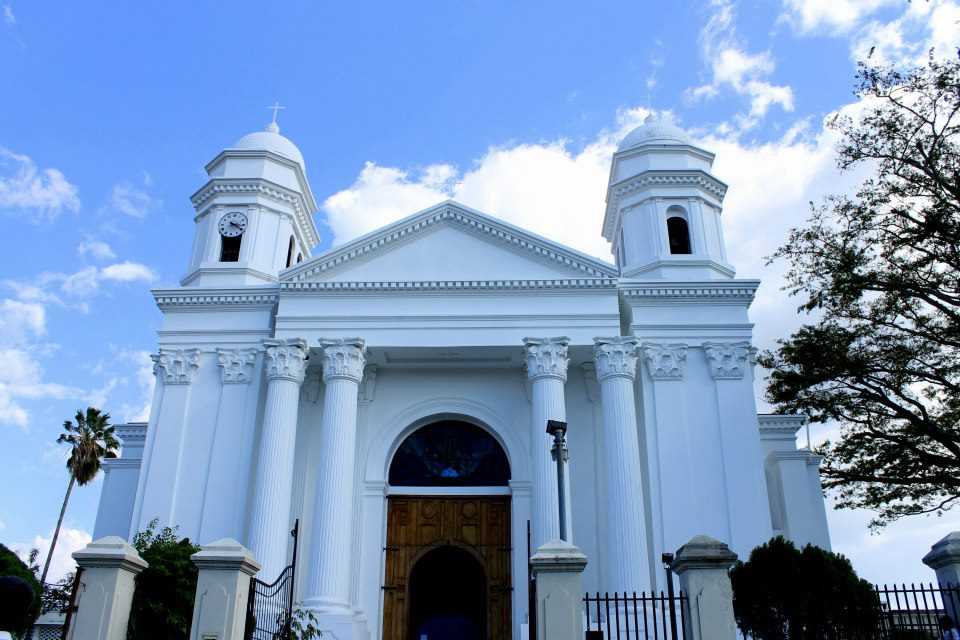
Sonsonate Cathedral

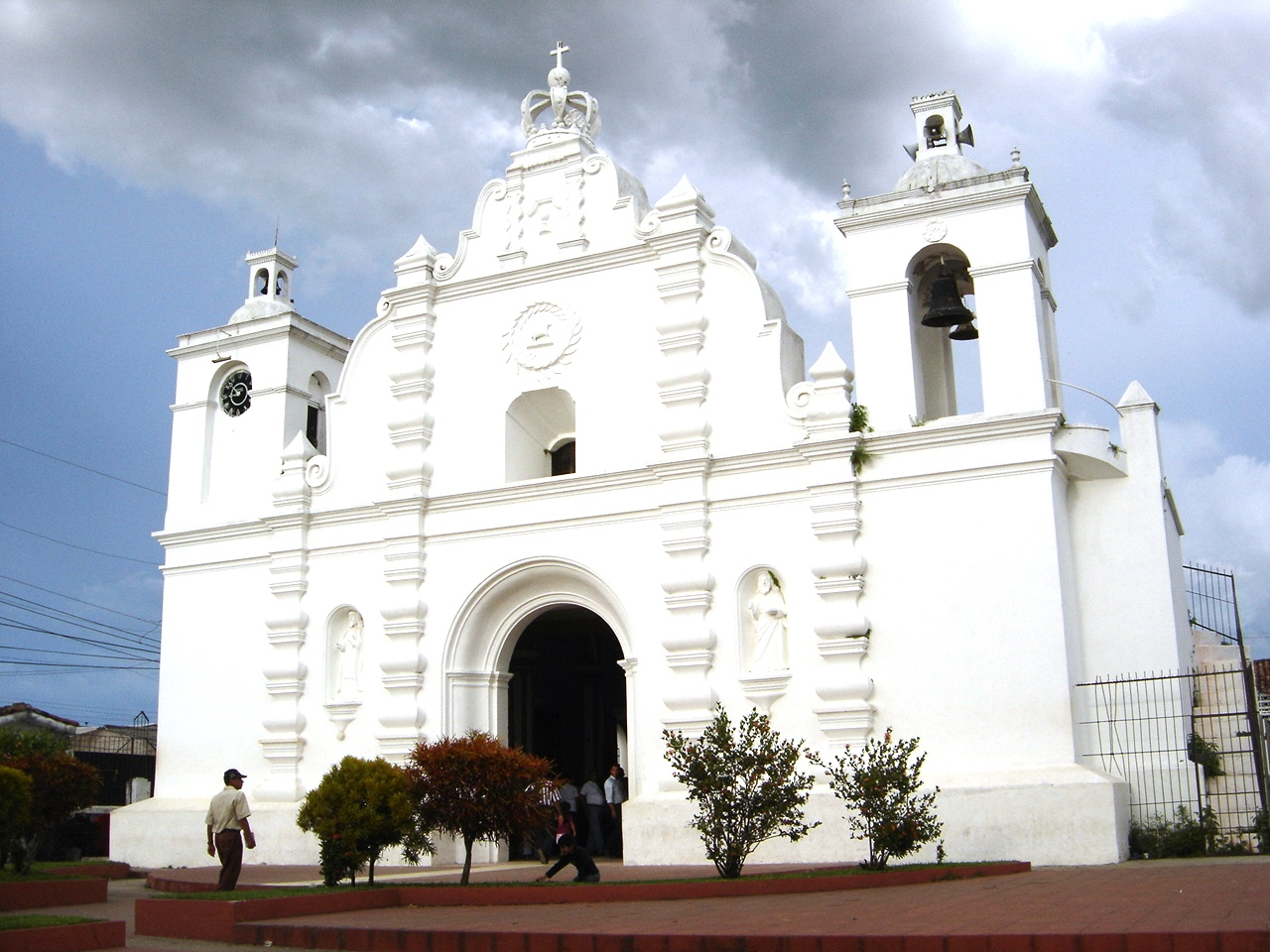
:Iglesia Parroquial San Juan Evangelista, San Juan Opico

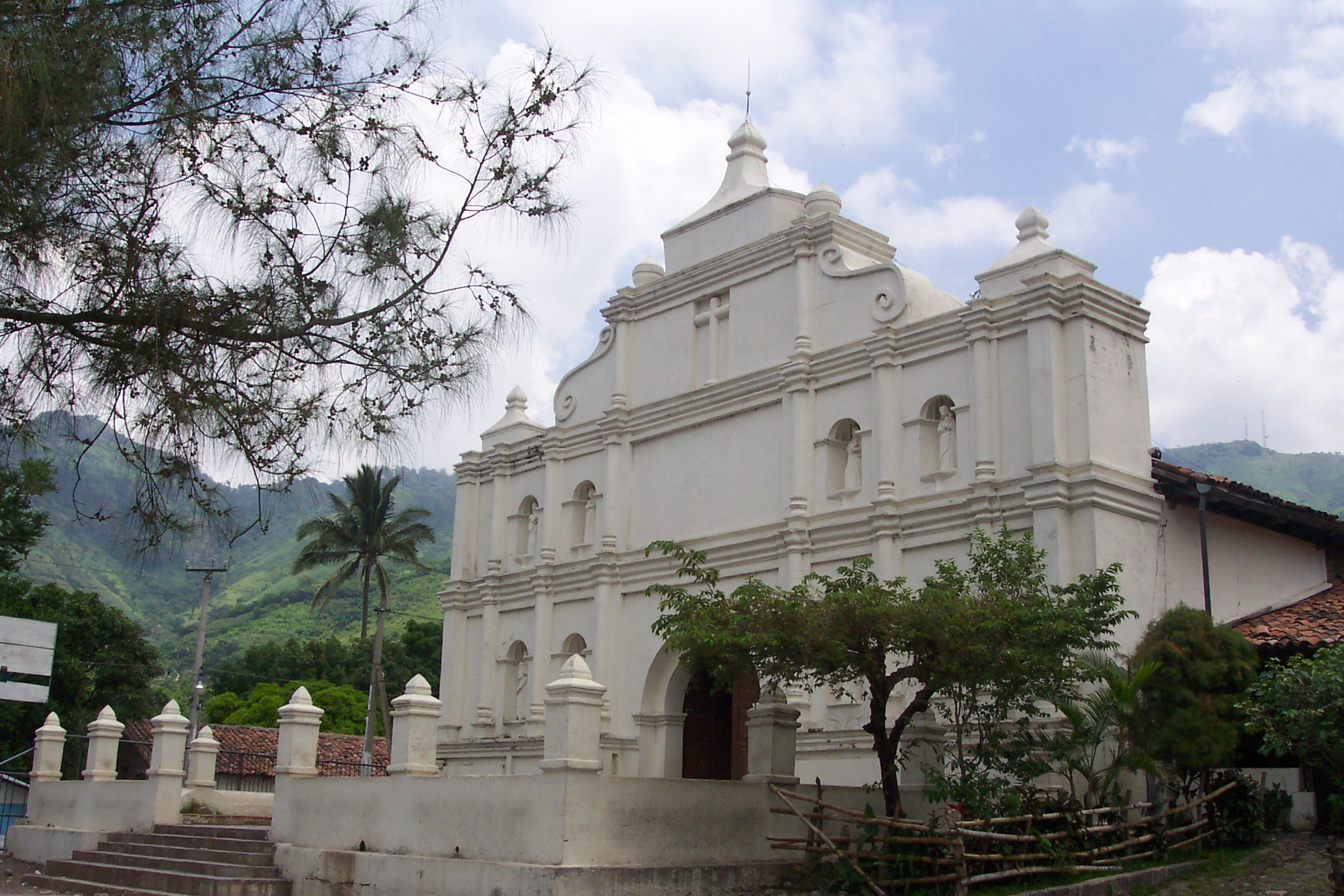
Iglesia de Panchimalco

== Statistics ==
Priests	1,013
Priests per capita	1 in 5,171
Females in religious life	1,669
Parishes	518

== Culture and festivals ==
A variety of saint days are celebrated as local holidays. The country itself is called "El Salvador" which translates as "The Savior" and takes the Transfigured Jesus, the Divine Savior of the World, as its patron saint, and His Feast Day on August 6 is a national holiday. The nation's co-patroness is Our Lady of Peace.

A noted Catholic school is the Jesuit Externado San José whose alumni include ex-president Armando Calderón Sol and Roque Dalton, a Communist poet. A prominent seminary is San José de la Montaña in San Salvador where both Romero and liberation theologian Rutilio Grande studied.

== See also ==
- Religion in El Salvador
- List of Central American and Caribbean Saints
