= San Vicente Cathedral, El Salvador =

St. Vincent Cathedral
- Catedral de San Vicente
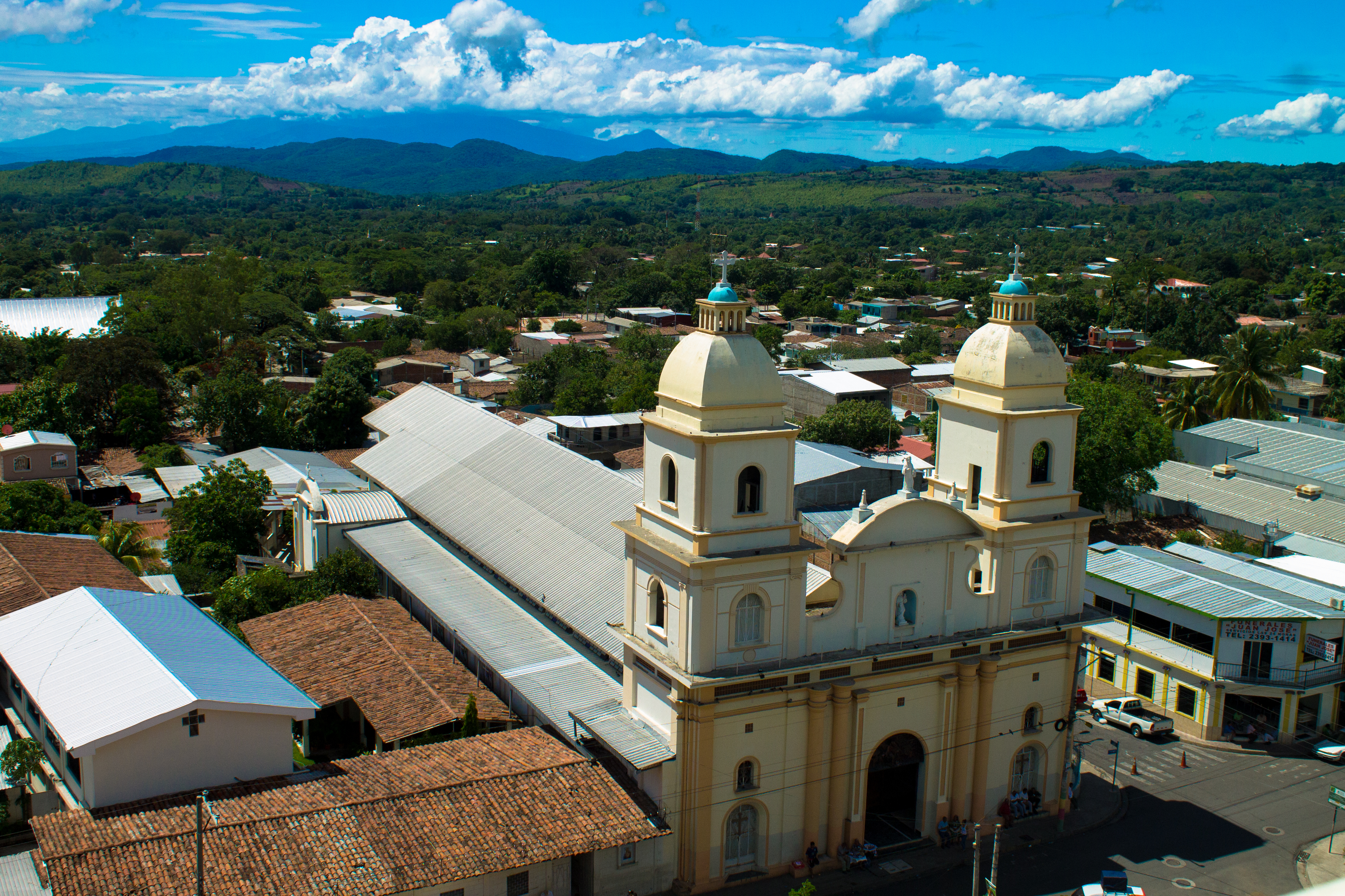
- St. Vincent Cathedral
- Location: San Vicente
- Country: El Salvador
- Denomination: Roman Catholic Church

The St. Vincent Cathedral (Spanish: Catedral de San Vicente) Also San Vicente Cathedral Is the name that receives a religious building affiliated with the Catholic Church that is located in front of the Central Park in Daniel Diaz street near the Antonio José Cañas Park of the city of San Vicente in the department of the same name, part of the Central American country of El Salvador.

The temple with eclectic elements and neoclassical influence follows the Latin or Roman rite and functions as the most important church in the Diocese of San Vicente (Dioecesis Sancti Vincentii) that was created in 1943 through the bull "Si qua in catholico" of Pope Pius XII.

It is under the pastoral responsibility of Bishop José Elías Rauda Gutiérrez.

== See also ==
· · ·
- Roman Catholicism in El Salvador
- Saint Vincent

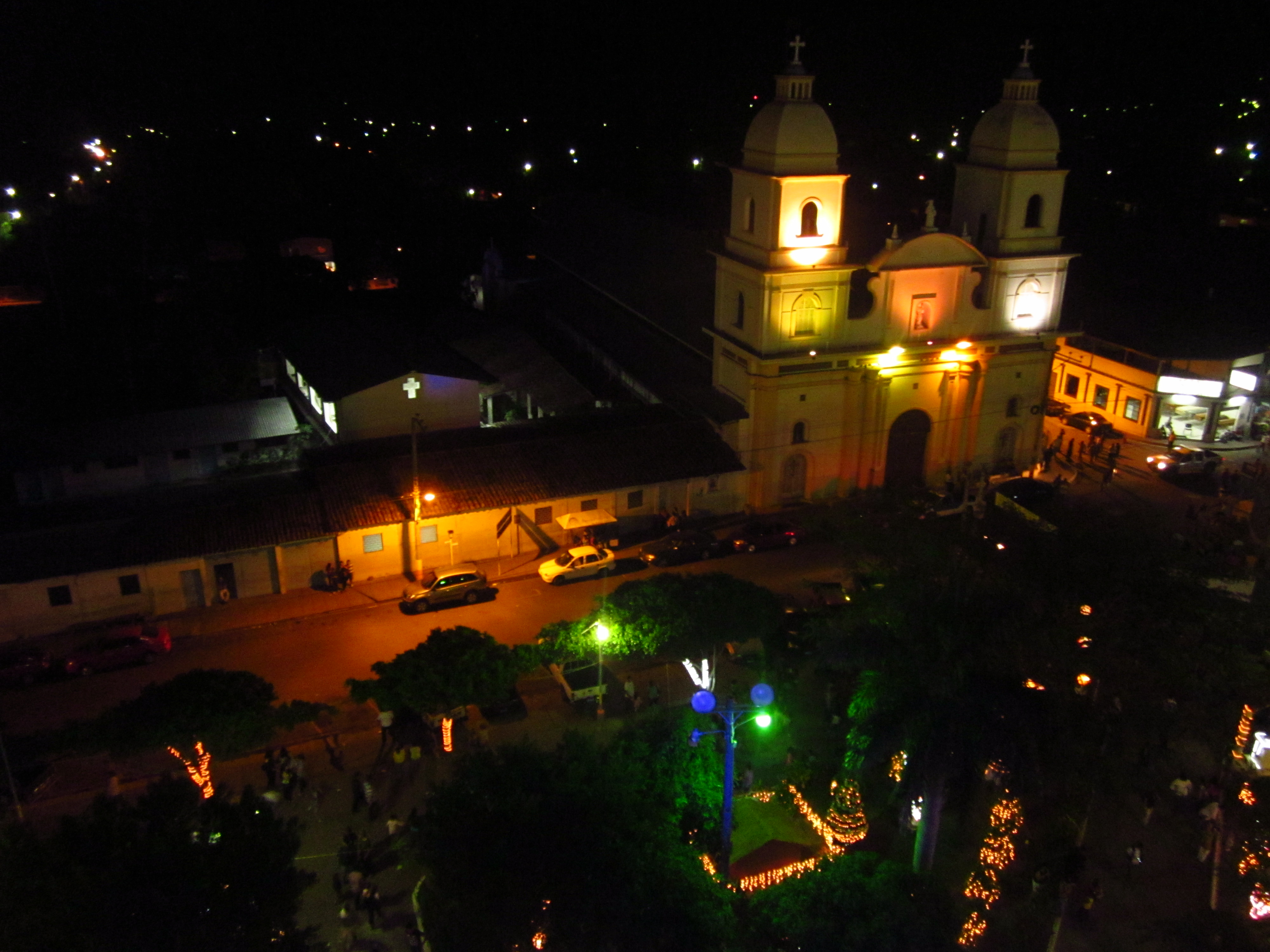
Another View
