= Our Lady of the Poor Cathedral, Zacatecoluca =

Our Lady of the Poor Cathedral
- Catedral de Nuestra Señora de los Pobres
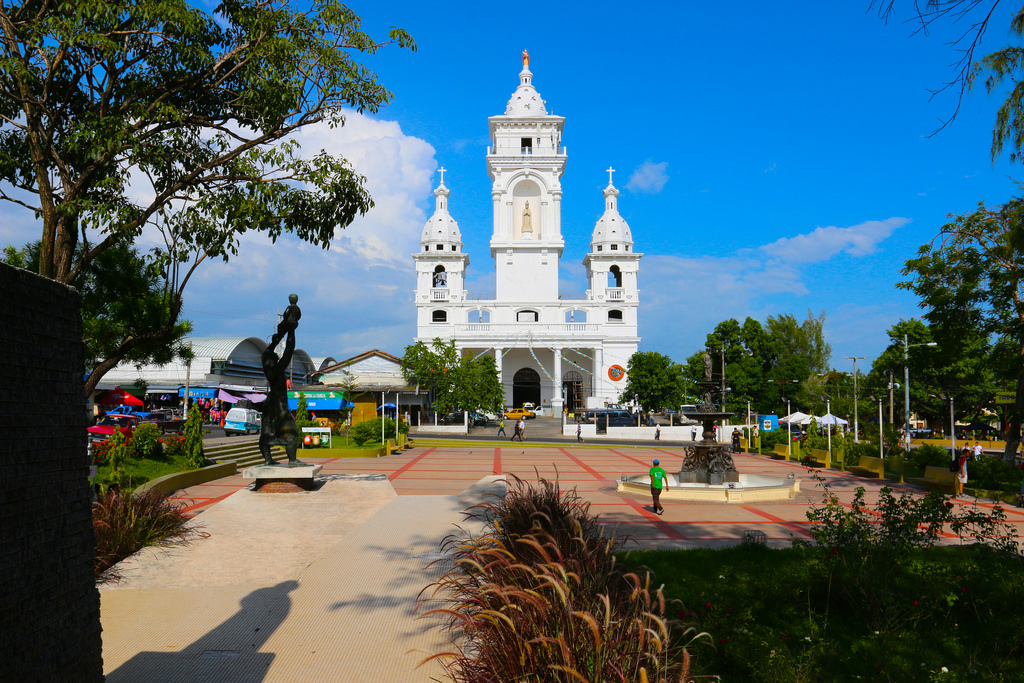
- Our Lady of the Poor Cathedral
- 13.5089°N 88.8693°W
- Location: Zacatecoluca
- Country: El Salvador
- Denomination: Roman Catholic Church

The Our Lady of the Poor Cathedral (Spanish: Catedral de Nuestra Señora de los Pobres) also known as the Zacatecoluca Cathedral, is the main church of the Catholic Diocese of Zacatecoluca, in the city of Zacatecoluca, in the Central American country of El Salvador.

In the sixteenth century, when the Spanish founded the city, it was located to the east of the central square (present Cañas Square), site in which it has been located since. The Cathedral of Zacatecoluca has undergone different modifications over time.

Originally it was a hermitage of adobe and tile, maintaining itself until being replaced in 1740 by another one of facade of wood with influences of some elements of the Renaissance and Baroque styles.

This old cathedral was standing until 1965 and was called Santa Lucia Church.

In 1965, the current building of the Cathedral of Zacatecoluca began to be constructed and was finalized in 1975 due to arrears that resulted via lack of funds for its construction.

== See also ==
- Roman Catholicism in El Salvador
- Our Lady of the Poor

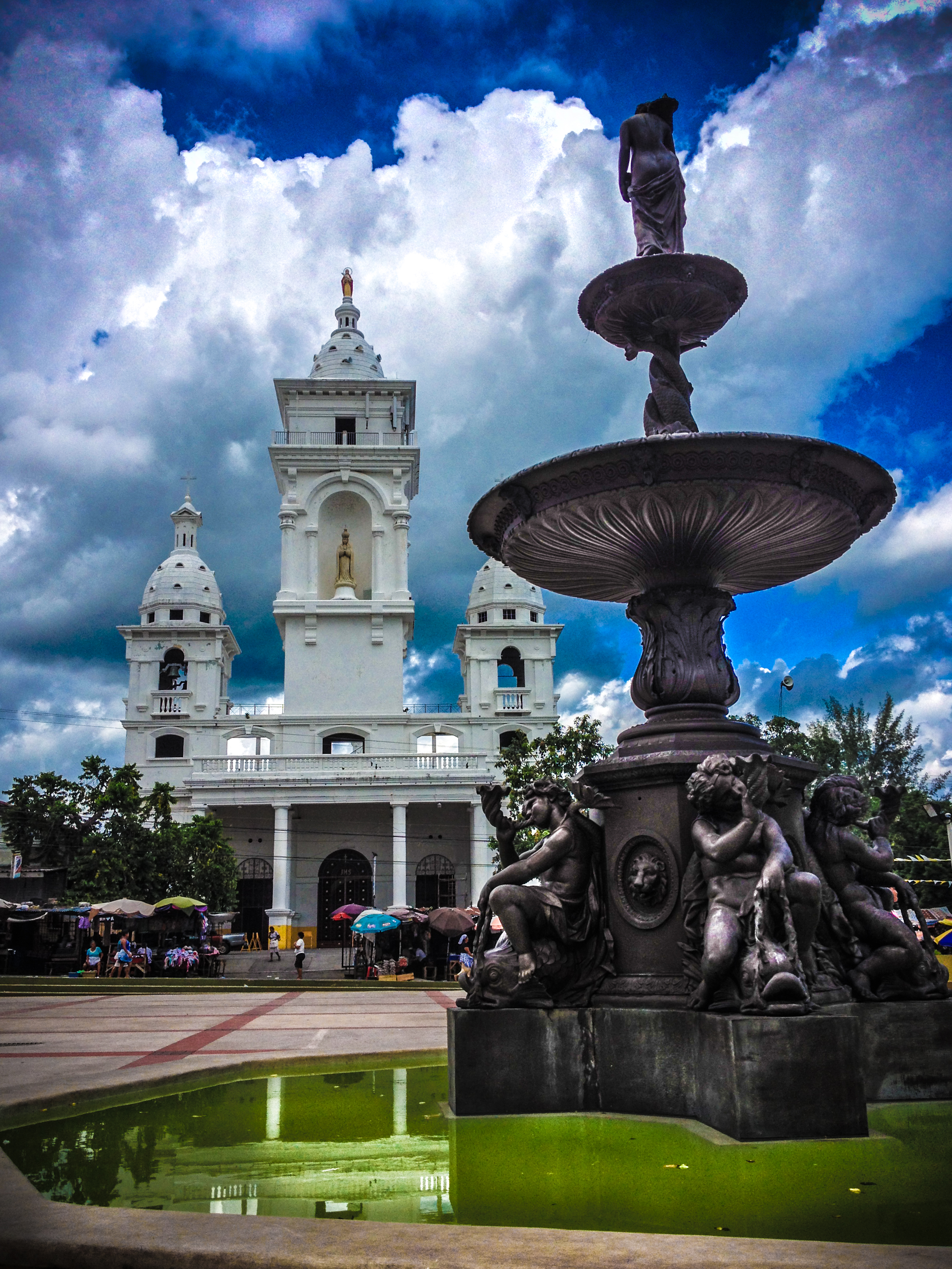
Another View
