= Sonsonate Cathedral =

Most Holy Trinity Cathedral
- Catedral de la Santísima Trinidad
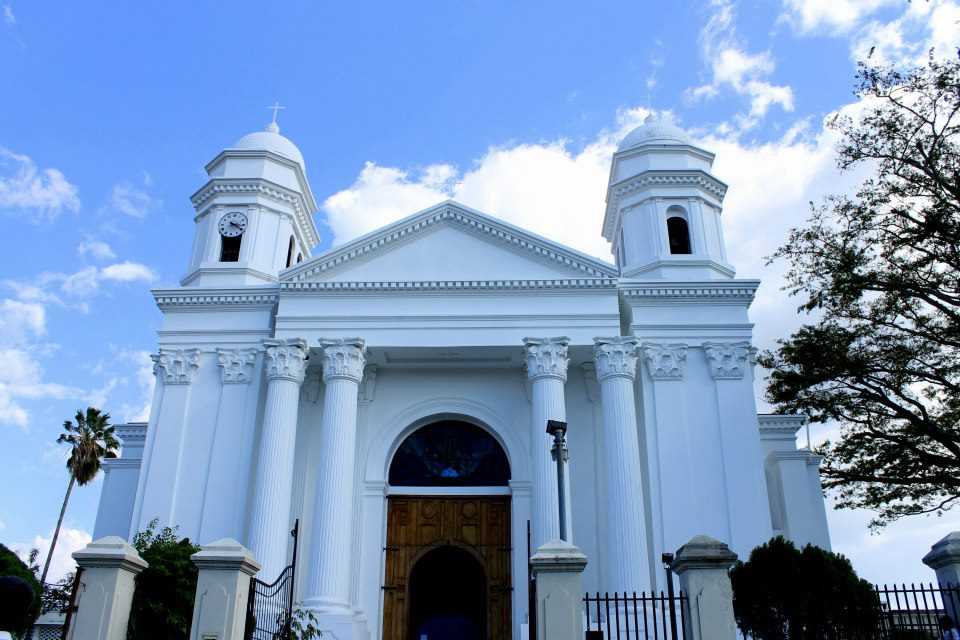
- Most Holy Trinity Cathedral
- 13°43′13″N 89°43′38″W
- Location: Sonsonate
- Country: El Salvador
- Denomination: Roman Catholic Church

The Most Holy Trinity Cathedral (Spanish: Catedral de la Santísima Trinidad) Also Sonsonate Cathedral is the name given to a religious building affiliated with the Catholic Church located in the city of Sonsonate in the department of the same name, in the western part of the Central American country of El Salvador. As its name indicates this is dedicated to the mystery Christian of the Holy Trinity.

The present building started as a parish, was blessed in 1887 and elevated to cathedral status in 1986. It is a temple that follows the Roman or Latin rite and is the main church of the diocese of Sonsonate (Dioecesis Sonsonatensis) which was created by The bull "De grege Christi" of the then Pope John Paul II.

It is under the pastoral responsibility of Bishop Constantino Barrera Morales.

== See also ==
- Roman Catholicism in El Salvador
- Roman Catholic Diocese of Sonsonate

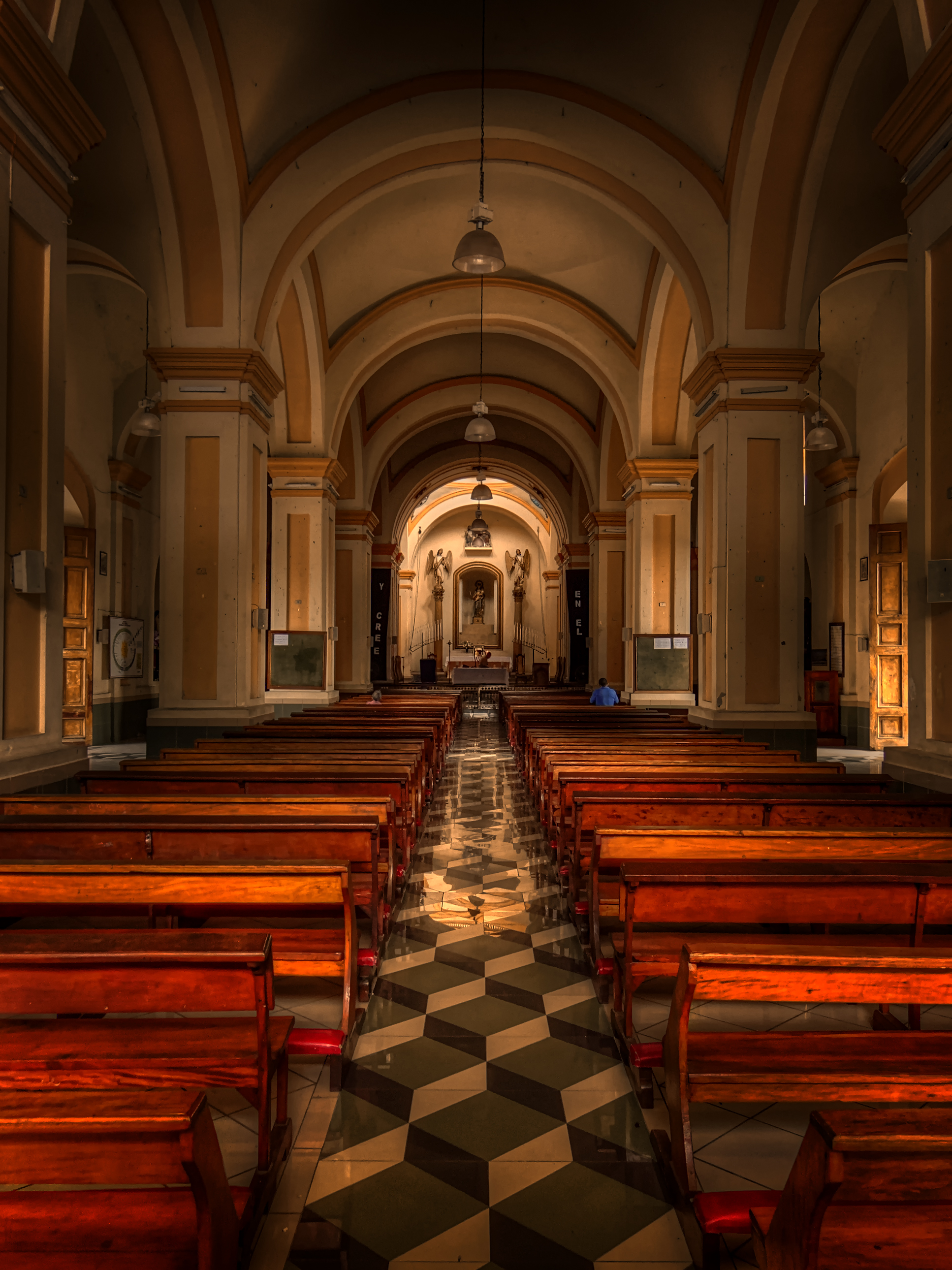
Internal View
