= List of cathedrals in the Czech Republic =

This is the list of cathedrals in the Czech Republic sorted by denomination.

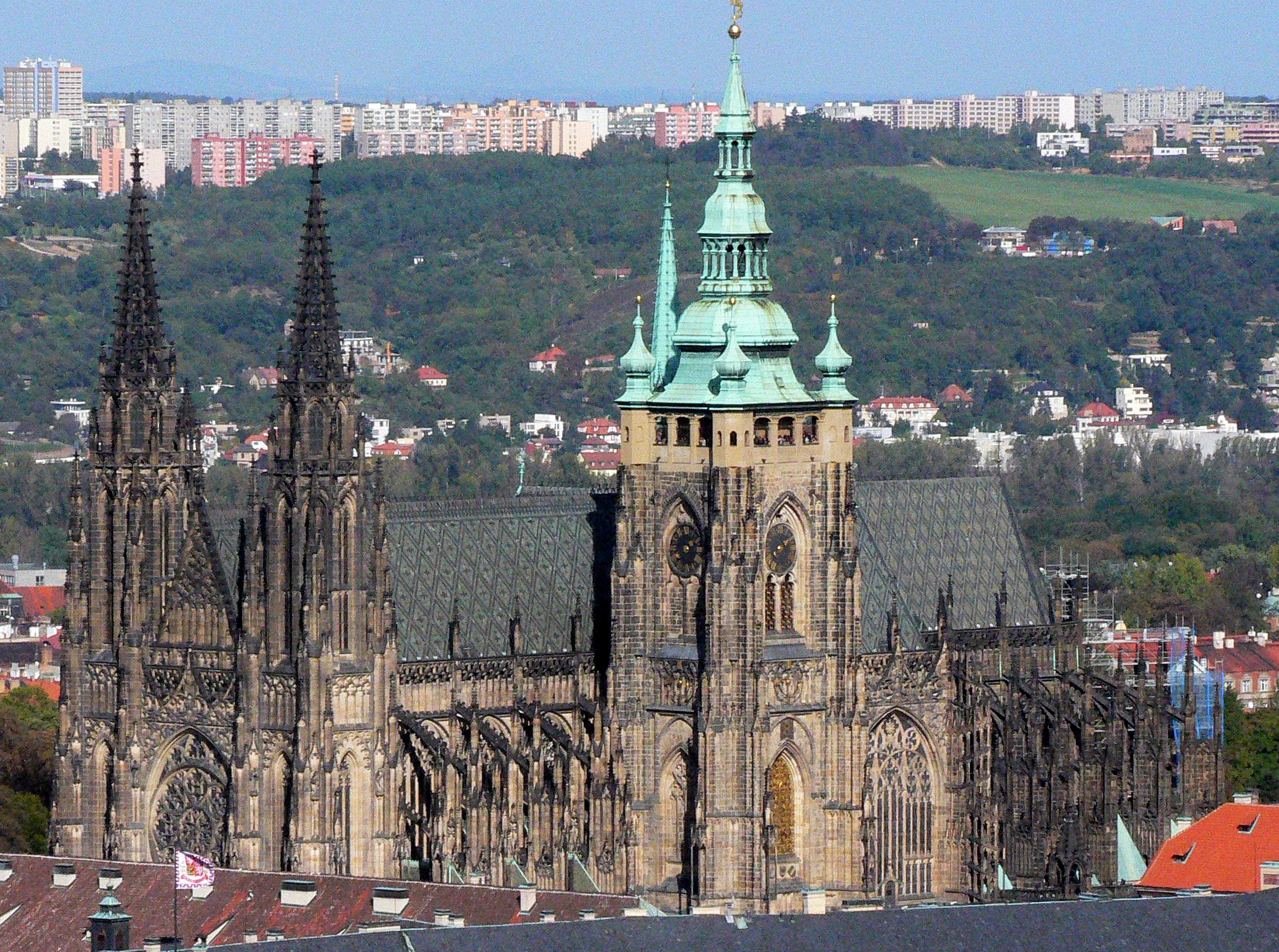
St. Vitus Cathedral in the Prague Castle, Prague

== Catholic ==
=== Latin Church ===
The following are Latin Church cathedrals and co-cathedrals of the Catholic Church in the Czech Republic:

Ecclesiastical province of Bohemia

- St. Vitus Cathedral in Prague (Archdiocese of Prague)
- St. Nicholas Cathedral in České Budějovice (Diocese of České Budějovice)
- Cathedral of the Holy Spirit in Hradec Králové (Diocese of Hradec Králové)
- St. Stephen's Cathedral in Litoměřice (Diocese of Litoměřice)
- Cathedral of St. Bartholomew in Plzeň (Diocese of Plzeň)

Ecclesiastical province of Moravia

- Cathedral of Saint Wenceslaus in Olomouc (Archdiocese of Olomouc)
- Cathedral of Sts. Peter and Paul in Brno (Diocese of Brno)
- Cathedral of the Divine Saviour in Ostrava (Diocese of Ostrava-Opava)
  - Co-Cathedral of the Assumption of the Virgin Mary in Opava
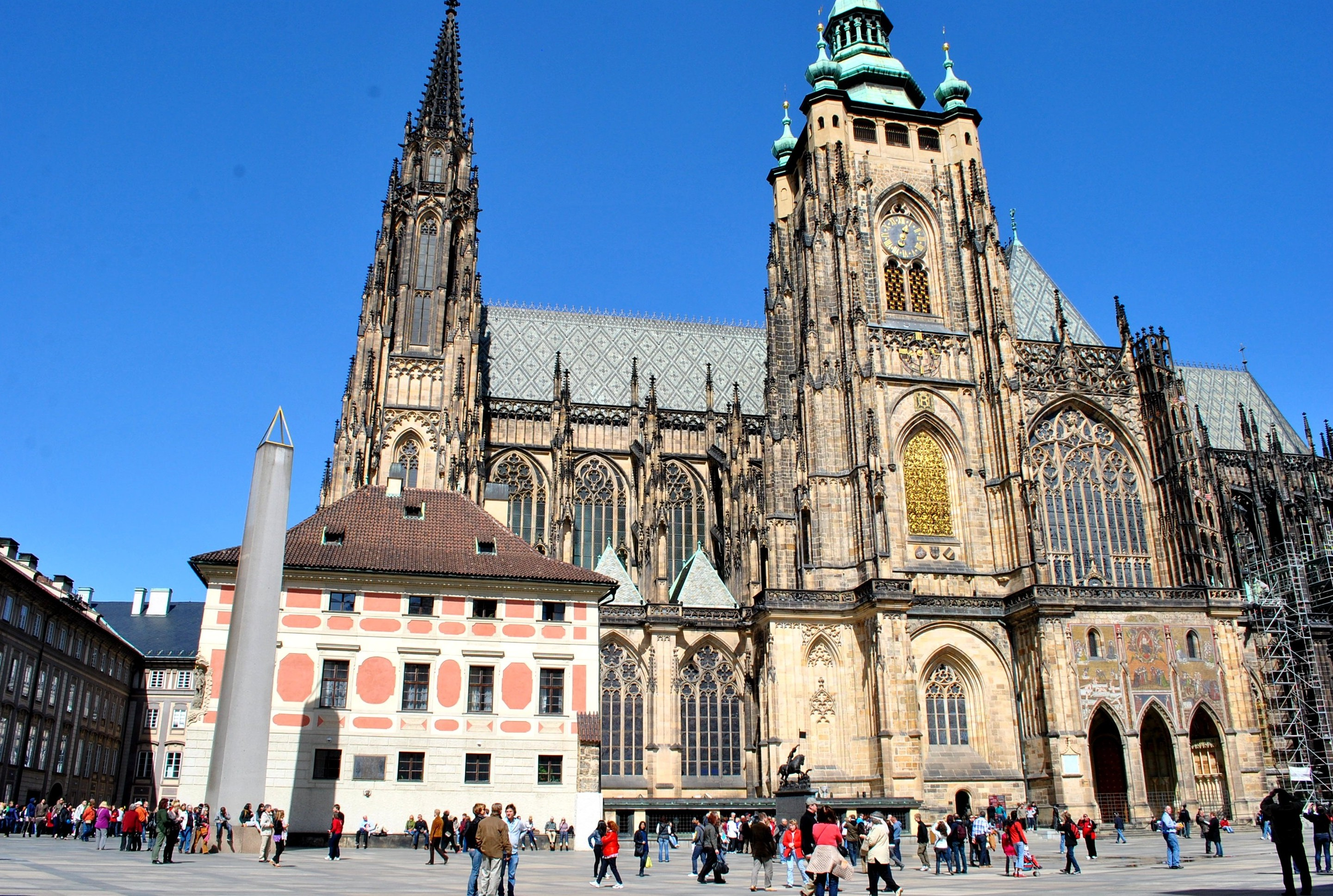
Cathedral of St. Vitus in Prague

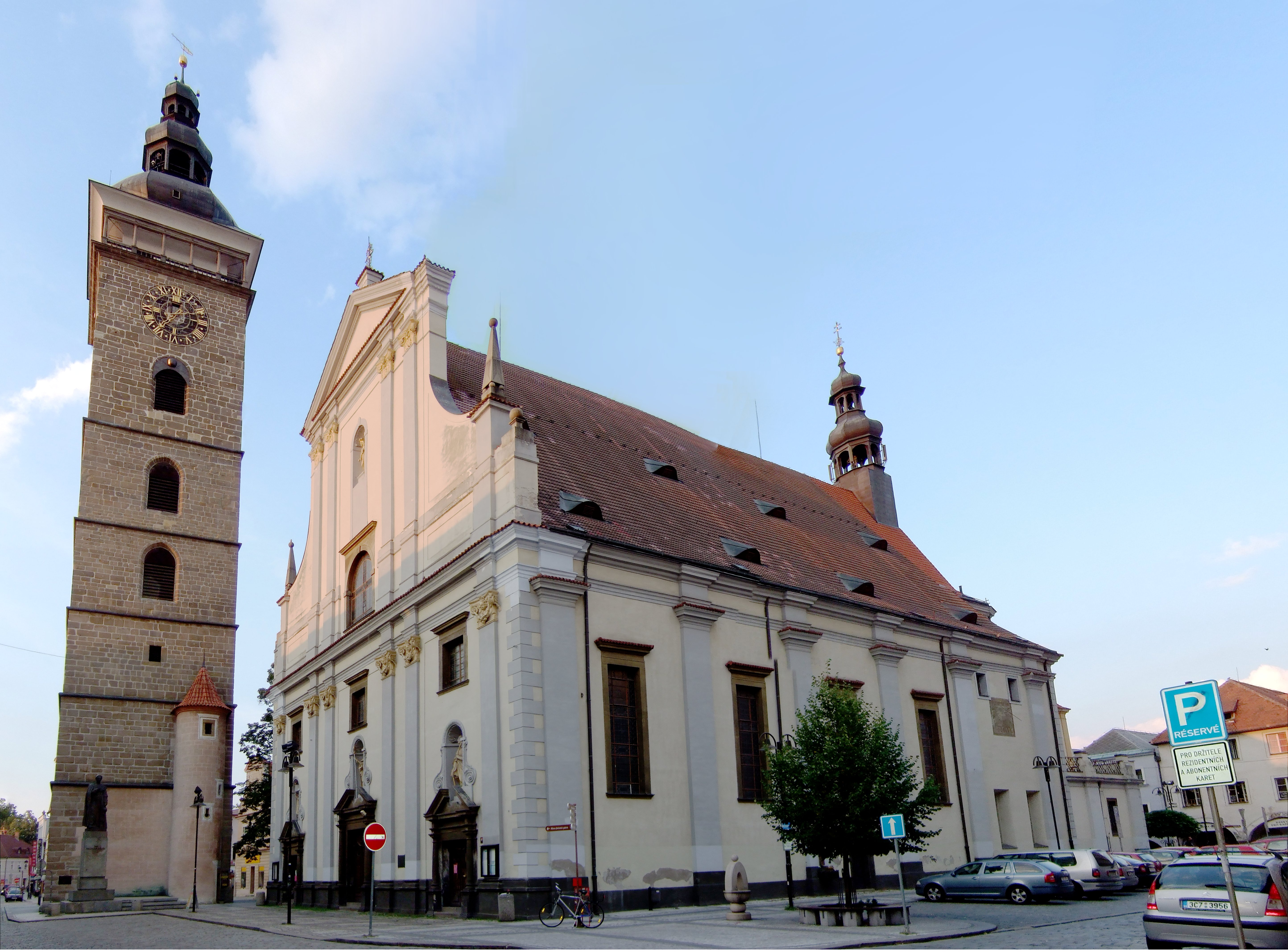
Cathedral of St. Nicholas in České Budějovice

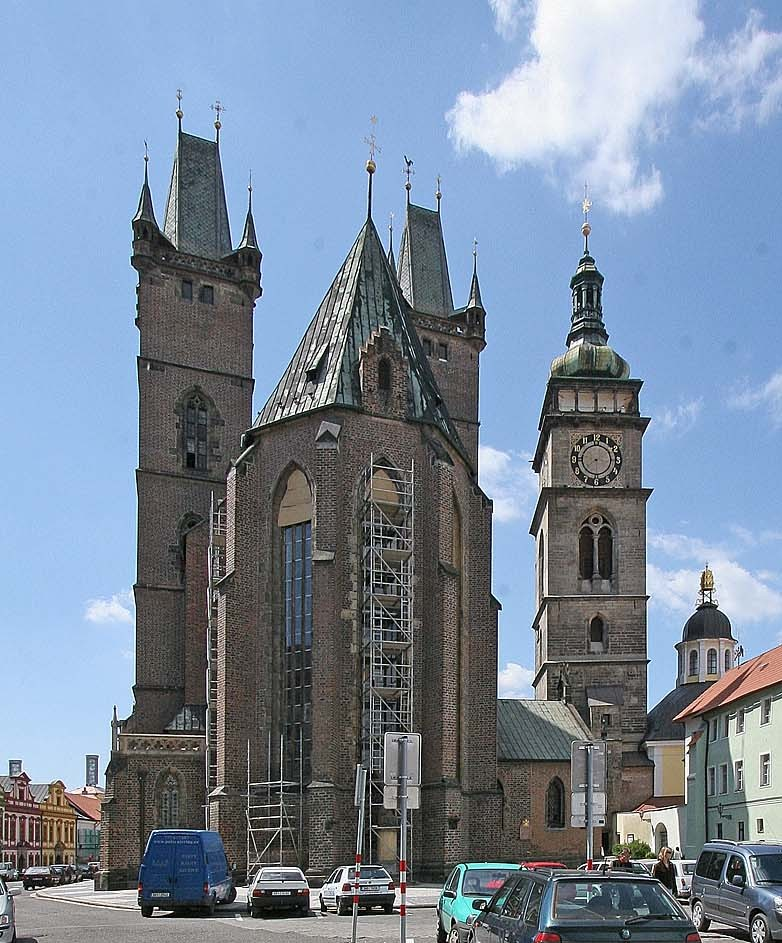
Cathedral of the Holy Spirit in Hradec Králové

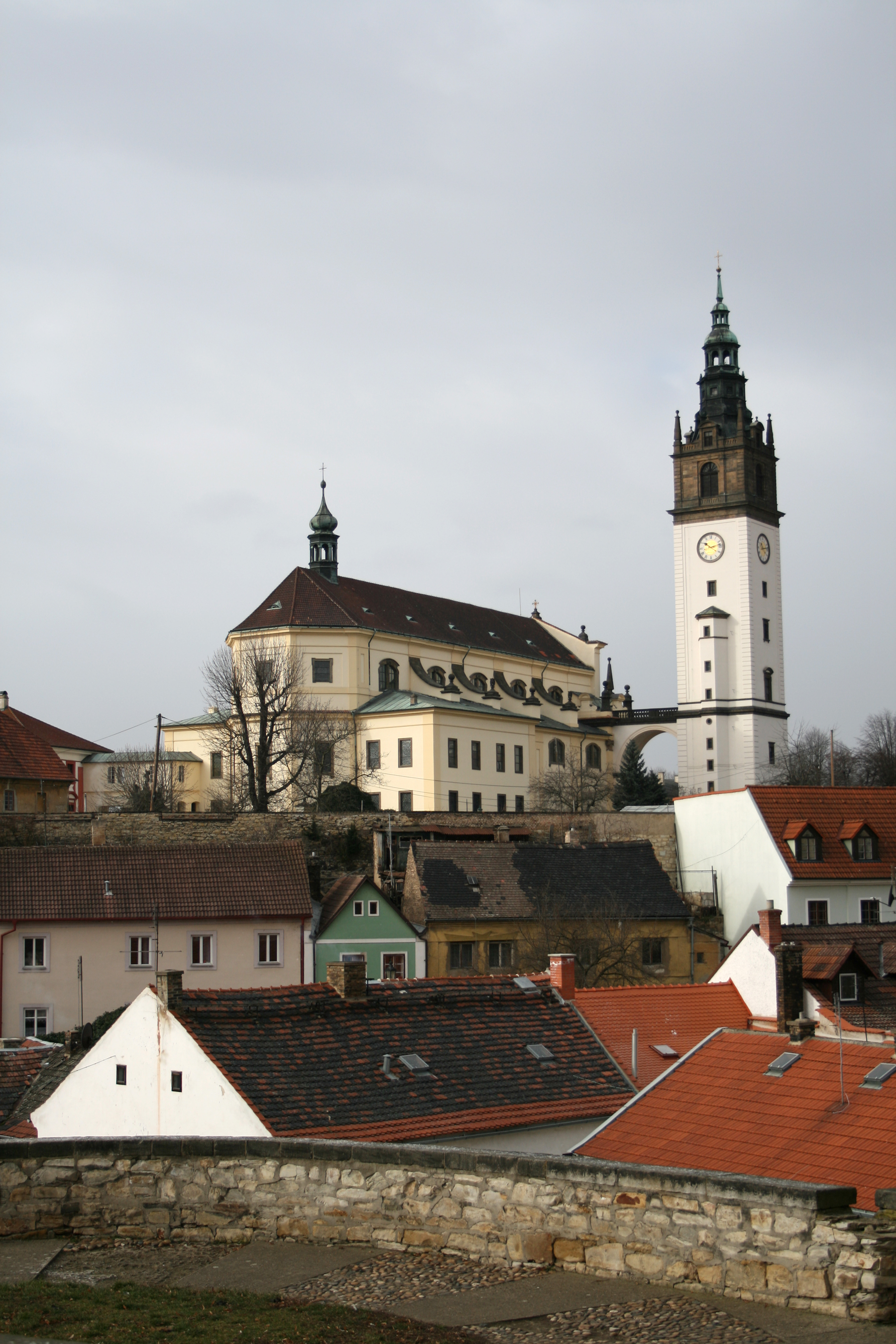
Cathedral of St. Stephen in Litoměřice

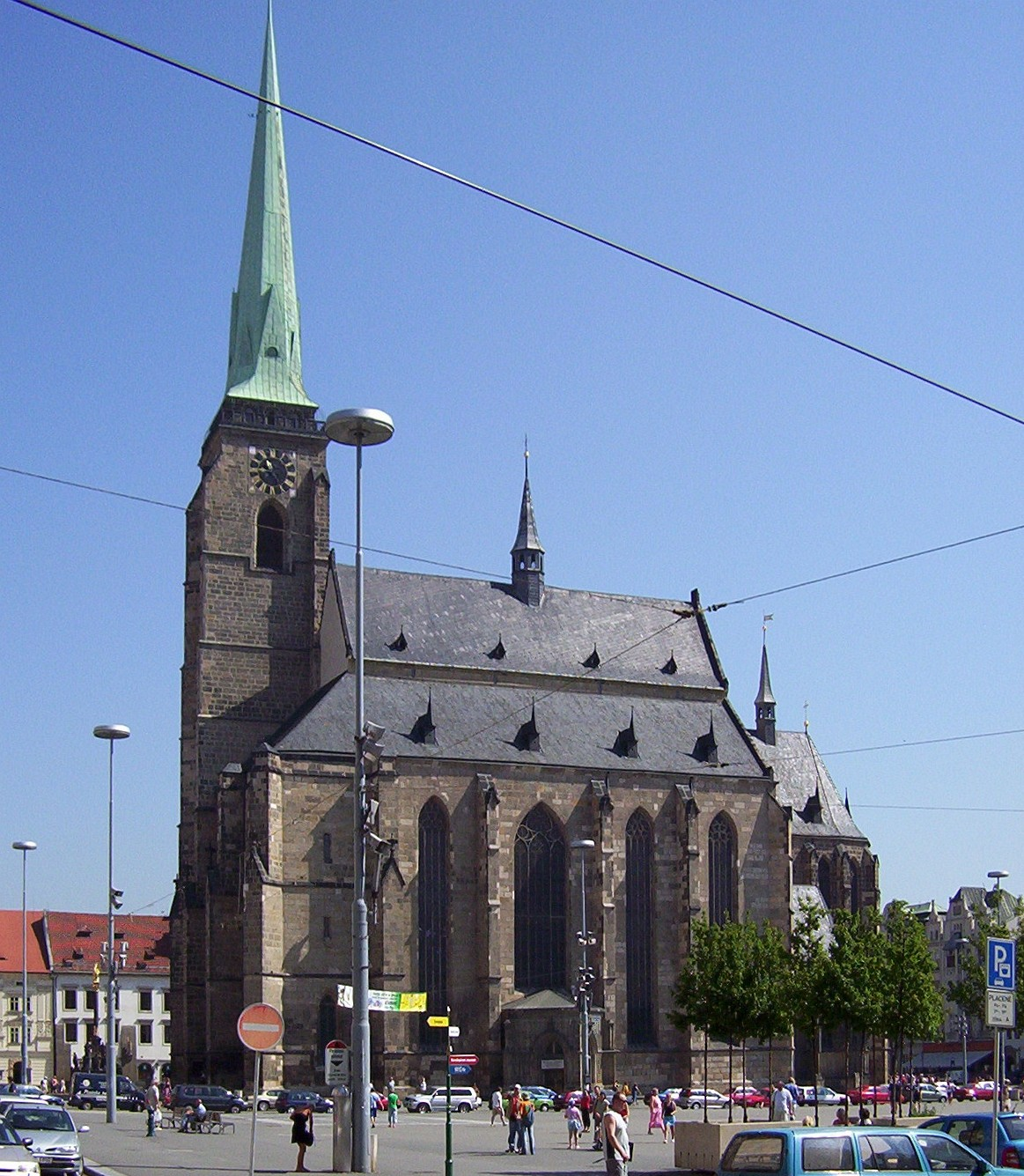
Cathedral of St. Bartholomew in Plzeň

Cathedral of Saints Peter and Paul in Brno

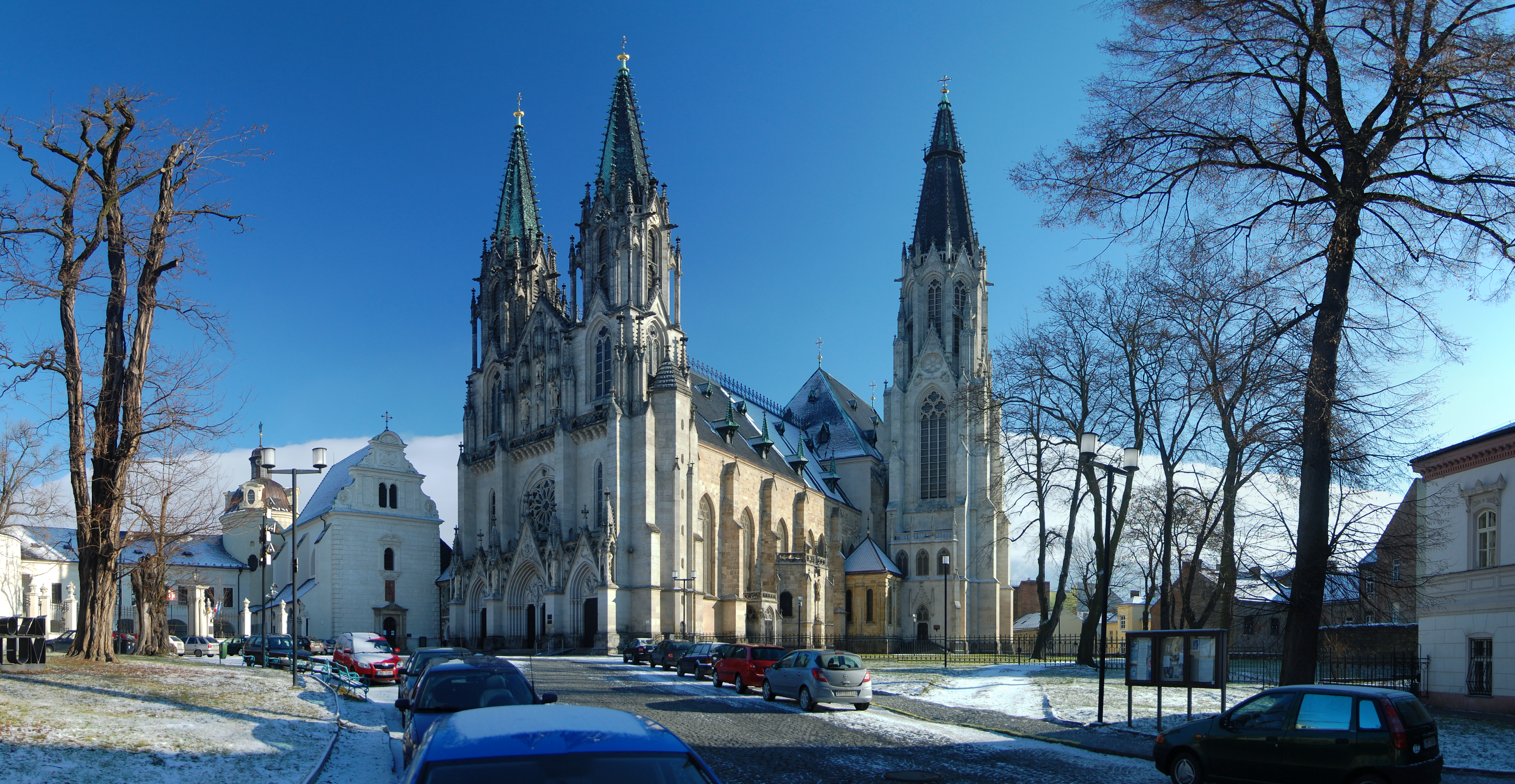
Cathedral of Saint Wenceslaus in Olomouc

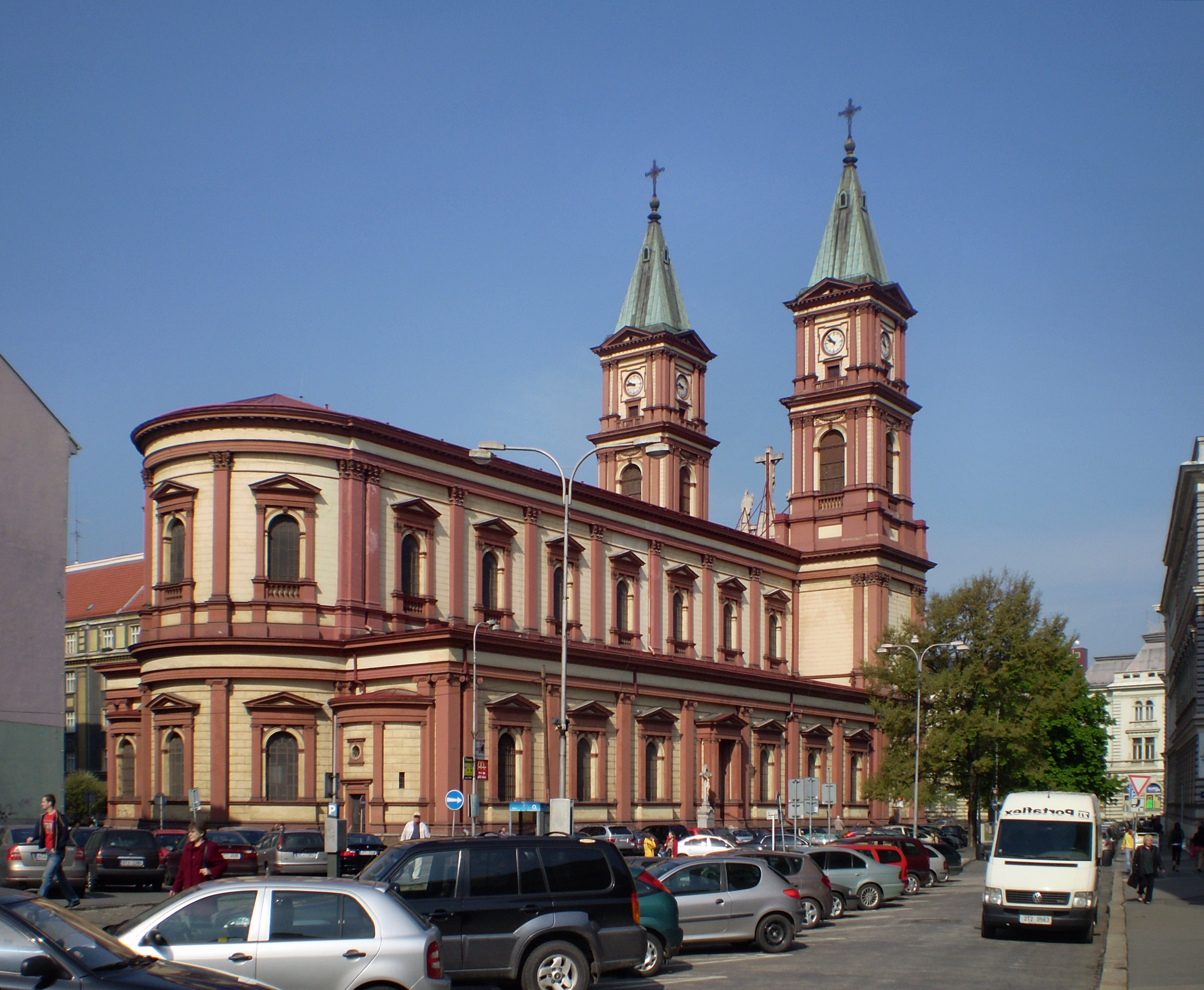
Cathedral of the Divine Saviour in Ostrava

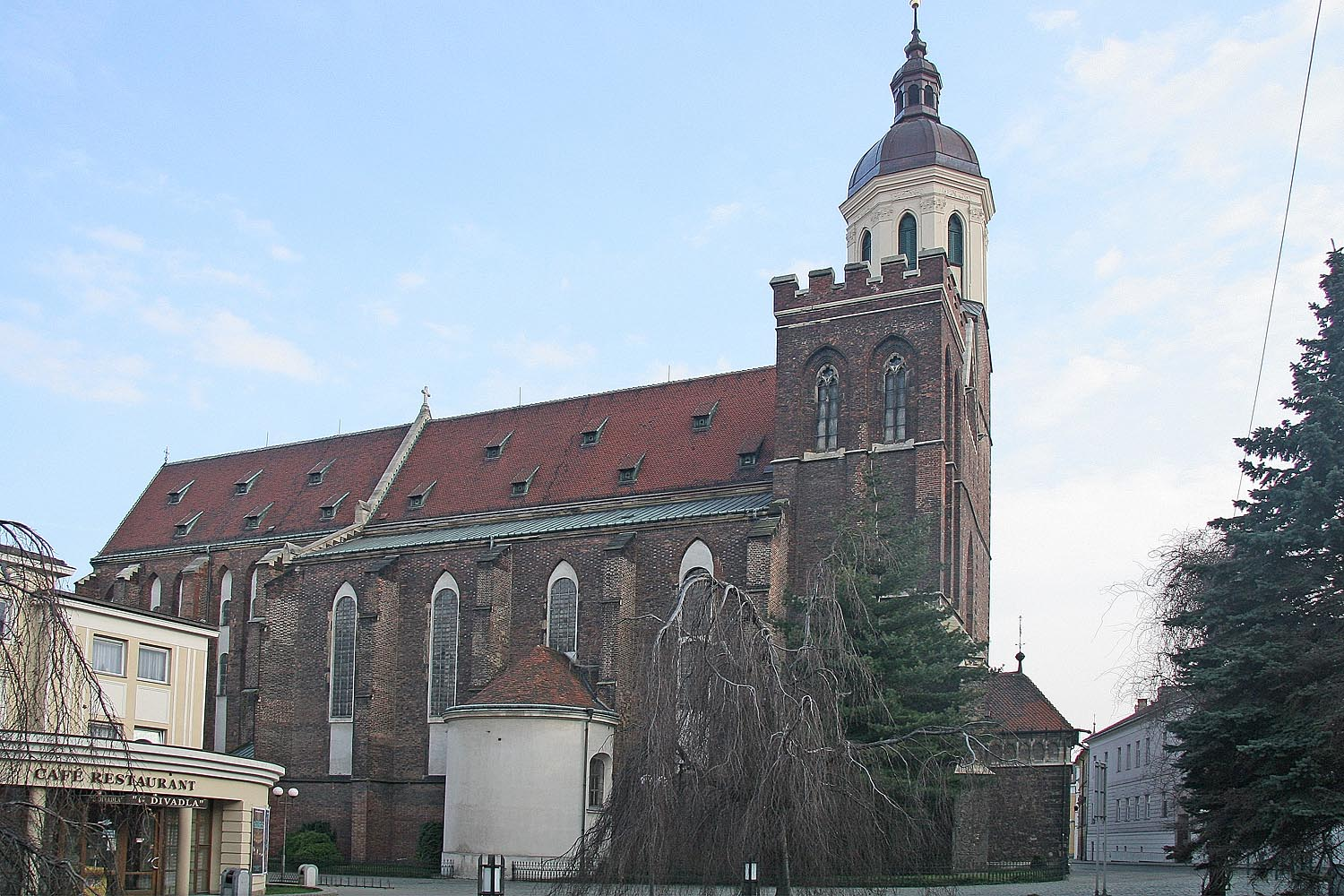
Co-Cathedral of the Assumption of the Virgin Mary in Opava

=== Ruthenian Greek Catholic Church ===
The following cathedral of the Ruthenian Greek Catholic Church is located in the Czech Republic:

- St. Clement's Cathedral, Prague (Apostolic Exarchate in the Czech Republic)
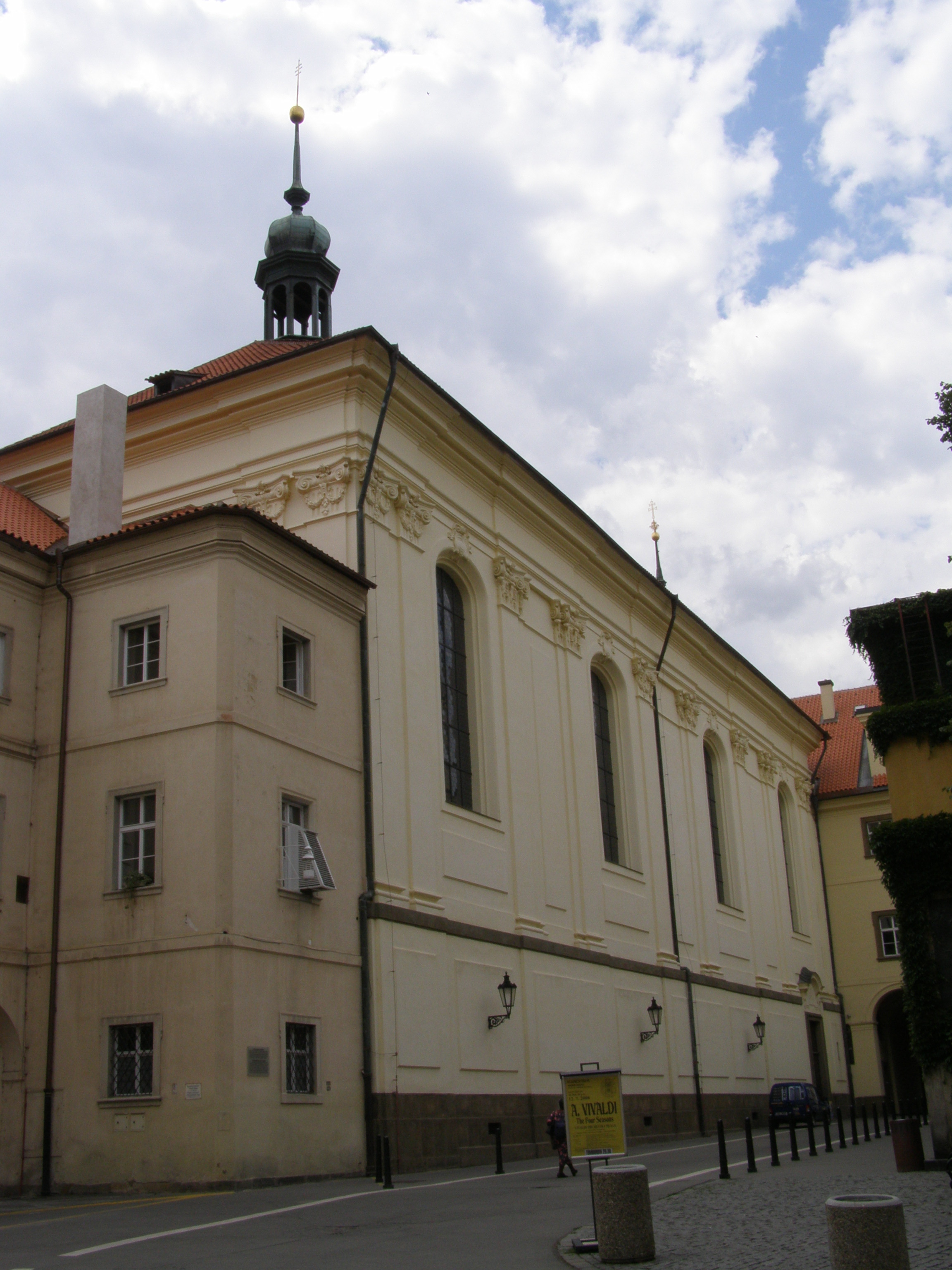
Cathedral of St. Clement in Clementinum, Prague

== Old Catholic ==
The following Old Catholic cathedrals are located in the Czech Republic:

- Cathedral of St. Lawrence in Prague
  - Co-Cathedral of the Transfiguration in Varnsdorf
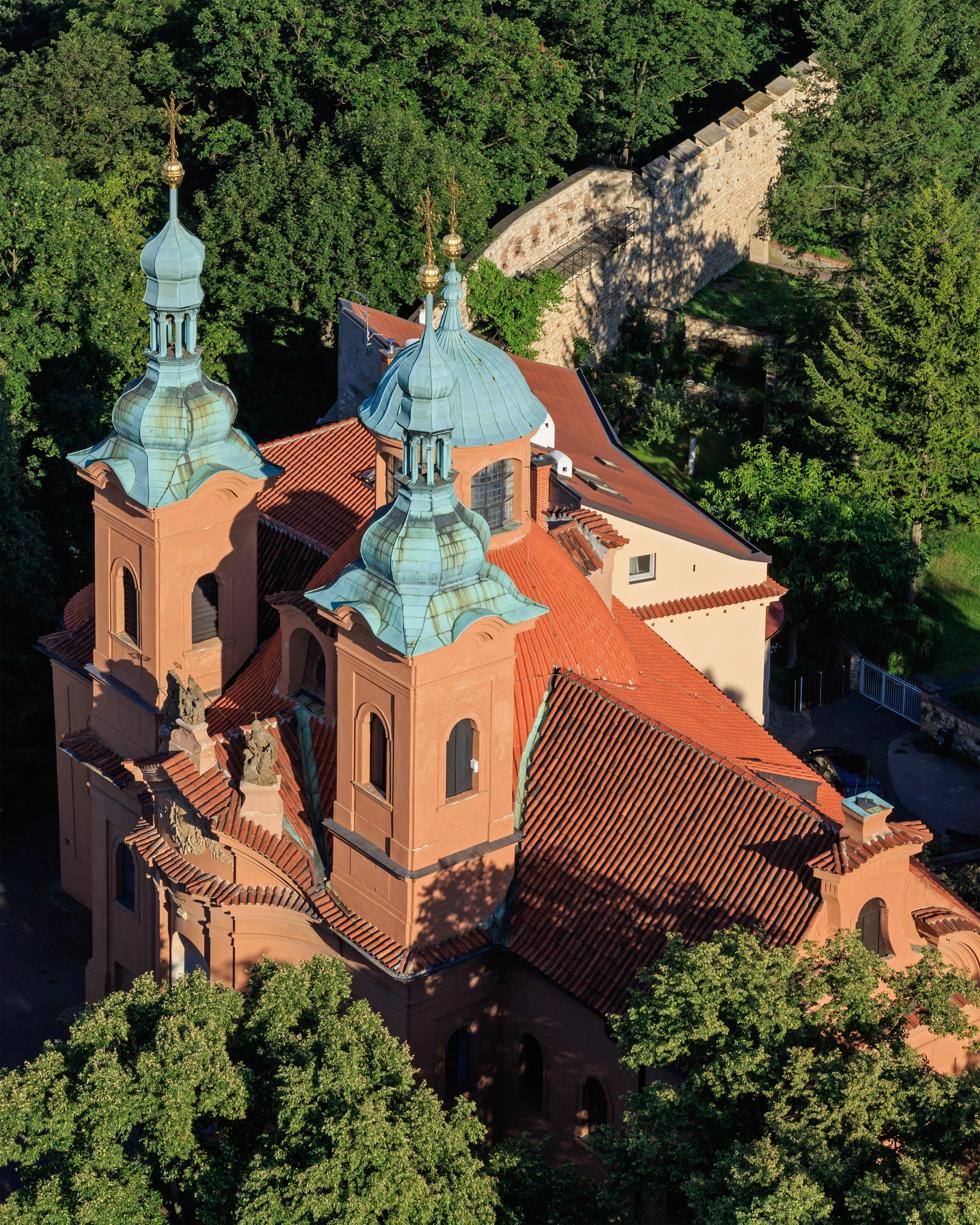
Cathedral of St. Lawrence in Prague

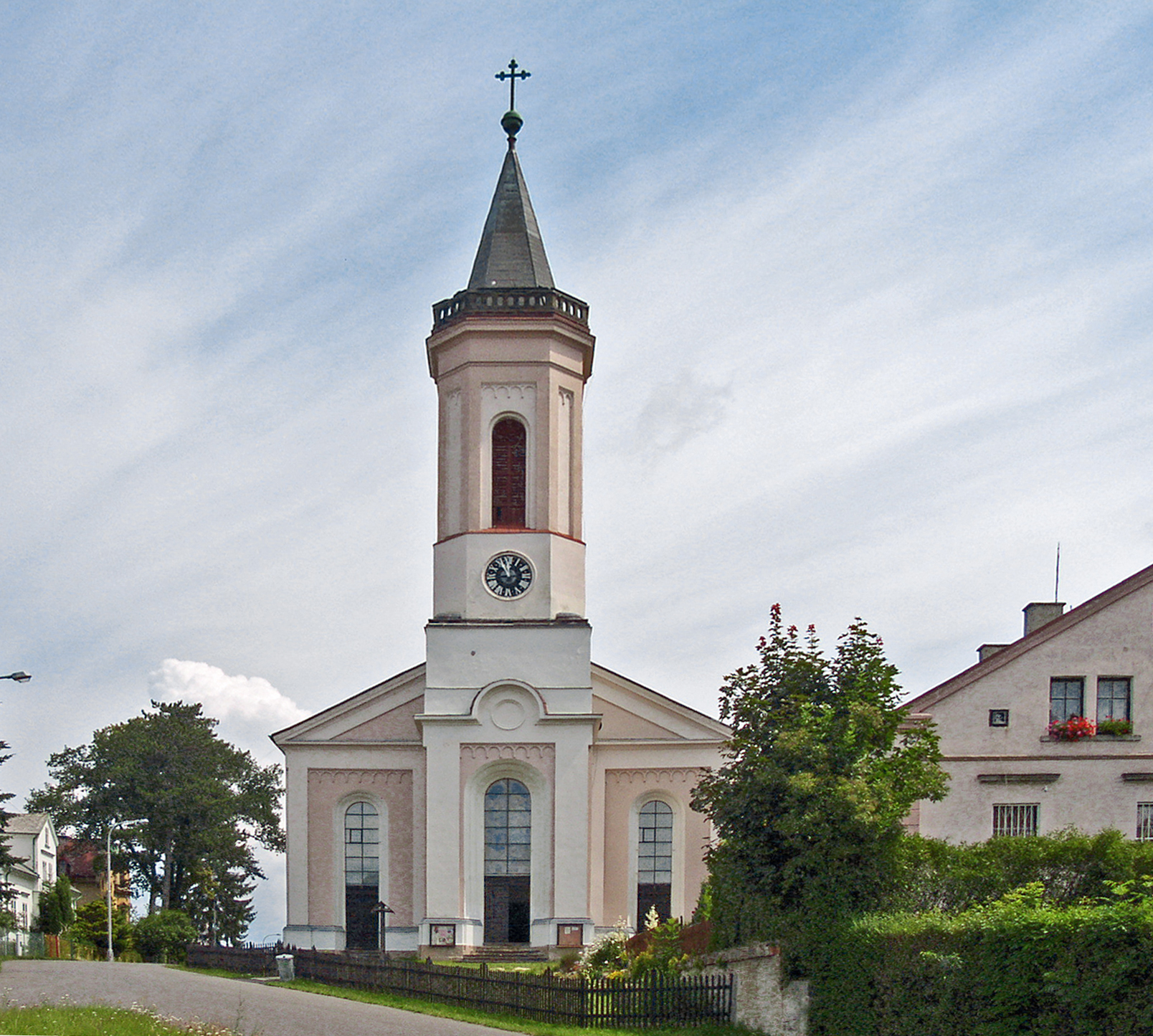
Co-Cathedral of the Transfiguration in Varnsdorf

== Eastern Orthodox ==
The following cathedrals of the Czech and Slovak Orthodox Church cathedrals are located in the Czech Republic:

- Ss. Cyril and Methodius Cathedral in Prague
- Cathedral of St. Gorazd in Olomouc
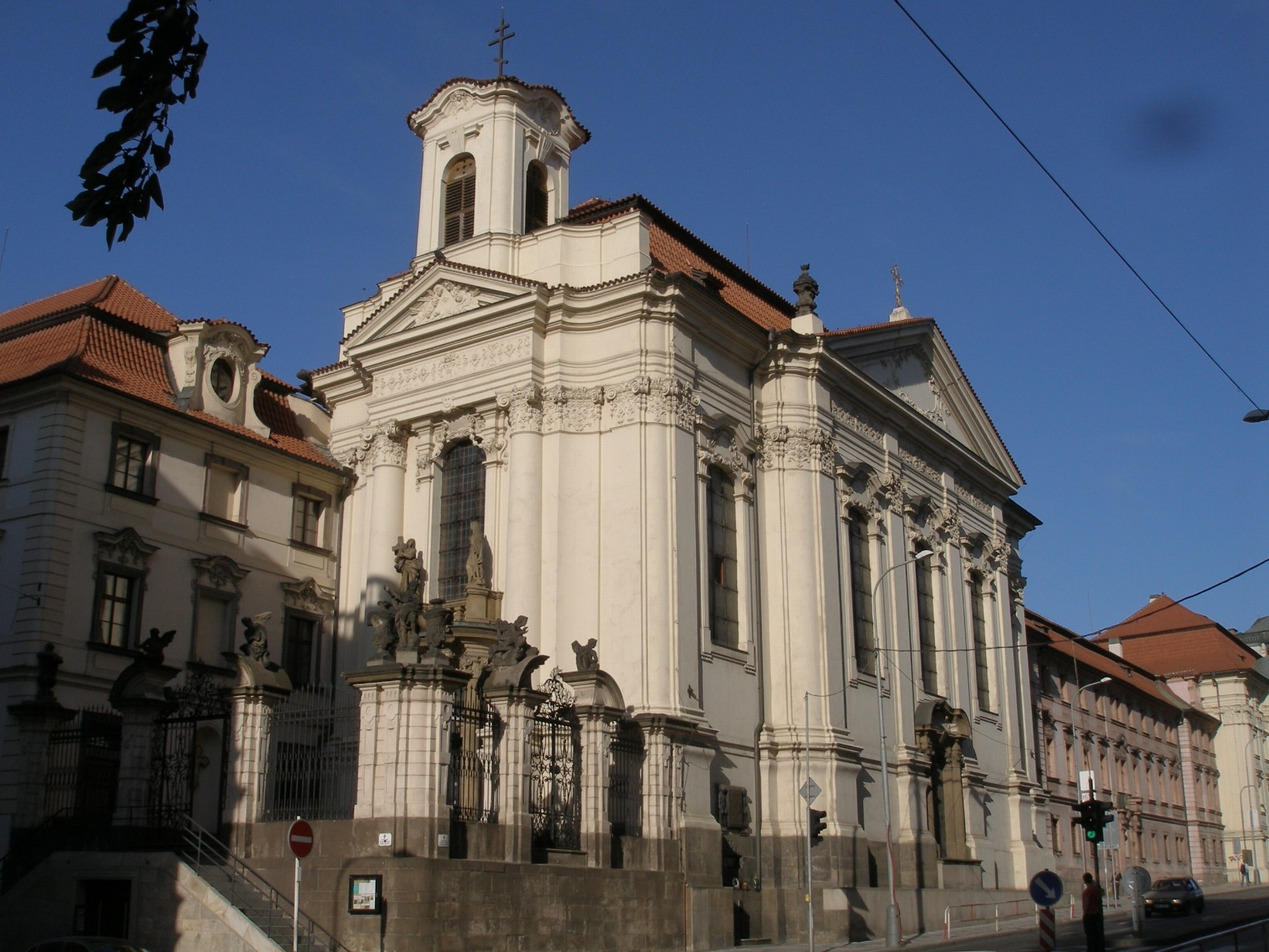
Ss. Cyril and Methodius Cathedral in Prague

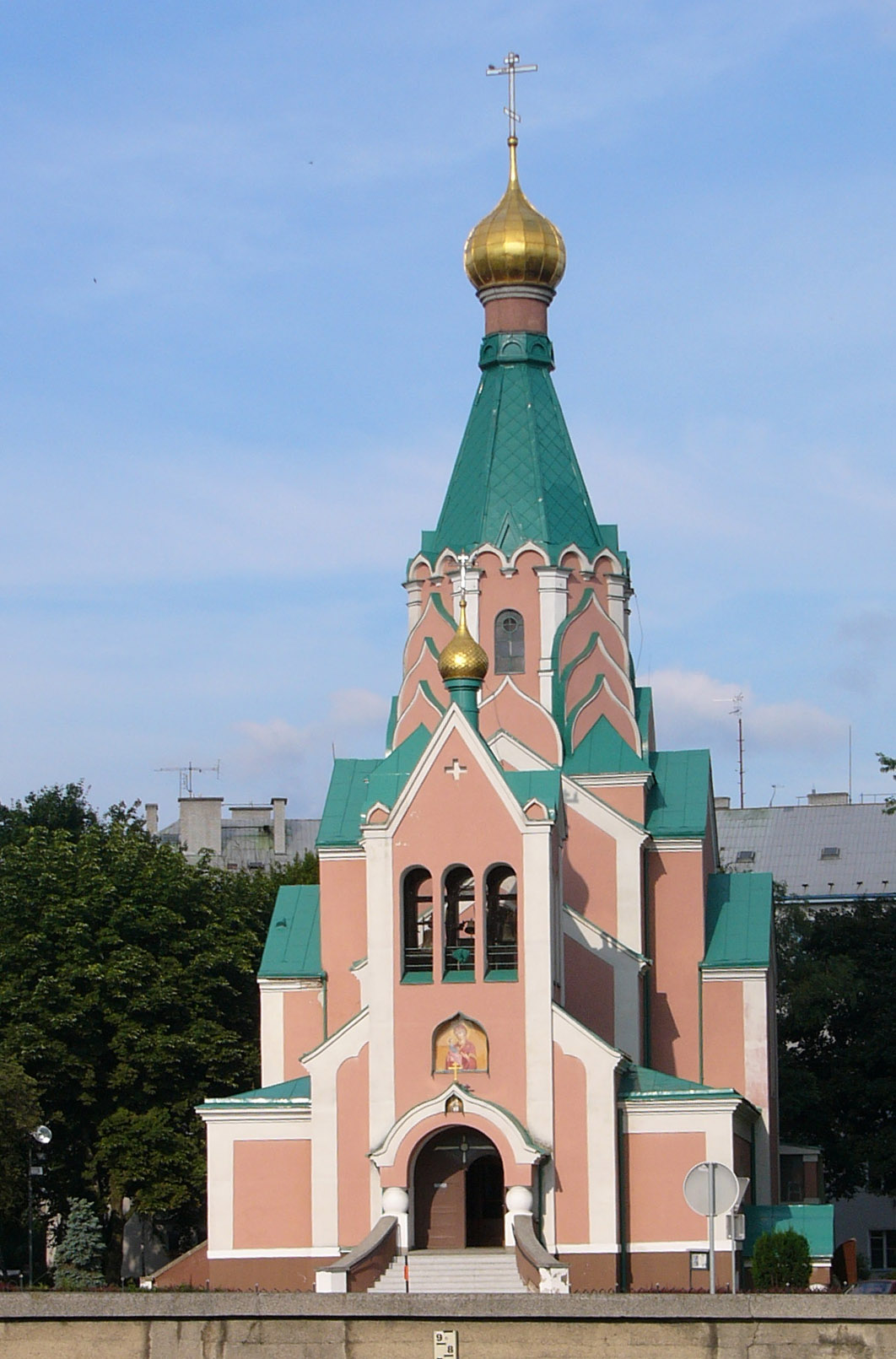
Cathedral of St. Gorazd in Olomouc

== Note ==
The list above does not include St. Barbara's Church in Kutná Hora, which, despite being often called a cathedral due to its size and elaborate Gothic architecture, never served as episcopal see.

== See also ==
- Lists of cathedrals
