= Diocese of Ostrava-Opava =

Roman Catholic diocese in Czechia

Coordinates: 49°50′N 18°17′E

Diocese of Ostrava-Opava Dioecesis Ostraviensis-Opaviensis Diecéze ostravsko-opavská

Catholic

Location
- Country: Czech Republic
- Metropolitan: Olomouc

Statistics
- Area: 6,360 km^{2} (2,460 sq mi)
- Population: Total; Catholics: (as of 2016); 1,292,170; 429,000 (33.2%)

Information
- Denomination: Catholic Church
- Rite: Latin Rite
- Cathedral: Cathedral of the Divine Saviour
- Co-cathedral: Co-Cathedral of the Assumption of the Virgin Mary, Opava
- Patron saint: St. Hedwig of Silesia

Current leadership
- Pope: Leo XIV
- Bishop: Martin David

Map
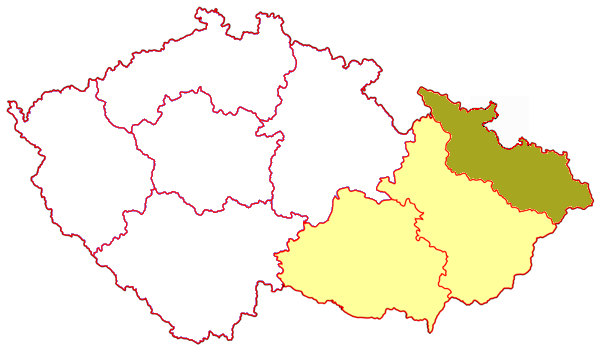

The Diocese of Ostrava-Opava (Latin: Ostraviensis-Opaviensis) is a suffragan Latin diocese in the ecclesiastical province of the Archdiocese of Olomouc in Moravskoslezský kraj, Moravia, in the Czech Republic.

The cathedral episcopal see is Katedrála Božského Spasitele, dedicated to the Divine Saviour, in Ostrava, and it also has

- a Co-Cathedral, the Co-Cathedral of the Assumption of the Virgin Mary in Opava
- a Minor Basilica: Basilica of the Visitation of Our Lady in Frýdek-Místek

== History ==
- Established on May 30, 1996 as Diocese of Ostrava–Opava / Ostravien(sis)–Opavien(sis) (Latin), on territory split off from its Metropolitan, the Archdiocese of Olomouc, which territory was part until 1978 (the former Apostolic Administration of Český Těšín) of the then Diocese of Wrocław (Poland) while that comprised all Silesia.

Attempts to erect a diocese in the territory of today's one had already been made in the past. The papal bull Suprema dispositione of December 5, 1777, by which the ecclesiastical province of Olomouc was established, provided that its suffragans should also include the Diocese of Opava (dioecesis Oppaviensis), which was yet to be erected and was supposed to cover the part of Silesia that remained under Habsburg rule (Austrian Silesia). However, this diocese was never established.

== Statistics ==
As per 2014, it pastorally served 429,300 Catholics (32.7% of 1,314,000 total) on 6,150 km² in 276 parishes and a mission with 247 priests (188 diocesan, 59 religious), 30 deacons, 218 lay religious (76 brothers, 142 sisters) and 8 seminarians.

== Episcopate ==
(all Roman rite)

Suffragan Bishops of Ostrava-Opava

- František Václav Lobkowicz, Norbertines (O. Praem.) (30 May 1996 – 17 February 2022), a Prince (by birth) of the Lobkowicz family, Vice-President of Czech Bishops' Conference (2005-01 – 2010-04-21); previously Titular Bishop of Catabum Castra (1990-03-17 – 1996-05-30) as Auxiliary Bishop of Archdiocese of Praha (Prague, Czech Republic) (1990-03-17 – 1996-05-30)
- Martin David (2023-07-04 – ...); previously auxiliary bishop (2017-04-07 – 2023-07-04), Titular Bishop of Thucca in Numidia (2017-04-07 – 2023-07-04).

== See also ==
- List of Catholic dioceses in the Czech Republic
- Roman Catholicism in the Czech Republic

== Sources ==
- GCatholic.org, with Google mapa & satellite photo - data for all sections
- Catholic Hierarchy
- Diocese website

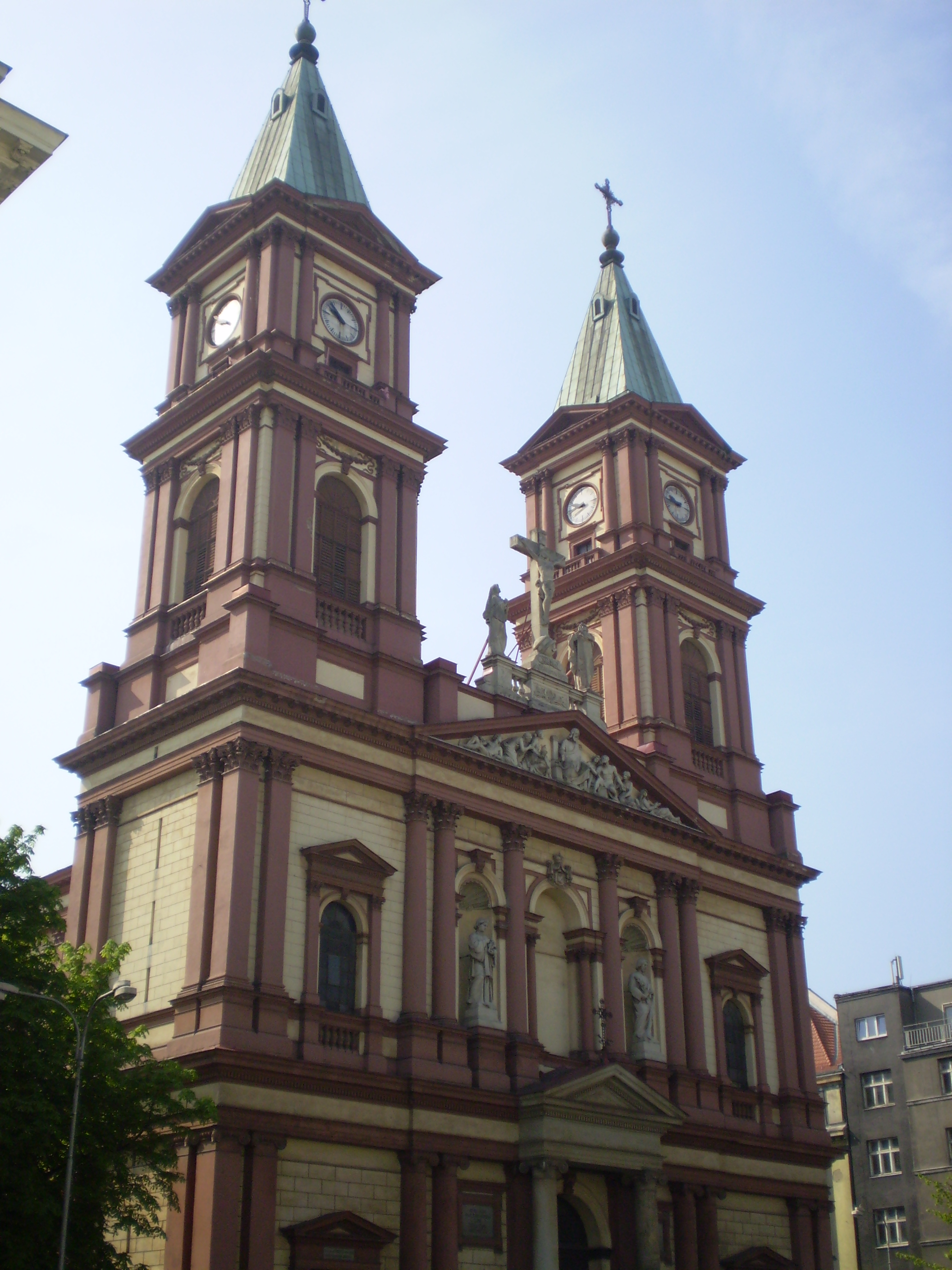
Ostrava Cathedral Holy Savior

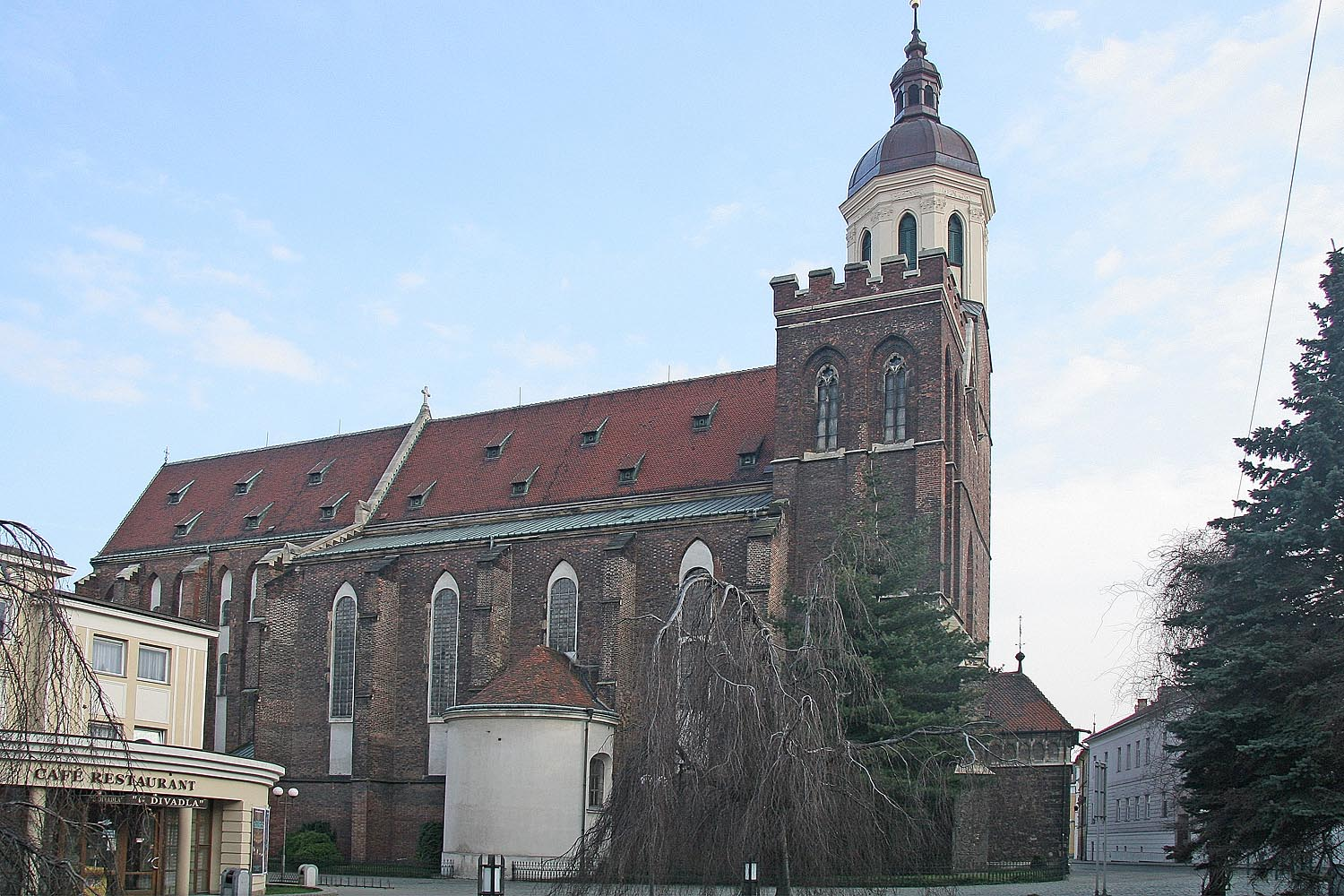
Opava Co-cathedral Virgin Mary
