= Cathedral of the Divine Saviour =

- Katedrála Božského Spasitele
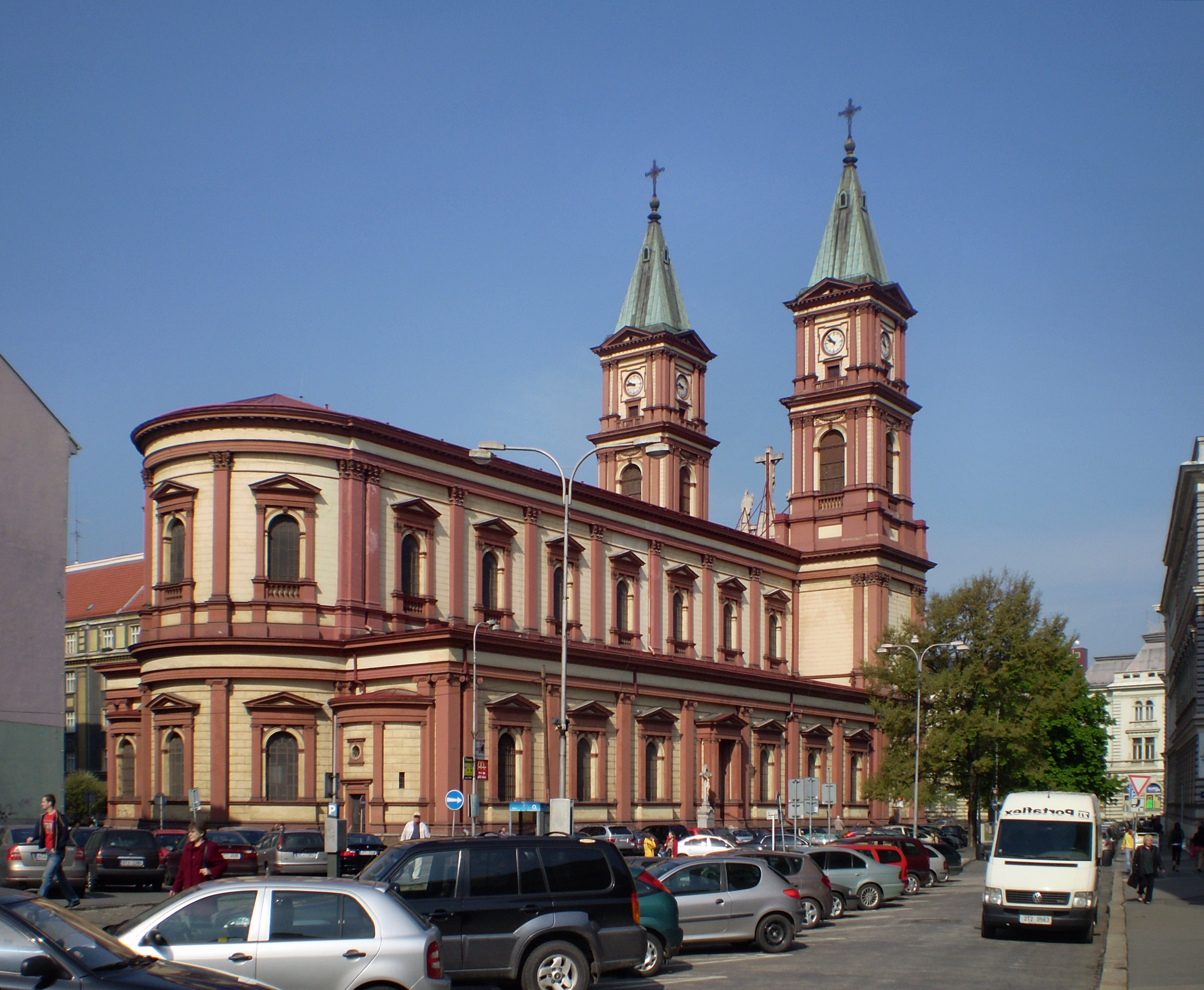

- Location in the Czech Republic
- 49°50′09″N 18°17′20″E
- Location: Ostrava
- Country: Czech Republic
- Denomination: Roman Catholic

History
- Status: Active
- Founded: 1883
- Dedication: Divine Saviour

Architecture
- Functional status: Cathedral
- Architect: Gustav Meretta
- Architectural type: Church
- Style: Neo-Romanesque
- Years built: 1883-1889

Specifications
- Capacity: 4000 people

Administration
- Diocese: Ostrava-Opava

Clergy
- Bishop: Martin David

Recording of the Cathedral's bells from 1936

Cathedral of the Divine Saviour (Czech: Katedrála Božského Spasitele), located in the center of Ostrava, is the second largest Roman Catholic cathedral in Moravia and Silesia (after the basilica in Velehrad near Uherské Hradiště). This three-nave Neo-Renaissance basilica with a semi-circular apse and two 67m high towers was built starting in 1883, and which was completed in 1889. The church was designed by Gustav Meretta, the official architect of the Archbishop of Olomouc, with the interior by Max von Ferstel.

The main nave is 14 m wide and 22 m high, the two side aisles are 7 m wide and 10 m high each. The seating capacity of the cathedral is 4,000 people. On May 30, 1996, Pope John Paul II established the Diocese of Ostrava-Opava, and soon after the basilica had been dignified into a cathedral.

In 1998, a new neo-Baroque organ was installed.

== History ==
On 23 May 1871 the city council spoke about the intention of building a new parish church, which would eventually replace the old parish church of St Wenceslas. The old church could not contain the increasing number of believers and failed to comply with official requirements for public buildings. After a fire inspection took place on 2 January 1882, the district marshal in Místek decided to build a new church. Thus, at a council meeting on 5 October 1882 the agreements for the construction of a new parish church were done.

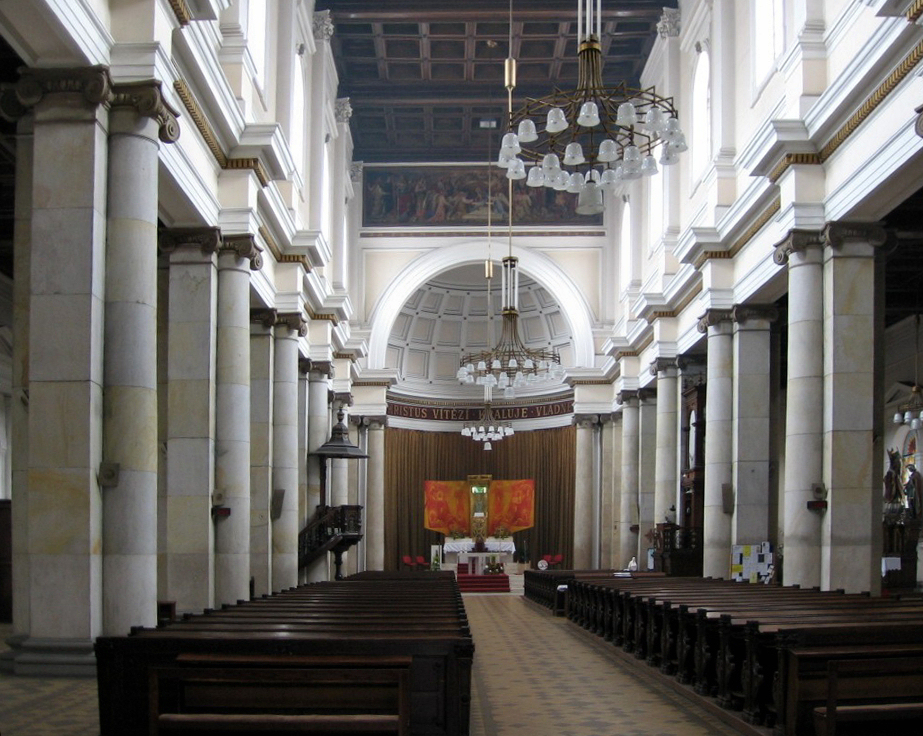
Interior of the Cathedral

The foundation stone was laid by Mayor Anton Lux and the Reverend Josef Spurný on October 4, 1883. At that time church committees were competing in Moravia which was established under provincial laws dating from 1864 and 1874. It was the supervisory and executive bodies, which were often the purchaser of furniture projects and new churches, significantly encroached into their final form. Their arguments focused, in particular, on situations where the parish volume was small.

The church of the Divine Saviour would serve 4 municipalities which, upon its construction, should contribute a proportionate financial amount. However, these villages managed their own parish church and, therefore Ostravanians' contributions to the construction of the church were often the cause of discord. Other financial flow was rather paradoxical. The Archdiocese of Olomouc, who took patronage of the church, was obliged, by patronage law, to pay a third of construction costs, worth just under 33,000 florins. Contributions also flowed in from Jewish entrepreneurs, like Baron Rotschild and the Gutmannové brothers.

== Visiting ==
Pilgrims and tourists visiting Ostrava can arrive by train, or the less expensive yet slow bus coaches, and then connect to local transportation to visit the Cathedral of the Divine Saviour downtown.

== See also ==
- List of cathedrals in the Czech Republic
