= František Václav Lobkowicz =

Czech Catholic priest and theologian (1948–2022)

His Excellency František Lobkowicz O. Praem.
- Bishop of Ostrava-Opava
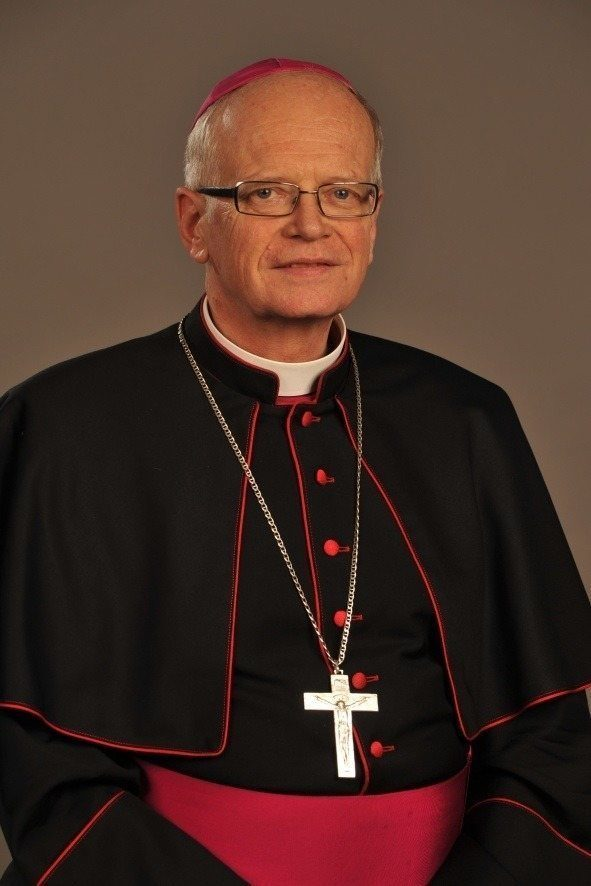
- Lobkowicz in 2017
- Church: Catholic
- Diocese: Ostrava-Opava
- Installed: 1996
- Term ended: 2022
- Predecessor: Post created
- Previous posts: Auxiliary Bishop of Prague (1990–1996); Titular bishop of Catabum Castra (1990–1996)

Orders
- Ordination: 15 August 1972
- Consecration: 7 April 1990 by František Tomášek
- Rank: Bishop

Personal details
- Born: Franz von Assisi Karl Friedrich Klemens Jaroslav Alois Leopold Gerhard Telesphorus Odilius Johann Bosco Paul Marie Prinz von Lobkowicz; 5 January 1948 Plzeň, Czechoslovakia
- Died: 17 February 2022 (aged 74) Ostrava, Czech Republic
- Denomination: Catholic
- Motto: Pro Vita Mundi
- Coat of arms

Franz von Assisi Karl Friedrich Klemens Jaroslav Alois Leopold Gerhard Telesphorus Odilius Johann Bosco Paul Marie, Prince von Lobkowicz, O. Praem. (5 January 1948 – 17 February 2022) was a Czech Catholic prelate and a member by birth of the Lobkowicz family. Lobkowicz served as titular bishop of Catabum Castra and as auxiliary bishop of the Archdiocese of Prague, Czech Republic from 1990 to 1996. He was then appointed the first bishop of the Diocese of Ostrava-Opava, Czech Republic, serving from 1996 until his death.

Lobkowicz died on 17 February 2022, at the age of 74.
