= Catabum Castra =

Ancient Roman town of North Africa

Roman Empire - Mauretania Caesariensis (125 AD)

Catabum Castra was an ancient Roman town of North Africa during the Byzantine Empire, Vandal Kingdom and Roman Empire. The town has been tentatively identified with ruins at Djidioua in Algeria.

== Titular see of Catabum Castra ==
During the Roman Empire the town of Catabum Castra was the seat of an ancient bishopric. That ancient diocese ceased to function with the Muslim conquest of the Maghreb. The diocese was, however, nominally restored in 1933 as a titular bishopric.

=== Known Bishops ===
Catabum Castra has had the following incumbents of the lowest (episcopal) rank :

- Patera (fl.484)
- Urbain Etienne Morlion, M. Afr. (1966.09.29 – 1971.01.20)
- Gabriel Lee Gab-sou (이갑수 가브리엘) (1971.07.25 – 1975.06.05)
- Simon Michael Fung Kui Heong (1975.08.29 – 1976.05.31)
- Michael Nnachi Okoro (1977.06.27 – 1983.02.19)
- František Václav Lobkowicz, O. Praem. (1990.03.17 – 1996.05.30)
- Mathias Ri Iong-hoon (이용훈 마티아) (2003.03.19 – 2008.10.10)
- Olivier Michel Marie Schmitthaeusler, M.E.P. (2009.12.24 – ...), Apostolic Vicar of Phnom Penh (Cambodia), President of Episcopal Conference of Laos and Cambodia
