= Opava =

City in the Czech Republic

- Statutory city
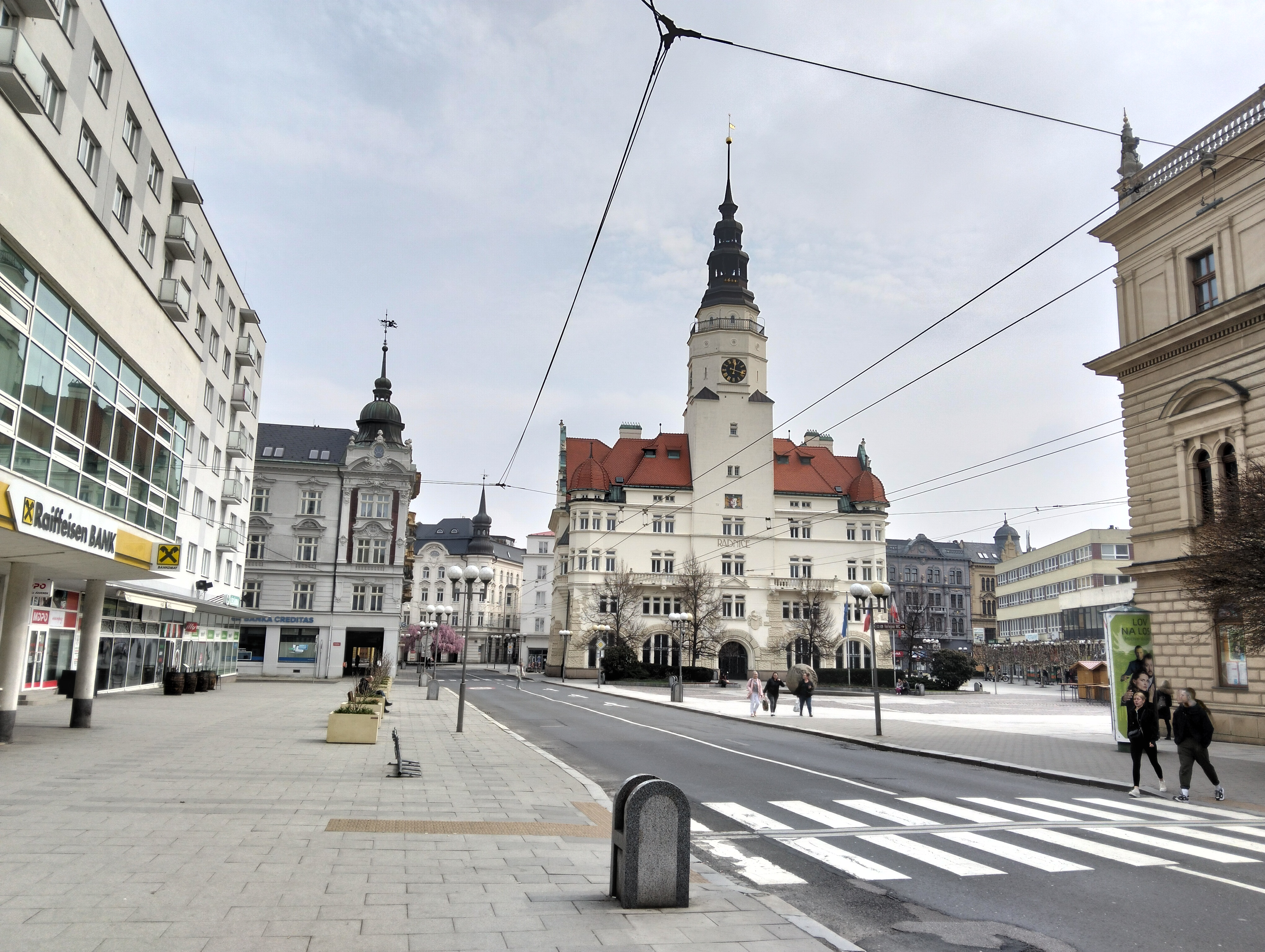
- The square Horní náměstí

- Flag Coat of arms

- Location in the Czech Republic
- Coordinates: 49°56′17″N 17°54′16″E
- Country: Czech Republic
- Region: Moravian-Silesian
- District: Opava
- First mentioned: 1195

Government
  - Mayor: Petr Czudek (OK Změna pro Opavu)

Area
  - Total: 90.57 km^{2} (34.97 sq mi)
- Elevation: 257 m (843 ft)

Population (2026-01-01)
  - Total: 54,881
  - Density: 606.0/km^{2} (1,569/sq mi)
- Time zone: UTC+1 (CET)
  - Summer (DST): UTC+2 (CEST)
- Postal code: 746 01
- Website: www.opava-city.cz

Opava (Czech pronunciation: [ˈopava]; German: Troppau, Polish: Opawa) is a city in the Moravian-Silesian Region of the Czech Republic. It has about 55,000 inhabitants. It lies on the Opava River, near the border with Poland. It is a regional centre of education and culture, known for the Silesian University in Opava and the Silesian Museum.

Opava became a town in 1224. It is one of the historical centres of Silesia and was a historical capital of Czech Silesia. The most important monuments, protected as national cultural monuments of the Czech Republic, are the Co-Cathedral of the Assumption of the Virgin Mary, the Chapel of the Holy Cross from the year 1394, and the Petr Bezruč City House of Culture.

== Administrative division ==
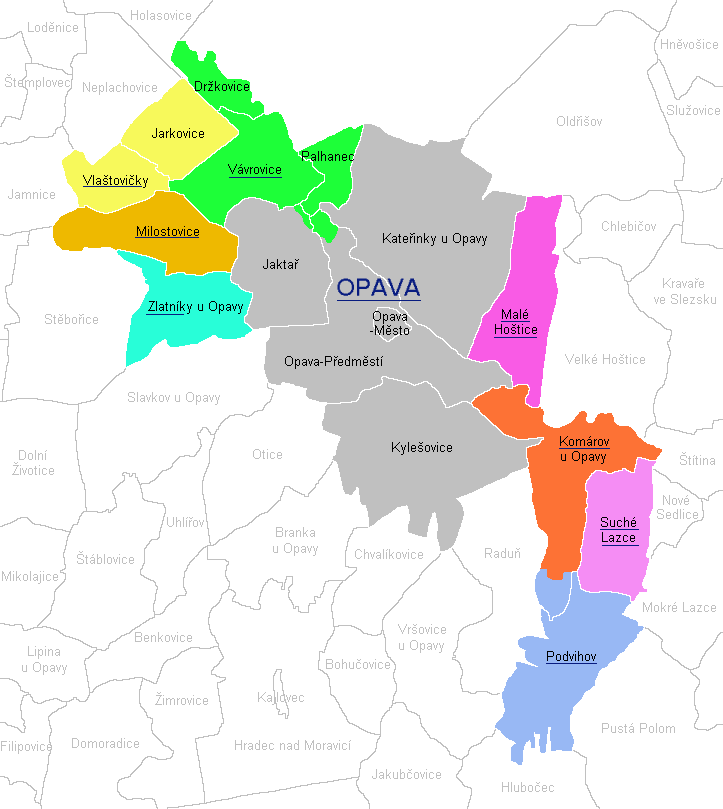
City parts of Opava (shown in color)

Opava consists of eight self-governing city parts in the suburbs and the central part that is directly administered. In addition, Opava consists of 15 municipal parts, whose borders do not respect the boundaries of the city parts (in brackets population according to the 2021 census):

- undivided Opava
  - Město (3,485)
  - Předměstí (22,212)
  - Kateřinky (12,795)
  - Kylešovice (7,311)
  - Jaktař (2,182)
- Komárov (1,323)
  - Komárov (1,323)
- Malé Hoštice (1,710)
  - Malé Hoštice (1,654)
  - Pusté Jakartice (56)
- Milostovice (305)
  - Milostovice (305)
- Podvihov (754)
  - Komárovské Chaloupky (155)
  - Podvihov (599)
- Suché Lazce (1,034)
  - Suché Lazce (1,034)
- Vávrovice (1,317)
  - Vávrovice (1,036)
  - Předměstí (237)
  - Jaktař (44)
- Vlaštovičky (385)
  - Vlaštovičky (385)
- Zlatníky (333)
  - Zlatníky (333)

== Etymology ==
The city is named after the Opava River. The name of the river arose from the old Celtic words apa, opa, i.e. 'water'.

== Geography ==
Opava is located about 27 kilometres (17 mi) northwest of Ostrava. Most of its territory lies in the Opava Hilly Land within the Silesian Lowlands, but it also extends to the Nízký Jeseník range in the southeast and northwest. The highest point of the municipal territory is Hůrka at 530 m (1,740 ft) above sea level.

Opava is situated at the confluence of the Opava and Moravice rivers. The Opava River flows through the city centre.

Lake Stříbrné jezero is an artificial lake on the outskirts of the city created by the flooding of the former gypsum quarry. It is used for recreational purposes.

=== Climate ===
Climate data for Opava, 1991–2020 normals, extremes 1961–present
Month	Jan	Feb	Mar	Apr	May	Jun	Jul	Aug	Sep	Oct	Nov	Dec	Year
Record high °C (°F)	14.5 (58.1)	20.3 (68.5)	24.2 (75.6)	28.3 (82.9)	31.8 (89.2)	35.1 (95.2)	35.8 (96.4)	37.1 (98.8)	33.2 (91.8)	25.7 (78.3)	21.7 (71.1)	16.5 (61.7)	37.1 (98.8)
Mean daily maximum °C (°F)	2.2 (36.0)	4.0 (39.2)	8.4 (47.1)	14.8 (58.6)	19.4 (66.9)	22.9 (73.2)	25.5 (77.9)	25.3 (77.5)	19.6 (67.3)	13.9 (57.0)	8.0 (46.4)	3.2 (37.8)	13.9 (57.0)
Daily mean °C (°F)	−0.8 (30.6)	0.3 (32.5)	3.6 (38.5)	8.8 (47.8)	13.5 (56.3)	16.9 (62.4)	18.8 (65.8)	18.3 (64.9)	13.4 (56.1)	8.9 (48.0)	4.6 (40.3)	0.4 (32.7)	8.9 (48.0)
Mean daily minimum °C (°F)	−4.1 (24.6)	−3.4 (25.9)	−0.8 (30.6)	2.6 (36.7)	7.0 (44.6)	10.5 (50.9)	12.1 (53.8)	11.8 (53.2)	8.1 (46.6)	4.7 (40.5)	1.3 (34.3)	−2.6 (27.3)	3.9 (39.0)
Record low °C (°F)	−29.4 (−20.9)	−26.7 (−16.1)	−27.0 (−16.6)	−11.6 (11.1)	−3.5 (25.7)	−1.0 (30.2)	3.0 (37.4)	−0.2 (31.6)	−4.0 (24.8)	−8.4 (16.9)	−19.4 (−2.9)	−28.8 (−19.8)	−29.4 (−20.9)
Average precipitation mm (inches)	20.6 (0.81)	19.7 (0.78)	30.5 (1.20)	38.2 (1.50)	67.8 (2.67)	82.1 (3.23)	82.8 (3.26)	61.9 (2.44)	64.0 (2.52)	44.1 (1.74)	33.1 (1.30)	23.8 (0.94)	568.6 (22.39)
Average snowfall cm (inches)	15.2 (6.0)	15.8 (6.2)	8.7 (3.4)	2.8 (1.1)	0.0 (0.0)	0.0 (0.0)	0.0 (0.0)	0.0 (0.0)	0.0 (0.0)	0.5 (0.2)	5.2 (2.0)	12.9 (5.1)	61.0 (24.0)
Average relative humidity (%)	80.0	77.7	74.7	70.0	72.2	73.2	71.5	72.6	78.3	80.0	81.9	81.8	76.2
Mean monthly sunshine hours	56.5	78.9	129.5	188.2	217.2	219.2	237.8	232.4	163.4	115.1	61.5	48.3	1,748.1
Source 1: Czech Hydrometeorological Institute
Source 2: NOAA

== History ==
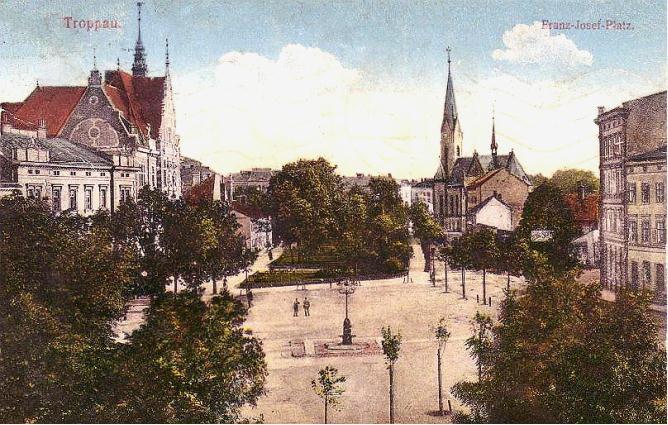
Troppau (now Opava) in 1900

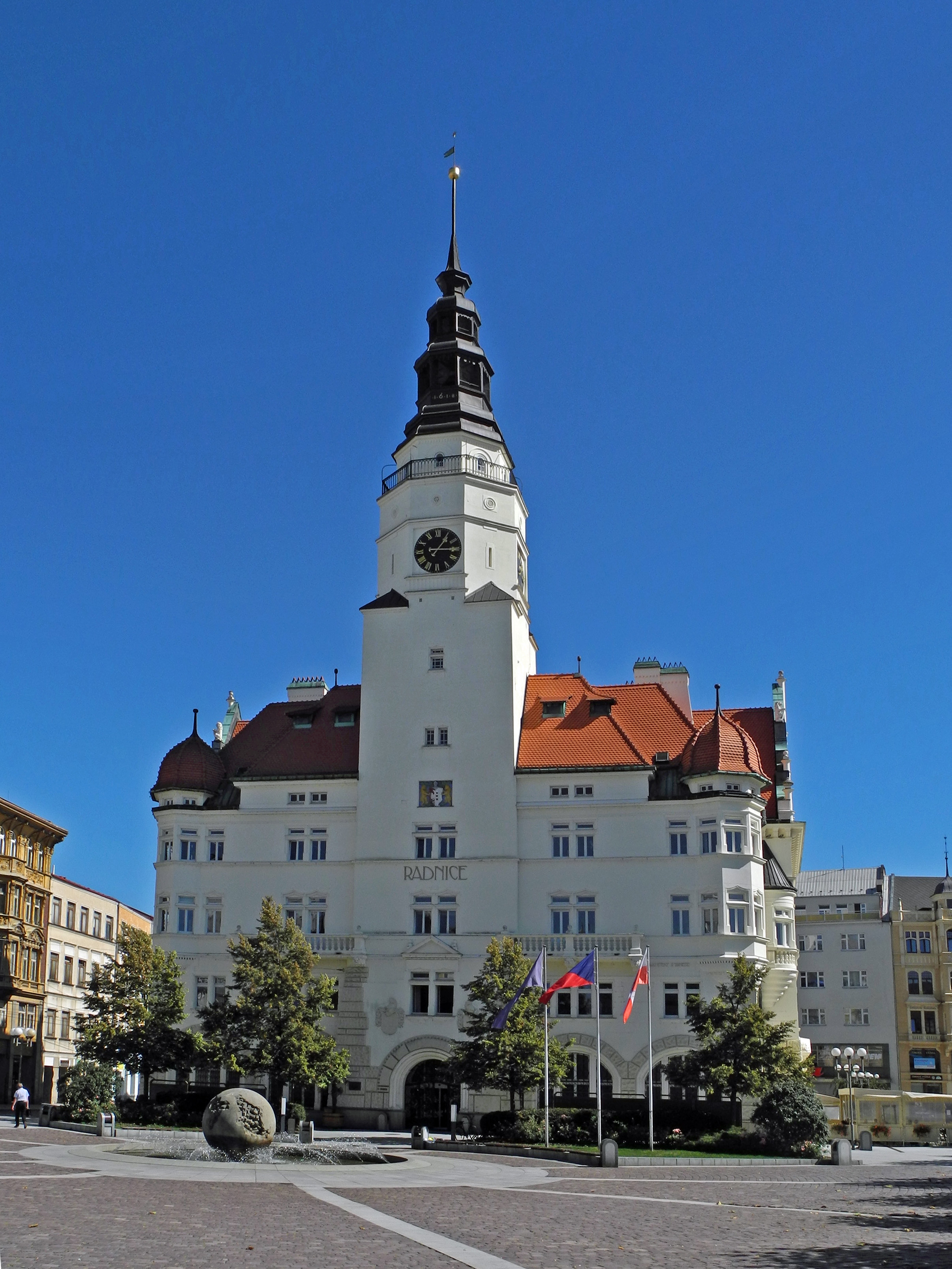
City hall

The German name of the town, Troppau, the Czech name, Opava, and the Polish name, Opawa, all have deep roots in the name of the local river, the Oppa or Opava. The German name has evolved from "zu Oppa", meaning "on the Oppa". The first written mention of the town is from 1195, and in 1224 it received town privileges. In 1269, the Duchy of Troppau was established, with the town as its capital.

From 1427 to 1431, the duchy was ruled by the Hussites. In 1485, it was acquired by Matthias Corvinus and ruled by Hungarians until 1526. In 1613, Karl I of Liechtenstein became Duke of Troppau and merged the duchy with the Duchy of Krnov.

After the majority of Silesia was annexed by the Kingdom of Prussia during the War of the Austrian Succession after 1740, the remaining Silesian territory still under the control of the Habsburg monarchy became known as Austrian Silesia, with its capital in the city (1742–1918). The Congress of Troppau took place here from 24 October to 23 December 1820.

According to the Austrian census of 1910, the town had 30,762 inhabitants, 29,587 of whom had permanent residence there. The census asked people for their native language, which showed that 27,240 (92%) were German-speaking, 2,039 (6.9%) were Czech-speaking and 274 (0.9%) were Polish-speaking. Jews were not allowed to declare Yiddish, and most of them thus declared German as their native language. The main religious group was Roman Catholics with 28,379 (92.2%), followed by Protestants with 1,155 (3.7%) and Jews with 1,112 (3.6%).

After the defeat of Austria-Hungary in World War I, in 1919 the town became part of Czechoslovakia and the national government established its name as Opava. It was then part the Sudetenland, a name coined for the predominantly German-speaking parts pf the new state.

In 1938, Opava was ceded to Nazi Germany as a result of the Munich Agreement. It was administered as a part of Reichsgau Sudetenland. On 22 April 1945, Opava was occupied by the Soviet Red Army at the cost of enormous war damage. In 1945–1946, the German population was expelled under terms of Beneš decrees and the city was resettled with Czechs. On 1 January 1946, the municipalities of Jaktař, Kateřinky and Kylešovice were joined to Opava. After the war, entire new residential areas and industrial plants were built.

While the Duchy of Opava has ceased to exist, the title of Duke of Troppau continues, with Hans-Adam II, Prince of Liechtenstein being the current incumbent.

== Demographics ==
Historical population

Year	Pop.	±%
1869	27,011	—
1880	32,105	+18.9%
1890	35,698	+11.2%
1900	42,043	+17.8%
1910	47,361	+12.6%

Year	Pop.	±%
1921	49,366	+4.2%
1930	54,263	+9.9%
1950	40,663	−25.1%
1961	48,091	+18.3%
1970	53,269	+10.8%

Year	Pop.	±%
1980	58,778	+10.3%
1991	62,815	+6.9%
2001	61,382	−2.3%
2011	58,351	−4.9%
2021	55,146	−5.5%

Source: Censuses

== Economy ==
Opava is home especially to the engineering, food, paper and pharmaceutical industries. The largest company is Teva Czech Industries, a manufacturer of medicinal products, whose predecessor was founded in Opava in 1883. It employs about 1,600 people.

The largest non-industrial employers are the hospital and the psychiatric hospital.

== Culture ==
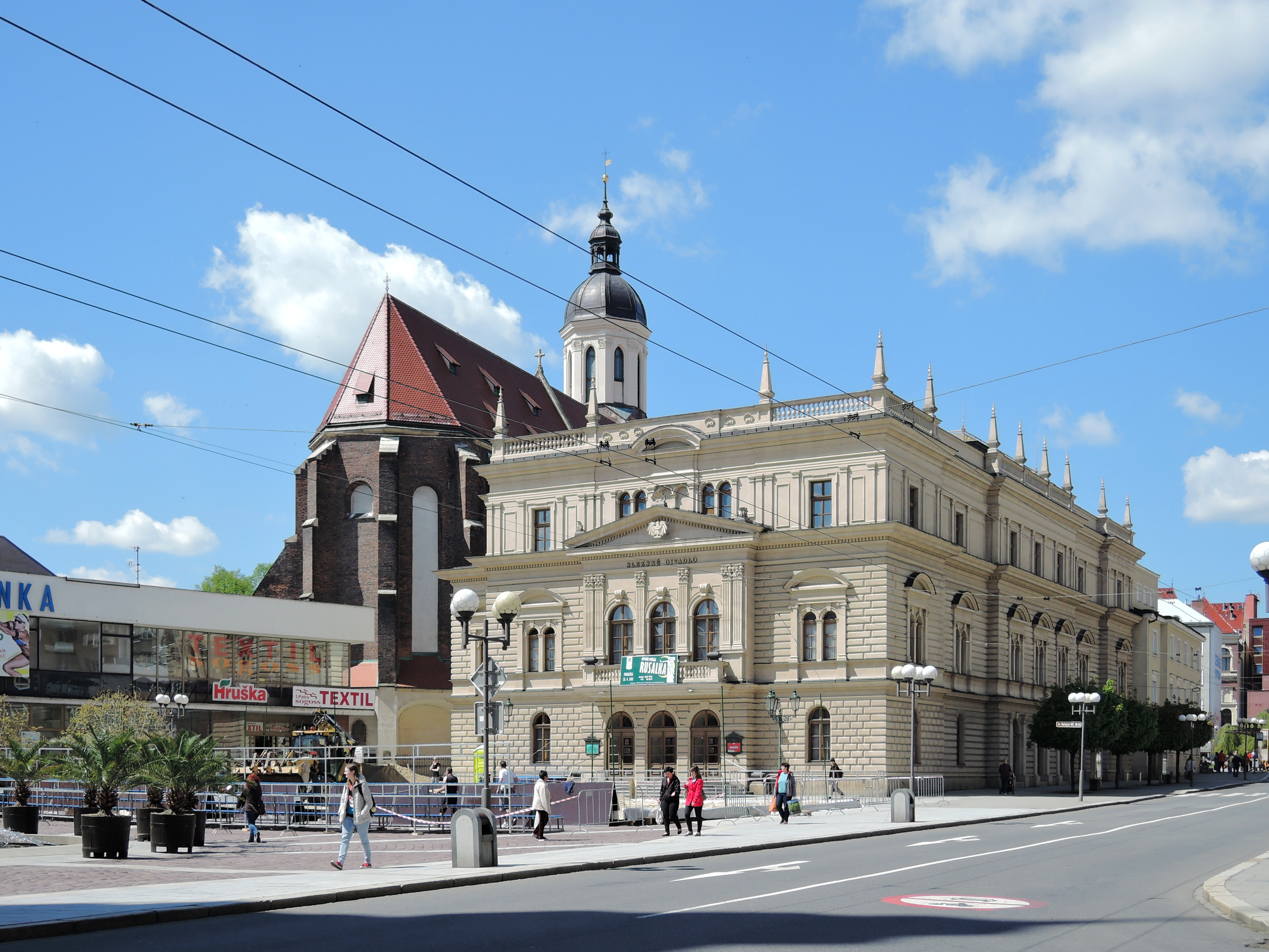
Silesian Theatre and Co-Cathedral of the Assumption of the Virgin Mary

Opava is an important cultural centre of Opavian Silesia. The Silesian Theatre in Opava was founded in 1805.

== Education ==
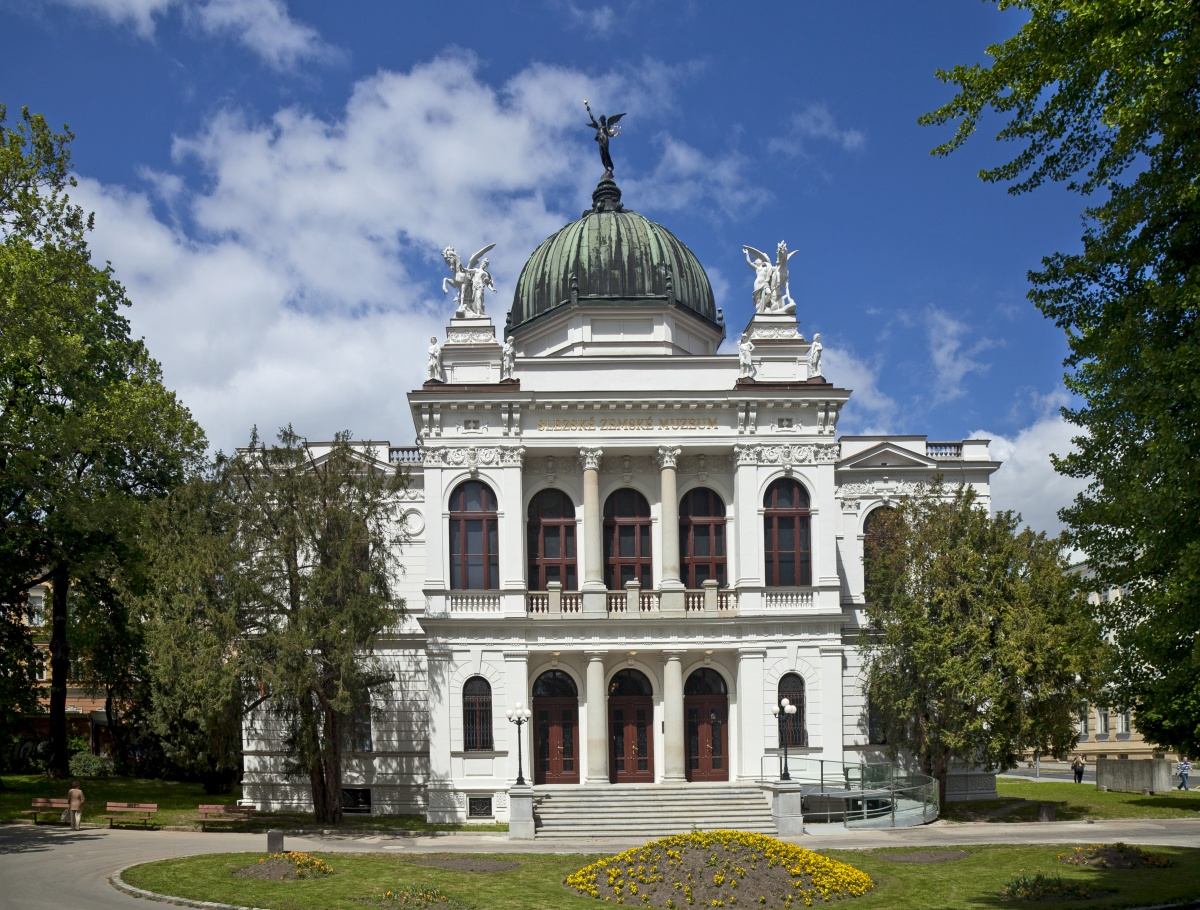
Silesian Museum

Opava is home to the Silesian University, the only public university in the country not situated in a regional capital. It was established in 1991.

== Sport ==
The city's football club SFC Opava plays in the Czech National Football League, the second tier of the Czech football league system.

== Sights ==
One of the two main landmarks of Opava is the city hall on the square Horní náměstí and its white tower, known as Hláska. A one-storey city hall and the tower were built in 1614–1618. However, the less representative town hall building around the tower was demolished in 1902 and replaced with a new one in the Neo-Renaissance style.

The second main landmark is the Co-Cathedral of the Assumption of the Virgin Mary. It is the largest building in the Czech Republic built in the so-called Silesian Brick Gothic style. A solid prismatic tower was built in the late 13th century and a higher south tower was built in the early 14th century, both towers were originally intended as part of a city hall. The church building between the towers dates from the mid-14th century. In 1996, the church became the second Episcopal church of the Ostrava-Opava diocese, and therefore a co-cathedral. With 102 metres (335 ft), the southern church tower is the highest tower in Silesia.

There are three monuments, protected as national cultural monuments. Besides the co-cathedral, there is the Chapel of the Holy Cross, which dates from 1394, and the Petr Bezruč City House of Culture; a Neo-Renaissance house, built in 1908–1910 according to the design by Leopold Bauer.

The Silesian Museum, founded in 1814, is the oldest public museum in the Czech Republic. It has about 2,400,000 exhibition items and is the third largest museum in the country.

== Notable people ==
- Martin of Opava (?–1278) historian and cleric
- Johann Palisa (1848–1925), Austrian astronomer
- Eduard von Böhm-Ermolli (1856–1941), Austrian field marshal
- Felix Woyrsch (1860–1944), German composer
- Joseph Maria Olbrich (1867–1908), Austrian architect
- Petr Bezruč (1867–1958), poet
- Max Eschig (1872–1927), French music publisher
- Esther Hoffe (1906–2007), Czech-Israeli secretary
- Franz Bardon (1909–1958), occultist
- Joy Adamson (1910–1980), naturalist and author
- Helmut Niedermeyer (1926–2014), Austrian businessman
- Josef Gebauer (1942–2004), historian
- Boris Rösner (1951–2006), actor
- Pavel Složil (born 1955), tennis player
- Bohdan Sláma (born 1967), film director
- Kamil Mrůzek (born 1977), kayaker
- Nataša Novotná (born 1977), dancer and choreographer
- Zdeněk Pospěch (born 1978), footballer
- Zuzana Ondrášková (born 1980), tennis player
- Lukáš Vondráček (born 1986), pianist
- Libor Kozák (born 1989), footballer

== Twin towns – sister cities ==
Opava is twinned with:

- Katowice, Poland
- Kearney, United States
- Liptovský Mikuláš, Slovakia
- Racibórz, Poland
- Roth, Germany
- Zugló (Budapest), Hungary
- Żywiec, Poland
