= Co-Cathedral of the Assumption of the Virgin Mary, Opava =

Coordinates: 49.9386°N 17.9008°E

Co-Cathedral of the Assumption of the Virgin Mary
- Konkatedrála Nanebevzetí Panny Marie
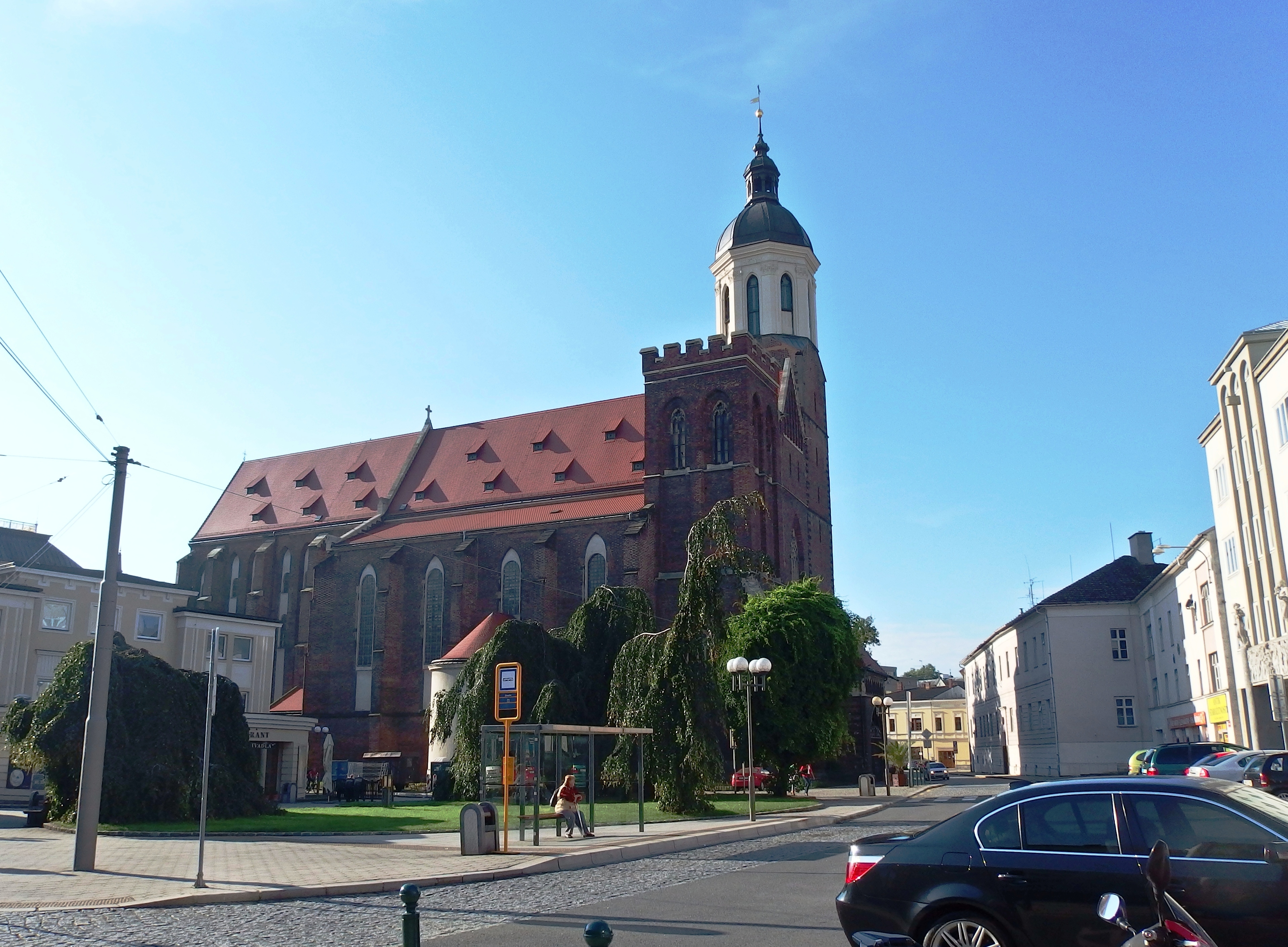
- Co-Cathedral of the Assumption of the Virgin Mary
- Location: Opava
- Country: Czech Republic
- Denomination: Roman Catholic Church

The Co-Cathedral of the Assumption of the Virgin Mary (Czech: Konkatedrála Nanebevzetí Panny Marie; also called Our Lady of the Assumption Co-Cathedral or simply Opava Cathedral) is a Gothic church in the historic city centre of Opava in the Czech Republic.

== History ==
Its construction is believed to have started during the reign of the Bohemian King Ottokar I (1198–1230). The cathedral is constructed of red bricks, having three naves and two towers. It is built in the fourteenth century Gothic style. Its southern tower is 102 metres tall (a few metres taller than Prague Castle Tower) and remains the tallest church tower in Silesia.

The establishment of the Church of the Assumption in Opava is associated with the Teutonic Knights. The construction of the church probably began shortly after 1204. Details about an earlier Romanesque church at this place are vague. But, a letter from King Wenceslaus I, dated 12 May 1237, already mentions the rectory in Opava. Construction of the church stopped after the death of Ottokar II. It resumed again after the return of his illegitimate son Nicholas I. Over time, the church underwent some additional Baroque and neo-Gothic modifications, suffered from fires in 1689 and 1759, and survived heavy shelling from the Red Army during World War II. Until today, the church remains one of the largest buildings in Opava. Since 1996, it is the second seat of the bishop of Ostrava-Opava (hence "Co-cathedral"). It serves as a Catholic church until this very day.

In 1995, the building was declared a national cultural monument of the Czech Republic.

== See also ==
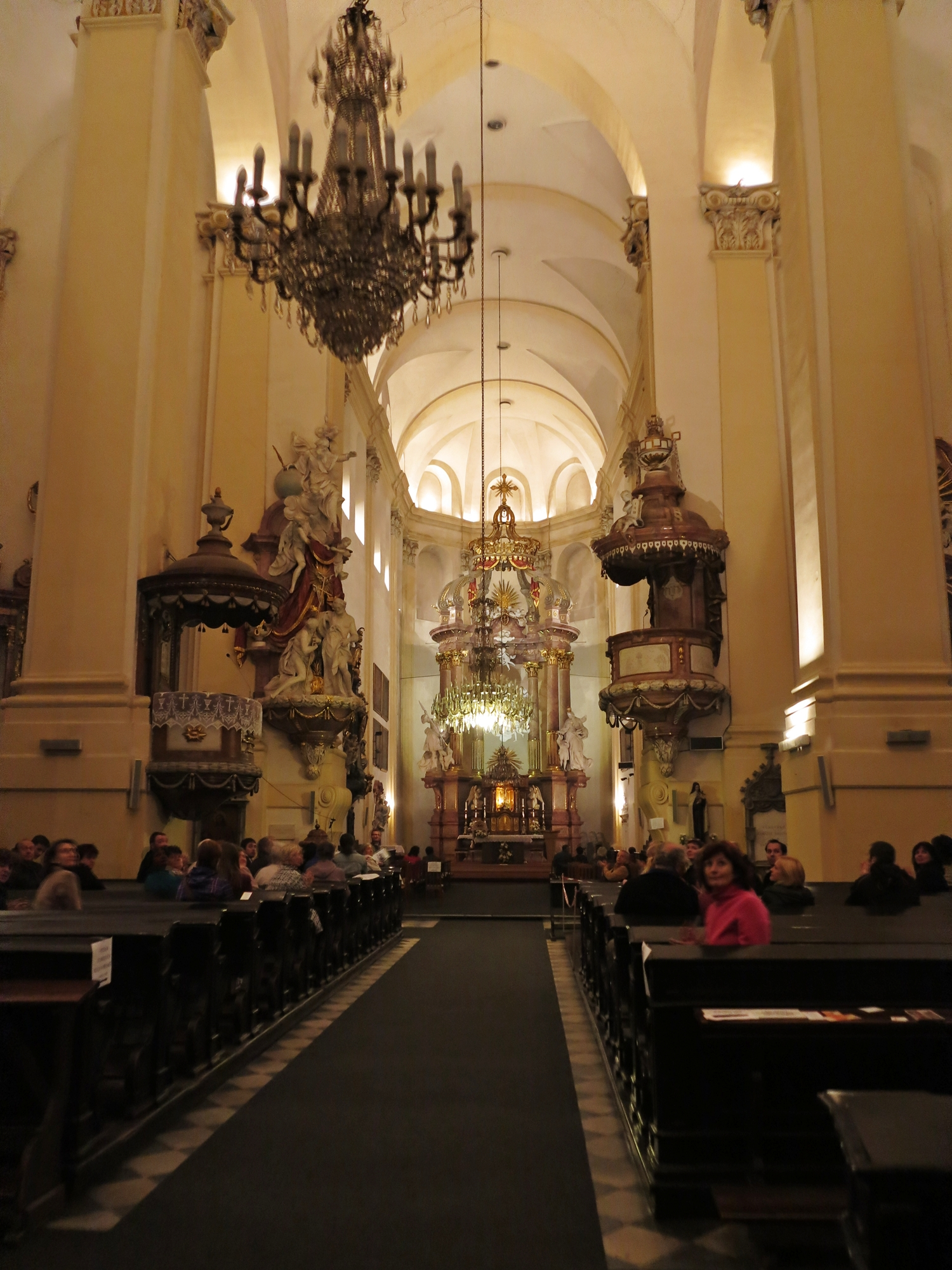
Interior

- Roman Catholicism in the Czech Republic
- Assumption of Mary
