= Benevides =

Benevides may refer to:

== Places ==
- Benevides, Brazil
- Benevides Formation

== People ==
- Cecilia Benevides Meireles (1901–1964), Brazilian writer and educator
- Diego de Benavides, 8th Count of Santisteban (1607–1666), Spanish military officer, administrator, and writer
- Felipe Benevides (born 1989), Brazilian football player
- Mike Benevides (born 1968), Canadian football coach
- Robert Benevides (1930–1993), partner of U.S. actor Raymond Burr and wine entrepreneur
- Salvador Correia de Sá e Benevides (circa 1602–1688), Portuguese admiral and administrator
- Santos Benevides (1823–1891), officer in the Confederate army during the U.S. Civil War
- Thiago Benevides Gonçalves (born 1987), Brazilian football player
- Benevides Juan Ramirez (died 1782), Spanish painter

== Other ==
- Mictopsichia benevides, a species of moth

== See also ==
- Benavides (disambiguation)
- Benavidez
