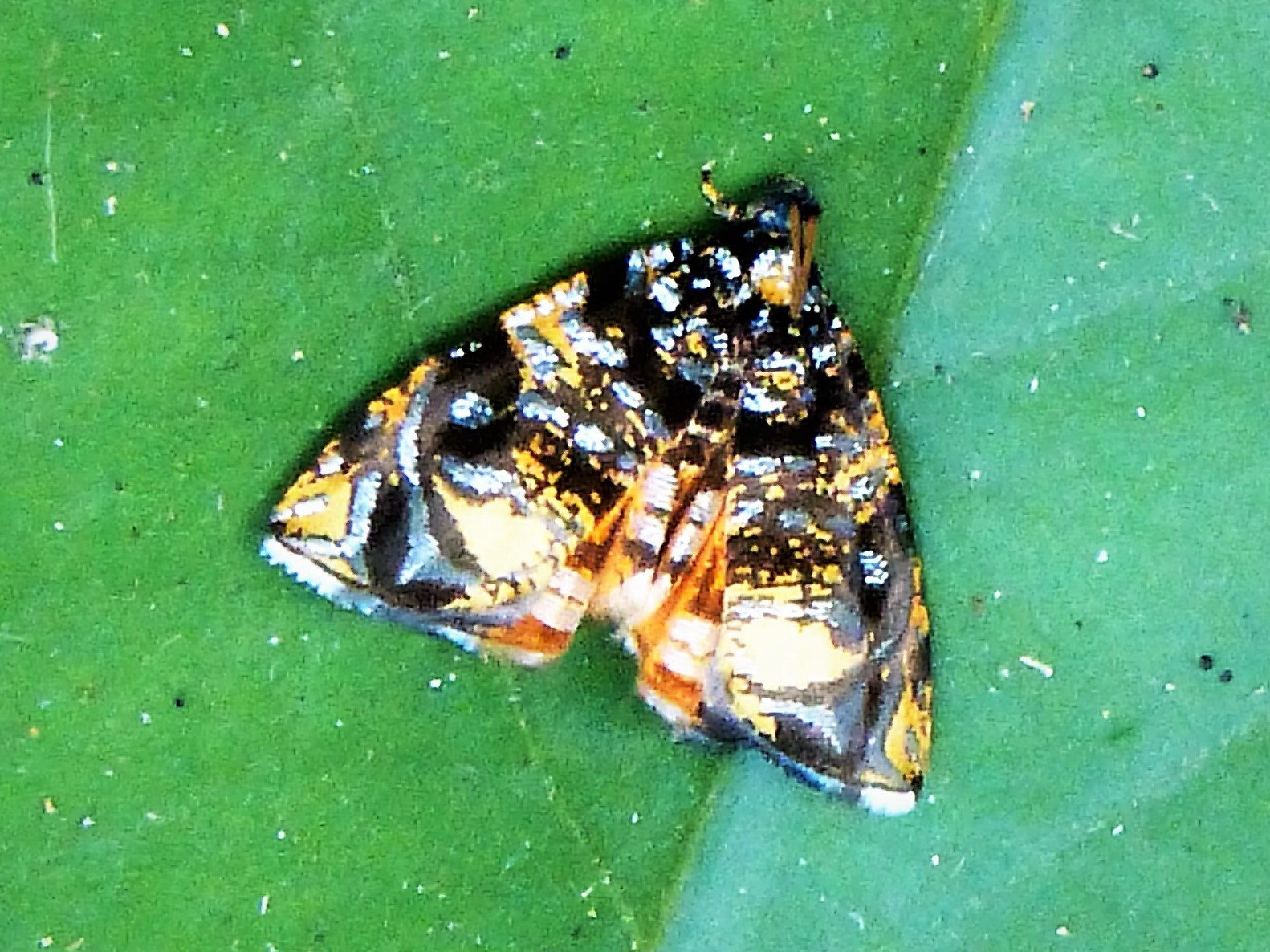
- Mictopsichia hubneriana

Scientific classification
- Domain: Eukaryota
- Kingdom: Animalia
- Phylum: Arthropoda
- Class: Insecta
- Order: Lepidoptera
- Family: Tortricidae
- Subfamily: Tortricinae
- Tribe: Archipini
- Genus: Mictopsichia; Hubner, [1825]

Synonyms
- Micropsychia Agassiz, 1848; Mictopsychia Riley, 1889; Mictropsichia Heppner, 1978

= Mictopsichia =

Genus of tortrix moths

Mictopsichia is a genus of moths belonging to the family Tortricidae.

== Species ==
- Mictopsichia atoyaca Razowski, 2009
- Mictopsichia benevides Razowski, 2009
- Mictopsichia boliviae Razowski, 2009
- Mictopsichia buenavistae Razowski, 2009
- Mictopsichia callicharis Meyrick, 1921
- Mictopsichia chlidonata Razowski, 2009
- Mictopsichia chirripoana Razowski, 2011
- Mictopsichia cubae Razowski, 2009
- Mictopsichia cubilgruitza Razowski, 2009
- Mictopsichia egae Razowski, 2009
- Mictopsichia gemmisparsana (Walker, 1863)
- Mictopsichia guatemalae Razowski, 2009
- Mictopsichia hubneriana (Stoll, in Cramer, 1791)
- Mictopsichia jamaicana Razowski, 2009
- Mictopsichia janeae Razowski & Pelz, 2010
- Mictopsichia marowijneae Razowski, 2009
- Mictopsichia mincae Razowski, 2009
- Mictopsichia miocentra Meyrick, 1920
- Mictopsichia misahuallia Razowski, 2011
- Mictopsichia ornatissima (Dognin, 1909)
- Mictopsichia panamae Razowski, 2009
- Mictopsichia pentargyra Meyrick, 1921
- Mictopsichia periopta Meyrick, 1913
- Mictopsichia renaudalis (Stoll, in Cramer, 1791)
- Mictopsichia rivadeneirai Razowski & Pelz, 2010
- Mictopsichia shuara Razowski & Pelz, 2010
- Mictopsichia torresi Razowski & Pelz, 2010

== Former species ==
- Mictopsichia durranti Walsingham, 1914
- Mictopsichia fuesliniana (Stoll, in Cramer, 1781)
- Mictopsichia godmani Walsingham, 1914

== See also ==
- List of Tortricidae genera
