= El Museo Aja =

Museum in El Salvador

El Museo Aja, also known as the Aha Museum of Folk Cultures and Arts and the Center Culture is Peace, is a museum in Santa Ana, El Salvador.

== Introduction ==
The museum and the center were founded on September 21, 2006, developed by the Siglo XXIII (23rd Century) movement. It is a project for social transformation through culture, and promotes an active and living culture of peace. It affirms the belief of the goodwill inherent in every human being, the creative potential of humankind, and, therefore, the ability to create a just society, based on gender equity, inclusive of all ages and without discrimination based on ethnic, social, religious, political, and sexual differences.

The cultural center and exhibition hall is dedicated to the cultural development of the Salvadoran and international peoples. Its goal is to promote ethical and aesthetic practices for a world of peace and the health of the planet.

The center is a project of the Benavides-Marroquín family honoring the memory of Theodore Benavides and Eva Marroquín de Benavides, who dreamed of a world without hunger but with a cultured population committed to global and planetary citizenship. It is one of the sponsors of the Siglo XXIII peace process. It is represented by Marta Benavides.

Exhibits change often. The current exhibitions are "Building a Future of Peace," "2008 International Year of Libraries," "The Ibero-American Year of Youth," and "Peace and the Environment." There are also special exhibits on rag dolls, clay, and the International Criminal Court.

The museum and center is a non-partisan, voluntary, and entirely non-profit. Its membership is made up of individuals, as well as cultural and educational organizations.
