= General Sinclair =

General Sinclair may refer to:

- George Brian Sinclair (1928–2020), British Army major general
- John Sinclair (British Army officer) (1897–1977), British Army major general
- Patrick Sinclair (1736–1820), British Army lieutenant general
- Santiago Sinclair (born 1927), Chilean Army general
- Volodymyr Sinclair (1879—1946), Ukrainian People's Army major general

== See also ==
- William Sinclair-Burgess (1880–1964), New Zealand Military Forces major general
- Ewen Sinclair-MacLagan (1868–1948), British Army major general
