= Government Junta of Chile (1973) =

Military dictatorship of Chile (1973–90)

The Government Junta of Chile (Spanish: Junta de Gobierno de Chile) was the military junta established to rule Chile during the military dictatorship that followed the overthrow of President Salvador Allende in the 1973 Chilean coup d'état. The Government Junta was the executive and legislative branch of government until 17 December 1974, when Augusto Pinochet was formally declared President of Chile. After that date, it functioned strictly as a legislative body until the return to democracy in 1990.

== Installation of the regime ==
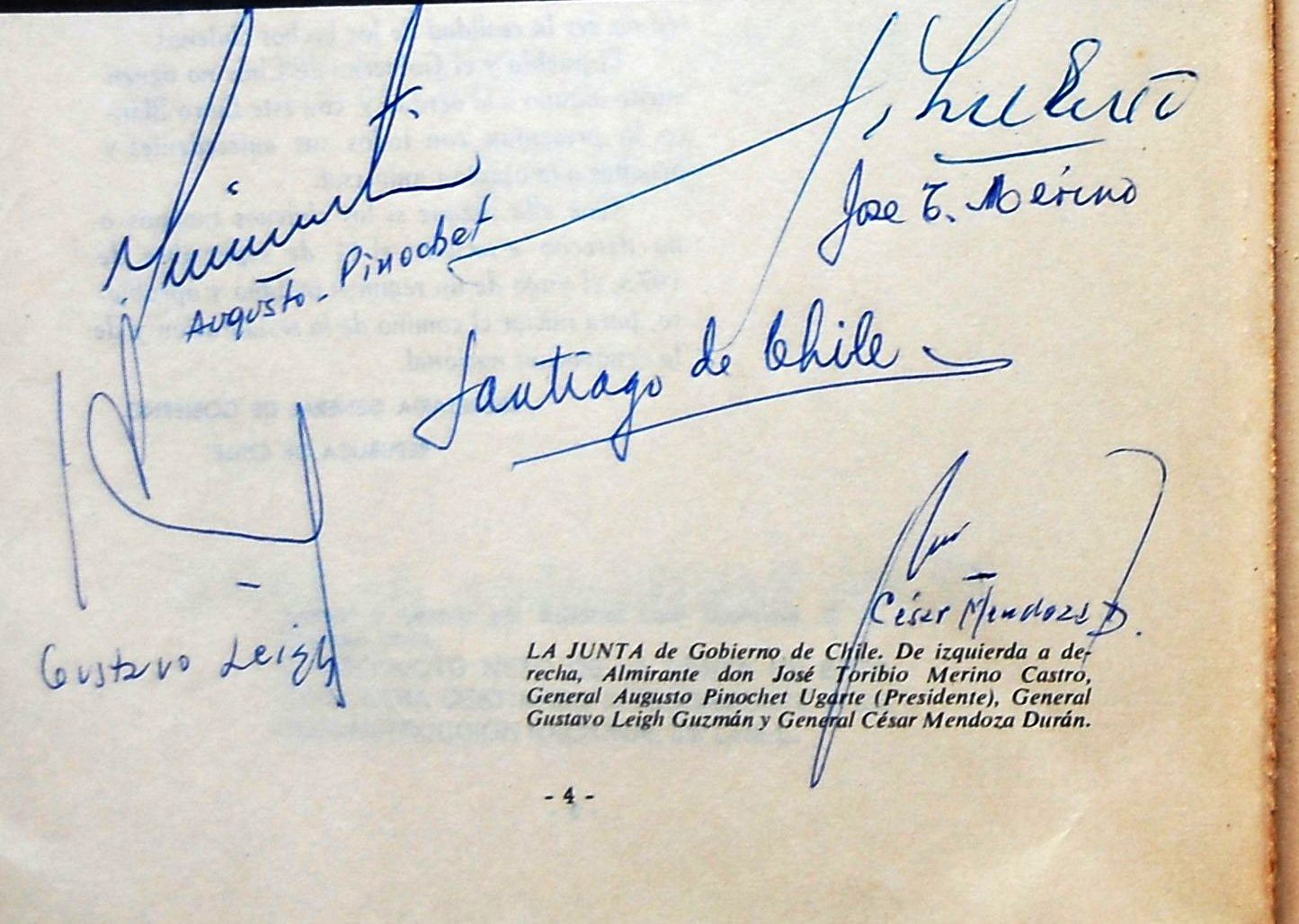
Signatures of members of the Government Junta, 1973

On 11 September 1973, the day of the coup, the military officers issued an Act of Constitution. The act established a junta government that immediately suspended the constitution, suspended Congress, imposed strict censorship and curfew, proscribed the leftist parties that had constituted Salvador Allende's Popular Unity coalition, and halted all political activity, effectively establishing a dictatorship. The judicial branch continued to operate under the Junta, and nominally had jurisdiction over its repressive activities, but rarely interfered.

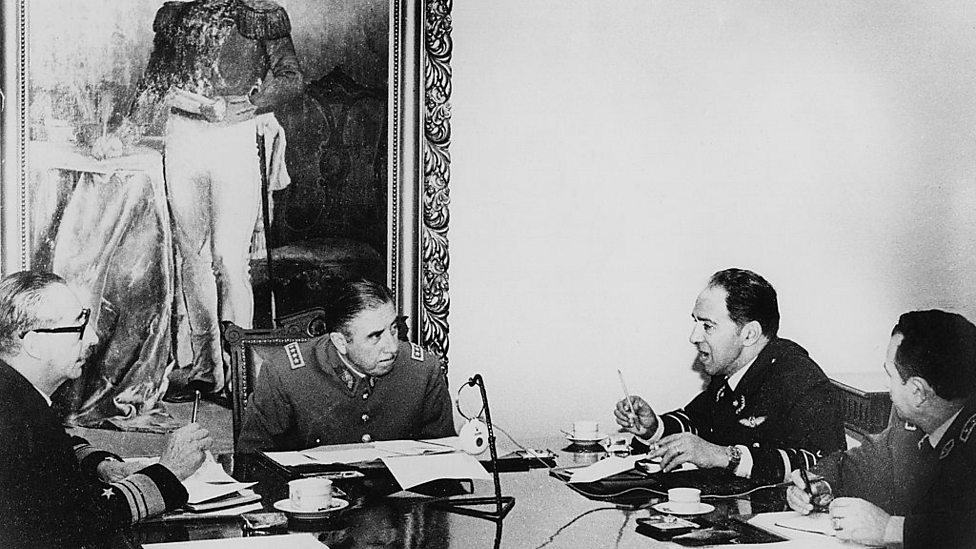
Session of the Government Junta in 1973: José Toribio Merino, Augusto Pinochet, Gustavo Leigh, and César Mendoza (from left to right)

The new junta was made up of General Augusto Pinochet representing the Army, General Gustavo Leigh representing the Air Force, Admiral José Toribio Merino representing the Navy, and General César Mendoza representing the Carabineros (police).

The Nixon administration, which had worked to create the conditions for the coup, promptly recognized the junta government and supported it in consolidating power.

== History and leadership ==
Once the Junta was in power, General Pinochet soon consolidated his control. Since he was the commander-in-chief of the oldest branch of the military forces (the Army), he was made the head of the military junta. This position was originally to be rotated among the four branches, but was later made permanent. He began by retaining sole chairmanship of the junta as "Supreme Chief of the Nation" from 27 June 1974 until 17 December 1974, when he was proclaimed President. Gustavo Leigh, commander of the Air Force, opposed the consolidation of the legislative and executive branches, but agreed to Pinochet's presidency under pressure from Merino and Mendoza, who warned that the junta would split otherwise if he did not sign on.

General Leigh, head of the Air Force, became increasingly opposed to Pinochet's policies and the permanent state of military government. Pinochet eventually tired of Leigh's opposition and dismissed him from the regime in 1978, declaring him unfit for office and forcing him into retirement on 24 July 1978, in a very tense moment that almost caused a military insurrection. Air Force General Fernando Matthei replaced Leigh as junta member.

General Pinochet took over as President following a referendum that approved a new constitution. On 11 March 1981, he resigned his position in the Junta, and was replaced by the most senior General officer from the Army, who was nominated by himself. After that date, the Junta remained only as a legislative body under the presidency of Admiral Merino, until the return to democracy in 1990.

In 1985, three communists were found murdered, with their throats slit, by the side of a road. The guilty party turned out to be the Carabineros' secret service, and the Caso Degollados ("case of the slit throats") caused General César Mendoza's resignation on 2 August 1985. Mendoza was replaced by General Rodolfo Stange. Stange, who had risen through the ranks of the Carabineros to become General Subdirector of the police force in 1982, was appointed to General Director and served ex officio as a member of the military junta. Stange continued serving as general director after Pinochet's dictatorship ended in 1990.

== Political repression and human rights abuses ==
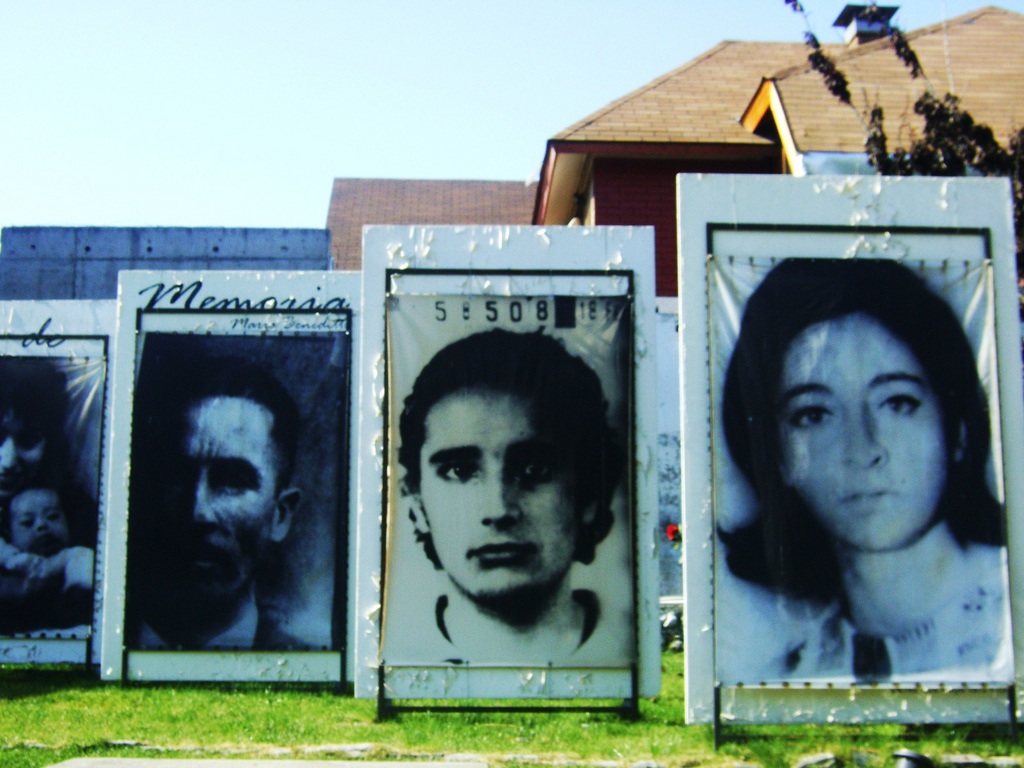
Disappeared people in art at Parque por la Paz at Villa Grimaldi in Santiago de Chile

He shut down parliament, suffocated political life, banned trade unions, and made Chile his sultanate. His government disappeared 3,000 opponents, arrested 30,000 (torturing thousands of them) ... Pinochet's name will forever be linked to the Desaparecidos, the Caravan of Death, and the institutionalized torture that took place in the Villa Grimaldi complex.

— Thor Halvorssen, president of the Human Rights Foundation

Immediately after the coup the junta moved to crush their left-wing opposition. Besides pursuing revolutionary guerilla groups, the junta embarked on a campaign against political opponents and perceived leftists in the country, as well as family members of dissidents. According to the Rettig Commission, 2,279 people who disappeared were killed for political reasons or by political violence, and 27,000 incarcerated, most of them for long periods of time, without trials and in special secluded facilities in remote locations. According to the 2004 Valech Report, approximately 32,000 people were tortured, and 1,312 officially exiled. Among the cases of torture were approximately 3,400 cases of sexual abuse of women.

Many of the exiled were received abroad, in particular in Argentina, East Germany and Sweden, as political refugees; however, they were followed in their exile by the DINA secret police, in the frame of Operation Condor which linked South-American dictatorships together against political opponents. Intelligence agencies including the United States CIA worked to assassinate many of those in exile around the world, including former Chilean ambassador to the United States Orlando Letelier and, allegedly, former Chilean President Eduardo Frei Montalva (1964–70).

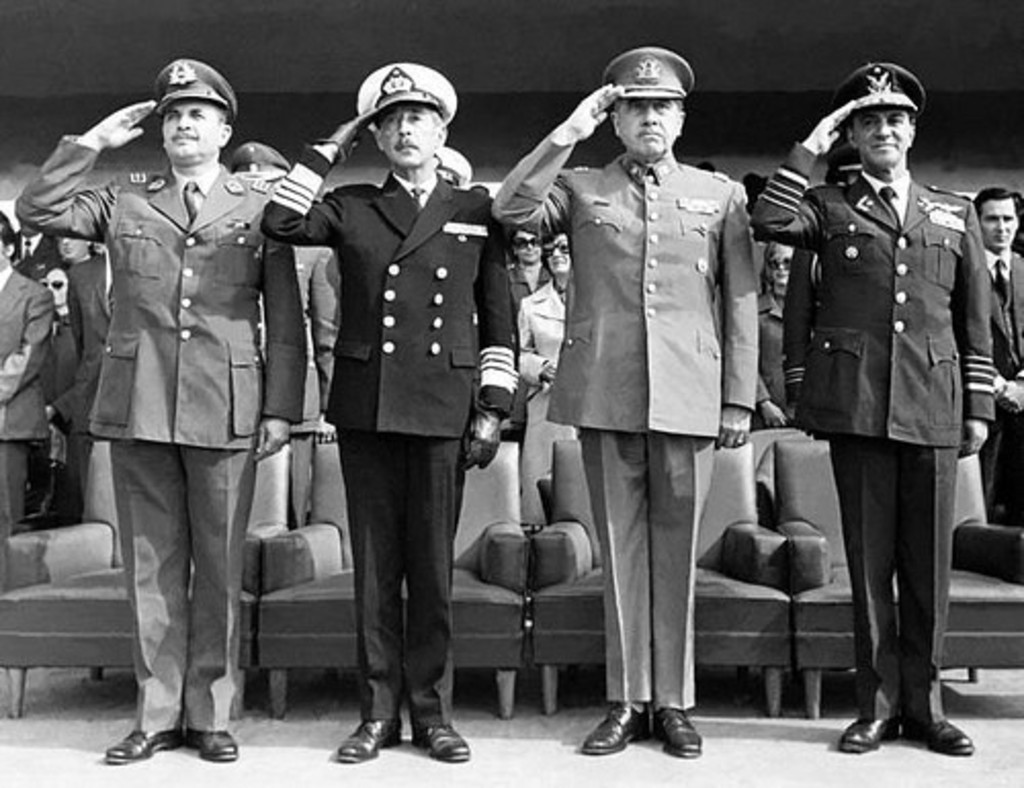
Members of the Government Junta from 1973 to 1978: César Mendoza, José Toribio Merino, Augusto Pinochet, and Gustavo Leigh (from left to right)

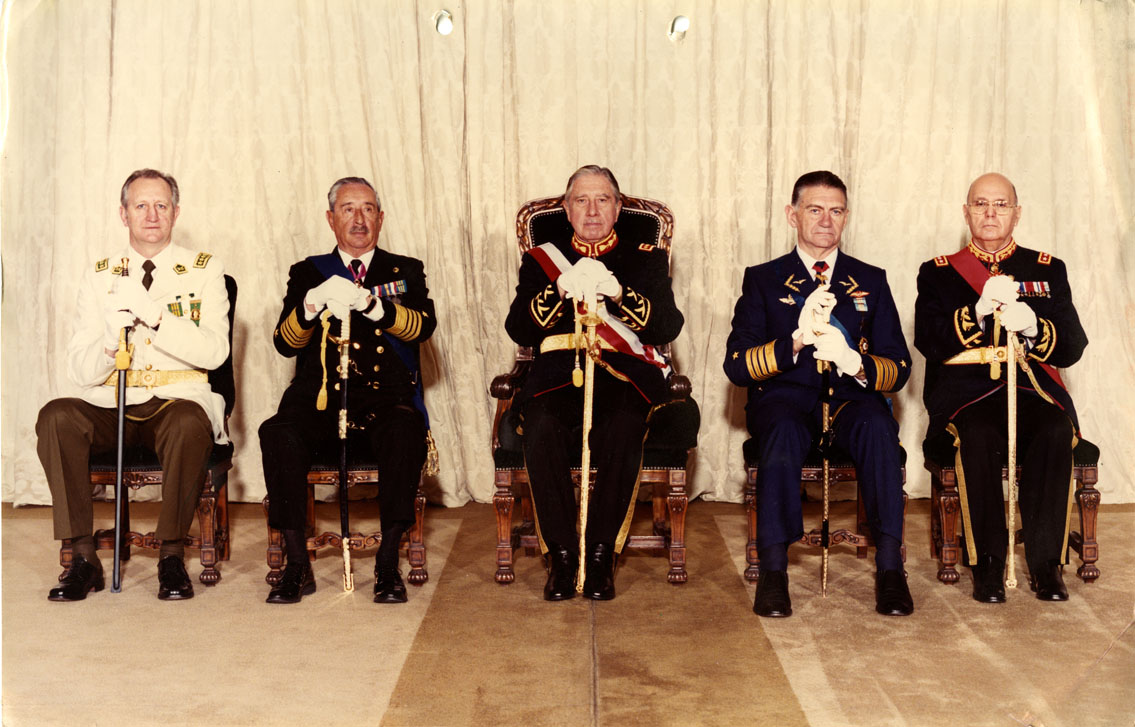
Members of the Government Junta in 1985: Rodolfo Stange, José Toribio Merino, Augusto Pinochet, Fernando Matthei, and César Benavides (from left to right). At this point, Pinochet was no longer officially a member of the Government Junta.

== Leaders ==
Representing	Name	Took office	Left office
Chilean Army	Augusto Pinochet	11 September 1973	11 March 1981
Chilean Army	César Benavides	11 March 1981	2 December 1985
Chilean Army	Julio Canessa	2 December 1985	31 December 1986
Chilean Army	Humberto Gordon	31 December 1986	29 November 1988
Chilean Army	Santiago Sinclair	29 November 1988	2 January 1990
Chilean Army	Jorge Lucar Figueroa	2 January 1990	11 March 1990
Chilean Navy	José Toribio Merino	11 September 1973	8 March 1990
Chilean Navy	Jorge Martínez Busch	8 March 1990	11 March 1990
Chilean Air Force	Gustavo Leigh	11 September 1973	24 July 1978
Chilean Air Force	Fernando Matthei	24 July 1978	11 March 1990
Carabineros	César Mendoza	11 September 1973	2 August 1985
Carabineros	Rodolfo Stange	2 August 1985	11 March 1990

== See also ==
- 1973 Chilean coup d'état
- Project FUBELT
- Military dictatorship of Chile (1973–1990)
- History of Chile
- List of government juntas of Chile
- List of Chilean coups d'état
- No (film about the return to democracy)
