= General Benavides =

General Benavides may refer to:

- Antonio José Benavides (born 1961), Venezuelan Army major general
- César Benavides (1912–2011), Chilean Army general
- Óscar R. Benavides (1876–1945), Peruvian Army general

== See also ==
- Nazario Benavídez (1802–1858), Argentine brigadier general
