= Chamaepsichia rubrochroa =

Scientific classification
- Domain: Eukaryota
- Kingdom: Animalia
- Phylum: Arthropoda
- Class: Insecta
- Order: Lepidoptera
- Family: Tortricidae
- Genus: Chamaepsichia
- Species: C. rubrochroa

Binomial name
- Chamaepsichia rubrochroa Razowski, 2009

Species of moth

Chamaepsichia rubrochroa is a species of moth of the family Tortricidae. It is found in Bolivia.

The wingspan is about 19 mm. The forewings are similar to Chamaepsichia durranti, but the markings are atrophying.

== Etymology ==
The name refers to the colouration of the species and is derived from Latin ruber (meaning red) and Greek chroa or chroos (meaning skin of the body).
