= Santiago Sinclair =

Chilean Army general (1927–2025)

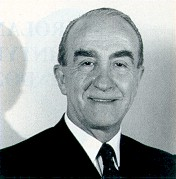

Member of the Senate
- In office 11 March 1990 – 11 March 1998
- Succeeded by: Julio Canessa

Member of the Military Junta
- In office 30 November 1988 – 2 January 1990
- President: Augusto Pinochet
- Preceded by: Humberto Gordon
- Succeeded by: Jorge Lucar

Chief of the Presidential Staff
- In office 17 October 1979 – 6 December 1985
- President: Augusto Pinochet
- Preceded by: René Escauriaza
- Succeeded by: Sergio Valenzuela Ramírez

Personal details
- Born: 29 December 1927 Valdivia, Chile
- Died: 28 December 2025 (aged 97) Santiago, Chile
- Spouse: Doris Manley
- Children: 4
- Education: Bernardo O'Higgins Military Academy

Santiago Sinclair Oyaneder (29 December 1927 – 28 December 2025) was a Chilean Army general and member of the Government Junta from 1988 to 1990 that ruled Chile from 1973–1990. The Supreme Court of Chile condemned him in 2023 for crimes against human rights.

Sinclair died in Santiago on 28 December 2025, at the age of 97.

== Biography ==
=== Family and youth ===
He was born in Santiago on 29 December 1927. He was the son of Santiago Sinclair and Graciela Oyaneder. He married Doris Manley Ramírez, and they had four children.

== Military career ==
He entered the Military School at the age of fourteen and graduated in 1948 with the rank of officer. From that point onward, he developed an extensive career in the Chilean Army, holding various positions throughout his service.

Among his assignments, he served as a military observer in the Suez Canal in 1967 and later as deputy director of the War Academy in 1973, a position that led to his appointment as commander of the 2nd Armored Cavalry Regiment “Cazadores.”

During the military regime of General Augusto Pinochet Ugarte, he held several senior posts. In 1975, he was appointed military attaché in South Korea. In 1977, he became Director of Army Operations, and the following year, Director of Personnel. In 1979, he was appointed Minister and Chief of the Presidential General Staff, and in 1982 assumed the role of Minister and head of the Presidential Advisory Committee (COAP), remaining in that position until 21 November 1985.

On that date, he assumed the position of Vice Commander-in-Chief of the Army. On 30 November 1988, in his capacity as Vice Commander-in-Chief, he became a full member of the Military Government Junta, representing the Commander-in-Chief of the Army, a post then held by Augusto Pinochet. Within the Junta, he presided over the Fourth Legislative Commission. In 1989, he retired from active military service.

At the end of the military regime and in accordance with the constitutional provisions in force at the time, on 19 December 1989 he was appointed senator by the National Security Council, in his capacity as former Vice Commander-in-Chief of the Army. He served as senator for the legislative period 1990–1998.

=== Judicial proceedings ===
On 6 August 2020, the Santiago Court of Appeals convicted him for crimes committed in October 1973 during the passage through the city of Valdivia of the so-called “Caravan of Death.”

He died in Santiago on 28 December 2025.

=== Honors ===
In 1980, he was awarded the Grand Cross of the Order of the Southern Cross of Brazil.
