= CE INSA =

- Centro Escolar Instituto Nacional de Santa Ana

Location
- San Salvador, El Salvador; El Salvador
- Coordinates: 13.9796418°N 89.5663954°W

Information
- Established: 26 February 1899
- Website: centroescolarinsa.org
- Last updated: 14 December 2017

CE INSA (Centro Escolar Instituto Nacional de Santa Ana; English: National School Center Institute of Santa Ana) is a high school located in Santa Ana, El Salvador.

The school has four main departments: Commerce (Comercio), General and Industrial (Industrial) and 7th to 9th grade (tercer ciclo). It is the only public school that actually competes among different branches, sports for example. It has become one of the most known public schools in the region because of its "marching band" and spot discipline. CE INSA offers evening classes and distance education on Saturdays.
