= Mictopsichia cubilgruitza =

Scientific classification
- Domain: Eukaryota
- Kingdom: Animalia
- Phylum: Arthropoda
- Class: Insecta
- Order: Lepidoptera
- Family: Tortricidae
- Genus: Mictopsichia
- Species: M. cubilgruitza

Binomial name
- Mictopsichia cubilgruitza Razowski, 2009

Species of moth

Mictopsichia cubilgruitza is a species of moth of the family Tortricidae. It is found in Guatemala.

The wingspan is about 14 mm.

== Etymology ==
The name refers to the type locality, Cubilgruitz.
