= Mictopsichia chirripoana =

Scientific classification
- Domain: Eukaryota
- Kingdom: Animalia
- Phylum: Arthropoda
- Class: Insecta
- Order: Lepidoptera
- Family: Tortricidae
- Genus: Mictopsichia
- Species: M. chirripoana

Binomial name
- Mictopsichia chirripoana Razowski, 2011

Species of moth

Mictopsichia chirripoana is a species of moth of the family Tortricidae. It is found in Costa Rica.
