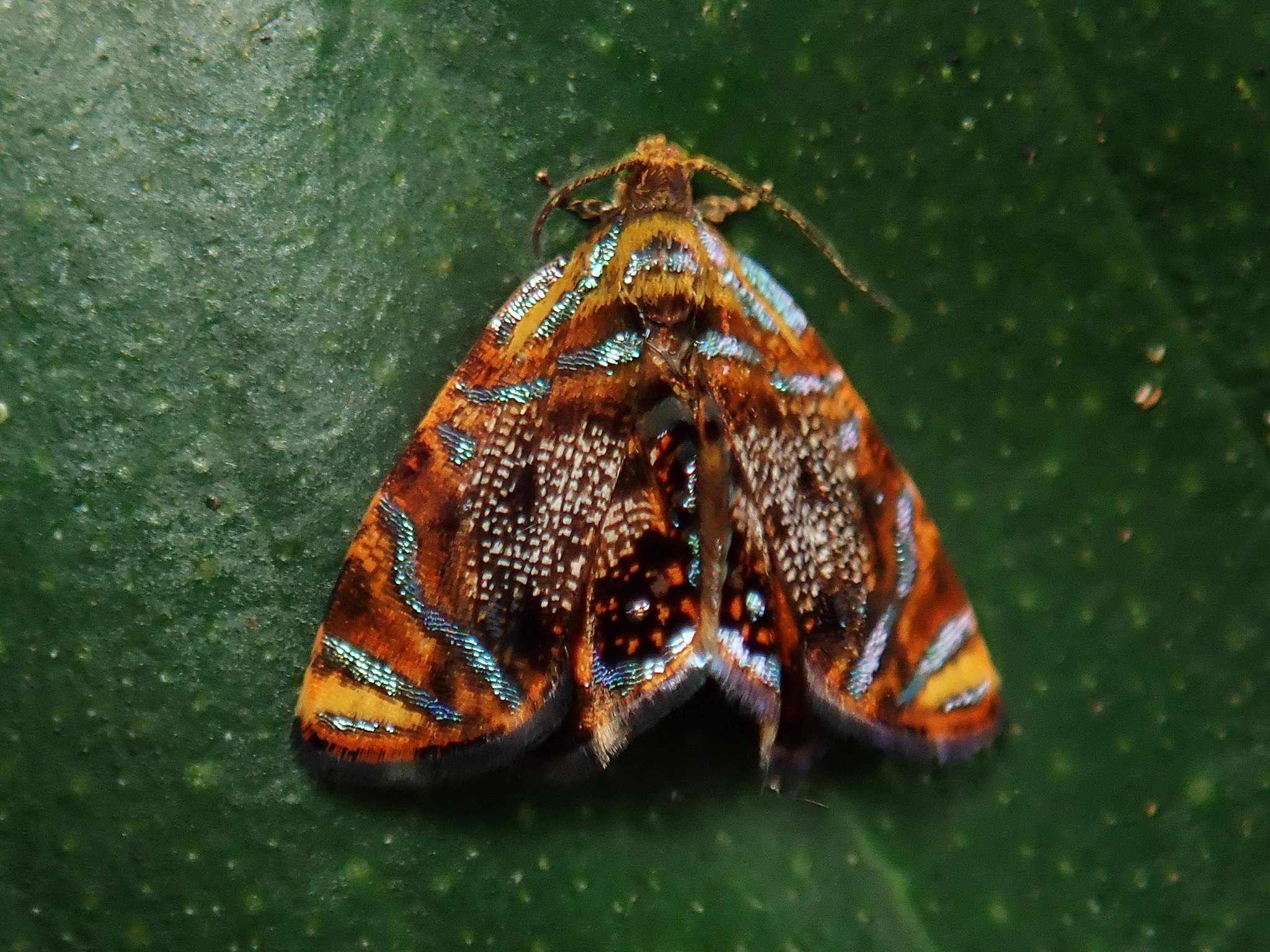

Scientific classification
- Domain: Eukaryota
- Kingdom: Animalia
- Phylum: Arthropoda
- Class: Insecta
- Order: Lepidoptera
- Family: Tortricidae
- Genus: Mictopsichia
- Species: M. mincae

Binomial name
- Mictopsichia mincae Razowski, 2009

= Mictopsichia mincae =

Species of moth

Mictopsichia mincae is a species of moth of the family Tortricidae. It is found in Mexico and Colombia.

The wingspan is about 12 mm.

== Etymology ==
The name refers to the type locality, Minca, Colombia.
