= Mictopsichia miocentra =

Scientific classification
- Kingdom: Animalia
- Phylum: Arthropoda
- Class: Insecta
- Order: Lepidoptera
- Family: Tortricidae
- Genus: Mictopsichia
- Species: M. miocentra

Binomial name
- Mictopsichia miocentra Meyrick, 1920

Species of moth

Mictopsichia miocentra is a species of moth of the family Tortricidae. It is found in Brazil.
