= Mictopsichia gemmisparsana =

Scientific classification
- Kingdom: Animalia
- Phylum: Arthropoda
- Class: Insecta
- Order: Lepidoptera
- Family: Tortricidae
- Genus: Mictopsichia
- Species: M. gemmisparsana

Binomial name
- Mictopsichia gemmisparsana (Walker, 1863)

Synonyms
- Gauris gemmisparsana Walker, 1863

Species of moth

Mictopsichia gemmisparsana is a species of moth of the family Tortricidae. It is found in Brazil.
