= Mictopsichia janeae =

Scientific classification
- Kingdom: Animalia
- Phylum: Arthropoda
- Class: Insecta
- Order: Lepidoptera
- Family: Tortricidae
- Genus: Mictopsichia
- Species: M. janeae

Binomial name
- Mictopsichia janeae Razowski & Pelz, 2010

Species of moth

Mictopsichia janeae is a species of moth of the family Tortricidae. It is found in Ecuador.

The wingspan is 13–14 mm.

== Etymology ==
The species is named in honour of Dr. Jane Lyons.
