= Mictopsichia renaudalis =

Scientific classification
- Domain: Eukaryota
- Kingdom: Animalia
- Phylum: Arthropoda
- Class: Insecta
- Order: Lepidoptera
- Family: Tortricidae
- Genus: Mictopsichia
- Species: M. renaudalis

Binomial name
- Mictopsichia renaudalis (Stoll, in Cramer, 1791)

Synonyms
- Phalaena renaudalis Stoll, in Cramer, 1791; Mictopsichia renandalis Powell, Razowski & Brown, in Heppner, 1995; Mictopsichia renaudana Hubner, [1825]

Species of moth

Mictopsichia renaudalis is a species of moth of the family Tortricidae. It is found in Suriname.
