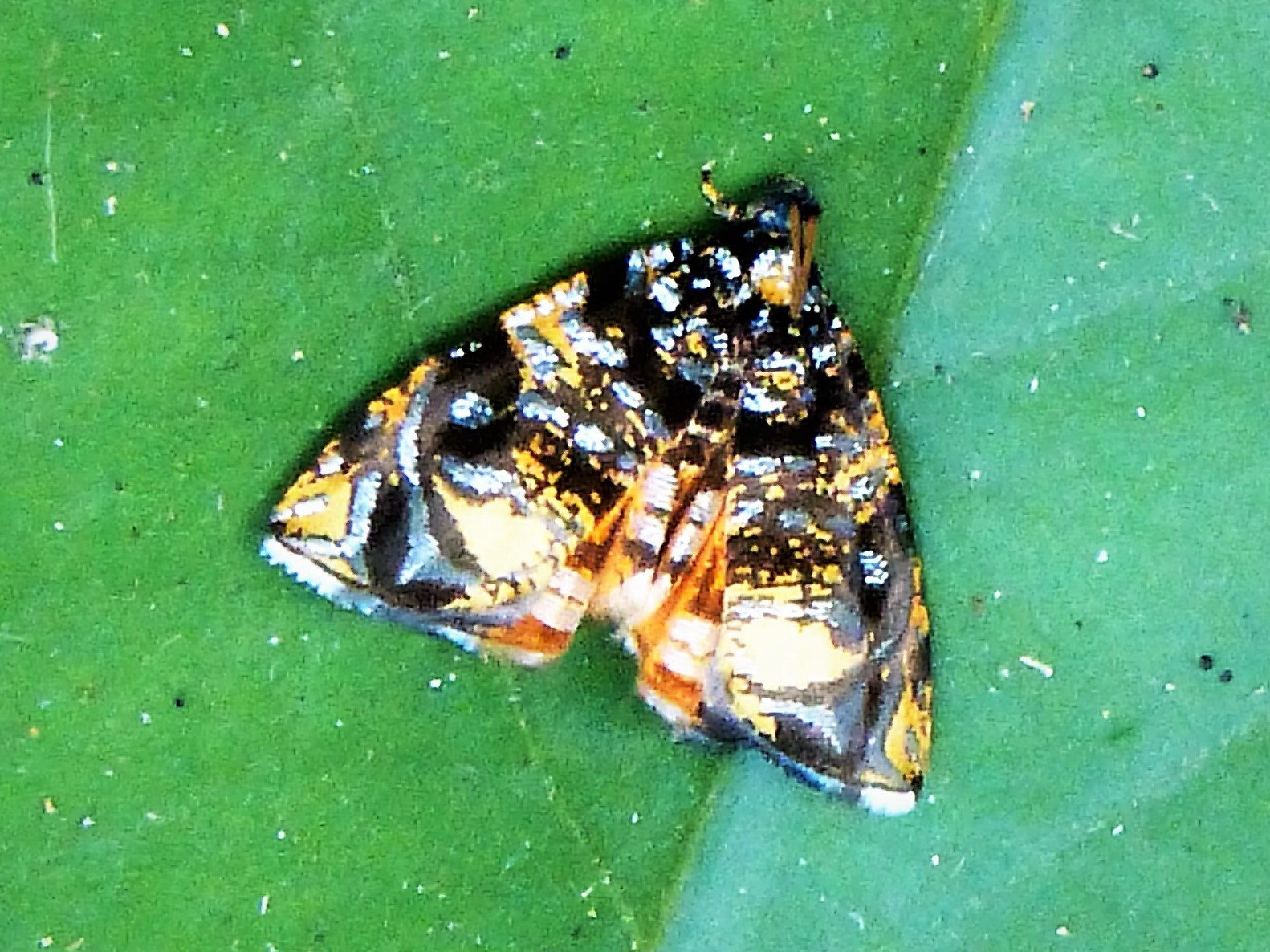

Scientific classification
- Domain: Eukaryota
- Kingdom: Animalia
- Phylum: Arthropoda
- Class: Insecta
- Order: Lepidoptera
- Family: Tortricidae
- Genus: Mictopsichia
- Species: M. hubneriana

Binomial name
- Mictopsichia hubneriana (Stoll, in Cramer, 1791)

Synonyms
- Phalaena (Tortrix) hubneriana Stoll, in Cramer, 1791; Mictopsichia hubnerana Hubner, [1825]

= Mictopsichia hubneriana =

Species of moth

Mictopsichia hubneriana is a species of moth of the family Tortricidae. It is found in Brazil, Bolivia and Guyana.

Adults vary greatly in size, some specimens have a 2–3 mm smaller wingspan than others.
