= Comecayo =

Town in Santa Ana, El Salvador

Coordinates: 14°00′N 89°36′W

Comecayo is a Salvadoran town located in the municipality of Santa Ana, El Salvador.

== Division ==
Comecayo is divided into 10 suburbs:

- Comecayo
- Los Aparejos
- Cruz Verde
- Puerto Rico
- Colonia Áviles
- Las Violetas
- El Jurón
- Colonia Méndez
- Colonia Bolaños
- El Sitio

== Education ==
Its educational institutions include:

- Complejo Educativo "Manuel Monedero"
- Liceo Cristiano Reverendo Juan Bueno del Cantón Comecayo
