= Mictopsichia jamaicana =

Scientific classification
- Domain: Eukaryota
- Kingdom: Animalia
- Phylum: Arthropoda
- Class: Insecta
- Order: Lepidoptera
- Family: Tortricidae
- Genus: Mictopsichia
- Species: M. jamaicana

Binomial name
- Mictopsichia jamaicana Razowski, 2009

Species of moth

Mictopsichia jamaicana is a species of moth of the family Tortricidae. It is found in Jamaica.

The wingspan is about 14.5 mm.

== Etymology ==
The name refers to the country of origin, Jamaica.
