= José Toribio Merino =

Chilean politician and admiral

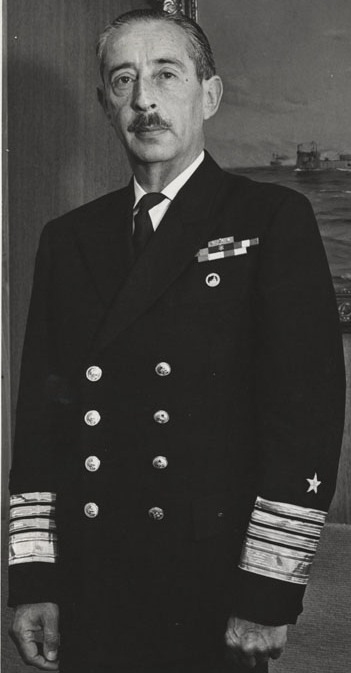

Commander-in-Chief of the Chilean Navy
- In office September 11, 1973 – March 8, 1990
- Preceded by: Raúl Montero Cornejo
- Succeeded by: Jorge Martínez Busch

President of the Government Junta of Chile
- In office March 11, 1981 – March 8, 1990
- Preceded by: Augusto Pinochet
- Succeeded by: Jorge Martínez Busch

Personal details
- Born: 14 December 1915 La Serena, Chile
- Died: 30 August 1996 (aged 80) Viña del Mar, Chile
- Party: Independent
- Spouse: Margarita Riofrío
- Children: 3
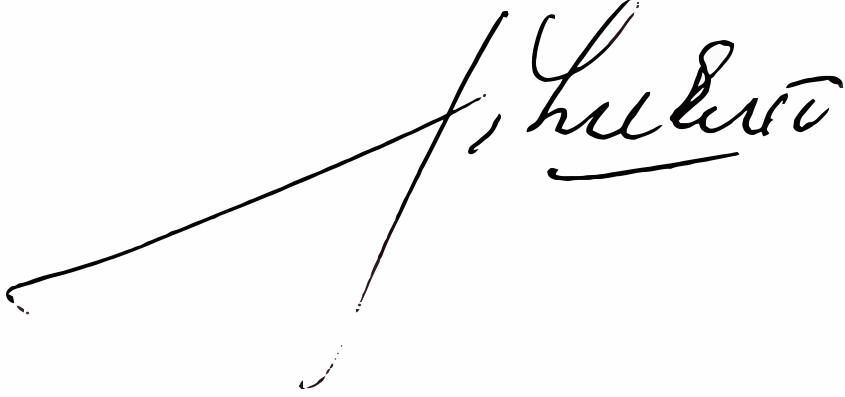
- Signature

Military service
- Allegiance: Chile
- Branch/service: Chilean Navy
- Years of service: 1936–1990
- Rank: Vice Admiral
- Battles/wars: World War II: Battle of Guadalcanal * No proof of participation. See below reference 7 below.; Battle of Leyte Gulf * No proof of participation. See below reference 7.

José Toribio Merino Castro (December 14, 1915 – August 30, 1996) was an admiral of the Chilean Navy who was one of the principal leaders of the 1973 Chilean coup d'état, along with General Augusto Pinochet of the Army, General Gustavo Leigh of the Air Force, and General César Mendoza of the Carabineros (national police). Together they established a military dictatorship that ruled Chile from 1973 until 1990, during which more than 3,197 Chilean citizens were executed or simply "disappeared", according to the reports of official bi-partisan commissions established by the President of Chile, Patricio Aylwin, in the 1990s. In addition, a further 28,459 Chileans were victims of torture, which included approximately 3,400 cases of sexual abuse of women.

Merino, as head of the Navy, was a member of the Military Government Junta from the day of the coup until his retirement on March 8, 1990, just a few days before the beginning of civilian rule. Under his leadership in the days immediately following the coup, the Chilean Navy was responsible for human rights violations including death in detention, disappearance and torture, practices that were only publicly acknowledged by the institution in 2004, more than eight years after Merino's death.

In 2021, the Chilean Navy refused to remove a statue of Merino from the gardens of the Maritime Museum of Valparaíso. The statue's removal had been sought by the Chilean Foundation for Historic Memory. The President of the Foundation, Luis Mariano Rendón, described Merino as an integral part of the military junta which implemented a systematic policy of human rights violations.

== Early life and naval career ==
Born in La Serena, he was son of Vice-Admiral José Toribio Merino Saavedra, Navy Inspector General, and of Bertina Castro Varela. He entered the Naval Academy in 1931, graduating in 1936 as a midshipman. According to his memoirs, during World War II he would have served in the US Navy on the USS Raleigh until 1945. He served in different units of the Chilean Navy, such as the ships Latorre (1943) and Serrano (1945). Later on, he served in Destructor Serrano (2do), Crucero O'Higgins (4to) (CL02), Corbeta Papudo(1º), Transporte Angamos (3ro).

Between 1955 and 1957 he served as aide and counsel in weaponry to the Chilean embassy in London, during the construction of the Almirante-class destroyers Williams and Riveros. In 1960, he was assigned as a professor at the Naval War Academy (AGN) teaching logistics, Geopolitics, Geostrategy. In 1969 he became Naval Director of Weapons. In January 1970 he was appointed as Director of Navy Services, and in November of the same year, he assumed the command of the Chilean main combat fleet (CJE).

== Military dictatorship ==
On September 9, 1973, Merino sent a letter to Generals Augusto Pinochet and Gustavo Leigh, both Commanders-in-Chief of the Army and Air Force respectively, in which he set the day of the coup for September 11. Both Generals agreed, signing the letter with two "According". On the day of the coup, he removed the 'constitutionalist' Commander-in-Chief, Raúl Montero, designating himself as new Head of the Navy. Following the uprising, he became an integral member of the Military Government Junta.

During the military dictatorship that ruled Chile from 1973 until 1990, more than 2,100 Chilean citizens were executed or simply "disappeared", according to the 1991 Report of the Rettig Commission established by President Patricio Aylwin. In 1996, the National Reparation and Reconciliation Corporation added an additional 776 cases of people who were executed by the regime, with another 123 disappearances. As a result, the combined findings of the two commissions officially documented 3,197 cases of victims of “disappearances”, extrajudicial executions and deaths resulting from torture. The figure does not include the victims of torture who survived their ordeal.

The reports of the Rettig Commission and National Corporation for Reparation and Reconciliation were only allowed to focus on crimes resulting in death or disappearance. As a result, in 2003 President Ricardo Lagos promulgated the establishment of the National Commission on Political Imprisonment and Torture, known as the Valech Commission. It issued reports in 2004 and 2005 identifying 28,459 victims of torture, including approximately 3,400 cases of sexual abuse of women.

=== Human rights violations by the Chilean Navy under Merino's leadership ===
Under the leadership of Merino, the Chilean Navy was responsible for the death in detention or disappearance of at least eight people in September and October 1973, according to the bi-partisan Rettig Report commissioned by the Chilean Government in 1991. In the days immediately following the coup, the Chilean naval training ship "Esmeralda" was used as a detention center for political prisoners in the port of Valparaiso, along with the vessels "Maipo" and "Lebu", in addition to the El Belloto naval air base and the Naval War Academy (in particular one of its facilities, the Silva Palma garrison).

According to the 2004 Valech Report (officially The National Commission on Political Imprisonment and Torture Report) commissioned by President Ricardo Lagos, interrogations on the Esmeralda included ill-treatment and torture. One of the former prisoners on the Esmeralda, Antonio Leal Labrín, stated that the torture included the use of electric prods, high-voltage electric charges applied to the testicles, hanging by the feet and dumping in a bucket of water or excrement.

The Rettig Report lists the following people to have died or disappeared while in the custody of the Chilean Navy in late 1973:

- Jaime Vargas (aged 30), a journalist, Socialist Party activist and alderman for Limache, who was held on board the vessel "Maipo" in September 1973. The Rettig Report concluded he had died in the custody of the navy even though his arrest was never acknowledged. In 2011, the Supreme Court of Chile found six former naval officers guilty of the abduction and murder of Vargas.
- Juantok Guzman (aged 26), president of the student centre at the University of Chile architecture department, disappeared while in the custody of the Chilean Navy after being held in detention on board 'Maipo" in September 1973.
- Oscar Farías (aged 33), a Socialist Party activist and government representative in the Parma brewery, was executed in September 1973 while detained at the El Belloto naval airbase.
- Luis Sanguinetti (aged 38) a university professor who was active in the Socialist Party, died as a result of torture on the "Maipo" in September 1973.
- Father Michael Woodward (aged 42), a Catholic priest, died at the naval hospital in Valparaíso in September 1973 after having been tortured on board Esmeralda. Woodward's murder was the subject of the 2002 book "Blood on the Esmeralda: The Life and Death of Father Michael Woodward" by Edward Crouzet. In 2013, two former naval officers were found guilty of Woodward's kidnapping and sentenced to three years in prison. They were charged with kidnapping rather than murder, in order to get around the 1978 Amnesty Decree Law which handed impunity to those who committed human rights violations during the first five years of the dictatorship. Kidnapping is considered a continuous crime that is still being committed today and so is not covered by the amnesty laws. Following the verdict, Woodward's sister Patricia Bennett commented "We regret that Michael's body, hidden by the Chilean Navy, has still not been found. The two retired officers who have been convicted were not the ones in charge – the real culprits, those who gave the orders to torture and murder Michael, have not been prosecuted. The whole thing is a farce." In reacting to the verdict, the then British Ambassador to Chile Jon Benjamin described the treatment that Father Woodward received as 'brutal, cruel, illegal and indefensible' and 'a very serious crime against humanity'.
- Héctor Arellano (aged 19), was killed by a naval patrol in October 1973.
- Félix Figueras (aged 30) was detained at the Naval War Academy in December 1973 and later died at the naval hospital as a result of torture.

Following the release of the Valech Report in 2004, the Chilean Navy publicly admitted to the use of torture on the Esmeralda and issued a formal apology, after decades of denial and eight years after the death of Admiral Merino, the institution's leader during the dictatorship.

Merino referred to communists as 'humanoids'. The English translation of his quote is as follows: "There are two types of human beings. One I call humans, the other, humanoids. The humanoids belong to the Communist Party."

=== Economic policy ===
As the second in command and also as a member of the Governing Junta he was in charge of the economic sector of the country and presided over the Economic Committee of the Council of Ministers, where the economic measures were born. In addition, all the decrees were elaborated and the laws on the matters had to dictate to regulate the economic sector.

From the Economic Committee of the Council of Ministers, he impelled, the first economic measures of the Military Government, the liberation of prices of goods and services; the fiscal cost was reduced and the interest rates were freed to give birth to capital markets; the companies of the State were reorganized as well, standardizing them.

By the end of 1974, he represented the Government and the State of Chile before the Spanish Government, to renegotiate contracts that appeared unfavourable to Chile. Especially, the Pegaso contract was renegotiated, successfully. The study of the Statute for foreign investors was the initiative of Admiral Merino. He impelled the study and the decree-law of exporter promotion of Chile, which gave origin to PROCHILE. In 1975 he participated in the Statute of the Governing Junta, the Legislative Commissions and the Secretariat of Legislation were created.

Admiral Merino presided over the First Legislative Commission after a law established the organization of the junta was enacted in 1974 which made the ruling junta the legislative power of the country and vested formally Pinochet the executive power as the self-proclaimed new President of Chile. Under Merino's leadership, the junta as the Legislative Commission first legislated mainly for the economic sectors and of Foreign Relations, and soon, the Fourth Legislative Commission of the junta enacted laws for the Defense Sector. In this period they fostered the Decree-Law to discontinue the forestation, settling down incentives to develop the monoculture plantations across the country. Again it represented the Government of Chile before the United States Government and one met with President Jimmy Carter. They Decree-Law N 3480, which allowed the indebted of the Association of Savings and Mortgages to re-pact their debts, which came to the favour of workers of the middle-class sector.

During the conflict with Argentina over the Beagle Channel, Merino was one of the most belligerent junta members. He only reluctantly accepted Pope John Paul II's peace proposal, telling him, "I only signed the treaty because I'm Catholic and I respect Your Holiness. If I weren't, I wouldn't have signed it." Also, he ordered the commander of the surface fleet to "go there... and win the war".

In 1980 law N 3,500 was dictated to the decree that created the new provisional system. Admiral Merino was a great defender of this legislation, giving his approval and endorsement during the study and discussion of this matter. He was the main legislative person in charge of the materialization. When in 1980 the new constitution was approved, Admiral Merino presided over the Governing Junta. This constituted the legislative power legitimized by the constitution and remained in effect until March 1990, when democratic government was restored. In addition, the admiral presided over the fifth Legislative Commission of the junta.

In 1982 the country was affected by the worldwide recession and the Government had to take economic measures to palliate the crisis that developed. Admiral Merino, from the Legislative Power, impelled laws on the modernization of the financial sector, the guarantee of the State to the deposits and savings, lowering of the tariffs to the imports and in general, the normalization of the sectors more affected by the crisis, giving the maximum support to the Executive authority, which was allowed to remove to the country from the crisis.

During this period he impelled the initiative of the Law of promotion to the Merchant Marine, remarkably contributing to the growth of this sector and also to the sector of shipyards and naval industry through the Law N 18.454. He presented the relative motions to replace the Code of Commerce; to adapt the Chilean marine limits to the Convention of Jamaica, by means of the corresponding reform to the Civil Code, and to countermand the legislation that allowed the therapeutic abortion, everything which was approved by means of the corresponding laws dictated in that period.

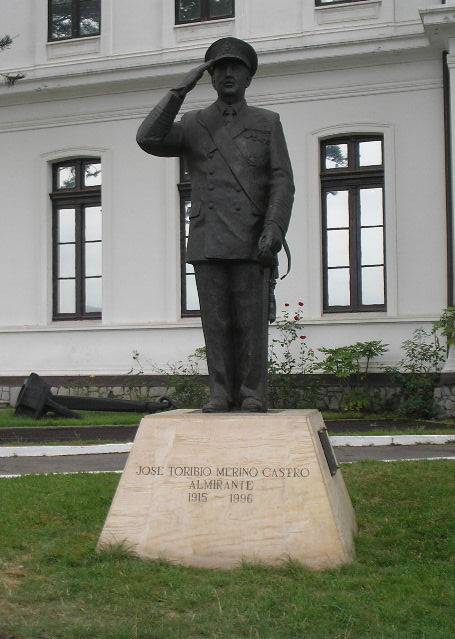
The statue of Admiral José Toribio Merino in Valparaíso's Naval Museum

Also, he impelled all the Constitutional Statutory laws, which allowed the Military Government to fulfil the constitutional itinerary and delivery the power to the city elected authority. In 1989 he proposed to the Executive authority the law of Fishing and Agriculture, which was obtained after a great discussion in the sector. Its aim was to put the conditions for the conservation of renewable marine resources.

Finally, it corresponded to him to preside over the Joint Legislative Commission destined to reform the Political Constitution, whose text, approved by the Governing Junta, was ratified by the conducted plebiscite on the 30 of June 1989. During the period of government of the FF.AA., under his tuition 3,660 Decrees were promulgated Laws and 1,090 Laws that take his signature. But Pinochet as the president of the country has the final authority to ratify and implement such laws passed by the junta and approved by Merino. He retired from the navy as its commander in chief on the 8 of March 1990, after more than 50 years of service. He was also the President of the Government Junta of Chile, the de facto vice-president of the country from March 11, 1981, until his resignation on March 8, 1990.

=== Martes de Merino ===
During the dictatorship, Merino held short improvised press conferences on Tuesdays that came to be called martes de Merino (Merino's Tuesdays). These conferences gained notoriety for Merino's recurrent use of dark humor in addition to his "constant errors and aberrations". In one conference, Merino refused to describe communists as humans. In another occasion Merino called Bolivians "metamorphosed camelids" (Spanish: auquénidos metamórfoseados).

=== 1988 plebiscite ===
On the night of the 1988 plebiscite which resulted in the victory of democratic camp and ended Pinochet's rule, Merino, with Air Force Chief Fernando Matthei and Carabineros de Chile chief Rodolfo Stange pushed back against Pinochet's plans to overturn the result of the vote and extend his rule, thus allowing the Chilean transition to democracy to take place as planned.

== Later life ==
After his retirement, he stayed out of politics and dedicated himself to his favourite pastime, playing golf. He started to write his memoirs but did not live to see them published. He died of lymphoma in 1996, in Viña del Mar, at the age of 80.

The Chilean Navy in honour of the Admiral named after him the BMS Almirante Merino. This ship is the main surface logistic platform for the submarine force.

== See also ==
- Patricio Carvajal
- Ismael Huerta
- Chilean ship José Toribio Merino Castro

Political offices
Preceded by None	Member of Government Junta; 1973–1990	Succeeded by Jorge Martínez Busch
Preceded by Augusto Pinochet	President of Government Junta; 1981–1990	Succeeded by Jorge Martínez Busch
Military offices
Preceded by Raul Montero	Commander-in-Chief of the Chilean Navy; 1973–1990	Succeeded by Jorge Martínez Busch
