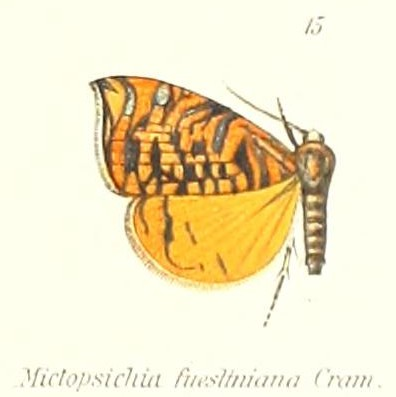
- Rubropsichia fuesliniana

Scientific classification
- Kingdom: Animalia
- Phylum: Arthropoda
- Class: Insecta
- Order: Lepidoptera
- Family: Tortricidae
- Tribe: Archipini
- Genus: Rubropsichia; Razowski, 2009

= Rubropsichia =

Genus of moths

Rubropsichia is a genus of moths belonging to the family Tortricidae.

== Species ==
- Rubropsichia brasiliana Razowski, 2009
- Rubropsichia fuesliniana (Stoll, in Cramer, 1781)
- Rubropsichia kartaboana Razowski, 2011
- Rubropsichia santaremana Razowski, 2009

== See also ==
- List of Tortricidae genera
