= Rubropsichia brasiliana =

Scientific classification
- Domain: Eukaryota
- Kingdom: Animalia
- Phylum: Arthropoda
- Class: Insecta
- Order: Lepidoptera
- Family: Tortricidae
- Genus: Rubropsichia
- Species: R. brasiliana

Binomial name
- Rubropsichia brasiliana Razowski, 2009

Species of moth

Rubropsichia brasiliana is a species of moth of the family Tortricidae. It is found in Brazil.

The wingspan is about 20 mm.
