= Benavidez =

Benavidez is a surname. Notable people with the surname include:

== People ==
- Exequiel Benavídez (born 1989), Argentine professional footballer
- David Benavidez (born 1996), American professional boxer in the Super middleweight division
- Gastón Benavídez (born 1995), Argentine professional footballer
- Jesse Benavides (born 1963), American former professional boxer
- José Benavidez (born 1992), Mexican-American professional boxer in the Light Welterweight division
- Joseph Benavidez (born 1984), American mixed martial artist
- Nazario Benavídez (1802–1858) Argentine soldier and Governor of San Juan Province
- Nicolás Benavídez (born 1992), Argentine professional footballer
- Roy Benavidez (1935–1998), US Army Special Forces soldier and Medal of Honor awardee
- Teddy Benavidez, pre World War II Filipino actor who made his film debut in 1936
- Tom Benavidez (1939–2016), American politician

== Fictional characters ==
- Maria Benavidez, fictional character in The Whispers

== Places ==
- Benavídez, Buenos Aires, in Argentina.

== See also ==
- Benavídez rail disaster, February 1, 1970, Argentina (at least 142 dead and 368 injured)
- USNS Benavidez (T-AKR-306), Bob Hope-class roll on roll off vehicle cargo ship of the United States Navy
- Banavie
- Benavides (disambiguation)
