= Jorge Martínez Busch =

Chilean admiral (1936–2011)

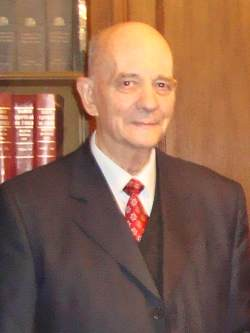

Designated member of the Senate of Chile
- In office 11 March 1998 – 11 March 2006

Commanders-in-chief of the Chilean Navy
- In office 9 March 1990 – 14 November 1997
- Preceded by: José Toribio Merino
- Succeeded by: Jorge Arancibia

President of the Government Junta of Chile
- In office 8 March 1990 – 11 March 1990
- Preceded by: José Toribio Merino
- Succeeded by: Office abolished Gabriel Valdés as President of the Senate; José Antonio Viera-Gallo as President of the Chamber of Deputies

Personal details
- Born: 13 September 1936 San Bernardo, Chile
- Died: 14 November 2011 (aged 75) Vina del Mar, Chile
- Spouse: Carmen García Drummond
- Children: Three
- Parent(s): Héctor Martínez; Hilda Busch
- Education: Arturo Prat Naval Academy (BA); Pontifical Catholic University of Valparaíso (MA)
- Occupation: Politician
- Profession: Sailor
- Military career
- Allegiance: Chile
- Branch: Chilean Navy
- Rank: Admiral
- Commands: Commander in Chief of the Chilean Navy

Jorge Martínez Busch (13 September 1936 – 14 October 2011) was a Chilean Navy admiral and politician. He served as the Commander-in-Chief (1990 - 1997), being designated in the last days of the military regime, hence assuming as Member (and President) of the Military Junta briefly until the return of democracy in March 1990.

He completed a master's degree in global history at the Pontifical Catholic University of Valparaíso. Similarly, he has made many publications in scientific magazines of that institution.

Rear Admiral (r) of the Chilean Navy, General Staff Officer and Weapons Engineer, university professor, he served as a Designated Senator between 1998 and 2006, in his capacity as former Commander-in-Chief of the Navy, he was Naval Attaché at the Embassy of Chile in Ecuador and Chief of Staff of the Navy to the Military Government Junta in 1987. He was awarded an Honorary Doctorate (Doctor Honoris Causa) by the World Maritime University.

== Biography ==
=== Family and youth ===
He was born in San Bernardo, Chile, on 13 September 1936. He was the son of Army Major General Héctor Martínez Amaro and Hilda Busch Portales.

He married Carmen García Drummond, with whom he had three children.

=== Professional career ===
He completed his secondary education at the Instituto Zambrano of the Congregation of the Brothers of the Christian Schools in Santiago. On 6 February 1951, he entered the Arturo Prat Naval Academy, graduating as a Midshipman on 1 January 1957.

Within the Navy, he completed, among others, specialization courses in Torpedoes and Submarine Weapons and General Staff. Abroad, he undertook courses in the United States and Sweden. He obtained the professional titles of General Staff Officer and Weapons Engineer, with specialization in Torpedoes, Anti-Submarine Weapons, and Mine Warfare. He also completed a master's degree in Naval and Maritime Sciences with a specialization in Strategy and obtained a bachelor's degree in Naval and Maritime Sciences. In the academic field, he earned the qualification of Military School Professor in Anti-Submarine Warfare and Academy Professor in Logistics.

In his professional activity, he served as Professor of Logistics and National Security at the Naval War Academy and as Professor of Naval Warfare at the War Academies of the Chilean Army and the Chilean Air Force. He also taught outside institutional settings, serving as Professor of Geopolitics at the Federico Santa María Technical University and as research professor at the Institute of Political Science of the University of Chile.

During his naval career, he held assignments in various departments and units of the Navy, and commanded the barge Bolados, the torpedo boat Guacolda, the submarine chaser Papudo, the destroyer Ministro Portales, and the destroyer Almirante Riveros.

In April 1991, he participated in the sessions organized by the International Relations Service of the University of Salamanca, Spain, on “The Armed Forces in Ibero-America in the New International Situation,” presenting the topic “The Paris Charter for Military Relations between Ibero-America and Europe.”

In October 1991, he took part in the “Naval Power Symposium” held in Newport, Rhode Island, United States.

In August 1993, he carried out a professional visit to Malaysia, invited by that country's Commander-in-Chief. There, he participated in a conference organized by the Institute of International and Strategic Studies (ISIS) on “The Pacific Basin: its Economic and Strategic Importance in the Next Century. A Chilean Perspective.”

In March 1994, he participated in the XVII Inter-American Naval Conference held in Uruguay, where he presented on “The Mission Areas of Navies in a Future Scenario.”

In March 1996, he delivered the lecture “The Presential Sea: Origin, Concept and Importance. The New York Agreement of August 1995” at the World Maritime University in Malmö, Sweden.

On 14 November 1997, he retired voluntarily from the Navy.

He later served as Director of the Institute of Pacific and Indian Ocean Studies at the Gabriela Mistral University.

== Public career ==
He served as Naval Attaché at the Embassy of Chile in Ecuador, Chief of Staff of the Fleet, and Commodore of the Inter-American Naval Operation UNITAS XXV in 1984.

He also served as Director of Training of the Navy, Chief of Staff of the Navy to the Military Junta in 1987, Commander-in-Chief of the Fleet, Director General of Personnel, and Judge of the Naval Court Martial.

In March 1990, he assumed office as Commander-in-Chief of the Chilean Navy, a position he held until 14 November 1997.

=== Honors ===
In August 1990, he received the Geopolitical Merit Award from the Geopolitical Institute of Chile.

In March 1992, he was honored by the University of the Pacific in Santiago as “Distinguished Personality of the Year 1991.” In January 1995, he was named “Personality of the Year 1994” by the newspaper La Estrella of Valparaíso.

In October 1997, the Chilean Maritime University named him “Professor Honoris Causa,” in recognition of his academic merits, research, and contribution to the study and development of national maritime interests.

Among the principal medals and decorations he received are multiple grades of the Military Star of the Armed Forces of Chile, the Distinguished Services decoration of the Armed Forces of Chile, the Order of Merit of the Armed Forces of Ecuador, the Order of the President of the Republic of Chile, the Order of Merit of the Navy of Brazil, the Order of May for Naval Merit of Argentina, naval merit decorations from Uruguay, Spain, Colombia, Venezuela, and the United States, including the Legion of Merit in the rank of Commander.

== Academic contribution ==
Martínez Busch developed the concept of oceanopolitics as a strategic framework parallel to Geopolitics that places the ocean as one of the cores of state decision-making, rather than treating it merely as a mere route of transit, a peripheral frontier, or a secondary extension of terrestrial geopolitics. His approach emphasized the need to incorporate the "existence and presence of the sea" into political decisions and to understand maritime space as a domain for the development, projection, and long-term interests of the state. In this sense, oceanopolitics involves recognizing the influence of the sea on the state's vital cycle and integrating maritime interests, capabilities, resources, and strategic opportunities into national planning.

The concept was subsequently incorporated into regional debates on the sea under a distinct Latin American approach, particularly within the strategic and naval thinking of countries such as Chile, Brazil, Peru, and Ecuador.

The study of oceanopolitics has provided a framework for examining issues related to defense, security, development, and environmental policy. In some countries of South America, particularly Chile and Ecuador, the concept has been incorporated into governmental and naval strategic planning and decision-making.

=== Complementary activities ===
In addition to delivering lectures and master classes, he devoted himself to writing articles on strategy, national security, geopolitics, naval history, and world history. He specialized in the analysis of political-military thought throughout history and published several books.

In March 1993, at the Naval Club of Valparaíso, he presented his book Oceanopolítica: una alternativa para el desarrollo.

In December 1993, with the sponsorship of the Chilean Maritime University, he presented his book La influencia de Fray Francisco de Vitoria en Chile, 1550–1650 at the Naval Alumni Center “Caleuche” in Valparaíso.

In March 1994, he was appointed president of the Academy of Naval and Maritime History of Chile.

Between 2006 and 2010, he served as a columnist for Diario Financiero.
