= Mictopsichia panamae =

Scientific classification
- Domain: Eukaryota
- Kingdom: Animalia
- Phylum: Arthropoda
- Class: Insecta
- Order: Lepidoptera
- Family: Tortricidae
- Genus: Mictopsichia
- Species: M. panamae

Binomial name
- Mictopsichia panamae Razowski, 2009

Species of moth

Mictopsichia panamae is a species of moth of the family Tortricidae. It is found in Panama.

The wingspan is about 15.5 mm.
