= Jorge Lucar =

Chilean Army general

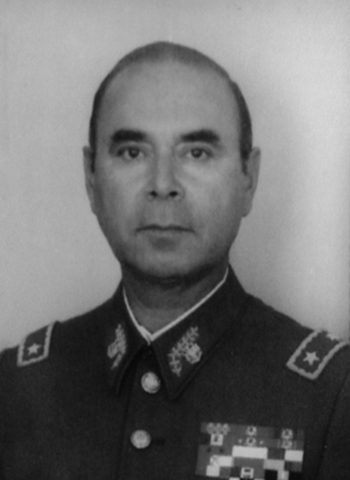
Jorge Lucar Figueroa

Jorge Lucar Figueroa (born 6 January 1934) is a Chilean Army general and member of the Government Junta that ruled Chile from 1973–1990. He served on the junta as a member from 2 January to 11 March 1990. He is the last living Government Junta member after the death of Santiago Sinclair.
