= Chamaepsichia cetonia =

Scientific classification
- Domain: Eukaryota
- Kingdom: Animalia
- Phylum: Arthropoda
- Class: Insecta
- Order: Lepidoptera
- Family: Tortricidae
- Genus: Chamaepsichia
- Species: C. cetonia

Binomial name
- Chamaepsichia cetonia Razowski, 2011

Species of moth

Chamaepsichia cetonia is a species of moth of the family Tortricidae. It is found in Costa Rica.
