= Universidad Autónoma de Santa Ana =

University in Santa Ana, El Salvador

Coordinates: 13.9765°N 89.5887°W

The Universidad Autónoma de Santa Ana is a university in Santa Ana, El Salvador.

== History ==
It was established in 1982.
