= Mictopsichia callicharis =

Scientific classification
- Kingdom: Animalia
- Phylum: Arthropoda
- Class: Insecta
- Order: Lepidoptera
- Family: Tortricidae
- Genus: Mictopsichia
- Species: M. callicharis

Binomial name
- Mictopsichia callicharis Meyrick, 1921

Species of moth

Mictopsichia callicharis is a species of moth of the family Tortricidae. It is found in Brazil.
