= Mictopsichia boliviae =

Scientific classification
- Domain: Eukaryota
- Kingdom: Animalia
- Phylum: Arthropoda
- Class: Insecta
- Order: Lepidoptera
- Family: Tortricidae
- Genus: Mictopsichia
- Species: M. boliviae

Binomial name
- Mictopsichia boliviae Razowski, 2009

Species of moth

Mictopsichia boliviae is a species of moth of the family Tortricidae. It is found in Bolivia.

The wingspan is about 19.5 mm (0.77 in).
