= Mictopsichia misahuallia =

Scientific classification
- Domain: Eukaryota
- Kingdom: Animalia
- Phylum: Arthropoda
- Class: Insecta
- Order: Lepidoptera
- Family: Tortricidae
- Genus: Mictopsichia
- Species: M. misahuallia

Binomial name
- Mictopsichia misahuallia Razowski, 2011

Species of moth

Mictopsichia misahuallia is a species of moth of the family Tortricidae. It is found in Napo Province, Ecuador.
