= Mictopsichia egae =

Scientific classification
- Domain: Eukaryota
- Kingdom: Animalia
- Phylum: Arthropoda
- Class: Insecta
- Order: Lepidoptera
- Family: Tortricidae
- Genus: Mictopsichia
- Species: M. egae

Binomial name
- Mictopsichia egae Razowski, 2009

Species of moth

Mictopsichia egae is a species of moth of the family Tortricidae. It is found in Brazil.

The wingspan is about 16 mm.

== Etymology ==
The name refers to the type locality, Ega, now called Tefé, Amazonas, Brazil.
