= Mictopsichia chlidonata =

Scientific classification
- Domain: Eukaryota
- Kingdom: Animalia
- Phylum: Arthropoda
- Class: Insecta
- Order: Lepidoptera
- Family: Tortricidae
- Genus: Mictopsichia
- Species: M. chlidonata

Binomial name
- Mictopsichia chlidonata Razowski, 2009

Species of moth

Mictopsichia chlidonata is a species of moth of the family Tortricidae. It is found in Peru.

The wingspan is about 11 mm.

== Etymology ==
The name refers to colouration of the species and is derived from Greek chlidon (meaning a decoration).
