= Mictopsichia marowijneae =

Scientific classification
- Domain: Eukaryota
- Kingdom: Animalia
- Phylum: Arthropoda
- Class: Insecta
- Order: Lepidoptera
- Family: Tortricidae
- Genus: Mictopsichia
- Species: M. marowijneae

Binomial name
- Mictopsichia marowijneae Razowski, 2009

Species of moth

Mictopsichia marowijneae is a species of moth of the family Tortricidae. It is found in Suriname and Guyana.

The wingspan is about 13 mm.

== Etymology ==
The name refers to the name of the river at which the species was collected, the Marowijne.
