= Mictopsichia periopta =

Scientific classification
- Kingdom: Animalia
- Phylum: Arthropoda
- Class: Insecta
- Order: Lepidoptera
- Family: Tortricidae
- Genus: Mictopsichia
- Species: M. periopta

Binomial name
- Mictopsichia periopta Meyrick, 1913

Species of moth

Mictopsichia periopta is a species of moth of the family Tortricidae. It is found in Guyana.
