= Rubropsichia santaremana =

Scientific classification
- Domain: Eukaryota
- Kingdom: Animalia
- Phylum: Arthropoda
- Class: Insecta
- Order: Lepidoptera
- Family: Tortricidae
- Genus: Rubropsichia
- Species: R. santaremana

Binomial name
- Rubropsichia santaremana Razowski, 2009

Species of moth

Rubropsichia santaremana is a species of moth of the family Tortricidae. It is found in Brazil.
