= Mictopsichia torresi =

Scientific classification
- Kingdom: Animalia
- Phylum: Arthropoda
- Class: Insecta
- Order: Lepidoptera
- Family: Tortricidae
- Genus: Mictopsichia
- Species: M. torresi

Binomial name
- Mictopsichia torresi Razowski & Pelz, 2010

Species of moth

Mictopsichia torresi is a species of moth of the family Tortricidae. It is found in Ecuador.

The wingspan is about 15 mm.

== Etymology ==
The species is named in honour of Ing. Salazar Torres.
