= Mictopsichia ornatissima =

Scientific classification
- Domain: Eukaryota
- Kingdom: Animalia
- Phylum: Arthropoda
- Class: Insecta
- Order: Lepidoptera
- Family: Tortricidae
- Genus: Mictopsichia
- Species: M. ornatissima

Binomial name
- Mictopsichia ornatissima (Dognin, 1909)

Synonyms
- Gauris ornatissima Dognin, 1909

Species of moth

Mictopsichia ornatissima is a species of moth of the family Tortricidae. It is found in Peru.
