= Mictopsichia shuara =

Scientific classification
- Kingdom: Animalia
- Phylum: Arthropoda
- Class: Insecta
- Order: Lepidoptera
- Family: Tortricidae
- Genus: Mictopsichia
- Species: M. shuara

Binomial name
- Mictopsichia shuara Razowski & Pelz, 2010

Species of moth

Mictopsichia shuara is a species of moth of the family Tortricidae. It is found in Ecuador.

The wingspan is about 17 mm.
