= Mictopsichia cubae =

Scientific classification
- Kingdom: Animalia
- Phylum: Arthropoda
- Clade: Pancrustacea
- Class: Insecta
- Order: Lepidoptera
- Family: Tortricidae
- Genus: Mictopsichia
- Species: M. cubae

Binomial name
- Mictopsichia cubae Razowski, 2009

Species of moth

Mictopsichia cubae is a species of moth of the family Tortricidae. Adults of the species have a forewing length of 5.0–5.5 mm (0.20–0.22 in) and a wingspan of around 12 mm (0.47 in). It is found in Cuba, Hispaniola, Costa Rica, and Honduras. The moth inhabits mesic lowland forest and rainforest from the coast up to 405 m (1,000 ft).

== Taxonomy ==
Mictopsichia cubae was formally described by the Polish entomologist Józef Razowski in 1999 based on a male collected from Santiago de Cuba in Cuba. The species is named after the country in which it is found.

== Description ==
Adults of the species have a forewing length of 5.0–5.5 mm (0.20–0.22 in) and a wingspan of around 12 mm (0.47 in). Mictopsichia cubae is most likely to be confused with M. nyhllinda; the former differs from the latter species in the two slender transverse bands of orange scaling on the dorsal surface of its thorax, as well as the form of the male genitalia.

== Distribution and habitat ==
Mictopsichia cubae is found in Cuba, Hispaniola, Costa Rica, and Honduras. On Cuba and Hispaniola, it found along the coast, while it is known from an elevation of 405 m (1,000 ft) in Costa Rica. It inhabits mesic lowland forest and rainforest. The species is thought to be day-flying.
