= Santa Ana, El Salvador =

Santa Ana Santa Ana
- District
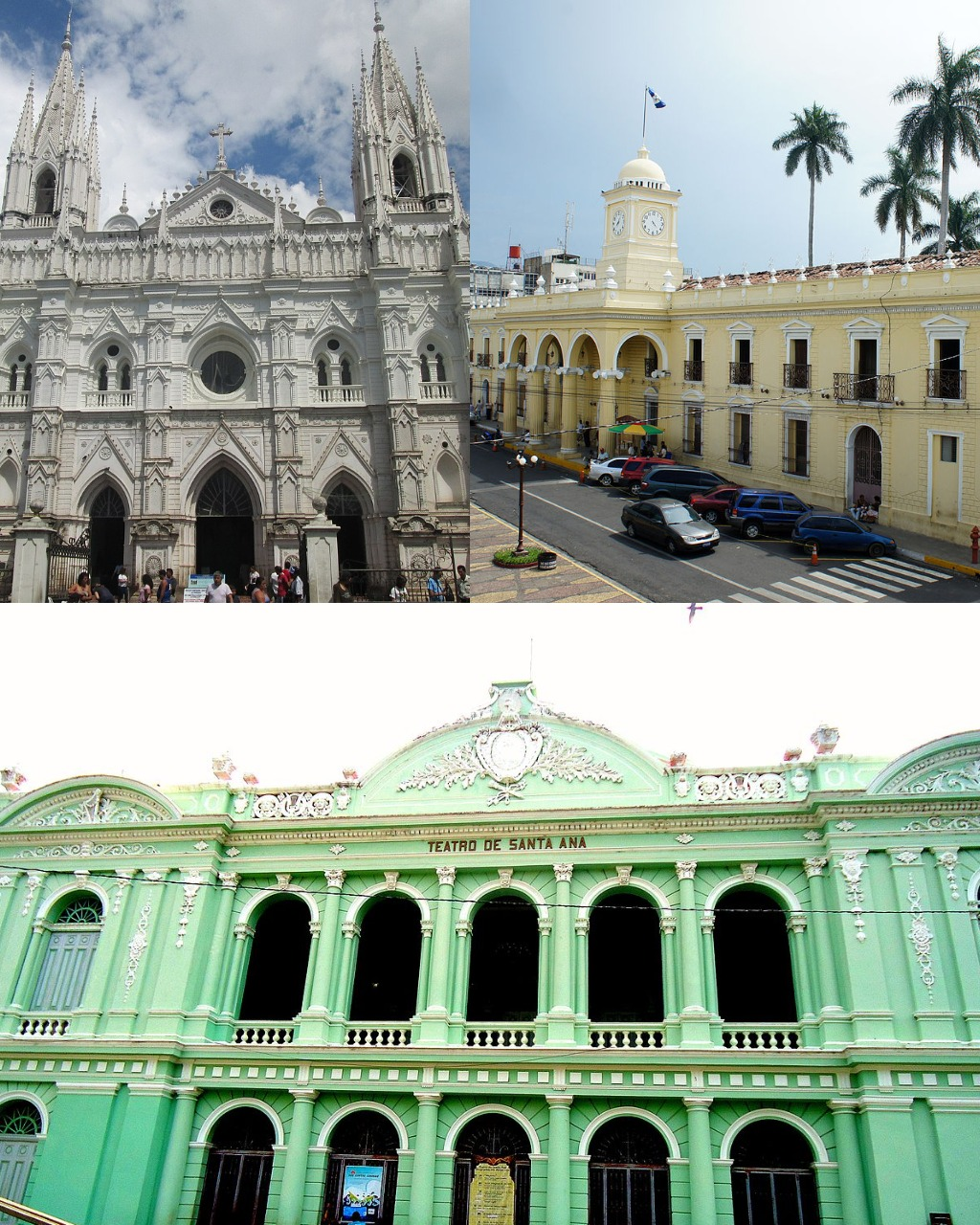
- From top, left to right: Cathedral Nuestra Señora de Santa Ana, Municipal Palace, National Theater of Santa Ana

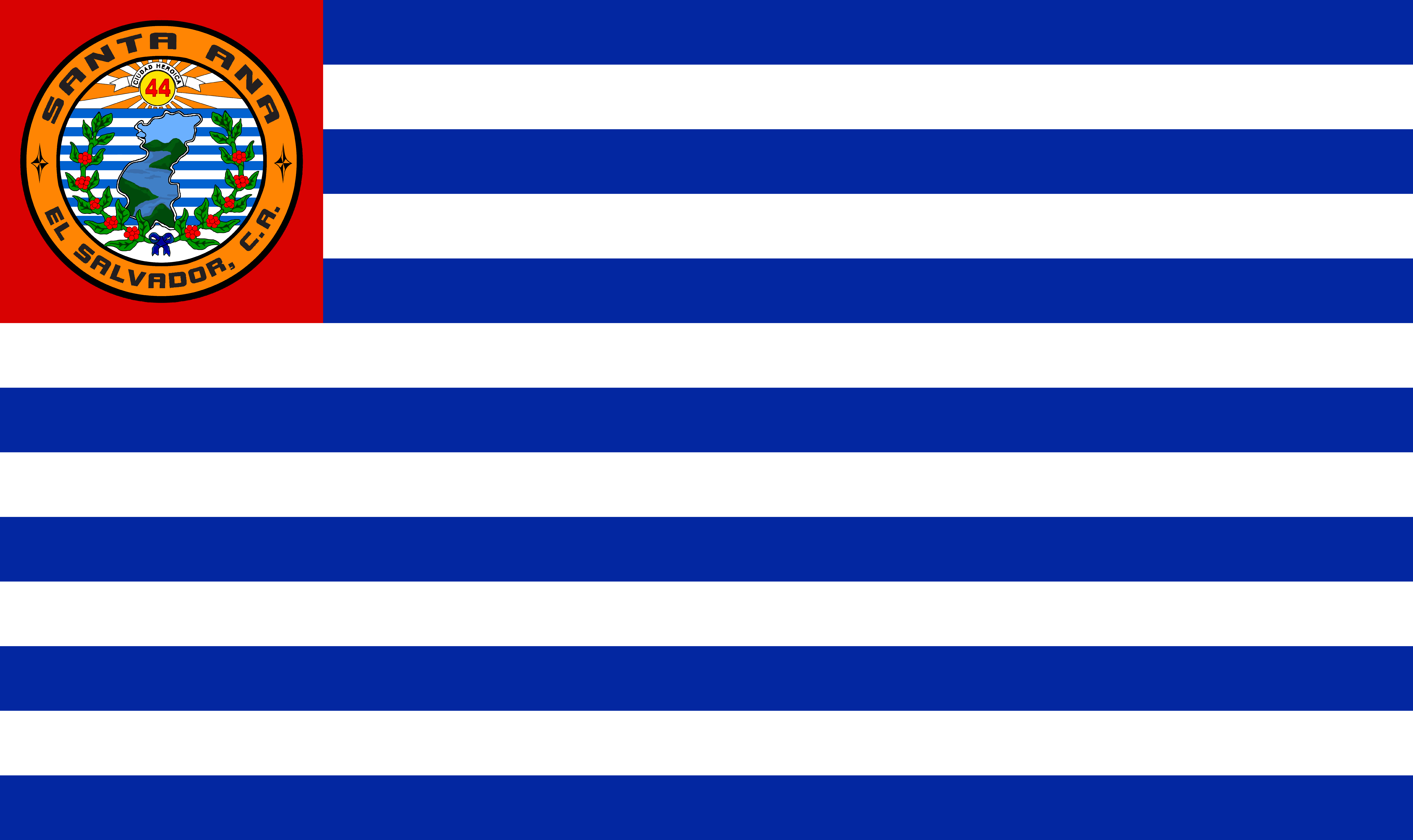
- Flag Coat of arms
- Nickname: La Ciudad Heróica (The Heroic City)
- Motto: Capital del mundo, sucursal del cielo. (Capital of the world, branch office of Heaven.)
- Location within El Salvador
- Coordinates: 13°59′42″N 89°33′22″W
- Country: El Salvador
- Department: Santa Ana
- Founded: 1569

Government
  - Mayor: Gustavo Acevedo

Area
  - Total: 400.01 km^{2} (154.44 sq mi)
- Elevation: 665 m (2,182 ft)

Population (2024)
  - Total: 250,760
  - Rank: 3rd
  - Seat/City: 178,690
- SV-SA: CP 2201
- Website: www.santaana.gob.sv (in Spanish)

Santa Ana (Spanish pronunciation: [ˈsanta ˈana]) is the second largest city in El Salvador, after the capital of San Salvador. It is located 64 kilometers northwest of San Salvador, the capital city. Santa Ana has approximately 250,760 (2024) inhabitants and serves both as the capital of the department of Santa Ana and as the municipal seat for the surrounding municipality of the same name. For its administration the municipality is divided into 35 colonias (neighborhoods) and 318 small villages.

A major processing center for El Salvador's sizable coffee bean industry is located near Santa Ana.

Santa Ana has become a tourist destination, especially for tourists eager to learn about Salvadoran culture and traditions.

Currently, the mayor of Santa Ana is Gustavo Acevedo, from Nuevas Ideas.

== Geography ==
Santa Ana city map: 1. Central Plateau; 2. Youth Volcanic Chain. The blue section is Lake Coatepeque, which forms part of the youth volcanic chain.

The city of Santa Ana is located on a plateau about 665 meters above sea level. The city has year-round warm climate with an average temperature of around 25 °C (77 °F). The main river is the Guajoyo river which is a major tributary of the much larger Lempa River. There is a major Hydroelectric Power station at the Guajoyo river that provides electricity to most of the western sector of the country.

The city is situated among a number of green hills, including Tecana Hill and the Hills of Santa Lucía. In the southern part of the municipality is the Ilamatepec volcano, the highest volcano in the country, which had a moderate eruption in 2005 that killed two people. Close to it is another famous volcano, Izalco, known to sailors throughout the mid-19th century and early 20th century as "The lighthouse of the Pacific" due to its constant eruptions.

=== Surrounding mountains ===
The highest elevation in the town is the Santa Ana volcano (which measures 2365 meters).

=== Physio-graphic regions ===
The relief of the municipality may be divided into three physiographic regions, which are:

The Apaneca Range, which is located in the southern part of town and home to the Santa Ana volcano (which is the highest volcano in the country), the Izalco volcano (which the youngest volcano in the country having originated in 1770), and the Cerro Verde, located in the Natural Park of Cerro Verde (which was re-opened after a closure in 2001, due to earthquakes that occurred earlier that year).

Apaneca from the mountains to the center of town lies a plain or plain, which lies on the plateau where the city is located.

North of the plateau is the mountain range-Comecayo Mita, in which small rise orographic configurations including the Tecan, Pinalito, Pinalón, Santa Lucia and Camones hills.

=== Hydrology ===
Guajoyo River is one of the major rivers in the municipality of Santa Ana

The city and the greater part thereof is located in the Lempa River basin region, while the remaining parts of the municipality are in the basin region of Coatepeque. Within the Lempa River basin region, the city and Most of the municipality is located in the upper Lempa River.

The city is surrounded both above aquifers located in the basement, of which most are moderate vulnerability.

==== Surface waters ====
Within the streams that flow through the territory of the municipality including the City, the main rivers are:

- Lempa River, which forms the border with the municipality of Nueva Concepcion
- Guajoyo River (where a hydroelectric plant is located)
- Suquiapa River, which forms the confluence of the Apanchacal and Zarco rivers bordering the town of Coatepeque.

The southern part of the city is connected with Lake Coatepeque, which has become one of the main attractions of the entire Department of Santa Ana.

In addition, another 15 rivers and 52 minor streams flow through the municipality of Santa Ana. The city is criss-crossed by the El Molino, Apanchacal, and Apanteos rivers.

=== Climate ===
The city and the entire municipality of Santa Ana are located in the tropics and have a tropical savanna climate (according to the Köppen climate classification). The city experiences two distinct seasons, which are: the dry season (November to May) and rainy season (May to November). The municipality of Santa Ana has a mean annual temperature of 24 °C (75 °F) with a temperature around 17 °C (63 °F) and 34 °C (93 °F) minimum and maximum. Although at times the maximum temperatures often exceed 35 °C (95 °F), since it is a city with a very hot climate. It also has an annual relative humidity between 70% and 75%. The city is dominated by winds from the southwest and west, both during the dry season and during the rainy season, these winds have an annual rate of 7.8 km/h.24 In addition, any municipality, including the city, is affected by the hurricane season in the Atlantic (June–November). In which, the continuous tropical storms and hurricanes increase the flow of rivers, damaging some areas with flooding.

Climate data for Santa Ana, El Salvador (1991–2020)
| Month | Jan | Feb | Mar | Apr | May | Jun | Jul | Aug | Sep | Oct | Nov | Dec | Year |
|---|---|---|---|---|---|---|---|---|---|---|---|---|---|
| Record high °C (°F) | 35.8 (96.4) | 37.0 (98.6) | 38.6 (101.5) | 38.6 (101.5) | 39.2 (102.6) | 35.8 (96.4) | 35.2 (95.4) | 34.8 (94.6) | 36.7 (98.1) | 36.0 (96.8) | 34.8 (94.6) | 35.8 (96.4) | 39.2 (102.6) |
| Mean daily maximum °C (°F) | 31.0 (87.8) | 32.6 (90.7) | 34.0 (93.2) | 34.4 (93.9) | 32.7 (90.9) | 31.2 (88.2) | 31.6 (88.9) | 31.6 (88.9) | 30.7 (87.3) | 30.2 (86.4) | 30.1 (86.2) | 30.4 (86.7) | 31.7 (89.1) |
| Daily mean °C (°F) | 22.6 (72.7) | 23.7 (74.7) | 24.9 (76.8) | 25.7 (78.3) | 25.2 (77.4) | 24.2 (75.6) | 24.4 (75.9) | 24.3 (75.7) | 23.7 (74.7) | 23.5 (74.3) | 23.0 (73.4) | 22.6 (72.7) | 24.0 (75.2) |
| Mean daily minimum °C (°F) | 16.9 (62.4) | 17.4 (63.3) | 18.2 (64.8) | 19.4 (66.9) | 20.2 (68.4) | 19.9 (67.8) | 19.7 (67.5) | 19.7 (67.5) | 19.6 (67.3) | 19.5 (67.1) | 18.5 (65.3) | 17.5 (63.5) | 18.9 (66.0) |
| Record low °C (°F) | 10.8 (51.4) | 11.6 (52.9) | 11.5 (52.7) | 13.0 (55.4) | 15.7 (60.3) | 16.9 (62.4) | 15.7 (60.3) | 15.2 (59.4) | 16.0 (60.8) | 13.1 (55.6) | 11.5 (52.7) | 10.2 (50.4) | 10.2 (50.4) |
| Average precipitation mm (inches) | 1.3 (0.05) | 4.8 (0.19) | 13.2 (0.52) | 57.6 (2.27) | 220.8 (8.69) | 303.9 (11.96) | 292.0 (11.50) | 314.5 (12.38) | 322.8 (12.71) | 215.2 (8.47) | 46.6 (1.83) | 12.1 (0.48) | 1,804.8 (71.06) |
| Average relative humidity (%) | 67 | 64 | 63 | 66 | 75 | 81 | 77 | 79 | 84 | 81 | 73 | 70 | 73.3 |
| Mean monthly sunshine hours | 310.0 | 271.2 | 291.4 | 258.0 | 254.2 | 198.0 | 263.5 | 260.4 | 204.0 | 229.4 | 267.0 | 303.8 | 3,110.9 |
| Mean daily sunshine hours | 10.0 | 9.6 | 9.4 | 8.6 | 8.2 | 6.6 | 8.5 | 8.4 | 6.8 | 7.4 | 8.9 | 9.8 | 8.5 |
Source 1: Ministerio de Medio Ambiente y Recursos Naturales
Source 2: NOAA (extremes), Deutscher Wetterdienst (sun 1959–1966)

== History ==
=== Pre-Columbian era ===
The city of Santa Ana has a pre-Columbian origin. There is evidence of Preclassic settlements in the area of the city, mainly in the archaeological site of Villa Rosita, where the dominant centre was located in the area. This and other settlements were depopulated by the eruption of Lake Ilopango in 250 AD.

The city was founded by the Poqomam Maya in the classical period. The Poqomam name of the settlement is unknown, but when the Pipil conquered the area in 1200 during the post-classic period, they gave it the Nahuat name Sihuatehuacán, which means place of priestesses. Sihuatehuacán was located in what is now the suburb of Santa Barbara, west of the Apanchacal and Apanteos rivers.

=== Conquest and colonization ===
The town was conquered by the Spanish between 1530 and 1540. On July 26, 1569, Guatemalan bishop Bernardino Villalpando changed the name from Sihuatehuacán to that of Santa Ana. The new town at the time was part of the Greater Mayorship of San Salvador.

San Salvador, the city of Santa Ana, and the western and central part of the current Salvadoran territory (except St Vincent and the paracentral area) was administered by the mayor of the department of San Salvador. Since 1770, the central parish of the city (located where the cathedral was built later) was the head of the parish of Santa Ana. From 1786-1824, the Santa Ana district was part of the San Salvador municipality (Intendencia de San Salvador).

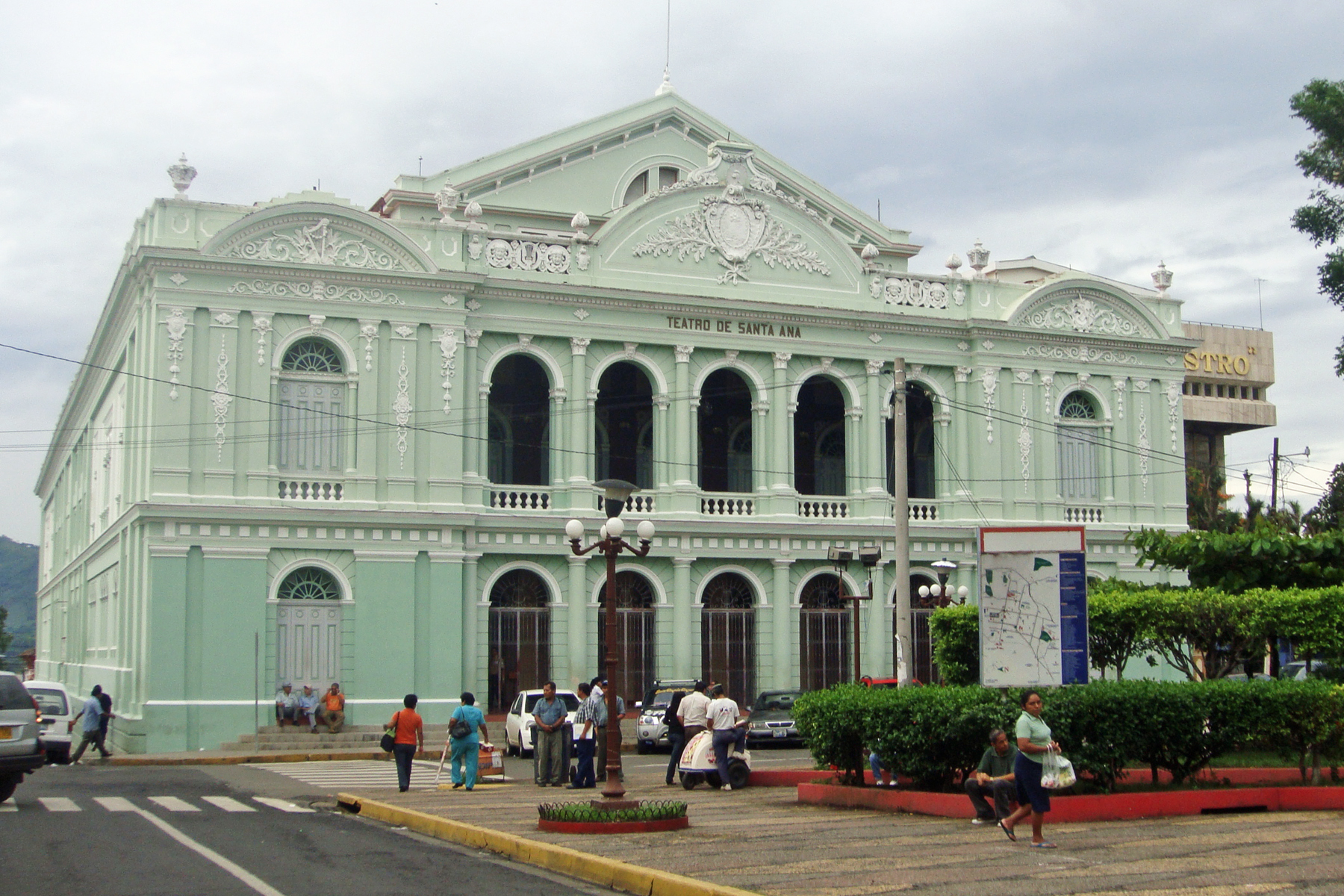
Santa Ana theater

=== 19th century ===
In 1806, the council of the town of Santa Ana was established. Its first mayor was José Mariano Castro. Five years later, there were two uprisings in the town as part of the uprising in San Salvador, the first on 17 November 1811, another on 24 June 1812. In November 1812, it was designated with the title of town.

On 21 December 1821, the council declared independence from Spain. In 1824, it received the title of city, as part of the department of Sonsonate. In 1835, it became the head of that department. In 1854, the town of Santa Lucia Chacalcingo became part of Santa Ana. A year later, the Department of Santa Ana was created.

In 1894, a revolution that would overthrew President Carlos Ezeta, who had ruled the country as de facto dictator (from the current headquarters of the Second Infantry Brigade of Santa Ana) occurred. Since then, the town earned the nickname of "the heroic city" as the 44 rebels who led the revolution were from the municipality. They stormed the government headquarters to end the dictatorship.

=== Postwar 20th century and Civil Santa Ana in 1916 ===
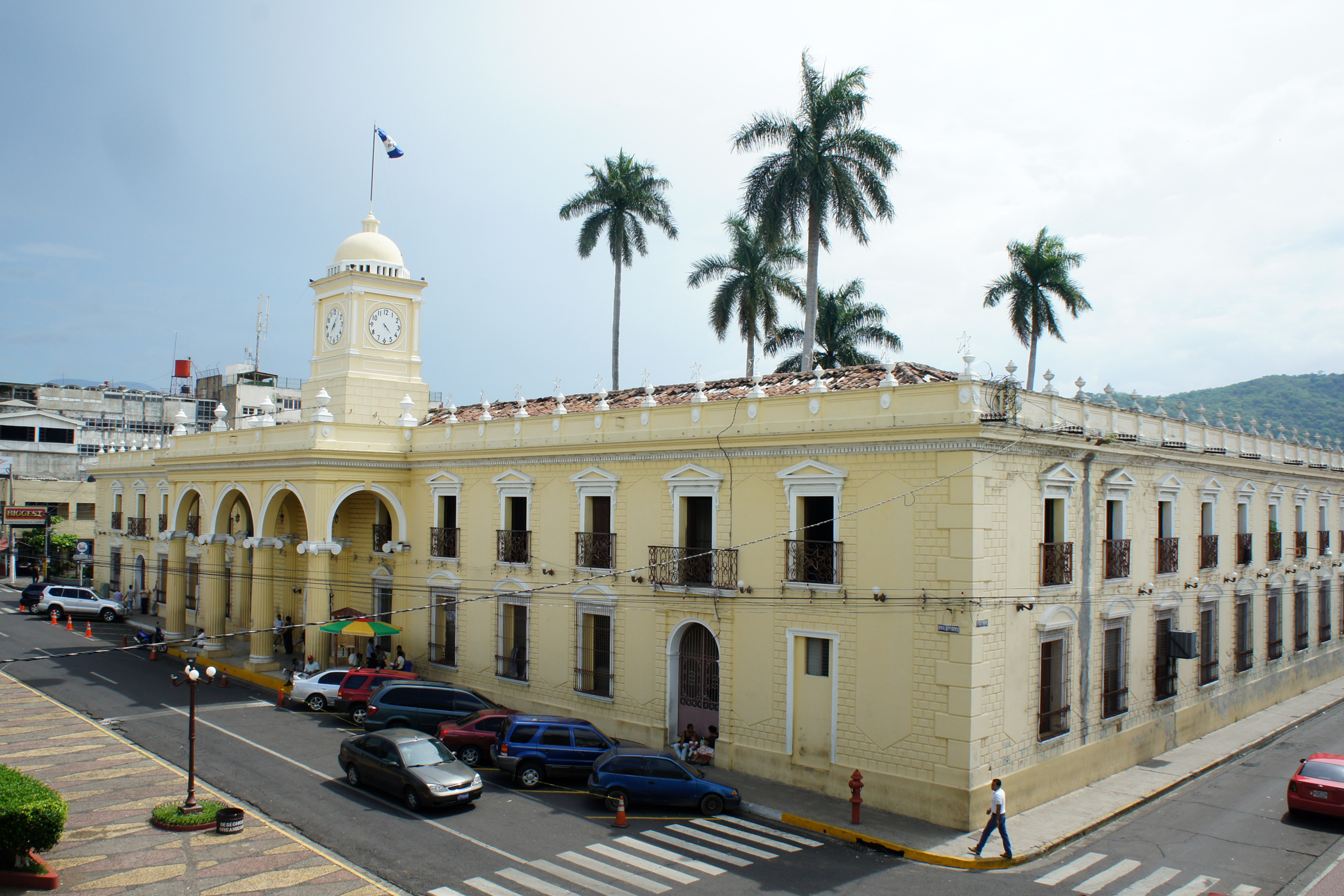
Municipal Palace of Santa Ana

In the so-called "golden age of coffee" in El Salvador, Santa Ana was the most prosperous city in the country, because many of the businessmen who lived in that town owned important coffee processing plants that prepared the coffee for sale. La Hacienda El Molino, owned by the Colombian Rafael Alvarez, was the main plantation and coffee processing plant because of its fame and its technological modernism at the time.

During the civil war in El Salvador (1980–1992), the municipality of Santa Ana was also affected by armed conflict, which led to the emigration of many residents of the city. After the war, Santa Ana and all of El Salvador began to address the problem of rising crime rates, mostly due to the existence of "maras" or gangs, mainly generated by the deportation of undocumented Salvadoran immigrants from the United States. In response to rising gang activity, the council municipal responded with government programs and ordinances.

Since the civil war, the municipality has received allowances sent by Salvadorians living abroad to their friends and family. This money has become the largest source of revenue for Santa Ana and El Salvador.

In 1999 the Urban Development Master Plan (PLAMADUR) was launched by the municipal administration of Moses Macall Monterrosa. The PLAMADUR spurred the growth, expansion and management of ciudad.

Also in 2004, the Salvadorian government introduced the National Land Management Plan and Territorial Development (PNODT) that promotes the development, integration and competitiveness of Salvadoran municipalities. For the purposes of planning and development of municipalities, these have been grouped into regions, subregions and microregions. The municipality of Santa Ana was incorporated into the region, "West Central subregion, Santa Ana - Resume" and "microregion of Santa Ana".

== Education ==
The city of Santa Ana has 183 schools, according to statistics from the Salvadoran Ministry of Education, and 53 of those are private. Some of the best known schools are:

1. Colegio Bautista
2. Liceo San Luis
3. Escuela Interamericana
4. Colegio Latinoamericano
5. Colegio Salesiano San José
6. Colegio Santa María
7. CE INSA
8. Colegio María Auxiliadora
9. Liceo Santaneco

Santa Ana has a few universities, including Universidad Católica de El Salvador, Universidad Modular Abierta, Universidad de El Salvador Facultad Multidiciplinaria de Occidente, Universidad Francisco Gavidia, and Universidad Autónoma de Santa Ana.

== Economy ==
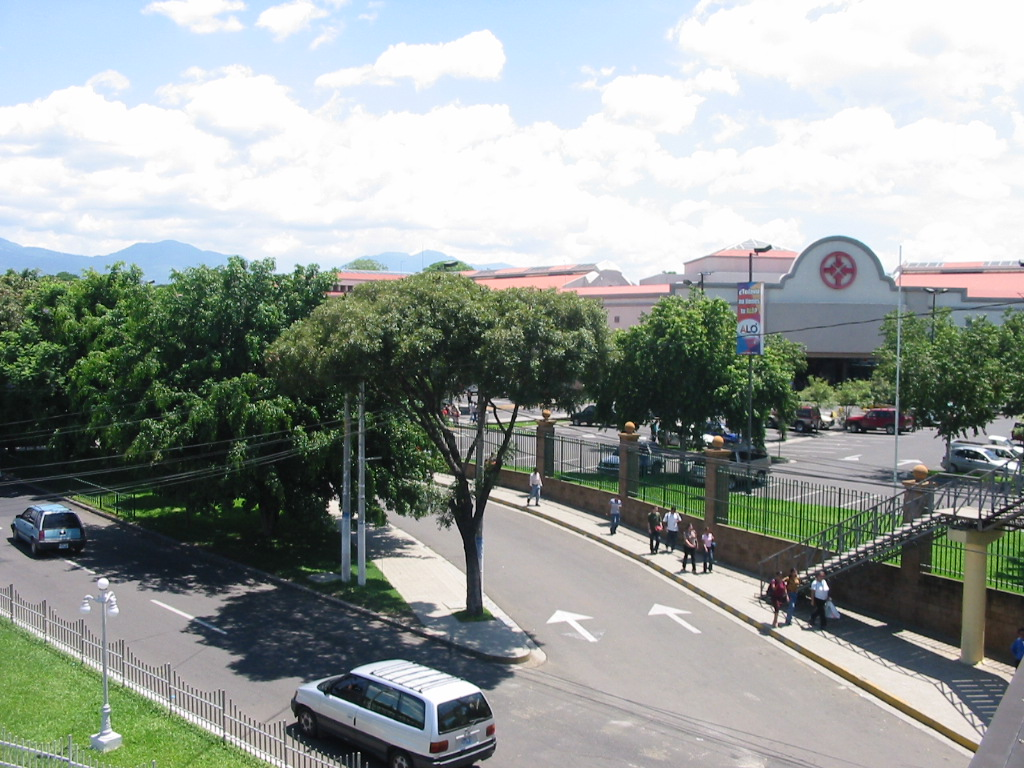
Metrocentro

Santa Ana today is the second largest city in population and importance in El Salvador. The main economic engines of the city are in retail and manufacturing. In the north and west of the city are factories and assembly plants mostly of foreign origin. The southern part of the city is more commercially developed, containing many restaurants, commercial banks, hotels and shopping malls. The largest shopping mall in the city is Metrocentro.

Santa Ana has two main markets: the Colón and Central Markets, only a few streets from one another, offering a great variety of products.

With respect to tourism, the city has many old buildings such as: Catedral de Santa Ana (The Cathedral of Saint Anne) next to the Parque Libertad, Alcaldía Municipal de Santa Ana (Santa Ana City Hall) and the Teatro de Santa Ana (Santa Ana Theater).

The only museum in the city registered by the Concultura is the Occidental Regional Museum, also known as the Museum of the West. However El Museo Aja is also located in the city. There are also the Apanteos and Sihuatehuacán water parks.

Fiestas Julias is a big traditional celebration in Santa Ana during the 15 through the 31 of July. Every year they usually take place in the Oscar quiteño stadium.

== Culture and art ==
The culture of Santa Ana and all of El Salvador is a result of the influence of the pre-Columbian indigenous inhabitants and the Spanish colonization.

The government agency that is responsible for preserving and promoting culture throughout the country is the Ministry of Culture. Likewise, the city has its own decentralized office that is responsible for preserving and promoting culture and art throughout the city: the Coordinator of culture, recreation, art and education (Culturarte).

=== Centers for Cultural Development ===
The city has its own Casa de Cultura, which is managed by the Ministry of Culture and is responsible for disseminating and promoting research, and for expanding local art and art from the entire municipality.

Likewise, there are centers of culture and art education in the city, such as the Western Arts Center which was developed by the Cultural Heritage Association of Santa Ana (Apaculsa).

The main museum of the city is the Western Regional Museum, which is a historical site and also one of culture and art. Another is the Aja Museum, developed by the movement Siglo XXIII, which promotes culture and popular art. The city's David Granadino Public Library is managed by Concultura.

For the presentation of the performing arts, the city has important venues. The main venue, because of its size and age, is the National Theater of the city. Other establishments used for the presentation of performing arts are the Cine Principal (Main Theatre) and the Centro Municipal de Usos Múltiples El Palmar.

== Notable people ==
- Iván Barton (born 1991), is a Salvadoran football referee who is a listed international referee for FIFA since 2018. He is also one of the referees at the Primera División de El Salvador
- Agustín García Calderón (born 1948), former President of the Supreme Court of El Salvador
- Pete Sandoval (born 1964), drummer for Terrorizer, I Am Morbid, ex-Morbid Angel

== Sport ==
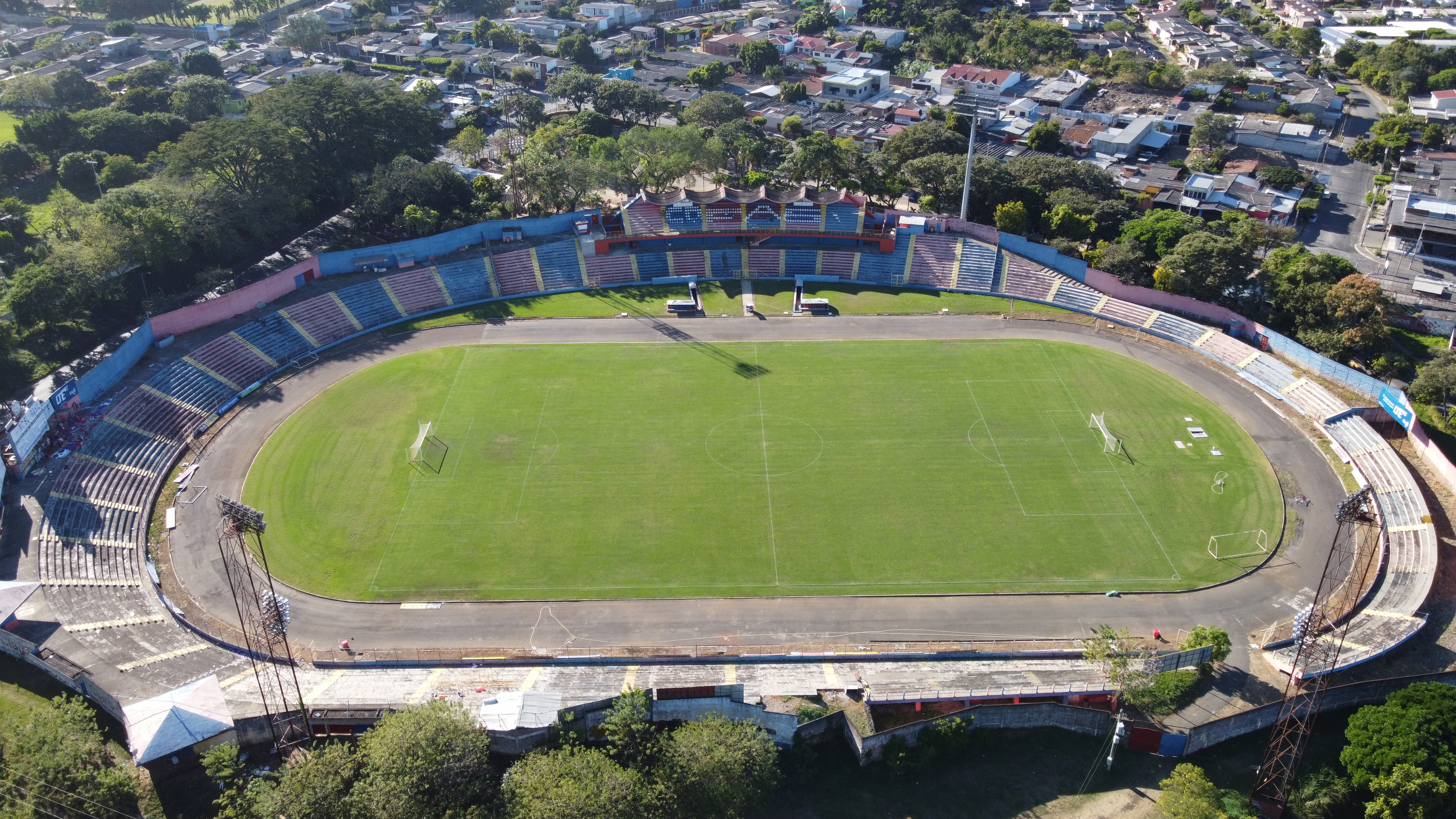
Estadio Óscar Quiteño

Santa Ana is home to C.D. FAS, one of the most famous football (soccer) clubs in El Salvador. Their home stadium is Estadio Óscar Quiteño, built in 1963 with an approximate capacity of 20,000 fans.

== Religion ==
In regard to religion, as in the rest of the country, the population is mostly Catholic, being the host city of the Diocese of Santa Ana, which occupies the departments of Santa Ana and Ahuachapán. It is part of the ecclesiastical province of El Salvador.

Among the most important Catholic churches are the Cathedral of Santa Ana, (where is the image of the patron saint of the city), the El Calvario church (rebuilt in the late 19th century by Fray Felipe de Jesús Moraga, which was destroyed partially by the earthquake of 13 January 2001, and subsequently rebuilt), El Carmen (which has been administered by the Dominican priests since 1929), the Church of Santa Lucia, San Lorenzo church, Santa Barbara Church, the Mother of the Saviour parish church, and San José Obrero.

Also, several Christian evangelical churches, which have seen an increased influx of believers. Other religious groups, such as the Church of Jesus Christ of Latter-day Saints and Jehovah's Witnesses also have followers here.

== Twin towns – sister cities ==
Santa Ana is twinned with:

- La Ceiba, Honduras
- León, Nicaragua
- (Brazil) Piracicaba, Brasil
- (United States) Miramar, Florida, US
- Nueva Trinidad, El Salvador
- Nejapa, El Salvador
- Acajutla, El Salvador
