= Julio Canessa =

Chilean military and political figure

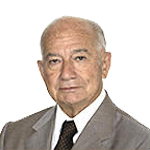

Member of the Senate of Chile
- In office 11 March 1998 – 11 March 2006
- Succeeded by: End of Appointed Senators
- Constituency: Appointed Senador

Member of the Military Junta
- In office 16 October 1985 – 27 November 1997
- President: Augusto Pinochet
- Preceded by: César Benavides
- Succeeded by: Humberto Gordon

Personal details
- Born: 19 March 1925 Valparaíso, Chile
- Died: 24 January 2015 (aged 89) Santiago, Chile
- Spouse: Adriana Benavente
- Children: 3
- Parent(s): Juan Canessa; Julia Robert

Lieutenant General Julio Canessa Roberts (19 March 1925 – 24 January 2015) was a Chilean military and political figure. He was a member of the Government Junta that ruled Chile from 1973 to 1990, representing the Army. He was also a designated Senator between 1998 and 2006.

General Canessa was Army Vice Commander-in-chief from 1983 to 1985 and a member of the Government Junta from 1985 to 1986. He was replaced by Humberto Gordon. In 1998, he was designated Senator after a nomination from the National Security Council. As a Senator he opposed the Concert of Parties for Democracy on the Indigenous law, seeing it as bad for development, and in 2001 he defended landmines as necessary. Later the positions of the Designated Senators were eliminated because of the Constitutional Reforms of 2004. He died at the age of 89 on 24 January 2015.

Military officer and politician. He served as an Institutional Senator for the period 1998–2006, representing the Chilean Army. He was a member of the Government Junta between 1985 and 1987, representing the Army.

== Biography ==
=== Family and youth ===
He was born in Antofagasta on 19 March 1925. He was the son of Juan Bautista Canessa Jorquera, a naval officer and naval engineer, and Julia Robert.

He married Adriana Benavente Sanhueza. They had one daughter and two sons.

=== Professional career ===
In 1942, he entered the Libertador Bernardo O'Higgins Military School, obtaining a bachelor’s degree the following year. After several years, he was assigned to the School of Application in Turin, Italy, where he completed courses in Infantry and Armored Cavalry. Upon his return to Chile, he entered the Army War Academy, where he completed the Regular General Staff Course, graduating first in his class in 1959 and earning the rank of General Staff Officer and Academy Professor.

Between 1944 and 1954, he served in the Mountain Infantry Regiment No. 3 “Yungay” and at the Infantry School. In 1956, he served as an instructor at the Military School, and between 1960 and 1961 he was in charge of the Weapons Classes School Battalion at the Infantry School.

Between 1962 and 1964, he carried out teaching duties as Professor of Tactics and Operations and Intelligence at the Army War Academy.

After resigning from the Government Junta, he worked between 1987 and 1990 at the Chilean Trading Corporation, based in New York, where he served as president.

In the academic field, in 1990 he became the first president of Bernardo O'Higgins University (UBO). In 1992, he completed a Master’s degree in Political Science at the Pontifical Catholic University of Chile. Later, between 1993 and 1997, he served as a professor at the Institute of Political Science of the University of Chile, the National Academy of Political and Strategic Studies, and the Army War Academy.

== Public career ==
In 1965, he was appointed Secretary of the Chilean Military Mission in Washington, D.C., where he remained until 1966. Upon his return, he served in the Planning Directorate of the General Staff of the Chilean Army until 1968.

In 1969, he attained the rank of Commander of the Mountain Infantry Regiment No. 8 “Tucapel,” serving for one year. In 1971, he was appointed Director of the Army Non-Commissioned Officers School, a position he held until 1973.

Following the coup d’état of 11 September 1973, he was promoted in 1974 to the rank of Brigadier General. That same year, he organized the Advisory Committee of the Government Junta and the National Commission for Administrative Reform (CONARA), which he chaired until 1980.

In 1975, he was appointed Commander of Military Institutes, and that same year served as president of the Latin American Center for Development Administration (CLAD).

In 1978, he was promoted to Major General, becoming Head of the Northern Military Region and Inspector General of the Chilean Army in 1979. In 1982, he was appointed Lieutenant General and simultaneously Vice Commander-in-Chief of the Army, a position he held until 1985. In 1983, he was promoted to the rank of Divisional General.

On 11 November 1985, effective as of 1 December 1985, he joined the Government Junta representing the Army, as General Augusto Pinochet was serving as President of the Republic. He held this position until 1 January 1987.

On 23 December 1997, he was appointed by the National Security Council (COSENA) as an Institutional Senator for the period 1998–2006, representing the Chilean Army.

He died in Santiago on 24 January 2015.

== Decorations ==
In the military sphere, he was awarded the Military Star, the Star of Military Merit, and the Grand Star of Merit for 10, 20, and 30 years of service, as well as the decoration “President of the Republic.”

Political offices
Preceded by César Benavides	Member of Government Junta; 1985–1986	Succeeded by Humberto Gordon
