= Mictopsichia rivadeneirai =

Scientific classification
- Kingdom: Animalia
- Phylum: Arthropoda
- Class: Insecta
- Order: Lepidoptera
- Family: Tortricidae
- Genus: Mictopsichia
- Species: M. rivadeneirai

Binomial name
- Mictopsichia rivadeneirai Razowski & Pelz, 2010

Species of moth

Mictopsichia rivadeneirai is a species of moth of the family Tortricidae. It is found in Ecuador.

The wingspan is about 11.5 mm.

== Etymology ==
The species is named in honour of Mr. Francisco Rivadeneira.
