= Chamaepsichia =

Scientific classification
- Kingdom: Animalia
- Phylum: Arthropoda
- Class: Insecta
- Order: Lepidoptera
- Family: Tortricidae
- Subfamily: Tortricinae
- Genus: Chamaepsichia; Razowski, 2009

Genus of moths

Chamaepsichia is a genus of moths belonging to the family Tortricidae.

== Species ==
- Chamaepsichia cetonia Razowski, 2011
- Chamaepsichia chitonregis Razowski, 2011
- Chamaepsichia durranti (Walsingham, 1914)
- Chamaepsichia rubrochroa Razowski, 2009

== See also ==
- List of Tortricidae genera
