= Rubropsichia fuesliniana =

Scientific classification
- Domain: Eukaryota
- Kingdom: Animalia
- Phylum: Arthropoda
- Class: Insecta
- Order: Lepidoptera
- Family: Tortricidae
- Genus: Rubropsichia
- Species: R. fuesliniana

Binomial name
- Rubropsichia fuesliniana (Stoll, in Cramer, 1781)

Synonyms
- Phalaena (Tortrix) fuesliniana Stoll, in Cramer, 1781; Phalaena fueslynialis Stoll, in Cramer, 1782; Phalaena fueslyniana Verloren, 1837; Mictopsichia fuesslyana Walsingham, 1914; Mictopsichia superba Felder & Rogenhofer, 1875

Species of moth

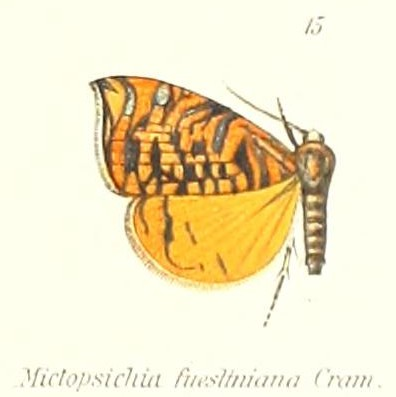
Rubropsichia fuesliniana

Rubropsichia fuesliniana is a species of moth of the family Tortricidae. It is found in Brazil and Suriname.
