= Benevides Juan Ramirez =

Spanish painter

Benevides Juan Ramirez was a Spanish painter of the late-Baroque period. He learned drawing from his brother Josef, a sculptor. In 1753, his picture of the Election of King Pelayo, gained him election as a supernumerary professor in the Royal Academy of San Fernando After studying under Corrado Giaquinto he neglected painting for music, and died at Zaragoza in 1782.
