= Mictopsichia benevides =

Scientific classification
- Domain: Eukaryota
- Kingdom: Animalia
- Phylum: Arthropoda
- Class: Insecta
- Order: Lepidoptera
- Family: Tortricidae
- Genus: Mictopsichia
- Species: M. benevides

Binomial name
- Mictopsichia benevides Razowski, 2009

Species of insect

Mictopsichia benevides is a species of moth of the family Tortricidae. It is found in Brazil.

== Description ==
The wingspan is about 10.5 mm.

== Etymology ==
The name refers to the type locality, Benevides, Pará, Brazil.
