= Benavides =

Benavides can refer to:

== People ==
- Antonio José Benavides, Venezuelan Major General
- Benavides (singer), Venezuelan singer
- Brad Benavides, American-Spanish-Guatemalan racing driver
- César Benavides, Chilean Army general
- Freddie Benavides, American baseball player and coach
- Ismael Benavides Ferreyros, Peruvian politician
- Jeannette Benavides (born 1952), Costa Rican nanotechnologist and physical chemist
- Jesse Benavides, American former professional boxer
- José Benavides (director) (1911–1945), Mexican film director
- José María Benavides (1945–2024), Spanish sailor
- Kevin Benavides, Argentine rally raid motorcyclist
- Marta Benavides, Salvadoran activist
- Manuel de Benavides y Aragón, Spanish noble and diplomat
- Miguel de Benavides, Spanish clergyman
- Óscar R. Benavides, 20th century Peruvian president
- Osvaldo Benavides, Mexican actor and filmmaker
- Patricia Benavides, Peruvian lawyer
- Plácido Benavides (1810–1837) Mexican-born settler in De Leon's Colony, Victoria County, Texas.
- Prudencio Benavides, Cuban baseball player
- Ramiro Benavides, Bolivian former professional tennis player
- Roque Benavides, Peruvian businessman
- Santos Benavides, Confederate colonel

== Places ==
- Benavides, Texas, in the United States
- Benavides, León, in Spain

== Business ==
- Farmacias Benavides
