= César Benavides =

Chilean Army general (1912–2011)

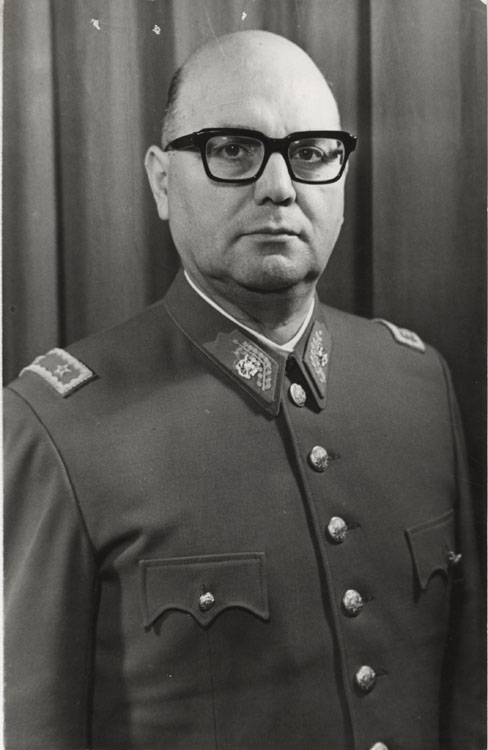
- César Benavides in 1974

Member of the Government Military Junta
- In office 11 March 1981 – 2 December 1985
- President: Augusto Pinochet
- Preceded by: Augusto Pinochet
- Succeeded by: Julio Canessa

Minister of National Defense of Chile
- In office 14 April 1978 – 29 December 1980
- President: Augusto Pinochet
- Preceded by: Herman Brady
- Succeeded by: Carlos Forestier

Minister of the Interior of Chile
- In office 11 July 1974 – 14 April 1978
- President: Augusto Pinochet
- Preceded by: Óscar Bonilla
- Succeeded by: Sergio Fernández

Personal details
- Born: 12 March 1912 Santiago, Chile
- Died: 25 March 2011 (aged 99) Santiago, Chile
- Education: Libertador Bernardo O'Higgins Military Academy

Military service
- Allegiance: Chilean Army
- Branch/service: Chilean Army
- Years of service: 1936–1985
- Rank: Lieutenant general
- Unit: Infantry

César Raúl Benavides Escobar (Note: In this Spanish name, the first or paternal surname is Benavides and the second or maternal family name is Escobar.) (March 12, 1912 – March 25, 2011) was a Chilean military officer, lieutenant general of the Chilean Army.

He served as Minister of the Interior (1974–1978) and Minister of National Defense (1978–1980) under Augusto Pinochet, and was also a member of the Military Government Junta between 1981 and 1985, representing the Army.

== Family ==
He was born in Santiago on March 12, 1912. In 1944 he married María del Carmen Montero Marín, daughter of lawyer and notary Félix Montero Urzúa (also a director of the Liberal Party) and María Marín. They had one daughter, María Isabel.

== Military and political career ==
He entered the Military Academy in 1936 and graduated as a second lieutenant in telecommunications in 1939.

He rose steadily through the ranks, served in engineering and telecommunications units, and studied at the Signal School in Fort Monmouth, United States, in 1958.

In 1967, President Eduardo Frei Montalva appointed him military attaché in Quito, Ecuador. Later, in 1972, President Salvador Allende appointed him Director of the Army War Academy and promoted him to brigadier general.

As a close ally of General Augusto Pinochet, Benavides played an active role in organizing the 1973 Chilean coup d'état and later commanded the V Army Division in Punta Arenas.

He was Minister of the Interior (1974–1978), where he directed repressive actions against opposition groups, and later Minister of National Defense (1978–1980).

On March 11, 1981, he joined the Government Junta as Army representative, succeeding Pinochet after the enactment of the 1980 Constitution of Chile. He remained until December 2, 1985, when he retired from the Junta and from the Army.

Throughout his career he received several decorations, including the “Gran Estrella al Mérito Militar” and the “Presidente de la República” Medal.

=== Military promotions ===
- 1936: Cadet
- 1939: Second lieutenant
- 1940: Ensign
- 1941: Sub-lieutenant
- 1947: Lieutenant
- 1948: Captain
- 1955: Major
- 1962: Lieutenant colonel
- 1968: Colonel
- 1972: Brigadier general
- 1974: Divisional general
- 1978: Lieutenant general
