= Marta Benavides =

Salvadoran activist

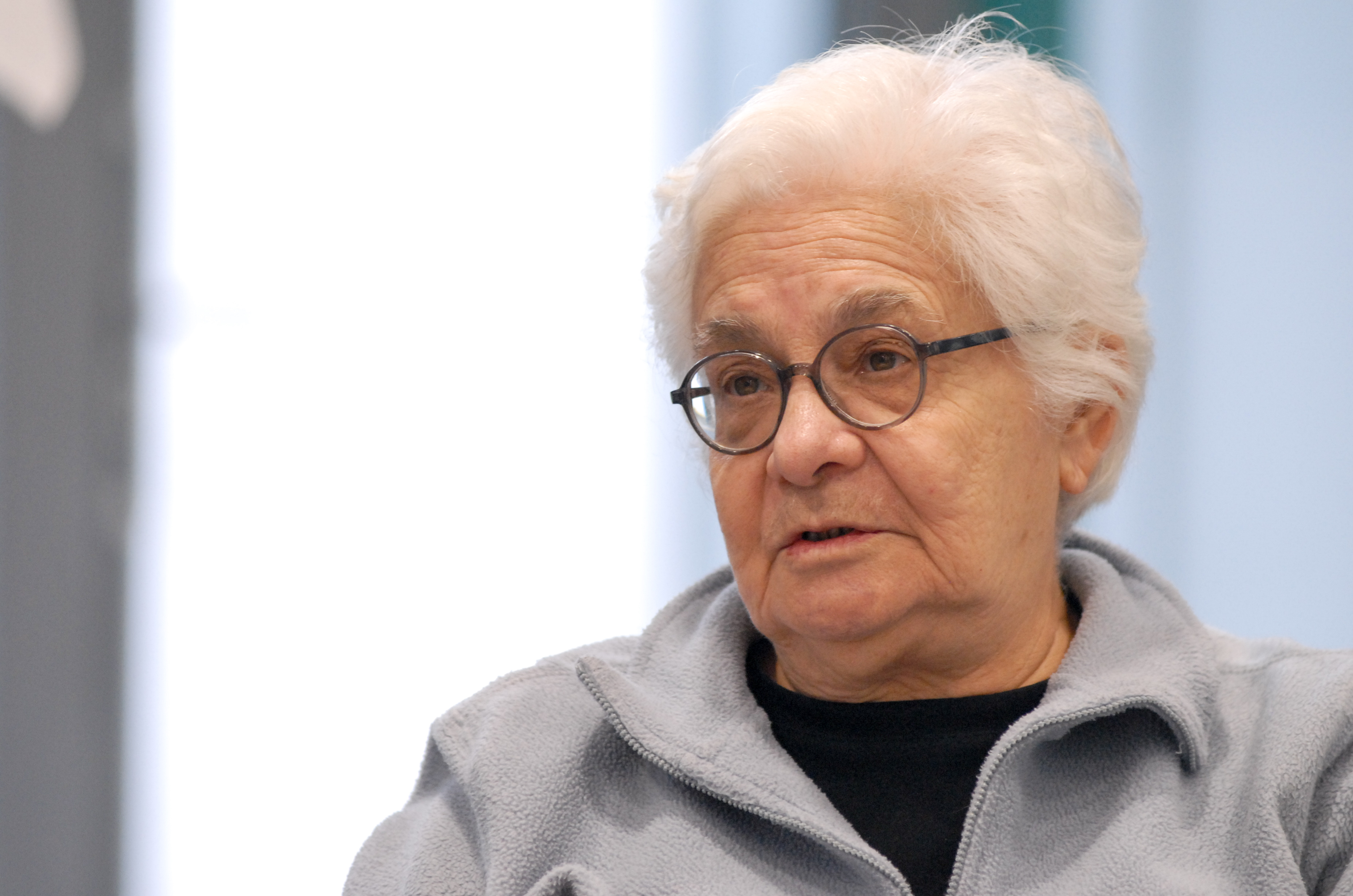
- Marta Benavides, 2018
- Born: 1943 (age 82–83)
- Occupation: Religious leader
- Known for: Human rights work

Marta Benavides (born 1943) is a feminist religious leader from El Salvador. She is a theologian, ordained American Baptist minister, permaculturist, educator, and artist.

== Activism ==
Benavides began working for human rights and peace in the 1960s. After the military coup in El Salvador in 1979 and the outbreak of the Salvadoran Civil War, she became the leader of the Ecumenical Committee for Humanitarian Aid, a group sponsored by the Archbishop Óscar Romero. Romero was assassinated in 1980. In 1982, Benavides went into exile in Mexico and the United States, and continued her efforts from there.

In 1992, following the Chapultepec Peace Accords, Benavides returned to El Salvador and founded the organization Siglo XXIII, also known as the International Institute for Cooperation Amongst Peoples, which promotes cultural activities as a way of achieving sustainable peace. She has led workshops on sustainable agriculture, human rights, and the prevention of community and family violence.

== Awards ==
In 2003, she was one of 33 Laureates of the Women's World Summit Foundation Prize for Women's Creativity in Rural Life. In 2005 she was among the 1,000 women nominated for the Nobel Peace Prize. In 2009, she was awarded the Woman Peacemaker Prize from the Institute of Joan B. Kroc for Peace and Justice in the University of San Diego, California. She was one of the co-chairs of the Global Call to Action Against Poverty (GCAP).
