= Humberto Gordon =

Chilean Army general (1927–2000)

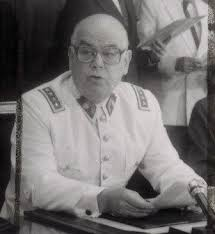

Humberto Gordon Rubio (21 September 1927 – 15 June 2000) was a Chilean Army general and member of the Government Junta that ruled Chile from 1973–1990. He served on the junta as a member from 1985–1987.
