= Chamaepsichia durranti =

Scientific classification
- Domain: Eukaryota
- Kingdom: Animalia
- Phylum: Arthropoda
- Class: Insecta
- Order: Lepidoptera
- Family: Tortricidae
- Genus: Chamaepsichia
- Species: C. durranti

Binomial name
- Chamaepsichia durranti (Walsingham, 1914)

Synonyms
- Mictopsichia durranti Walsingham, 1914

Species of moth

Chamaepsichia durranti is a species of moth of the family Tortricidae. It is found in Brazil.
