= List of Catholic dioceses in El Salvador =

The Catholic Church in El Salvador comprises only a Latin hierarchy, joint in the national episcopal conference (Conferencia Episcopal de El Salvador, CEDES), consisting of

- one ecclesiastical province headed by the Metropolitan archbishop (in the capital) with seven suffragan dioceses, each headed by a bishop
- a military ordinariate for the military.

There are no Eastern Catholic or pre-diocesan jurisdictions.

There is also an Apostolic Nunciature to El Salvador, as papal diplomatic representation (embassy-level) in the national capital San Salvador.

== Current Latin Dioceses ==
=== Exempt ===
- Military Ordinariate of El Salvador (Spanish: Obispado Castrense en El Salvador), a modern Army bishopric

=== Ecclesiastical province of San Salvador ===
- Metropolitan Archdiocese of San Salvador
  - Diocese of Chalatenango
  - Diocese of San Miguel
  - Diocese of San Vicente
  - Diocese of Santa Ana
  - Diocese of Santiago de María
  - Diocese of Sonsonate
  - Diocese of Zacatecoluca

== Defunct jurisdictions ==
There are no titular sees.

All defunct (notably promoted) jurisdictions have current Latin successor sees.

== See also ==
- List of Catholic dioceses (structured view)

== Sources and external links ==
- GCatholic.org - data for all sections.
- Catholic-Hierarchy entry.
