= Military Ordinariate of El Salvador =

Catholic ecclesiastical jurisdiction in El Salvador

Military Ordinariate in El Salvador Ordinariato Militar en El Salvador

Location
- Country: El Salvador

Information
- Denomination: Catholic Church
- Sui iuris church: Latin Church
- Rite: Roman Rite
- Established: 25 March 1968 (58 years ago)

Current leadership
- Pope: Leo XIV
- Bishop: Reinaldo Sorto Martínez

The Military Ordinariate in El Salvador (Spanish: Ordinariato Militar en El Salvador) is a Latin Church ecclesiastical territory or military ordinariate of the Catholic Church with jurisdiction over Catholics serving in the Armed Forces of El Salvador. While not a diocese, the ordinary of the ordinariate is a bishop. The ordinariate is exempt directly to the Holy See and the Roman Congregation for Bishops.

It is headquartered Calle Los Eucaliptos y Avda. Las Gardenias 157, Colonia Las Mercedes in San Salvador, the national capital of El Salvador, in Central America.

== History ==
It was established as a Military vicariate of El Salvador on 25 March 1968, with the first military vicar appointed on 4 November 1968.

It was elevated to a military ordinariate on 21 July 1986.

According to an online news brief from Catholic News Service (CNS) posted on Tuesday, September 11, 2012, Bishop Fabio Reynaldo Colindres Abarca and former guerrilla commander Raul Mijango mediated a truce between El Salvador's two most prominently violent gangs, MS-13 (Mara Salvatrucha) and Barrio 18 which had roots in civil war-era young Salvadorans who illegally entered the U.S. and experienced the gangs there before deportation, and the government.

== Statistics ==
As per 2014, it provides pastoral care to Roman Catholics serving in the Armed Forces of El Salvador and their families in 37 parishes with 38 priests (diocesan) and 6 seminarians.

== Ordinaries ==
Military Vicar of El Salvador

- José Eduardo Alvarez Ramírez, C.M. (appointed 4 November 1968 – see below became military ordinary 21 July 1986), Titular Bishop of Tabunia (1965.10.07 – 1969.12.09), also Auxiliary Bishop of San Salvador (El Salvador) (1965.10.07 – 1968.11.04)

Military Ordinaries of El Salvador

- José Eduardo Alvarez Ramírez, Congregation of the Mission (C.M.) (see above 21 July 1986 – resigned 7 March 1987), also Bishop of San Miguel (El Salvador) (1969.12.09 – retired 1997.04.10) and President of Episcopal Conference of El Salvador (1980 – 1983), died 2000
- Roberto Joaquín Ramos Umaña (appointed 7 March 1987 – died 23 June 1993), Titular Bishop of Sebarga (1987.03.07 – 1993.06.23)
- Apostolic Administrator Fernando Sáenz Lacalle (1993.07.03 – 1997.06.19), while first Auxiliary Bishop of Santa Ana (El Salvador) (1984.12.22 – 1995.04.22) and Titular Bishop of Tabbora (1984.12.22 – 1995.04.22), later Metropolitan Archbishop of San Salvador (1995.04.22 – retired 2008.12.27) and President of Episcopal Conference of El Salvador (1998 – 2008.12.27)
- Apostolic Administrator Father Luis Morao Andreazza, Friars Minor (O.F.M.) (1997.06.19 – 2003.11.12), later Auxiliary Bishop of Santa Ana (El Salvador) (2003.11.12 – 2007.04.21) and Titular Bishop of Tullia (2003.11.12 – 2007.04.21), then Bishop of Chalatenango (El Salvador) (2007.04.21 – retired 2016.07.14)
- Apostolic Administrator Fabio Reynaldo Colindres Abarca (2003.11.12 – 2008.02.02 see below)
- Fabio Reynaldo Colindres Abarca (see above, appointed February 2, 2008 – February 22, 2020); also Apostolic Administrator of Sonsonate (El Salvador) (2011.10.08 – 2012.06.11); appointed Bishop of San Miguel 2017.12.07
- Reinaldo Sorto Martínez (appointed June 6 2024); Priest of San Salvador (El Salvador) (May 5, 1994 – June 6, 2024)

== See also ==
- List of Catholic dioceses in El Salvador
