= Episcopal Conference of El Salvador =

Assembly of Catholic bishops

The Episcopal Conference of El Salvador (Spanish: Conferencia Episcopal de El Salvador, CEDES) is the episcopal conference of the Catholic Church in El Salvador.

ECES is a member of the Latin American Episcopal Conference and the Central Episcopal Secretariate Central of America (CESCA).

List of presidents of the Bishops' Conference:

1958-1967: Luis Chávez y González, Archbishop of San Salvador

1967-1970: Pedro Arnoldo Aparicio y Quintanilla, bishop of San Vicente

1970-1975: Benjamin Barrera y Reyes, bishop of Santa Ana

1975-1977: Luis Chávez y González, Archbishop of San Salvador

1977-1980: Pedro Arnoldo Aparicio y Quintanilla, bishop of San Vicente

1980-1983: José Eduardo Alvarez Ramirez, Military Ordinary

1983-1988: Marco Rene Revelo Contreras, bishop of Santa Ana

1988-1992: Romeo Tovar Astorga, bishop of Zacatecoluca

1992-1994: Arturo Rivera Damas, archbishop of San Salvador

1995-1998: Marco Rene Revelo Contreras, bishop of Santa Ana

1998-2008: Fernando Saenz Lacalle, Archbishop of San Salvador

2009 - ... : José Luis Escobar Alas, Archbishop of San Salvador

== See also ==
- Catholic Church in El Salvador
