= Fabio Reynaldo Colindres Abarca =

Salvadoran catholic bishop

Fabio Reynaldo Colindres Abarca The Most Reverend
- Bishop of San Miguel
- Church: Catholic Church
- Archdiocese: Roman Catholic Archdiocese of San Salvador
- Diocese: Roman Catholic Diocese of San Miguel (El Salvador)
- Appointed: April 7, 2018
- Predecessor: Miguel Ángel Morán Aquino
- Previous post: Military Ordinariate of El Salvador March 29, 2008-December 7, 2017

Orders
- Ordination: July 5, 1986 by José Oscar Barahona Castillo
- Consecration: March 29, 2008 by Luigi Pezzuto

Personal details
- Born: Fabio Reynaldo Colindres Abarca; June 20, 1961 (age 65) Ilobasco, Cabañas Department, El Salvador
- Denomination: Catholicism
- Education: Pontifical Gregorian University

Fabio Reynaldo Colindres Abarca (born in Ilobasco, Cabañas, El Salvador on June 20, 1961) is a Catholic Bishop, Professor, Salvadoran Christian theologian.

== Biography ==
He was born on June 20, 1961, in the city of Ilobasco located in the Department of Cabanas, El Salvador. He grew up and went to primary and secondary school in Ilobasco.

In his youth he decided to join the path of priesthood, and joined "The Mission of Fathers of Guatemala," and studied philosophy. Afterwards he pursued studies in theology in the Seminary of San José of the Mountain in San Salvador.

After being ordained as a priest, he pursued higher education in Rome, Italy studying at the Pontifical Gregorian University, where he majored in Christian theology.

On July 5, 1986, he was ordained as a priest to serve the Diocese of San Vicente, by the then bishop, José Oscar Barahona Castillo.

Once he returned to El Salvador, he began to exercise his pastoral ministry. From 1989 to 2000, he was an educator at Libro sagrado at the San Jose of the Mountain Seminary in San Salvador, the same Seminary in which he had once studied at. He was also the sub-secretary of the Episcopal Conference of El Salvador (CEDES), a member of the International Council for Catechesis (Co.In.Cat.) and a Military Chaplain.

From the year 2000 up until 2008 he was the General Chaplain and Apostolic administrator of the Military Ordinariate of El Salvador.

== Episcopate ==
=== The Military's Bishop of El Salvador ===
On February 2, 2008, after years of working in the Military Bishopric of El Salvador; Pope Benedict XVI named him the new Bishop of the Salvadoran military. He received episcopal consecration on March 29, 2008, under the Papal Ambassador of El Salvador and Belize Luigi Pezzuto, and co-consecrators were the then Bishop of San Vicente, José Oscar Barahona Castillo who also consecrated him as a priest, as well as Rodrigo Orlando Cabrera Cuéllar, then Bishop of Santiago de Maria.

From the October 8, 2011 until the July 11, 2012, he was the diocesan administrator of the Diocese of Sonsonate, when it was vacant.

=== Bishop of San Miguel ===
On December 7, 2017, Pope Francis named him Bishop of San Miguel and on April 7, 2018, he took canonical possession at the diocesan cathedral in San Miguel.

== See also ==
- 2012–2014 Salvadoran gang truce

== External attachments ==
- Bishops of San Miguel, El Salvador
- Official Hierarchy
- Diocese of San Miguel
