= Reinaldo Sorto Martínez =

Reinaldo Sorto Martínez The Most Reverend
- Bishop of the Armed Forces
- Native name: Reinaldo Sorto Martínez
- Church: Catholic Church
- Predecessor: Fabio Reynaldo Colindres Abarca
- Other post: Priest

Orders
- Ordination: May 19th, 1994
- Consecration: July 20th, 2024 by Luigi Roberto Cona

Personal details
- Born: Reinaldo Sorto Martínez; March 10th 1961 Zacatecoluca, La Paz Department, El Salvador
- Denomination: Catholicism
- Education: University
- Alma mater: University of Navarra
- Motto: Exardescentia pro Domine (Zealous for the Lord)

Reinaldo Sorto Martínez is a Catholic Bishop of the Military Ordinariate of El Salvador.

== Biography ==
Born on March 10th, 1961 in the city of Zacatecoluca located in the La Paz Department. He grew up and attended primary and secondary school in Zacatecoluca.

After secondary school, he decided to join the path of priesthood and attended the Seminary of San Jose of the Mountain in San Salvador, El Salvador where he studied philosophy and Christian theology.

On March 19th, 1994 he was ordained as a priest and in 2001 he pursued a major in Dogmatic Theology. He finished his studies in 2003 at the University of Navarra in Pamplona, Spain a private Catholic university.

He returned to El Salvador in 2003 and was the Parish Priest at the Parish of Our Lady of Lourdes, Colon, Department of La Libertad, El Salvador until 2016 when he moved parishes to San José of the Mountain, San Salvador. He continued to be the parish priest until 2019 when he served at the Parish of the Immaculate Conception, Santa Tecla. In 2022 he was the general vicar of the Archdiocese of San Salvador.

=== Episcopate ===
On July 13th, 2024 he was appointed Bishop military ordinary for El Salvador by Pope Francis, though he does not belong to a diocese, he reports directly to the Holy See and the Roman Congregation for Bishops.

On July 20th, 2024 he received episcopal consecration from Archbishop Luigi Roberto Cona at the Metropolitan Cathedral of San Salvador, Archdiocese of San Salvador.

== See also ==
- List of Catholic Diocese in El Salvador
- Official Hierarchy
