= Romero (film) =

1989 American-Mexican co-production film by John Duigan

- Directed by: John Duigan
- Written by: John Sacret Young
- Produced by: Ellwood (Bud) Kieser
- Starring: Raúl Juliá; Richard Jordan; Ana Alicia; Harold Gould; Eddie Velez; Tony Plana
- Cinematography: Geoff Burton
- Edited by: Frans Vanderburg
- Music by: Gabriel Yared
- Production company: Paulist Pictures
- Distributed by: Warner Bros.
- Release date: August 25, 1989
- Running time: 102 minutes
- Countries: United States; Mexico
- Language: English
- Budget: $3.5 million
- Box office: $1.3 million

Romero is a 1989 biographical film depicting the story of Salvadoran archbishop Óscar Romero, who organized peaceful protests against the violent military regime, eventually at the cost of his own life. The film stars Raúl Juliá as Oscar Romero, Richard Jordan as Romero's close friend and fellow martyred priest, Rutilio Grande, as well as actors Ana Alicia and Harold Gould. Although the film depicts true events, there are some fictional characters. It's an international co-production film between the United States and Mexico.

== Plot ==
During the 1977 El Salvadoran presidential election, public unrest is at an all-time high over fears of election fraud. In the midst of a Marxist-Leninist guerrilla insurgency by the Farabundo Martí National Liberation Front, the anti-communist military dictatorship uses death squads to abduct, torture and "disappear" anyone who speaks about their terrible human rights record. The military also prevents average voters from getting to the polls; soldiers are shown blocking a bus bringing people to town on election day. When the people decide to walk, the military shoots up their vans so that they have no transportation for the return journey.

The Vatican elevates theologically conservative Oscar Arnulfo Romero (Raul Julia) to the position of Archbishop of San Salvador, hoping that he will not get involved in politics. Although apolitical, Romero is afraid of the government's increasing hostility. He initially refrains from stirring anti-government sentiments, but, as he spends more time as archbishop, he sees evidence of deception, oppression, and systemic murder, after which he cannot support the government in good conscience and begins to speak out. After the assassination of Father Rutilio Grande (Richard Jordan), an outspoken Jesuit advocate for the poor and close friend of Father Romero's, Romero begins to take a stand against the government's policies, prompting the government to retaliate by ordering death squads to target the priests of his Archdiocese.

After failing to rescue a pro-government hostage of the Pro-Soviet guerrillas in a botched ransom, Romero discovers that his friend Father Osuna (Alejandro Bracho), a militant critic of the military regime, has been captured and tortured. After securing his release, Romero instigates a boycott of the president-elect's inauguration, defying him by saying Mass in a church the Salvadoran military has taken over as a barracks. He later attempts to secure the release of a soldier taken hostage with Fr. Osuna by the guerrillas, but is arrested in the process. Fr. Osuna is subsequently tortured to death, despite Romero's protesting pleas.

Undeterred, Romero rejects the violent methods of the guerrillas, but is nonetheless assassinated while saying Mass, specifically while consecrating the Eucharist. The film concludes with text stating:

Archbishop Romero was murdered on March 24, 1980. He had spoken the disturbing truth. Many chose not to listen. As a result, between 1980 and 1989 more than 60,000 Salvadorians were killed. But the struggle for peace and freedom, justice and dignity goes on.

By 1992, when the Salvadorian Civil War ended (three years after the movie was made), the total number of Salvadorians killed had increased to over 75,000.

== Cast ==
- Raúl Juliá as Archbishop Óscar Romero, archbishop of San Salvador
- Richard Jordan as Father Rutilio Grande, SJ
- Alejandro Bracho as Father Alfonzo Osuna, SJ
- Tony Plana as Father Manuel Morantes, SJ
- Evangelina Elizondo as Josephina Gatedo
- Lucy Reina as Lucia, Poor Campesino. (Fictional Character)
- Ana Alicia as Arista Zelada, An Upper-Class Friend of Romero's. (Fictional Character)
- Omar Chagall as Rafael Zelada, The Minister of Agriculture and Arista's Husband (Fictional character)
- Harold Gould as Francisco Galedo, Arista's Rich Father (Fictional Character.)
- Eddie Velez as Lieutenant Ricardo Columa, Right-Wing Military and Political Leader (Fictional Character)
- Robert Viharo as Colonel Ernesto Dorio (Fictional Character)
- Harold Cannon as General Carlos Humberto Romero, Military Dictator of El Salvador from 1977 to 1979 (no relation to Archbishop Romero)
- Al Ruscio as Bishop Estrada, The Military Vicar of El Salvador and Opponent of Romero
- Claudio Brook as Bishop Flores, Vacillating Bishop
- Martin LaSalle as Bishop Arturo Rivera y Damas, Bishop of Santiago de María (he became Archbishop of San Salvador after Romero's death)
- Eduardo López Rojas as Bishop Cordova, An Ally of Romero
- Tony Perez as Father Rafael Villez, Secretary of The Bishops' Conference

== Production ==
An international co-production between the United States and Mexico, Romero is the first feature film from Paulist Pictures, a company founded by the Paulist Fathers, a Roman Catholic society of priests. This was the first time a Catholic company produced a major film. The company was also known for the production of a long-standing television series called Insight. The film was screened in 1989 at the Toronto International Film Festival. It was directed by Australian filmmaker John Duigan and produced by Paulist Pictures founder Father Ellwood (Bud) Kieser. Alfonso Cuarón, a Mexican film director, worked as an assistant director for this film. Composer Gabriel Yared, who went on to win BAFTA Awards and an Oscar for his other scores, composed the music for Romero. The movie was filmed in Mexico and set in El Salvador.

== Reception ==
Romero was generally well received by critics. The film holds an 80% rating on Rotten Tomatoes, based on 10 reviews. Roger Ebert of the Chicago Sun-Times gave the film a mildly positive review, awarding it two and a half stars out of four. Ebert praised Julia's "restrained and reasonable" performance but felt that the film was predictable and therefore not as powerful as other biopics. Spirituality and Practice gave the film a positive review stating it as an "excellent drama" with most of the praise going towards Raul Julia in his performance as Romero.

Romero did receive criticism on how it did not shed light on US involvement. Kevin Thomas of the Los Angeles Times stated the fact that "the film doesn't deal with the role of the American government in El Salvador's plight, beyond a plea from Romero for the US to stop sending arms that will be only used against his country's people." Vincent Canby of The New York Times thought that the film "is more important as the brief, considerably simplified biography of a heroic man than as cinema. The film's manner is that of a textbook."
