= Catholic University of El Salvador =

Private university in Santa Ana, El Salvador

- Universidad Católica de El Salvador
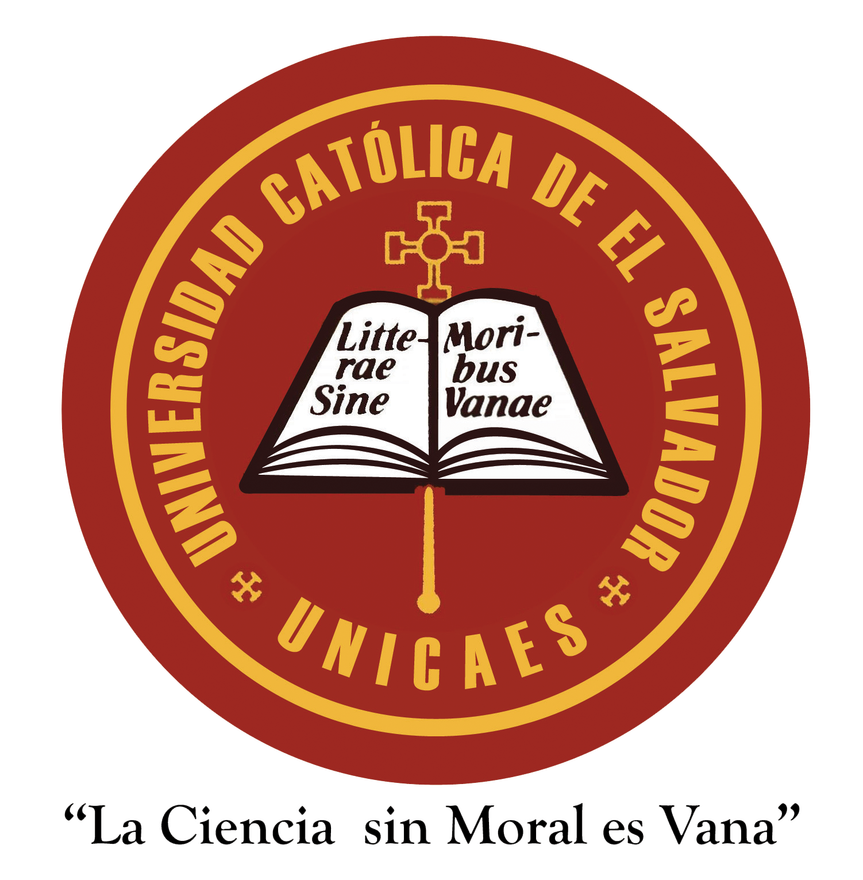
- Former names: Universidad Católica de Occidente
- Motto: Litterae sine moribus vanae
- Motto in English: Letters without morals are useless.
- Type: private
- Established: April 13, 1982
- Founders: Marco René Revelo Contreras John Paul II
- President: Miguel Ángel Morán Aquino
- Vice-president: Antonio Martínez Zaldívar
- Rector: Miguel Ángel Morán Aquino
- Dean: Master Jaime Osmín Trigueros Chávez as Dean of the Faculty of Sciences and Humanities; Master Ricardo Ernesto Morales Guerrero as Dean of the Faculty of Business Sciences; Maestro Mauricio Ernesto Velásquez Soriano as Dean of the Faculty of Engineering and Architecture; Dr. Walter Alexander Aguilar Morán as Dean of the Faculty of Health Sciences; Master Juan Alfonso Trigueros Chávez as Dean of the Multidisciplinary Faculty of the Ilobasco Regional Center
- Academic staff: 438
- Students: 6,970 (2018)
- Location: Km 64, Calle Antigua A San Salvador, Santa Ana, Santa Ana, 0210, Santa Ana, El Salvador
- Campus: 72 acres (29 ha); Urban
- Colors: wine and gold
- Website: catolica.edu.sv/about-us
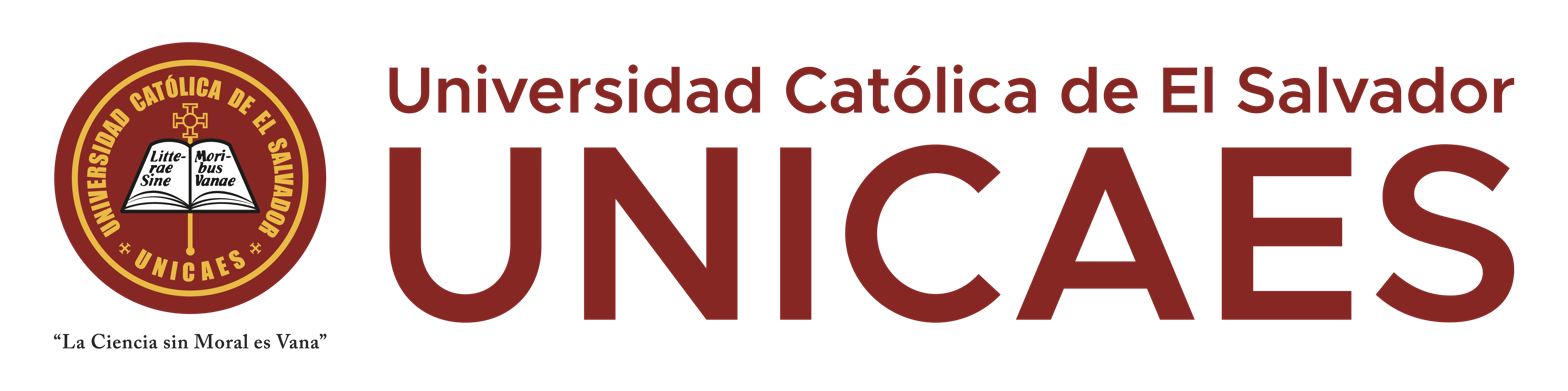

The Catholic University of El Salvador (UNICAES) (Spanish: Universidad Católica de El Salvador) is private Catholic university in Santa Ana, El Salvador. Founded on April 13, 1982, by Marco René Revelo Contreras and John Paul II, it is administered by the Diocese of Santa Ana and supervise by the Episcopal Conference of El Salvador (CEDES). The campus is located in the center of the city, its headquarters are located in the city of Santa Ana and has two regional centers, one located in Ilobasco and another currently under construction in Metapán.

== History ==
The university was originally founded with the name Universidad Católica de Occidente (UNICO) by the former bishop of Santa Ana Marco René Revelo Contreras and approved to be a Catholic University by Pope John Paul II though the Congregation for Catholic Education on December 18, 1982, and authorized by the Ministry of Education

The first campus of the university was located in the John XXIII Seminar named after Pope John XXIII, located in the center of Santa Ana and grow out to the outskirts of town in 1995. The original size of the campus was 17 manzana it was later expanded to 42 manzana. In 2002 the university opened the Ilobasco Regional Center (CRI)

== Faculties ==
The Catholic University of El Salvador has four faculties on the central campus of Santa Ana, and a multidisciplinary one at the Ilobasco Regional Center:

Santa Ana Central Campus

- Faculty of Sciences and Humanities
- Faculty of Business Sciences
- Faculty of Engineering and Architecture,
- Faculty of Health Sciences.

Ilobasco Regional Center

Multidisciplinary Faculty of the CRI.
