= José Elías Rauda Gutiérrez =

Salvadorian Catholic bishop (born 1962)

José Elías Rauda Gutiérrez O.F.M.
- Bishop of San Vicente
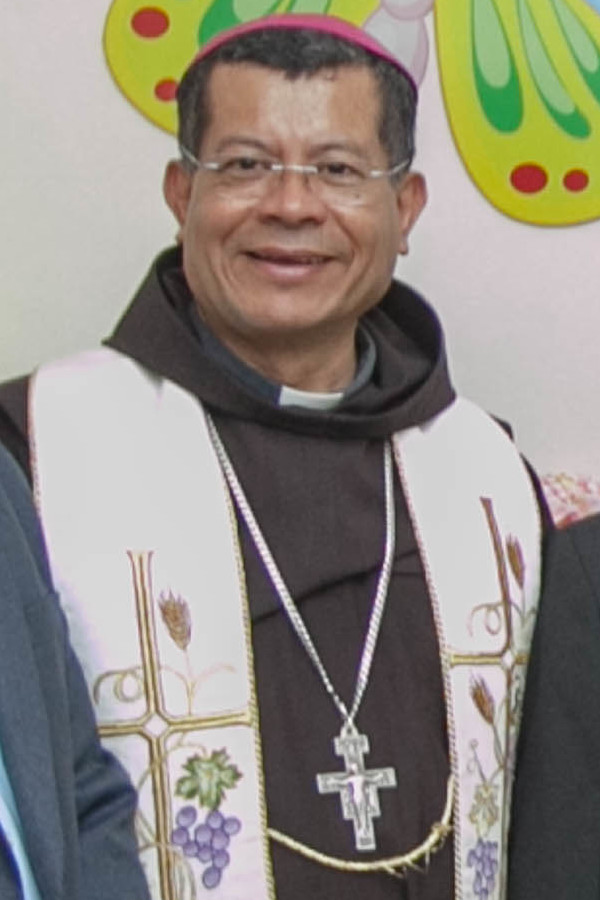
- Rauda Gutiérrez in 2017
- Church: Catholic Church
- Diocese: San Vicente
- In office: 2009 –
- Predecessor: José Luis Escobar Alas
- Previous posts: Auxiliary Bishop of Santa Ana (2008–2009); Titular Bishop of Foratiana (2008–2009)

Orders
- Ordination: 22 May 1988
- Consecration: 9 September 2006 by Luigi Pezzuto
- Rank: Archbishop

Personal details
- Born: 20 July 1962 (age 63) Agua Caliente, El Salvador

José Elías Rauda Gutiérrez O.F.M. (born 20 July 1962) is a Salvadoran Roman Catholic bishop, being the bishop of the Diocese of San Vicente since 2009. He was previously the auxiliary bishop of Santa Ana and titular bishop of Foratiana from 2008 to 2009.

== Biography ==
Rauda Gutiérrez was born in Agua Caliente, El Salvador, in 1962. He joined the Order of Friars Minor in his teens, and took his solemn vows on 28 February 1987. On 1 April 1989 he was ordained a priest. On 25 January 2008 it was announced that Rauda Gutiérrez had been appointed by Pope Benedict XVI as the auxiliary bishop for the Roman Catholic Diocese of Santa Ana and titular bishop of Foratiana. He was ordained a bishop on 19 April 2008 by Luigi Pezzuto. On 12 December 2009 it was announced that Rauda Gutiérrez would be the new bishop of San Vicente, succeeding José Luis Escobar Alas who had been appointed as the new archbishop of San Salvador.

As bishop, Rauda Gutiérrez has maintained close ties to the Salvadoran American community, visiting the United States on multiple occasions.

In 2018 Rauda Gutiérrez caused some controversy when he led a prayer at a meeting of the conservative party ARENA. Rauda Gutiérrez later said that he had been invited to give a prayer by the party president, and that he was not formally endorsing the political party.
