= Cathedral of Santa Ana =

Cathedral of Santa Ana may refer to:

- Cathedral of Santa Ana (Canary Islands)
- Cathedral of Santa Ana (El Salvador)
