= Diocese of Santiago =

Diocese or Archdiocese of Santiago may refer to the following (former and/or present) ecclesiastical jurisdictions — bishoprics or archbishoprics — with see in a city called Santiago (after Saint James, in Spanish):

== Africa ==
- Roman Catholic Diocese of Santiago de Cabo Verde on Cape Verde

== America ==
- Anglican Diocese of Santiago in Chile
- Roman Catholic Archdiocese of Santiago de Chile in Chile
- Roman Catholic Archdiocese of Santiago de Cuba on Cuba
- Roman Catholic Archdiocese of Santiago de los Caballeros on Hispaniola, in the Dominican Republic
- Roman Catholic Diocese of Santiago del Estero in Argentina
- Roman Catholic Diocese of Santiago de María in El Salvador
- Roman Catholic Diocese of Santiago de Veraguas in Panama

== Asia ==
- Diocese of Santiago; see Episcopal Church in the Philippines#Dioceses
- Diocese of Santiago (Philippine Independent Church); see List of dioceses of the Philippine Independent Church

== Europe ==
- Roman Catholic Archdiocese of Santiago de Compostela in Galicia, Spain
