= Diocese of San Vicente =

Roman Catholic diocese in El Salvador

Diocese of San Vicente Dioecesis Sancti Vincentii
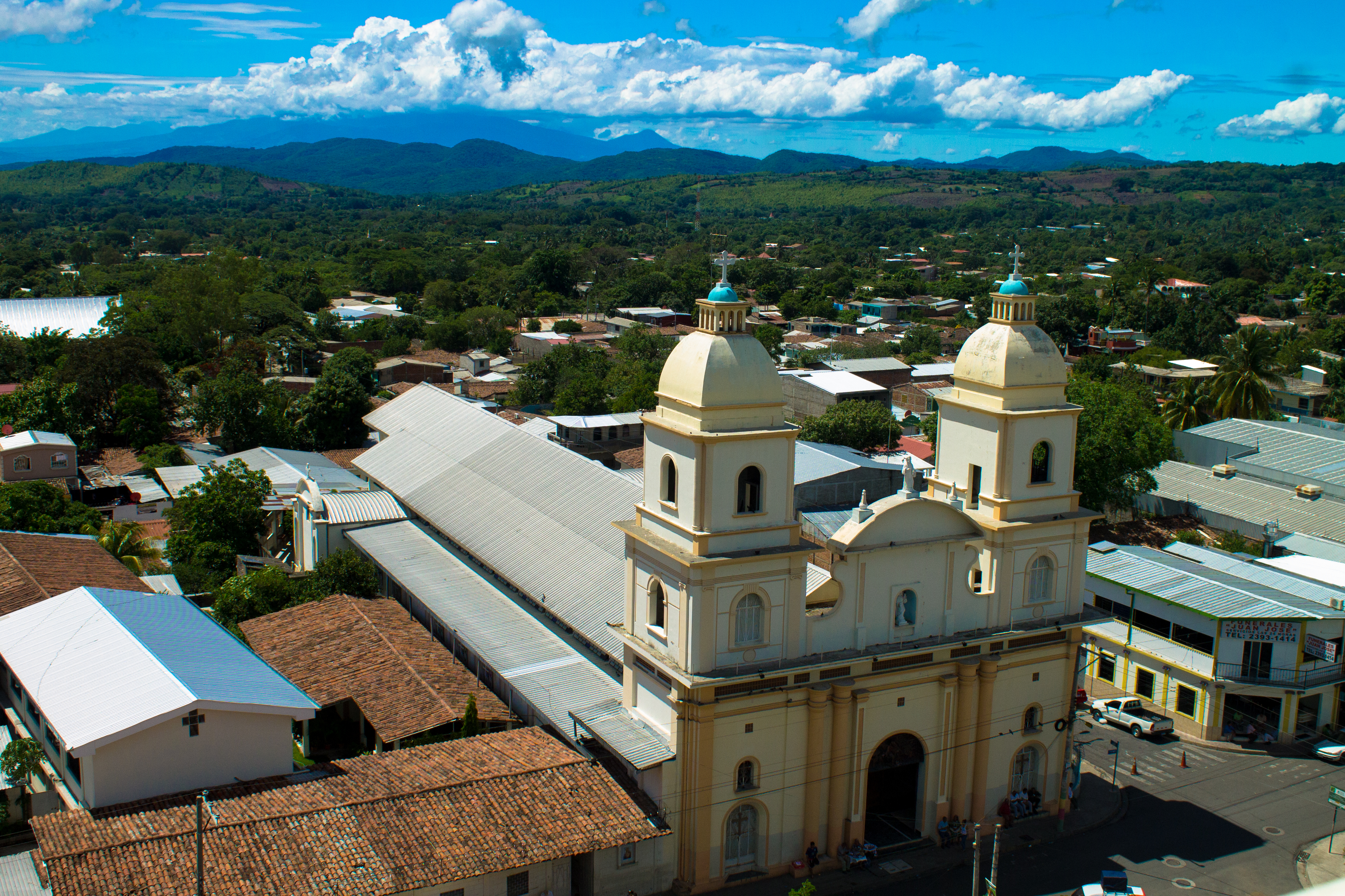
- Cathedral

Location
- Country: El Salvador
- Ecclesiastical province: Province of San Salvador
- Metropolitan: José Luis Escobar Alas

Statistics
- Area: 4,993 km^{2} (1,928 sq mi)
- Population: Total; Catholics: (as of 2010); 508,000; 467,779 (92.1%)
- Parishes: 35

Information
- Denomination: Catholic Church
- Sui iuris church: Latin Church
- Rite: Roman Rite
- Established: 18 December 1943 (81 years ago)
- Cathedral: Cathedral of St. Vincent

Current leadership
- Pope: Leo XIV
- Bishop: José Elías Rauda Gutiérrez, O.F.M.
- Bishops emeritus: José Oscar Barahona Castillo

Map
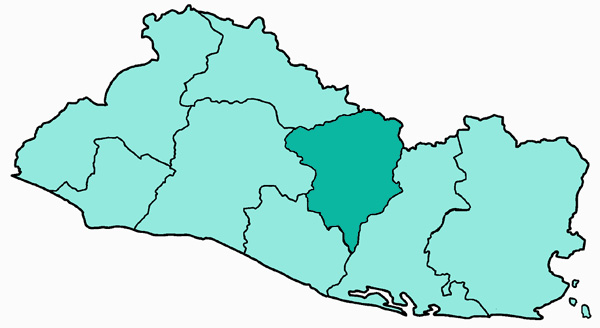

The Diocese of San Vicente (Latin: Dioecesis Sancti Vincentii) is a Latin Church ecclesiastical territory or diocese of the Catholic Church in El Salvador. It is a suffragan diocese in the ecclesiastical province of the metropolitan Archdiocese of San Salvador. The Diocese of San Vicente was erected on 18 December 1943.

== Bishops ==
=== Ordinaries ===
- Pedro Arnoldo Aparicio y Quintanilla, S.D.B. (1948–1983)
- José Oscar Barahona Castillo (1983–2005)
- José Luis Escobar Alas (2005–2008), appointed Archbishop of San Salvador
- José Elías Rauda Gutiérrez, O.F.M. (since 2009)

=== Auxiliary bishops ===
- José Oscar Barahona Castillo (1982–1983), appointed bishop here
- José Luis Escobar Alas (2002–2005), appointed bishop here

=== Other priests of this diocese who became bishops ===
- Fabio Reynaldo Colindres Abarca, appointed Bishop of the Military Ordinariate of El Salvador in 2008
- Constantino Barrera Morales, appointed Bishop of Sonsonate in 2012

== Territorial losses ==
Year	To form
1987	Diocese of Zacatecoluca

== External links and references ==
- "Diocese of San Vicente". Catholic-Hierarchy.
