= Cathedral of San Salvador =

Cathedral of San Salvador may refer to:

- Cathedral of San Salvador, Oviedo, Spain
- Cathedral of San Salvador (Zaragoza), Spain
- San Salvador Cathedral, San Salvador
