= Elías Samuel Bolaños Avelar =

Salvadoran Catholic bishop (born 1951)

His Excellency, The Most Reverend Elías Samuel Bolaños Avelar SDB
- Bishop Emeritus of Zacatecoluca
- Church: Catholic Church
- Diocese: Zacatecoluca
- Installed: 27 February 1998
- Term ended: 6 July 2026
- Predecessor: Romeo Tovar Astorga
- Successor: Ramiro Ernesto Landaverde Orellana

Orders
- Ordination: 27 October 1979
- Consecration: 25 March 1998 by Miguel Obando y Bravo

Personal details
- Born: 16 February 1951 (age 75) Cutumay, Santa Ana Department, El Salvador

Elías Samuel Bolaños Avelar SDB (born 16 February 1951) is a Salvadoran Catholic prelate who served as Bishop of Zacatecoluca from 1998 to 2026.

== Early life and religious vocation ==
Bolaños Avelar was born on 16 February 1951 in Cutumay, El Salvador. He entered the Salesians of Don Bosco in 1969, after completed his secondary education at the Salesian Institute Rinaldi, located in Los Planes de Renderos. Subsequently, It was there, on 10 January 1970, that he made his first religious profession and later went to Guatemala, where he studied philosophy and theology between 1970 and 1979 at the Salesian Philosophical and Theological Institutes, before being ordained a priest on 27 October 1979.

== Episcopal ministry ==
On 27 February 1998, Pope John Paul II appointed Bolaños Avelar Bishop of Zacatecoluca. He received episcopal consecration on 25 March 1998. The principal consecrator was Cardinal Miguel Obando y Bravo, with Archbishop Fernando Sáenz Lacalle and Bishop Romeo Tovar Astorga serving as co-consecrators.

As bishop, Bolaños Avelar oversaw the pastoral life of the Diocese of Zacatecoluca for more than twenty-eight years. In 2025, he marked the fiftieth anniversary of his religious profession and priestly ministry, reflecting on his vocation and episcopal service in an interview published by the Salesian Bulletin.

On 6 July 2026, Pope Leo XIV accepted his resignation from the pastoral governance of the Diocese of Zacatecoluca upon reaching the canonical retirement age. On the same day, Father Ramiro Ernesto Landaverde Orellana was appointed as his successor.
