= Rauda (disambiguation) =

Rauda is a municipality in the district Saale-Holzland, in Thuringia, Germany.

Rauda may also refer to:

- Rauda Morcos, Palestinian Israeli lesbian poet and LGBTIQ activist
- José Elías Rauda Gutiérrez, Salvadorian Roman Catholic bishop
- Rauda (river), river in Lithuania and Latvia
- Rauda (Šēdere), village in Latvia
