= Parque Libertad (Santa Ana, El Salvador) =

Historic town square

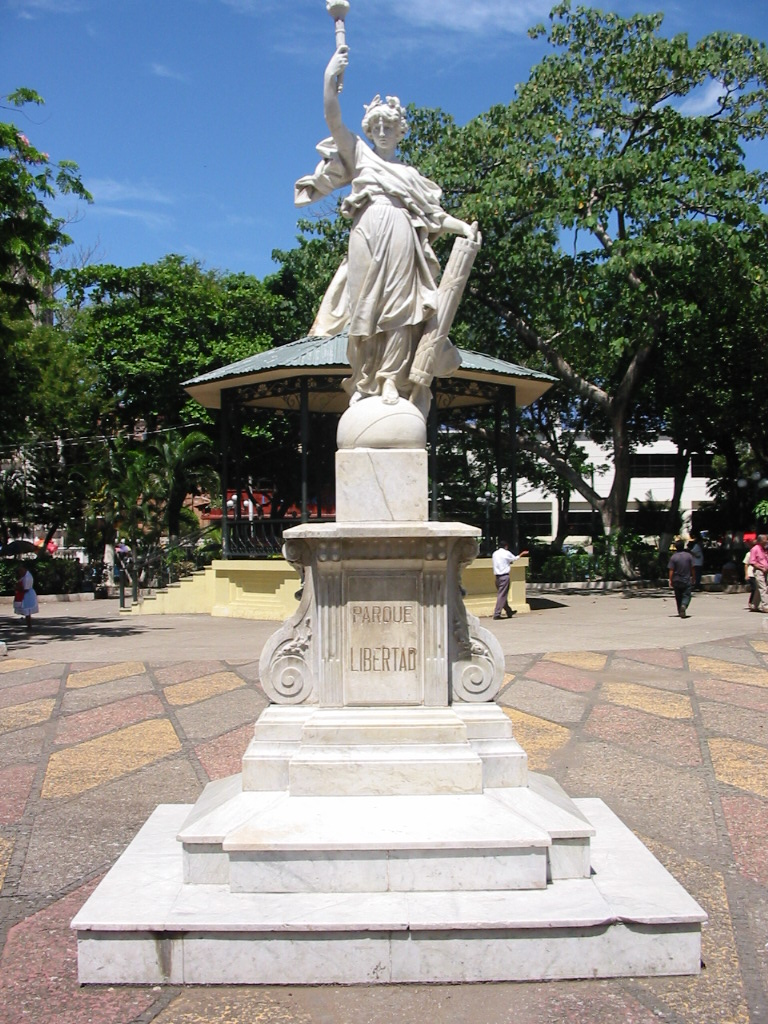
"Monumento a la Libertad" situated in the park.

The Parque Libertad (In English: Liberty Park) is the main square of the Salvadoran city of Santa Ana. Situated in the center of the city, it is surrounded by historic buildings including: the National Theater, the City Hall, the Cathedral and by other important structures like the "Casino Santaneco" and the "Centro de Artes de Occidente".

== History ==
The Parque Libertad was built by the Spaniards as the central square during the city's colonial period. It was the central market of the city and served as a space for political events, shelter for villagers, festivities, autos de fé of the Inquisition, and public executions. It became the main space for locals and the setting of social conflicts such as uprisings and invasions.

On June 8, 1886, president Francisco Menéndez declared that a park was to be built in the Central Square. The city market continued to be situated in the square until 1890 when the Central Market was built.
