= Santa Ana Cathedral, El Salvador =

Coordinates: 13.9947°N 89.5556°W

Santa Ana Cathedral
- Cathedral of Our Lady Saint Anne
- Catedral de la Señora Santa Ana
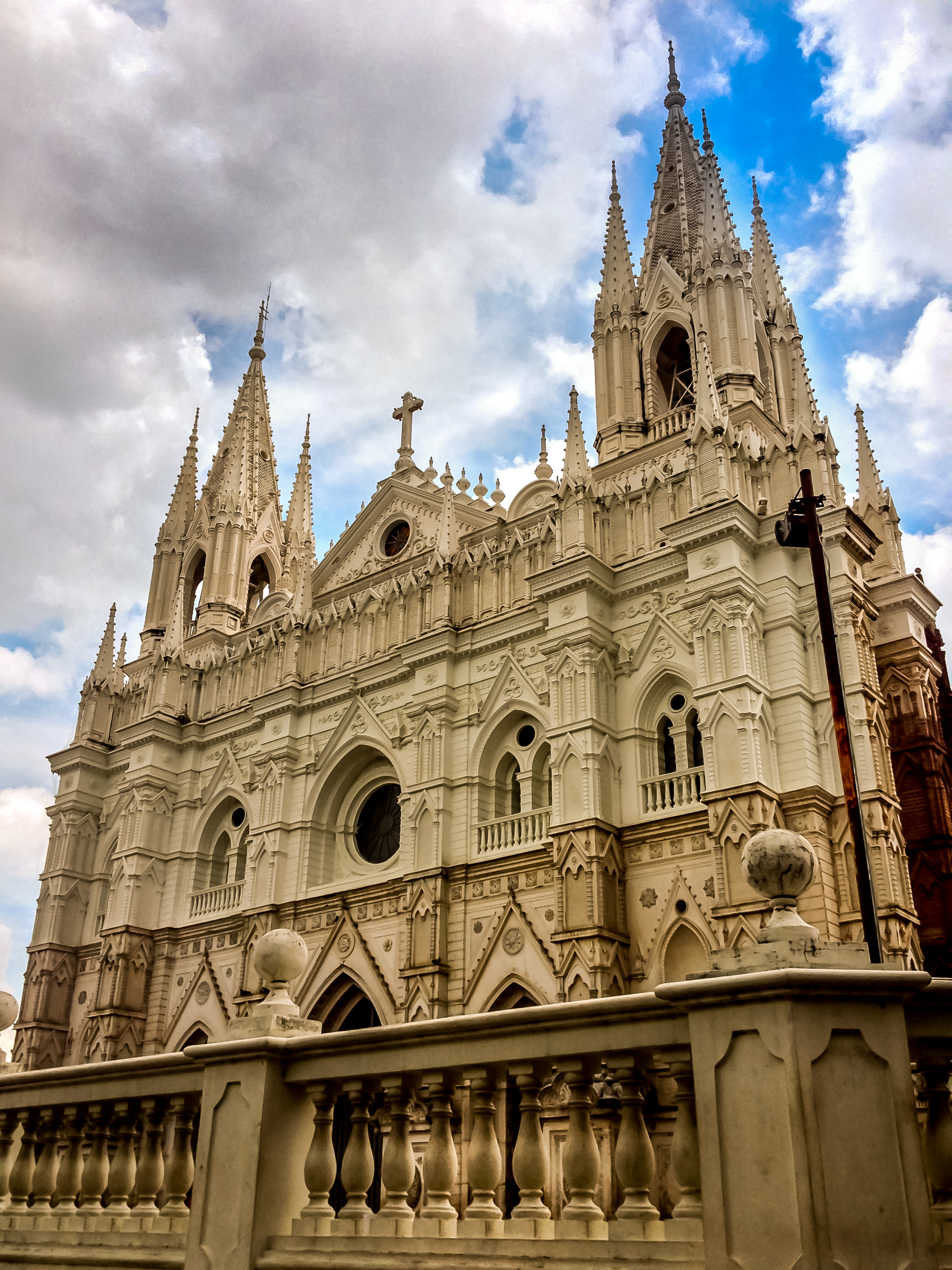
- Santa Ana Cathedral
- Location: Santa Ana, El Salvador
- Address: 1a Avenida Sur, Santa Ana, El Salvador
- Country: El Salvador
- Denomination: Catholicism

History
- Consecrated: February 11, 1913

Architecture
- Style: Neo-Gothic
- Completed: April 22, 1957

Administration
- Archdiocese: San Salvador
- Diocese: Santa Ana

Clergy
- Bishop: Miguel Ángel Morán Aquino

The Cathedral of Our Lady Saint Anne (Spanish: Catedral de la Señora Santa Ana), is a neo-Gothic cathedral located next to Parque Libertad in Santa Ana, El Salvador.

== History ==
The original site of the Cathedral was the central parish, which was built between 1575 and 1576. It was destroyed by lightning in the 19th century. When the Diocese of Santa Ana was created, preparations were made to rebuild the central parish; this reconstruction was authorized in 1904 and began on January 21, 1906. It was consecrated on February 11, 1913.

Construction continued in the following decades until finally completed on February 24, 1959 when the marble altar of the image of Saint Anne was consecrated and finished. On April 22, 1995 was declared a National Monument.

== Design ==
The building was designed as a Neo-Gothic cathedral, in contrast to the Spanish colonial style of most of the cathedrals in El Salvador and the rest of Latin America. It is formed by three naves, which are of the following measures: the central nave with 22 meters in length and 22 meters in width, the lateral naves measure 2 meters in length and eight meters in width; together the three naves form a cross.

The north tower offers three bells that are activated manually, while the south tower contains three bells that were brought from the Netherlands in 1949 and activated electronically.

The Cathedral of Santa Ana has a total of 28 paintings and statues, 4 confessionals, 118 pews and 51 lamps.
