= Diocese of San Miguel (El Salvador) =

Roman Catholic diocese in El Salvador

Diocese of San Miguel Dioecesis Sancti Michaelis
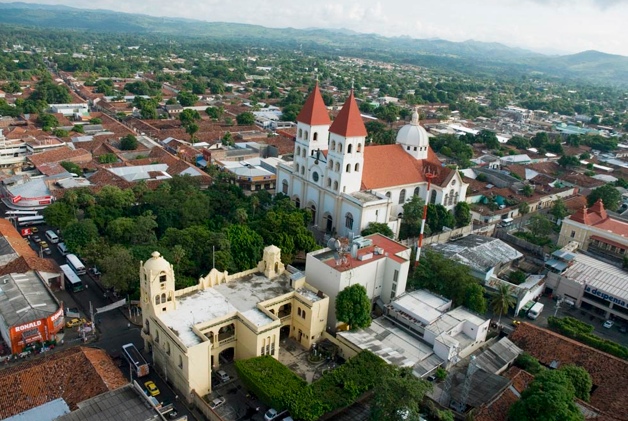
- Catedral-Basílica Reina de la Paz

Location
- Country: El Salvador
- Ecclesiastical province: Province of San Salvador
- Metropolitan: José Luis Escobar Alas
- Coordinates: 13°28'58.570"N, 88°10'29.100"W

Statistics
- Area: 4,993 km^{2} (1,928 sq mi)
- Population: Total; Catholics: (as of 2014); 1,253,100; 871,500 (69.5%)
- Parishes: 47

Information
- Denomination: Catholic Church
- Sui iuris church: Latin Church
- Rite: Roman Rite
- Established: 11 February 1913 (112 years ago)
- Cathedral: Cathedral-Basilica of Queen of Peace
- Secular priests: 70

Current leadership
- Pope: Leo XIV
- Bishop: Fabio Reynaldo Colindres Abarca

Map
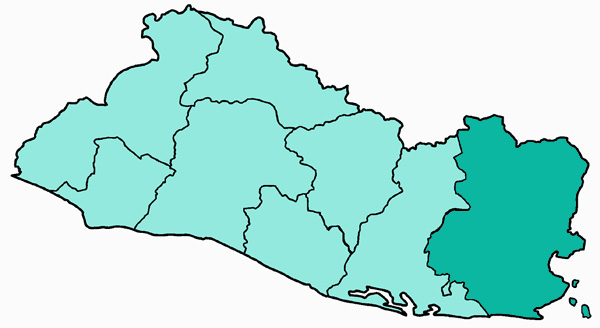

The Diocese of San Miguel (Latin: Dioecesis Sancti Michaelis) is a Latin Church ecclesiastical territory or diocese of the Catholic Church in El Salvador. It is a suffragan diocese in the ecclesiastical province of the metropolitan Archdiocese of San Salvador. The Diocese of San Miguel was erected on 11 February 1913.

== Bishops ==
=== Ordinaries ===
- Juan Antonio Dueñas y Argumedo (1913–1941)
- Miguel Angel Machado y Escobar (1942–1968)
- Lorenzo Michele Joseph Graziano, O.F.M. (1968–1969)
- José Eduardo Alvarez Ramírez, C.M. (1969–1997)
- Romeo Tovar Astorga, O.F.M. (1997–1999), appointed Bishop of Santa Ana
- Miguel Angel Morán Aquino (2000–2016), appointed Bishop of Santa Ana
- Fabio Reynaldo Colindres Abarca (2017–present)

=== Coadjutor bishops ===
- Lorenzo Michele Joseph Graziano, O.F.M. (1965–1968)
- Romeo Tovar Astorga, O.F.M. (1996–1997)

=== Other priest of this diocese who became bishop ===
- Gregorio Rosa Chávez, appointed Auxiliary Bishop of San Salvador in 1982, cardinal in 2017

== Territorial losses ==
Year	Along with	To form
1954		Diocese of Santiago de María
