= José Adolfo Mojica Morales =

Salvadoran Roman Catholic bishop

- Bishop of Sonsonate
- Church: Catholic Church
- Diocese: Diocese of Sonsonate
- In office: 18 November 1989 – 8 October 2011
- Predecessor: José Carmen Di Pietro Pésolo
- Successor: Constantino Barrera Morales

Orders
- Ordination: 25 October 1964
- Consecration: 20 January 1990 by Francesco De Nittis

Personal details
- Born: 25 September 1936 Nancintepeque, Santa Ana Department, El Salvador
- Died: 2 March 2012 (aged 75)

José Adolfo Mojica Morales (September 26, 1936 – March 2, 2012) was the Roman Catholic bishop of the Roman Catholic Diocese of Sonsonate, El Salvador.

Ordained to the priesthood in 1964, Mojica Morales became bishop in 1989, retiring in 2011.
