= Antonio Adolfo Pérez y Aguilar =

Salvadoran Roman Catholic bishop (1839–1926)

- Archbishop of San Salvador
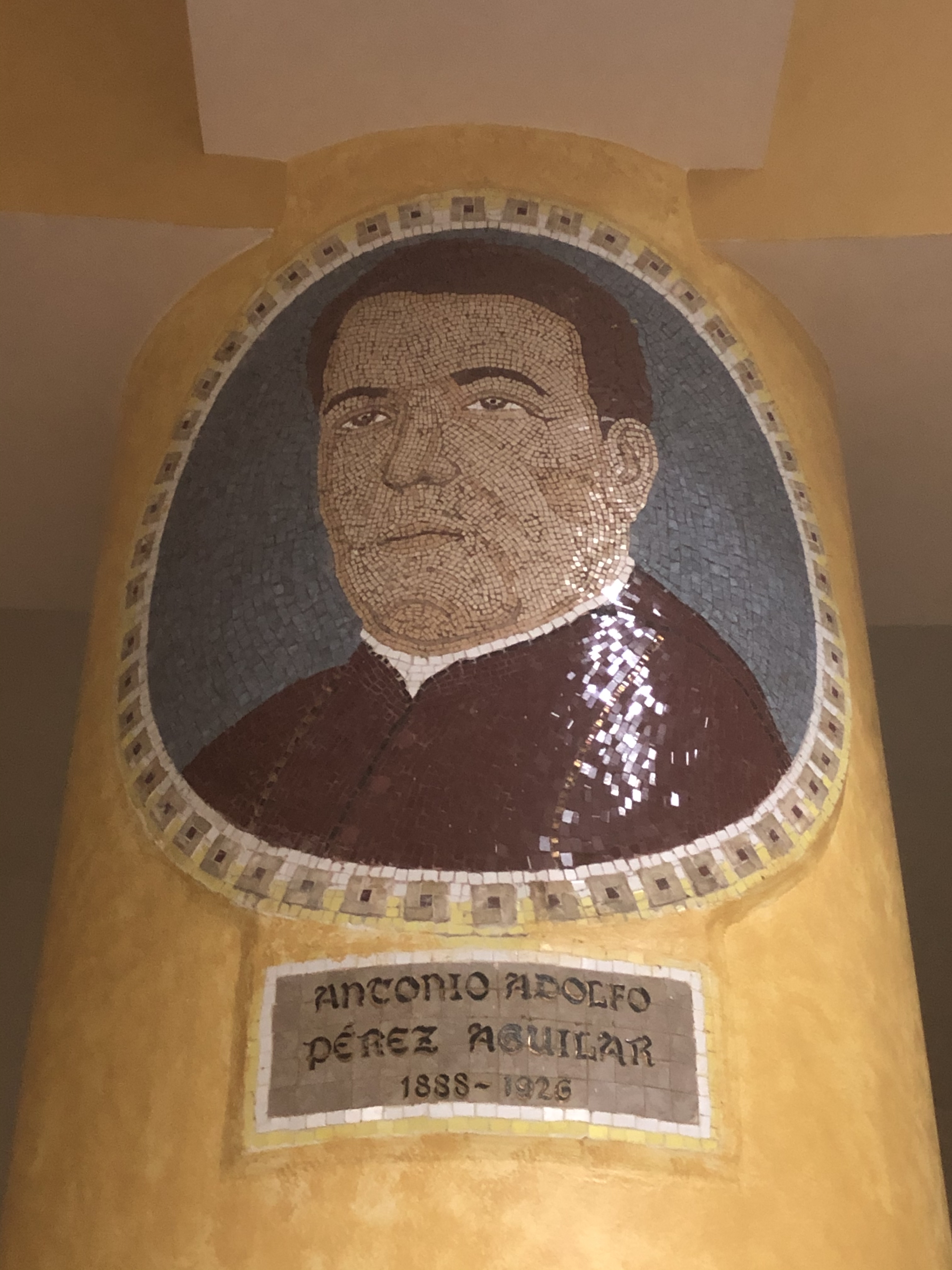
- Church: Catholic Church
- Archdiocese: Archdiocese of San Salvador
- In office: 13 January 1888 – 17 April 1926
- Predecessor: José Luis Cárcamo y Rodríguez
- Successor: José Alfonso Belloso y Sánchez

Orders
- Ordination: 21 March 1863
- Consecration: 29 June 1888 by Manuel Francisco Vélez

Personal details
- Born: 20 March 1839 San Salvador, Federal District, Federal Republic of Central America
- Died: 17 April 1926 (aged 87)

Msgr. Dr. Antonio Adolfo Pérez y Aguilar (20 March 1839 – 17 April 1926) was the fourth Bishop and first Archbishop of San Salvador, El Salvador.

Preceded by Antonio Adolfo Pérez y Aguilar (as bishop)	Archbishop of San Salvador; 1913-1926	Succeeded by José Alfonso Belloso y Sánchez
