= Luis Chávez y González =

Salvadoran bishop

Servant of God Luis Chávez
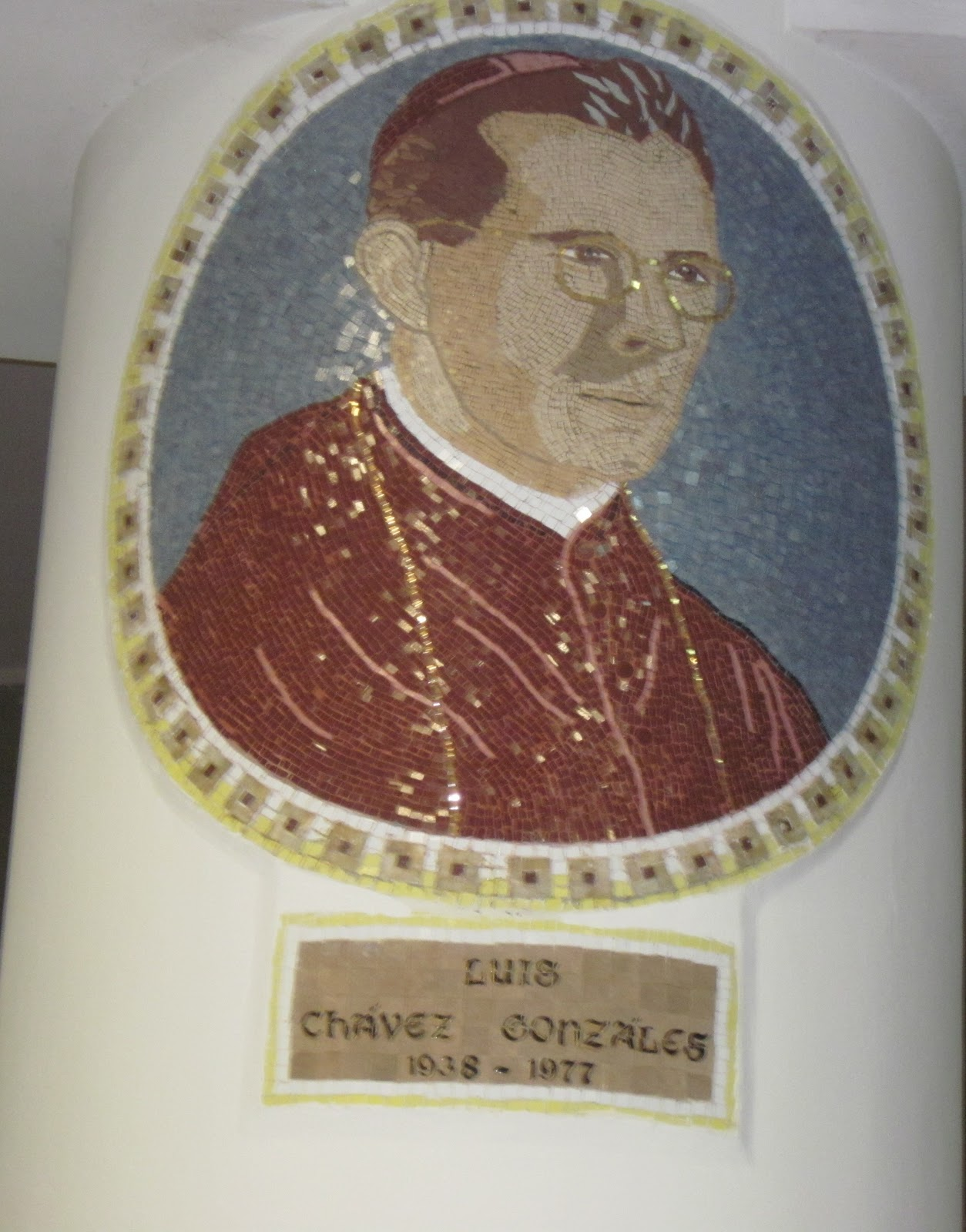
- Archdiocese: Archdiocese of San Salvador
- Installed: 12 December 1938
- Term ended: 3 February 1977
- Predecessor: José Alfonso Belloso y Sánchez
- Successor: Óscar Romero

Orders
- Ordination: 16 November 1924
- Consecration: 12 December 1938 by Juan Antonio Dueñas y Argumedo

Personal details
- Born: 24 April 1901 El Rosario, El Salvador
- Died: 27 March 1987 (aged 85)

Styles of Luis Chávez
- Reference style: The Most Reverend
- Spoken style: Your Excellency
- Religious style: Monsignor
- Posthumous style: Servant of God

Luis Chávez y González (1901–1987) was the seventh Bishop and third Archbishop of San Salvador, El Salvador, and immediate predecessor of Archbishop Óscar Romero. Unlike Romero, who served for three years before being assassinated in 1980, Chávez had an archbishopric that was long and low key. Chávez was Archbishop of San Salvador for 38 years (1938–1977), longer than any other Salvadoran bishop. Like his more famous successor, Chávez is also a candidate for sainthood. His beatification process was started in June 2001.

== Biography ==
Chávez was born on April 24, 1901, in El Rosario, El Salvador in the Cuscatlán Department. Chávez and Pío Romero Bosque, a future president of El Salvador, were both students of a distinguished Salvadoran master, Néstor Salamanca, in Suchitoto, where Chávez would spend his latter years. He was ordained a priest at the age of 23, on November 16, 1924. He was parish priest in Ilobasco, San Juan Cojutepeque and the historic La Merced church in San Salvador. Fourteen years later, he was appointed Archbishop of San Salvador at the youthful age of 37. He was named on September 1, and consecrated on December 12, 1938, and would reign until his resignation on February 3, 1977. Chávez was an influential bishop in the region, making pastoral travels to neighboring sees, such as Matagalpa, Nicaragua, which he visited in 1942. That same year, Chávez organized a eucharistic congress to celebrate the first centennial of the San Salvador archdiocese. He also established a Central American Bishops' Conference. In 1945, Chávez authorized veneration of the Child Jesus of Bethlehem image that reportedly appeared at the beach in Acajutla, in Sonsonate, El Salvador.

Chávez had a conservative bent, inviting Opus Dei to establish bases in El Salvador. He approved the creation of a cinematic censorship office in 1963. Chávez also signed a bishops' letter warning against the dangers of Communism. But, Chávez was a prolific writer, and his 52 pastoral letters also included some that established a tradition of social justice in the archdiocese. In August 1966, he published an influential pastoral letter, "The responsibility of the layperson in the temporal order," which highlighted the Church's obligation to denounce injustice, the specific grievances of the Salvadoran people, and the attribution to those grievances to the accumulation of wealth in the hands of the few.

As archbishop, Chávez encouraged vocations, building the principal seminary in San Salvador, San José de la Montaña. He recruited Rutilio Grande into the priesthood and supported Jose Inocencio Alas who helped to introduce Liberation Theology to the country. He was said to have been deeply influenced by the Second Vatican Council, implementing its progressive reforms in pastoral work throughout his archdiocese. Chávez is said to have attended every session of the Council, and was a member of its Central Planning Commission. He established an institute to teach the Social Doctrine of the Church, and sent priests to study abroad. Some of these priests came from rural families, not the urban middle class, and could have been more sympathetic to the peasant poor. Chávez encouraged peasant cooperatives as alternatives to agricultural sector expansion in the 1950s. He also sent priests to Canada to study the organization and function of peasants cooperatives. Similar communitarian activities were later advocated by the Salvadoran Christian Democratic Party (Partido Democrata Cristiano or PDC). In 1970, Oscar Romero, Chávez' eventual successor, was named auxiliary bishop of San Salvador—Chávez' second in command—but Romero was said to be cool to Chávez' reformist agenda, and was transferred out of the archdiocese in 1974. Chávez' new auxiliary would be Arturo Rivera y Damas, who would later also be archbishop.

Chávez maintained largely cordial relations with the government, as typified by his blessing the legislative palace in March 1973. Because of his long tenure, he had a hand in many institutions of Salvadoran Catholicism: he inaugurated the famous Savior of the World Monument at Plaza de Las Americas in western San Salvador; he presided over the reconstruction of the San Salvador Cathedral after the Old Cathedral burned in a fire in August 1951, and he established a cult to the Virgin of Fatima in El Salvador.

Chávez resigned as archbishop in 1977, the year he entered the mandatory retirement age for bishops, 75. Later that same year, his sister, Carmen Chávez de Hernández, died. After leaving the archdiocese, Chávez volunteered to work as parish priest of Suchitoto. Archbishop Romero told the story of the elderly Chávez volunteering for the job:

Our beloved predecessor, Monsignor Luis Chavez y Gonzalez, at his 75, almost 76, years of age, tells me that he is available and proposes to go work in Suchitoto. "Whatever you please, Monsignor, your gesture touches me," I tell him. "Then, I will make my Profession of Faith," he says. "But, Monsignor, no one is going to doubt your faith!" - "No," he says, "this is mandatory." And rising to his feet before the Crucifix on my desk he prays with the humility of the most humble Christian, "I believe in God, the Father Almighty, I believe in the Church..." And after saying the Creed, he says to me, "I swear allegiance to my superior." Brothers and sisters, who was superior there? I felt so small before that marvelous example!

In May 1978, Chávez' work was acknowledged by an act of the Salvadoran legislature, which awarded him a special citation. Chávez died on March 27, 1987, as Archbishop Emeritus of San Salvador. In June 2001, the San Salvador archdiocese instituted a beatification process for Chávez. It was spearheaded by the same cleric who headed the diocesan investigation of the canonization cause for Archbishop Romero. In February 1996, Pope John Paul II may have bolstered the prospects of Chávez' sainthood when he called the prelate a "model of virtues" when he visited the Metropolitan Cathedral of the Holy Savior (Catedral Metropolitana de San Salvador) where Chávez is buried. He added, referring to Chávez' and his two successors, "I am sure that they intercede for the Church that they loved and served until the end of their days, and whom they leave a particularly eloquent message."

== Quotations ==
"The people of El Salvador are highly dedicated to work, and I would thank those who are responsible for maintaining peace and order if they would give these people the opportunity to emerge from the poverty in which they find themselves to a state more worthy of a human being."

"Do you want to be a priest?" (to Rutilio Grande, later an assassinated cleric).

== Footnotes ==
Catholic Church titles
| Preceded by José Alfonso Belloso y Sánchez | Archbishop of San Salvador; 1938-1977 | Succeeded by Óscar Arnulfo Romero y Galdámez |
