= José Alfonso Belloso y Sánchez =

Salvadoran bishop

- Archbishop of San Salvador
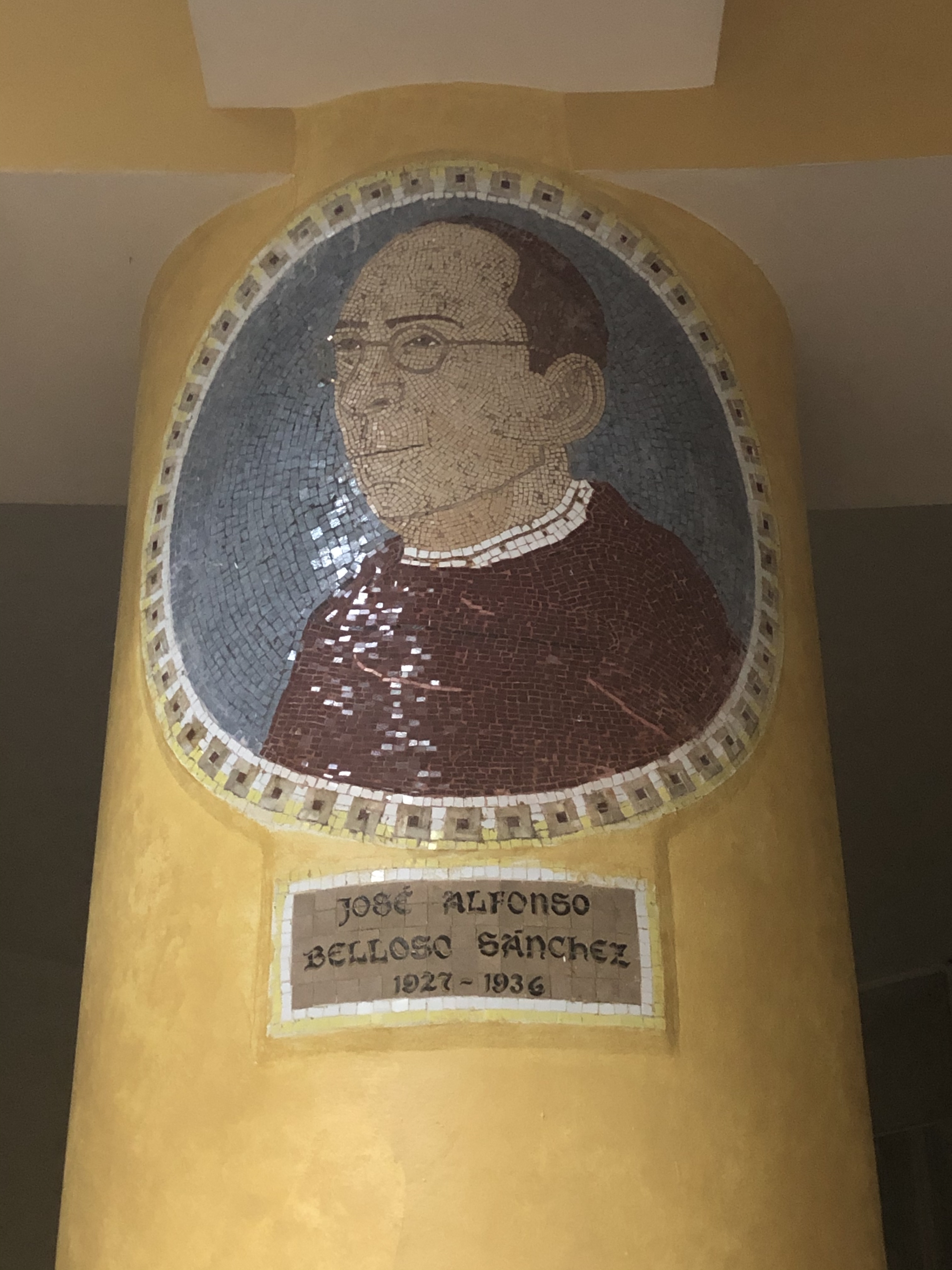
- Icon of José Alfonso Belloso y Sánchez
- Church: Catholic Church
- Archdiocese: Archdiocese of San Salvador
- In office: 22 December 1927 – 9 August 1938
- Predecessor: Antonio Adolfo Pérez y Aguilar
- Successor: Luis Chávez y González
- Previous posts: Titular Bishop of Sozusa in Palaestina (1919-1927); Auxiliary Bishop of San Salvador (1919-1927)

Orders
- Ordination: 18 December 1897
- Consecration: 30 May 1920 by Claudio María Volio y Jiménez

Personal details
- Born: 30 October 1873 San Salvador, El Salvador
- Died: 9 August 1938 (aged 64)

Msgr. Dr. José Alfonso Belloso y Sánchez (30 October 1873 – 9 August 1938) was the sixth Bishop and second Archbishop of San Salvador, El Salvador.

| Preceded by Antonio Adolfo Pérez y Aguilar | Archbishop of San Salvador; 1927-1938 | Succeeded by Luis Chávez y González |
