= Foratiana =

Africa Proconsularis (125 CE)

Foratiana was an ancient Roman-Berber city in the province of Byzacena and Africa Proconsularis in the Sahel region of Tunisia.

The civitas was also the seat of an ancient Christian diocese. It survives today as a titular see of the Roman Catholic Church, suffran to Carthage. Known Bishops include:

- Bishop Bonifice
- John William Comber 1959–1998
- Alberto Bottari de Castello 1999–2007
- José Elías Rauda Gutiérrez (El Salvador) 2008–2009
- Bosco Puthur (India) 2010–2014
- Mar Bawai Soro 2014
