= Alejandro Bracho =

Mexican actor

- Born: June 11, 1955 (age 71); Mexico City, Mexico
- Occupation: Actor
- Years active: 1986-present

Alejandro Bracho (born June 11, 1955) is a Mexican actor.

He starred in the 1989 James Bond film Licence to Kill as Perez, a henchman of the drug baron Franz Sanchez. Bracho also starred opposite Raul Julia as Father Alfonso Ozuna, a Jesuit priest, in Romero [1988]. Other film credits in English include The Blue Iguana, Clear and Present Danger, Highway Patrolman and Barbarian Queen II. He appeared in approximately half a dozen Spanish-language films, including El Otro, Extraños Caminos, Cinco de Mayo la Batalla (2013, acting mostly in English), 'Mesa de Regalos' as well as a recurring role in two seasons of the Netflix series 'Narcos México'. He jumped to stardom on Mexican television with his hilarious portrayal of the bisexual villain Emilio Uriarte in the comedic telenovela Los Sanchez. Bracho currently resides in Mexico City, where he is an acting for film teacher and occasionally acts in selected projects.

== Filmography ==
Year	Title	Role	Notes
1986	Miracles	Bank Robber #1	
1986	El otro		
1987	Asalto cotidiano		
1988	Deathstalker and the Warriors from Hell	Dead Warrior	
1988	The Blue Iguana	Hotel Clerk	
1989	Licence to Kill	Perez	
1989	Romero	Father Alfonzo Osuña	
1990	Sandino	Sócrates Sandino	
1991	El Patrullero	Sospechoso #2	
1992	The Harvest	Kind Eyes	
1993	The Wrong Man	Lieutenant	
1993	Extraños caminos		
1994	Clear and Present Danger	Fernandez	
1995	Bésame en la boca	Doctor	
1998	The Other Conquest	Alférez Pedro	
2007	The Zone	Ismael	
2018–2021	Narcos: Mexico	Mr. X	Recurring role
