= Benjamin Barrera y Reyes =

Salvadoran bishop (1902–1999)

Benjamin Barrera y Reyes M.I.
- Bishop of Santa Ana
- Archdiocese: San Salvador
- Diocese: Santa Ana
- Installed: March 1, 1954
- Term ended: February 25, 1981
- Predecessor: Giacomo Richardo Vilanova y Meléndez
- Successor: Marco René Revelo Contreras
- Previous post: Auxiliary Bishop (1942-1954) Titular Bishop (1942-1954) Diocese Bishop (1954-1981)

Orders
- Rank: Diocesan Bishop

Personal details
- Born: December 8, 1902 Sensuntepeque, Cabañas, El Salvador
- Died: February 4, 1999 (aged 96) Santa Ana, El Salvador
- Denomination: Catholicism

Benjamín Barrera y Reyes (December 28, 1902 – February 4, 1999) was a salvadoran bishop, born in the city of Sensuntepeque in the Cabañas Department

Appointed in 1942 by Pope Pius XII Auxiliary Bishop of Santa Ana, became its bishop in 1954. He resigned on February 25, 1981.

He took part in all four sessions of the Second Vatican Council.
