= Miguel Ángel Morán Aquino =

Salvadoran Catholic bishop

Miguel Angel Morán Aquino The Most Reverend
- Bishop of Santa Ana
- Church: Catholic Church
- Archdiocese: Archdiocese of San Salvador
- Diocese: Roman Catholic Diocese of Santa Ana
- See: Santa Ana
- Predecessor: Romeo Tovar Astorga O.F.M.
- Previous posts: Catholic priest in Santa Ana (1981-2021); Bishop of San Miguel (2000-2016); Bishop of Santa Ana (2016-present)

Orders
- Ordination: December 5, 1981 by Marco René Revelo Contreras
- Consecration: September 2, 2000 by Giacinto Berloco
- Rank: Diocesan Bishop

Personal details
- Born: May 25, 1955 (age 71) Santa Ana, El Salvador
- Denomination: Catholic Church
- Education: Catholic University of El Salvador

Mons. Miguel Ángel Morán Aquino (born 25 May 1955) is a Salvadoran Catholic bishop.

== Early life ==
Morán was born on May 25, 1955 in the small municipality of Nancintepeque in the city of Santa Ana and at age 14 he started to form his priesthood by going to a minor seminary

== Biography ==
In July 25, 1981 Morán received the order of diaconate in the Santa Ana Cathedral and on December 5, 1981 Morán was ordained as a priest by Marco René Revelo Contreras in the church Iglesia de San Pedro (Metapán) in Metapán.

Morán went to Rome to study dogmatic theology and after his return to El Salvador he became a pastor at the school "San José de la Montaña Seminary" from 1986 to 1990 and 1997 to 2000.

On July 19, 2000 Morán was appointed bishop of San Miguel by Pope John Paul II.

On February 6, 2016 Morán was named bishop of Santa Ana by Pope Francis.
