= Agua Caliente, El Salvador =

Agua Caliente
- District
- Location in El Salvador
- Coordinates: 14°10′N 89°13′W
- Country: El Salvador
- Department: Chalatenango
- Municipality: Chalatenango Centro
- Elevation: 381 m (1,250 ft)

Population (2024 census)
  - District: 7,341
  - Rank: 159th in El Salvador
  - Rural: 7,341

Agua Caliente is a district in the Chalatenango Department of El Salvador, north of the department capital Chalatenango. It has an area of 195 square kilometers and a population (2006) of 8,992. The city center is at 14°11′12.91″N, 89°13′19.82″W. It has the 27th poorest of the 267 municipalities of El Salvador.
