= José Oscar Barahona Castillo =

- Bishop of San Vicente
- Church: Catholic Church
- Diocese: Diocese of San Vicente
- In office: 6 June 1983 – 4 June 2005
- Predecessor: Pedro Arnoldo Aparicio y Quintanilla
- Successor: José Luis Escobar Alas
- Previous posts: Titular Bishop of Mibiarca (1982-1983); Auxiliary Bishop of San Vicente (1982-1983)

Orders
- Ordination: 20 June 1963
- Consecration: 9 October 1982 by Pedro Arnoldo Aparicio y Quintanilla

Personal details
- Born: 29 November 1938 Mercedes La Ceiba, La Paz Department, El Salvador
- Died: 22 October 2016 (aged 77)

Mons. José Oscar Barahona Castillo (11 November 1938 – 22 October 2016) was a Catholic bishop.

Ordained to the priesthood in 1963, Barahona Castillo served as auxiliary of the Catholic Diocese of San Vicente, El Salvador, from 1982 to 1983. He then served as diocesan bishop of the San Vincente Diocese from 1983 to 2005.
