= Diocese of Zacatecoluca =

Roman Catholic diocese in El Salvador

Diocese of Zacatecoluca Dioecesis Zacatecolucana
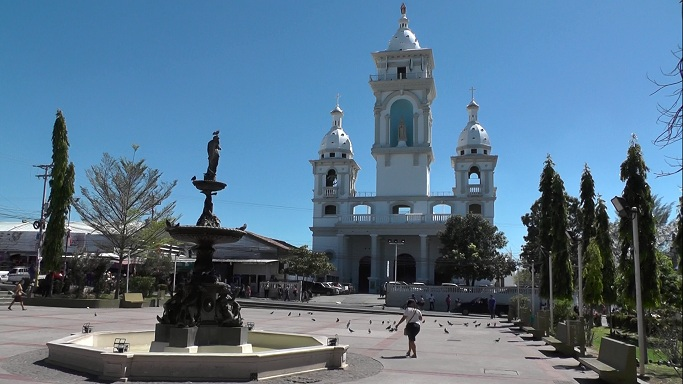

Location
- Country: El Salvador
- Ecclesiastical province: Province of San Salvador
- Metropolitan: José Luis Escobar Alas

Statistics
- Area: 1,536 km^{2} (593 sq mi)
- Population: Total; Catholics: (as of 2010); 336,000; 283,000 (84.2%)
- Parishes: 32

Information
- Denomination: Catholic Church
- Sui iuris church: Latin Church
- Rite: Roman Rite
- Established: 5 May 1987 (39 years ago)
- Cathedral: Catedral de Nuestra Señora de los Pobres

Current leadership
- Pope: Leo XIV
- Bishop: Ramiro Ernesto Landaverde Orellana
- Bishops emeritus: Elías Samuel Bolaños Avelar, S.D.B.

Map
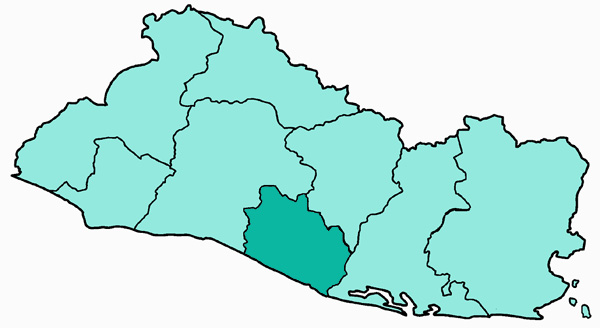

The Diocese of Zacatecoluca (Latin: Dioecesis Zacatecolucana) is a Latin Church ecclesiastical territory or diocese of the Catholic Church in El Salvador. It is a suffragan diocese in the ecclesiastical province of the metropolitan Archdiocese of San Salvador. The Diocese of Zacatecoluca was erected on 5 May 1987.

== Ordinaries ==
- Romeo Tovar Astorga, O.F.M. (5 May 1987 – 17 December 1996), appointed Coadjutor Bishop of San Miguel
- Elías Samuel Bolaños Avelar, S.D.B. (27 February 1998 – 6 July 2026)
- Ramiro Ernesto Landaverde Orellana (since 6 July 2026)

== External links and references ==
- "Diocese of Zacatecoluca". Catholic-Hierarchy.
