= Diocese of Santiago de María =

Roman Catholic diocese in El Salvador

Diocese of Santiago de María Dioecesis Sancti Iacobi de Maria

Location
- Country: El Salvador
- Ecclesiastical province: Province of San Salvador
- Metropolitan: José Luis Escobar Alas

Statistics
- Area: 2,866 km^{2} (1,107 sq mi)
- Population: Total; Catholics: (as of 2014); 563,000; 449,700 (79.9%)
- Parishes: 40

Information
- Denomination: Catholic Church
- Sui iuris church: Latin Church
- Rite: Roman Rite
- Established: 2 December 1954 (70 years ago)
- Cathedral: Cathedral of St. James the Apostle
- Secular priests: 85

Current leadership
- Pope: Leo XIV
- Bishop: William Ernesto Iraheta Rivera

Map
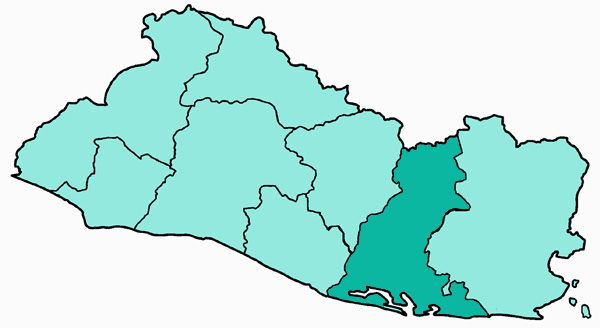

The Diocese of Santiago de María is a Latin Church ecclesiastical territory or diocese of the Catholic Church in El Salvador. It is a suffragan diocese in the ecclesiastical province of the metropolitan Archdiocese of San Salvador. The Diocese of Santiago de María was erected on 2 December 1954.

== Ordinaries ==
- Francisco José Castro y Ramírez (1956–1974)
- Óscar Arnulfo Romero y Galdámez (1974–1977), appointed Archbishop of San Salvador
- Arturo Rivera Damas, S.D.B. (1977–1983), appointed Archbishop of San Salvador
- Rodrigo Orlando Cabrera Cuéllar (1983–2016)
- William Ernesto Iraheta Rivera (2016– )
