= Rodrigo Orlando Cabrera Cuéllar =

El Salvatorian Roman Catholic prelate (1938–2022)

His Excellency Rodrigo Orlando Cabrera Cuéllar
- Bishop of Santiago de Maria
- Diocese: Santiago de Maria
- Appointed: 23 December 1983
- Term ended: 4 January 2016
- Predecessor: Arturo Rivera Damas
- Successor: William Ernesto Iraheta Rivera

Orders
- Ordination: 6 January 1962
- Consecration: 11 February 1984 by Lajos Kada

Personal details
- Born: 14 March 1938 Teotepeque, El Salvador
- Died: 14 June 2022 (aged 84) Santiago de Maria, El Salvador

Rodrigo Orlando Cabrera Cuéllar (14 March 1938 – 14 June 2022) was a Salvadoran Roman Catholic prelate.

Cabrera Cuéllar was born in El Salvador and was ordained to the priesthood in 1962. He served as bishop of the Roman Catholic Diocese of Santiago de Maria, El Salvador, from 1985 to his retirement in 2016.

Catholic Church titles
Preceded by Arturo Rivera Damas	Bishop of Santiago de Maria; 1983–2016	Succeeded by William Ernesto Iraheta Rivera
