= Diocese of Santa Ana =

Roman Catholic diocese in El Salvador

Diocese of Santa Ana Dioecesis Sanctae Annae
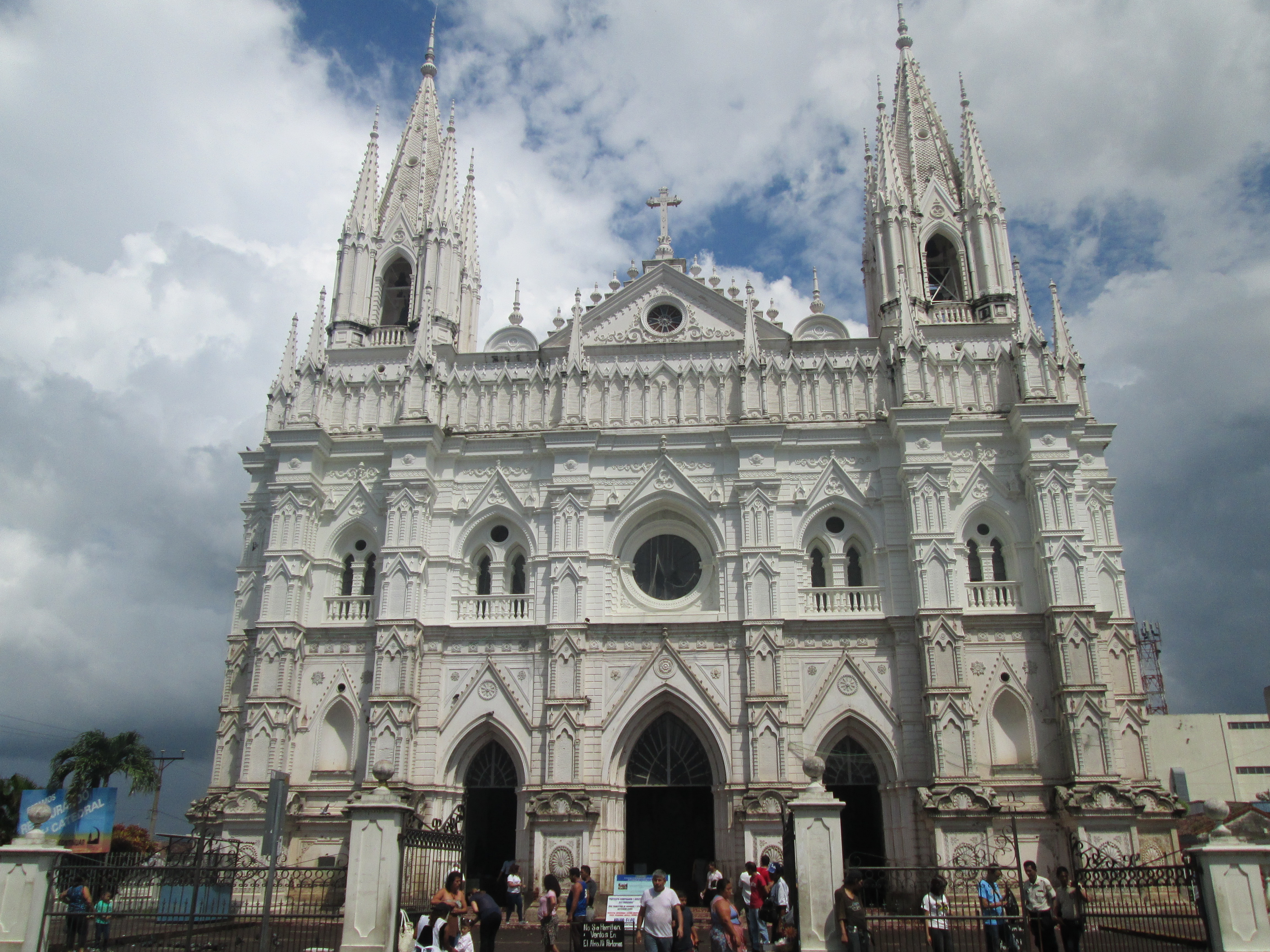
- Catedral de Nuestra Señora de Santa Ana

Location
- Country: El Salvador
- Ecclesiastical province: Province of San Salvador
- Metropolitan: José Luis Escobar Alas

Statistics
- Area: 3,272 km^{2} (1,263 sq mi)
- Population: Total; Catholics: (as of 2014); 1,533,000; 985,000 (64.3%)
- Parishes: 58

Information
- Denomination: Catholic Church
- Sui iuris church: Latin Church
- Rite: Roman Rite
- Established: 11 February 1913 (113 years ago)
- Cathedral: The Cathedral of Our Lady Saint Anne
- Secular priests: 113

Current leadership
- Pope: Leo XIV
- Bishop: Miguel Angel Moran Aquino
- Bishops emeritus: Romeo Tovar Astorga, O.F.M

Map
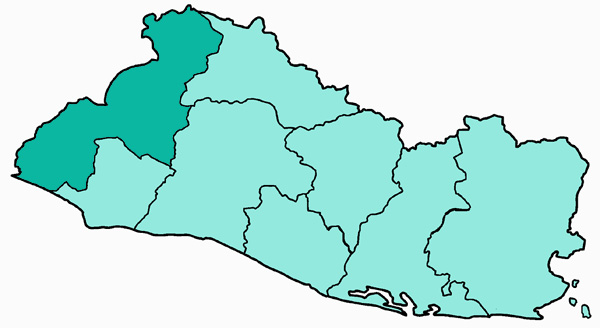

The Diocese of Santa Ana is a Latin Church ecclesiastical territory or diocese of the Catholic Church in El Salvador. It is a suffragan diocese in the ecclesiastical province of the metropolitan Archdiocese of San Salvador. The Diocese of Santa Ana was erected on 11 February 1913.

== Bishops ==
=== Ordinaries ===
- Giacomo Richardo Vilanova y Meléndez (1914–1953)
- Benjamin Barrera y Reyes, M.I. (1954–1981)
- Marco René Revelo Contreras (1981–1998)
- Romeo Tovar Astorga, O.F.M. (1999–2016)
- Miguel Angel Moran Aquino (2016– )

=== Auxiliary bishops ===
- Benjamin Barrera y Reyes, M.J. (1952–1954), appointed Bishop of Santa Ana
- Lorenzo Michele Joseph Graziano, O.F.M. (1961–1965), appointed Coadjutor Bishop of San Miguel
- Fernando Sáenz Lacalle, O.F.M. (1984–1995), appointed Archbishop of San Salvador
- Luis Morao Andreazza, O.F.M. (2003–2007), appointed Bishop of Chalatenango
- José Elías Rauda Gutiérrez, O.F.M. (2008–2009), appointed Bishop of San Vicente

== Territorial losses ==
Year	Along with	To form
1986		Diocese of Sonsonate

== External links and references ==
- "Diocese of Santa Ana". Catholic-Hierarchy.
