= Fernando Sáenz Lacalle =

Archbishop of San Salvador (1930–2022)

The Most Reverend Fernando Sáenz Lacalle
- Archbishop of San Salvador
- See: San Salvador
- Installed: 22 April 1995
- Term ended: 27 December 2008
- Predecessor: Arturo Rivera y Damas
- Successor: José Luis Escobar Alas
- Other post: President of the Conferencia Episcopal de El Salvador
- Previous posts: Auxiliary Bishop of Santa Ana and Titular Bishop of Tabbora (1984–1995)

Orders
- Ordination: 9 August 1959
- Consecration: 6 January 1985 by Pope John Paul II

Personal details
- Born: 16 November 1930 Cintruénigo, Spain
- Died: 28 April 2022 (aged 91) La Libertad, El Salvador
- Denomination: Roman Catholic Church

Styles of Fernando Sáenz Lacalle
- Reference style: The Most Reverend
- Spoken style: Your Excellency
- Religious style: Monsignor

Fernando Sáenz Lacalle (16 November 1930 – 28 April 2022) was a Spanish Roman Catholic prelate, 10th Bishop and sixth Archbishop of San Salvador, El Salvador. He was the successor of Arturo Rivera y Damas. Sáenz held the post once held by Archbishop Óscar Romero, who was assassinated in 1980.

== Role as bishop ==
=== Liberation theology ===
In the years following his installation, Sáenz was accused by critics of eviscerating the "preferential option for the poor" of his predecessors, notably Romero, by clamping down on progressive church movements affiliated with liberation theology with a series of personnel movements, closing of programs, and changes to seminary curriculum. Sáenz defended his stances by saying that the Roman Catholic Church must speak on behalf of the poor and defenseless, but never become involved in activism or politics. Sáenz was a member of the Opus Dei. He supported the canonization cause of his predecessor, Romero.

=== Metropolitan cathedral ===
Sáenz presided over the completion of the Metropolitan Cathedral on 19 March 1999. Sáenz seemed to find his voice after two deadly earthquakes struck El Salvador a year apart in 2000 and 2001, with the archbishop springing into action to marshal international relief. In more recent years, Sáenz advocated conservative Catholic views on sex and contraception, called for civil cooperation with police authorities to combat gang violence, and criticized labor strikes in the health sector as an unjustifiable denial of service to hospital patients.

=== Retirement ===
In accordance with Canon law, Sáenz tendered his retirement as archbishop on 27 December 2008, and it was accepted. Bishop José Luis Escobar Alas of the Roman Catholic Diocese of San Vicente, El Salvador, was named the eleventh Bishop and seventh Archbishop of San Salvador, El Salvador on Monday, 29 December 2008, by Pope Benedict XVI.

Catholic Church titles
Preceded by Arturo Rivera y Damas	Archbishop of San Salvador; 1995–2008	Succeeded by José Luis Escobar Alas
Preceded by Getúlio Teixeira Guimarães	Titular Bishop of Tabbora; 1984–1995	Succeeded by Eugène Lambert Adrian Rixen
