= Diocese of Sonsonate =

Roman Catholic diocese in El Salvador

Diocese of Sonsonate Dioecesis Sonsonatensis
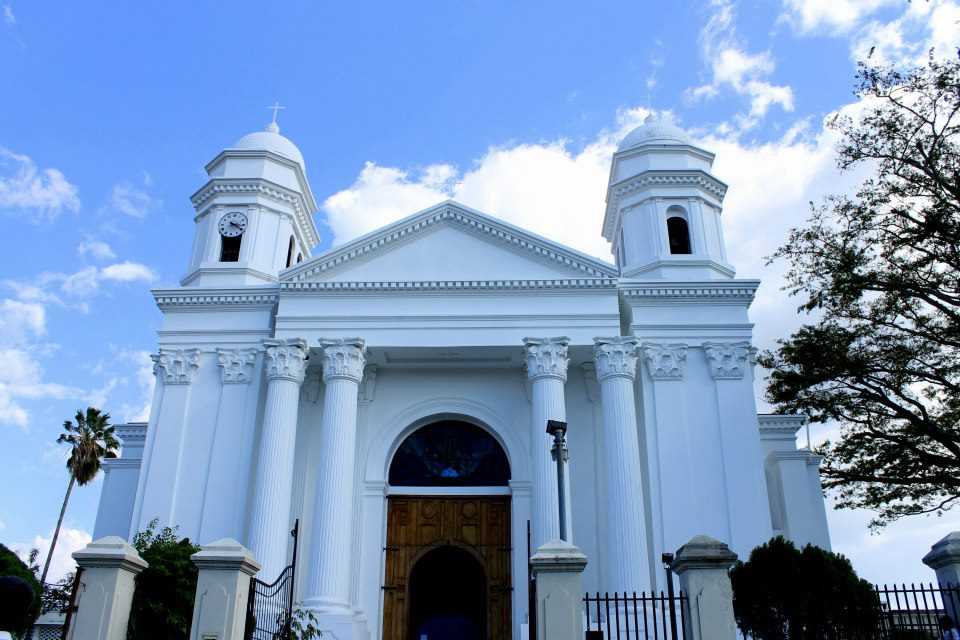

Location
- Country: El Salvador
- Ecclesiastical province: Province of San Salvador
- Metropolitan: José Luis Escobar Alas

Statistics
- Area: 1,225 km^{2} (473 sq mi)
- Population: Total; Catholics: (as of 2010); 548,000; 439,000 (80.1%)
- Parishes: 26

Information
- Denomination: Catholic Church
- Sui iuris church: Latin Church
- Rite: Roman Rite
- Established: 31 May 1986 (39 years ago)
- Cathedral: Cathedral of the Most Holy Trinity

Current leadership
- Pope: Leo XIV
- Bishop: Constantino Barrera Morales

Map
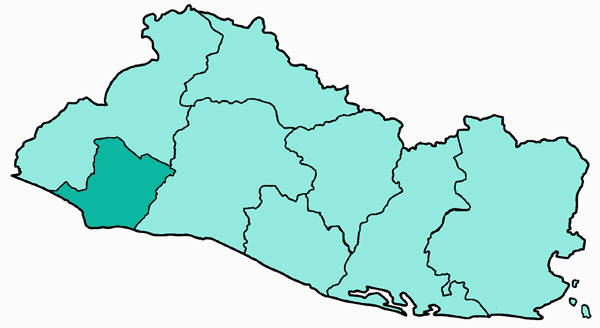

The Diocese of Sonsonate is a Latin Church ecclesiastical territory or diocese of the Catholic Church in El Salvador. It is a suffragan diocese in the ecclesiastical province of the metropolitan Archdiocese of San Salvador. The Diocese of Sonsonate was erected on 31 May 1986.

== Ordinaries ==
- José Carmen Di Pietro Pésolo, S.D.B. (1986–1989)
- José Adolfo Mojica Morales (1989–2011)
- Fabio Reynaldo Colindres Abarca (2011–2012); Apostolic Administrator "ad nutum Sanctae Sedis"; concurrently Military Ordinary of El Salvador
- Constantino Barrera Morales (2012–present); Bishop-elect; formerly Rector of the Salvadoran National Major Seminary, "San Jose de la Montana"
