= Arturo Rivera y Damas =

Archbishop of San Salvador (1923–1994)

The Most Reverend Arturo Rivera y Damas S.D.B.
- Archbishop of San Salvador
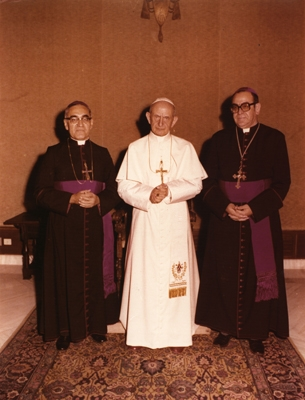
- See: San Salvador
- Installed: 28 February 1983
- Term ended: 26 November 1994
- Predecessor: Óscar Romero
- Successor: Fernando Sáenz Lacalle
- Other posts: Bishop of Santiago de María (1977–1983); Auxiliary Bishop of San Salvador (1960–1977)

Orders
- Ordination: 19 September 1953
- Consecration: 23 October 1960 by Luis Chávez y González

Personal details
- Born: 30 September 1923 San Esteban Catarina, El Salvador
- Died: 26 November 1994 (aged 71) San Salvador, El Salvador
- Denomination: Roman Catholic Church
- Residence: San Salvador

Styles of Arturo Rivera y Damas
- Reference style: The Most Reverend
- Spoken style: Your Excellency
- Religious style: Monsignor

Arturo Rivera y Damas (30 September 1923 – 26 November 1994) was the ninth Bishop and fifth Archbishop of San Salvador, El Salvador. Msgr. Rivera's term as archbishop (1983–1994) coincided with the Salvadoran Civil War. He was the immediate successor of Archbishop Óscar Romero. During Romero's archbishopric (1977–1980), Rivera was Romero's key ally. He had been the auxiliary of Romero's long-reigning predecessor, Luis Chávez y González (1938–1977). He was also a friend of Mother Teresa, who stayed at his family home on her visit to El Salvador.

== Biography ==
Rivera was born in San Esteban Catarina, El Salvador, on 30 September 1923. He was ordained a Priest of the order of Salesians of Don Bosco on 19 September 1953. "I joined the Salesians", Rivera told the National Catholic Reporter, "because I wanted to work with the poor, and back then they were the ones who were doing that."

He was appointed to his first tour as Auxiliary Bishop of San Salvador on 30 July 1960. At the same time, he was appointed Titular Bishop of Legia. In light of the social foment that began in the archdiocese in the 1970s, Rivera supported the controversial pastoral work undertaken by Father Rutilio Grande in the rural outskirts of San Salvador. According to Jesuit academic Rodolfo Cardenal, Rivera "supported the pastoral and theological innovations" being carried out by the Jesuits. However, the Church hierarchy apparently disapproved because, when Archbishop Chávez retired in 1977, they overlooked Rivera, Chávez' auxiliary, and selected the more conservative Óscar Romero as Archbishop of San Salvador, to the liberals' dismay. By that time, Rivera had been tarred as a "red bishop" because of his activism.

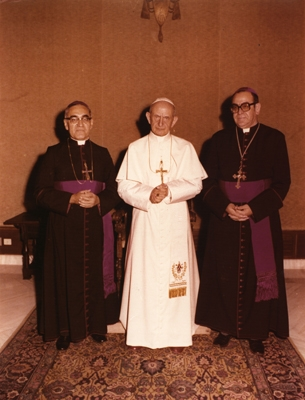
Bishops Rivera (right) and Romero (left) in audience with Pope Paul VI in June 1978

In September 1977, Rivera was appointed Bishop of Santiago de María—filling Óscar Romero's old post. During Romero's stormy tenure as archbishop, Rivera was often Romero's lone ally in the Salvadoran Bishops' Conference, which became divided over Romero's leadership. The bishops were split between a conservative sector, allegedly aligned to traditional institutions of power in Salvadoran society, and progressive groups influenced by the reformist doctrines of the Second Vatican Council and the Medellín Bishops Conference of 1968. Msgr. Rivera attended both influential synods.

After Romero's assassination on 24 March 1980, Rivera was named apostolic administrator of the archdiocese, but not archbishop—in what his friends saw as one more Vatican slight—until February 1983. Rivera's tenure was a delicate time, during which he sought to avoid Romero's fate, while still denouncing injustices and crimes of war in emphatic terms. The Church under Rivera played a role as monitor of the peace process alongside the United Nations. In 1989, Archbishop Rivera presided over one of the darkest moments in the Civil War period, when the Jesuit staff of the Central American University of San Salvador Universidad Centroamericana "José Simeón Cañas" were massacred in assassinations that harkened back to murders at the inception of the war, such as the Romero assassination. Rivera reportedly told Alfredo Cristiani, the President of El Salvador to post soldiers outside his offices. "Don't get me wrong", Rivera then told the president. "It's not that I trust the soldiers. But if I'm killed, I want it clear who did it."

The UCA massacre put pressure on the government to end the war and sign a peace deal. Rivera moderated the negotiations of the final Peace Accords signed between the Farabundo Martí National Liberation Front (FMLN) and the Salvadoran government in 1992. In the final years of his ministry, Rivera eagerly instituted a canonization process for his martyred predecessor.

Rivera died on 26 November 1994. During a 1996 visit to the Metropolitan Cathedral of the Holy Savior (Catedral Metropolitana de San Salvador) where Rivera and his predecessors are buried, Pope John Paul II said that Rivera "entered into eternity after having seen the peace, for which he and the other bishops of El Salvador had worked tirelessly, burst over the horizon."

== Footnotes ==
Catholic Church titles
Preceded by Óscar Arnulfo Romero y Galdámez	Archbishop of San Salvador; 1983–1994	Succeeded by Fernando Sáenz Lacalle
