= Metropolitan Cathedral of San Salvador =

Catholic cathedral church in El Salvador

Coordinates: 13.6983°N 89.1908°W

- Catedral Metropolitana de San Salvador
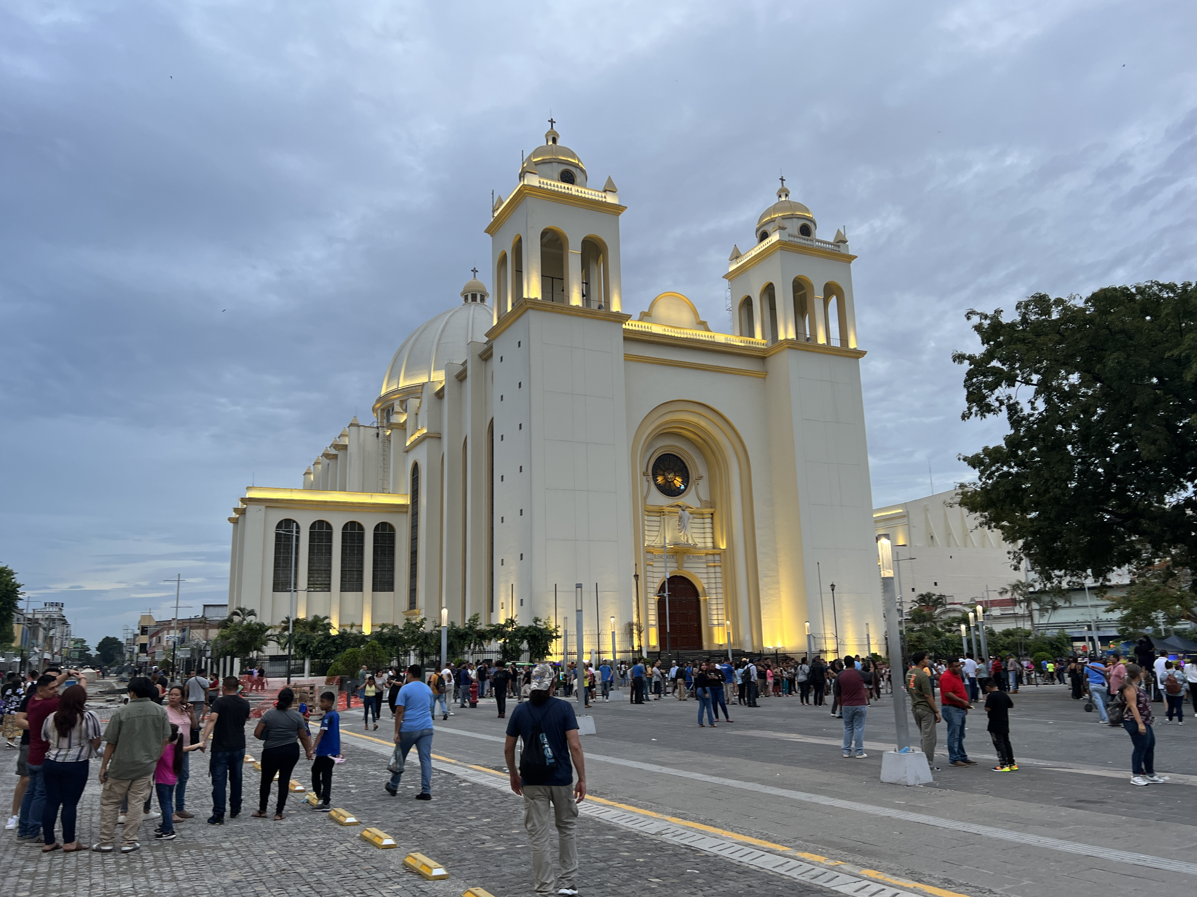
- Third cathedral in the Historic Downtown San Salvador

Religion
- Affiliation: Catholic Church
- Rite: Roman Rite
- Patron: Transfiguration of Jesus

Location
- Location: Av. Monseñor Oscar Arnulfo Romero y 2 Av. Sur #213, San Salvador
- Country: El Salvador
- Interactive map of Metropolitan Cathedral of San Salvador

Architecture
- Architect: Dominikus Böhm
- Type: Cathedral
- Established: 28 September 1842 (as the 1st cathedral)
- Groundbreaking: 17 September 1880 (2nd); 12 October 1956 (3rd)
- Completed: 1842 (1st); 1888 (2nd); 1999 (3rd)
- Destroyed: 19 March 1873 (1st)(Earthquake); 8 August 1951 (2nd)(Conflagration)
- Demolished: 19 March 1873 (1st)(Earthquake); 8 August 1951 (2nd)(Conflagration)

Specifications
- Direction of façade: South
- Elevation: 664 m (2,178 ft)

Website
- Official Site

The Metropolitan Cathedral of the Holy Savior (Spanish: Catedral Metropolitana de San Salvador) is the cathedral church of the Catholic Archdiocese of San Salvador in San Salvador, El Salvador.

== History ==
The cathedral site is the place where the old Temple of Santo Domingo (dedicated to St. Dominic) once stood. It is on the northern side of Plaza Barrios, named after the Salvadoran military hero, Gerardo Barrios. The eastern periphery of Plaza Barrios is the old National Palace building. The first cathedral was established in 1842 and destroyed in an 1873 earthquake.

The second wooden cathedral, completed in 1888, served as the seat of San Salvador's archbishops. On August 8, 1951, the Old San Salvador Cathedral was consumed by fire as a distraught crowd of onlookers watched.

For the next forty years, the San Salvador Cathedral was a barren concrete structure of exposed bricks and jutting iron buttresses. During the late 1970s, Archbishop Óscar Romero famously deferred completion of the Cathedral in order to fund projects for the poor. The site was also the stage of several national sagas, including the grand funerals of assassinated political figures, and Romero's fiery Sunday Masses. On May 9, 1979, 24 demonstrators were gunned down by supposedly security forces on the front steps of the cathedral during the San Salvador Cathedral Massacre.

An even greater toll was exacted on Palm Sunday, March 30, 1980, during the funeral of Óscar Romero (who was assassinated Monday, March 24, 1980). At his funeral, 44 people were killed during a stampede after some elements, allegedly members of security forces (although it has never been corroborated) fired on mourners/worshippers and on Romero's funeral cortege. The gunmen were never officially identified. Later, the square in front of the cathedral was the site of rapturous celebrations after the signing of the Chapultepec Peace Accords that ended the Salvadoran Civil War in 1992. The cathedral was completed and inaugurated on March 19, 1999, and finished off with a festive tiled facade by the Salvadoran master Fernando Llort.

The church was twice visited by Pope John Paul II who said that the cathedral was "intimately allied with the joys and hopes of the Salvadoran people." During his visits in 1983 and 1996, the pope knelt and prayed before the tomb of Archbishop Óscar Romero, assassinated in 1980, whose tomb here is a major pilgrim draw. United States President Barack Obama visited the cathedral and the tomb during his March 2011 trip to Latin America.

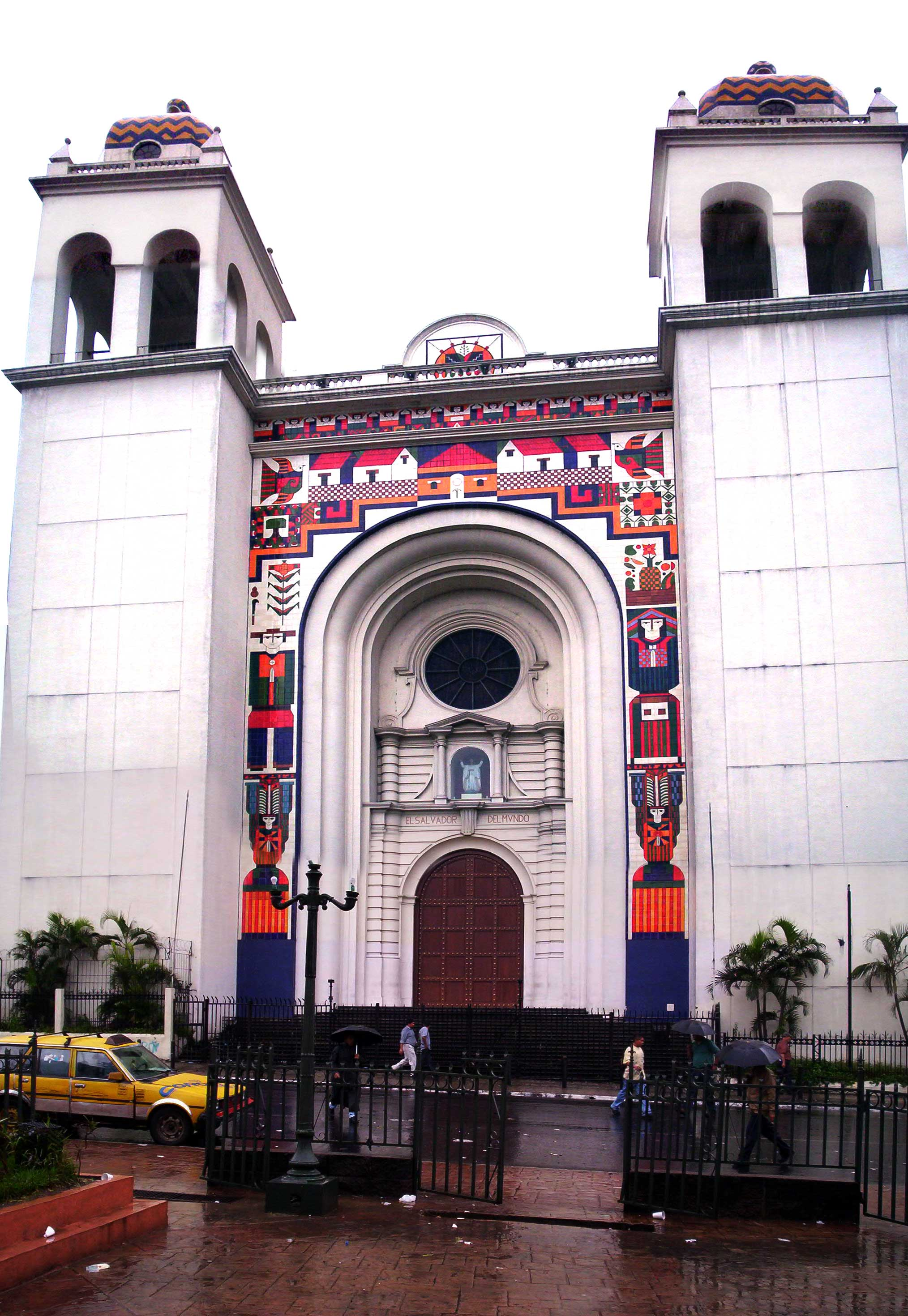
Fernando Llort's destroyed ceramic mural facade

In late December 2012, the Archbishop of San Salvador, José Luis Escobar Alas, ordered the removal of Llort's tiled ceramic mural facade of the cathedral without consulting the national government or the artist. Workers chipped off and destroyed all 2,700 tiles of the mural.

== Architecture and style ==
The festive and colorful facade surrounds a shrine to an image of the Divine Saviour of the World (Jesus, after the Transfiguration, the patron of El Salvador) sculpted by Friar Francisco Silvestre García in 1777. The main altar features an image of the Divine Saviour donated by the Holy Roman Emperor Charles V in 1546. The image rests on a four-column baldacchino surrounded by images of the prophets Moses and Elijah, who take part in the Transfiguration story. The main altar is surrounded by eight large paintings showing scenes from the life of Christ painted by Andrés García Ibáñez. Above it all, the bright Churrigueresque cupola stands 148 feet in height, with a 79-foot radius.
