= José Luis Escobar Alas =

Salvadorian Catholic priest

The Most Reverend José Luis Escobar Alas
- Archbishop of San Salvador
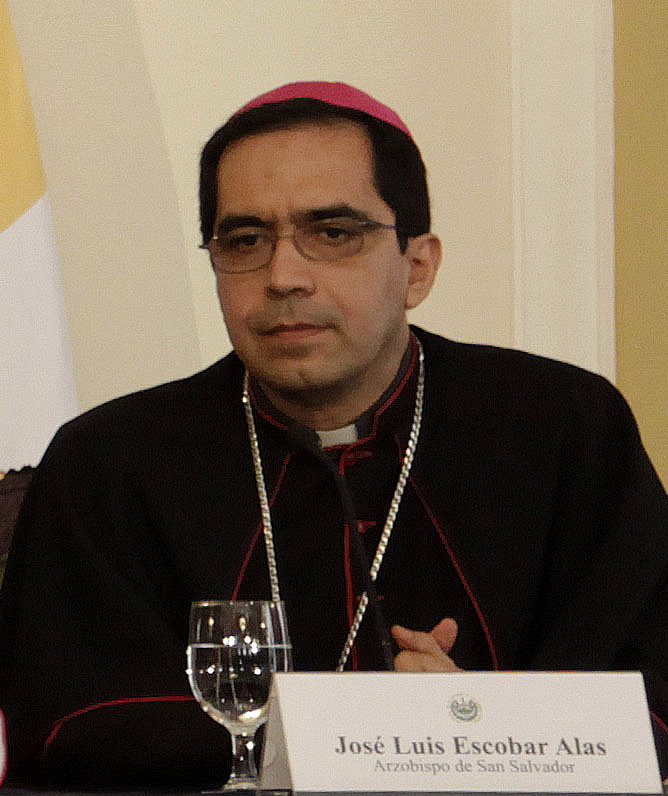
- The archbishop in 2015.
- Church: Roman Catholic Church
- Appointed: 27 December 2008
- Installed: 14 February 2009
- Predecessor: Fernando Sáenz Lacalle
- Other post: President of the Salvadoran Episcopal Conference (2009–)
- Previous posts: Titular Bishop of Thibica (2002–05); Auxiliary Bishop of San Vicente (2002–05); Bishop of San Vicente (2005–08)

Orders
- Ordination: 15 August 1982 by Pedro Arnoldo Aparicio y Quintanilla
- Consecration: 23 March 2002 by José Oscar Barahona Castillo

Personal details
- Born: José Luis Escobar Alas; 10 March 1959 (age 67) Suchitoto, El Salvador
- Education: Pontifical Gregorian University

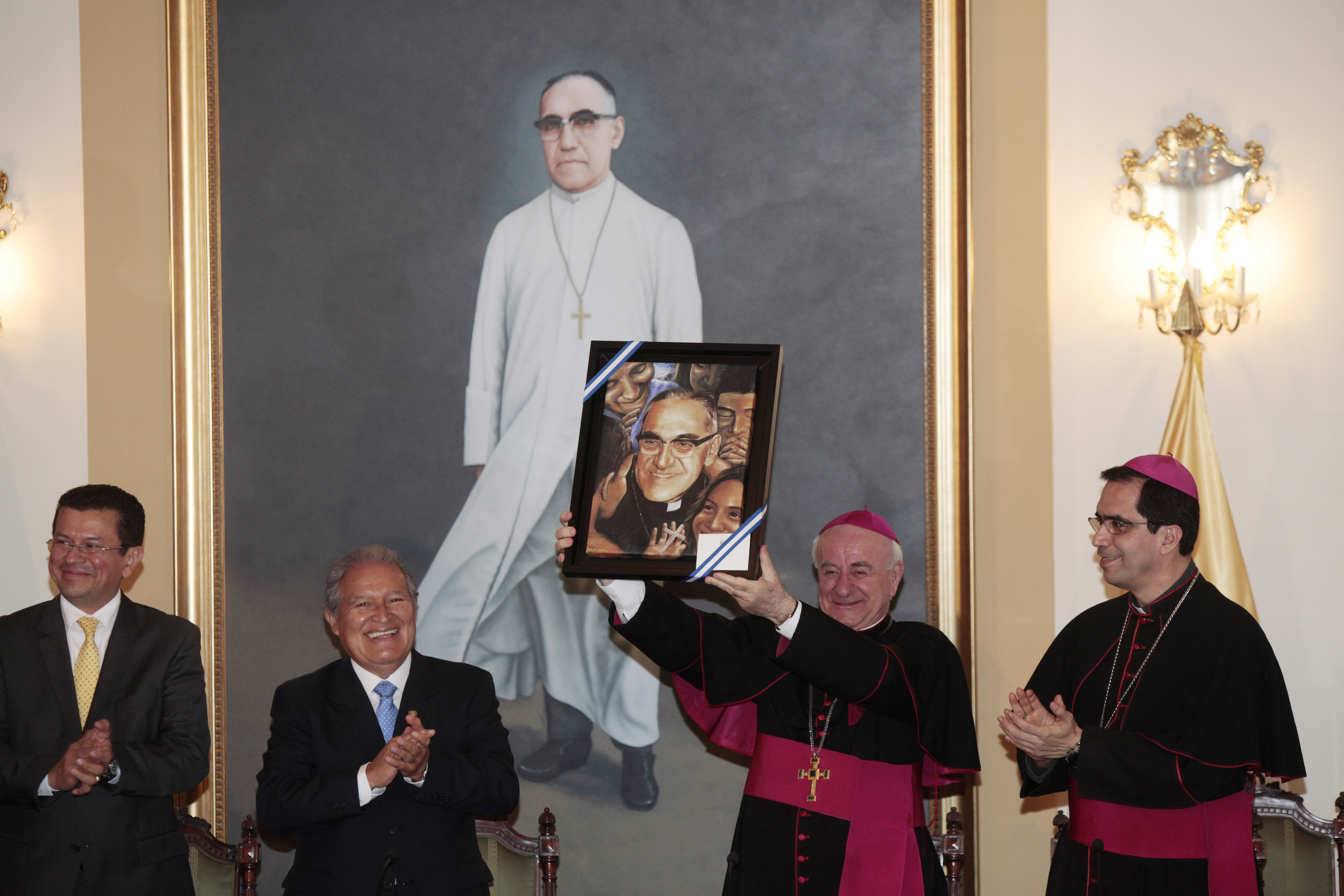
F.l.t.r. Hugo Martinez (Chancellor of El Salvador), Salvador Sanchez Ceren, (President of El Salvador); Vincenzo Paglia and José Luis Escobar Alas in 2015.

José Luis Escobar Alas (born 10 March 1959) is a Salvadoran Catholic prelate who has served as Archbishop of San Salvador since 2009.

Escobar served as Bishop of San Vicente beginning in 2005, prior to his elevation to San Salvador on 27 December 2008. He was previously an auxiliary bishop in the Diocese of San Vicente since 2002, having entered the priesthood in 1982.

== Biography ==
Escobar was born in the town of Suchitoto in the department of Cuscatlán. He studied for the priesthood at San José de la Montaña Seminary in San Salvador before entering the Seminario Mayor de Morelia in Mexico. He later graduated with a philosophy degree from Pontifical Gregorian University in Rome. He was ordained a priest on August 15, 1982.

Thereafter, he was Rector of the San Vicente Diocesan Seminary before teaching at San José de la Montaña Seminary in San Salvador, after which he was appointed to the Nuestra Señora del Pilar (Our Lady of the Pillar) parish in San Vicente. Escobar served as Vicar General of the Diocese of San Vicente before being named an auxiliary bishop by Pope John Paul II on January 19, 2002. He was consecrated as an auxiliary bishop on March 23, 2002 and then was promoted as Bishop of San Vicente on July 9, 2005, where he served until becoming Archbishop of San Salvador in 2006.

In late December 2012, Escobar authorised the removal of the tiled ceramic mural façade of the San Salvador Cathedral, El Salvador's principal basilica, without consultation with the national government nor the artist, Fernando Llort. This resulted in the destruction of all the 2,700 tiles of the mural which depicted former archbishop Óscar Romero.

In July 2022 he voiced his support for the government's crackdown on gangs.

== See also ==
- Metropolitan Cathedral of San Salvador

Catholic Church titles
Preceded by Fernando Sáenz Lacalle	Archbishop of San Salvador; 2008–	Succeeded by Incumbent
