= Archdiocese of San Salvador =

Roman Catholic archdiocese in El Salvador

Archdiocese of San Salvador Archidiœcesis Sancti Salvatoris in America Arquidócesis de San Salvador
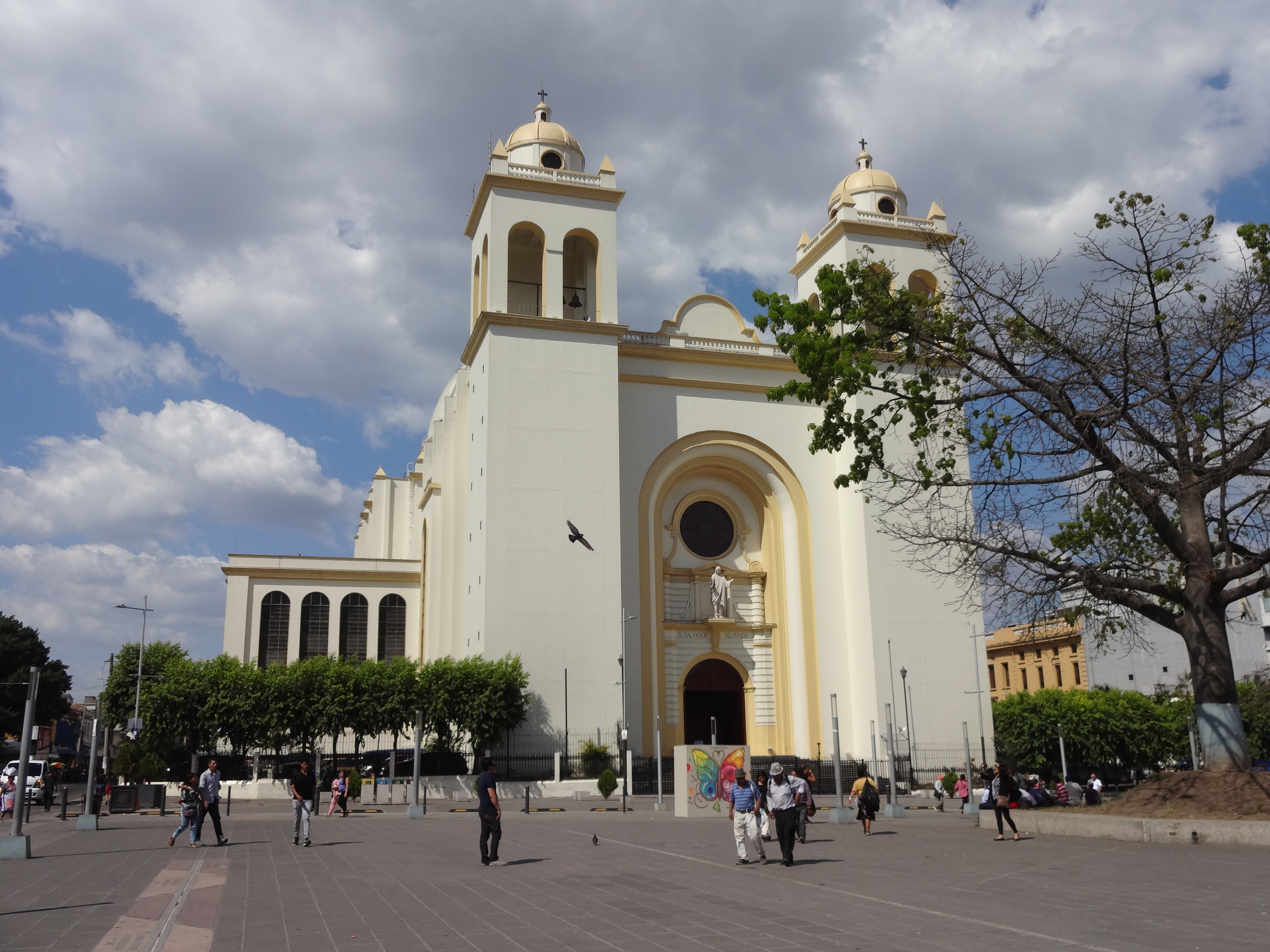
- Metropolitan Cathedral of San Salvador

Location
- Country: El Salvador
- Territory: San Salvador Department; La Libertad Department; Cuscatlán Department
- Ecclesiastical province: San Salvador
- Metropolitan: Metropolitan Area of San Salvador
- Headquarters: San Salvador City

Statistics
- Area: 3,295 km^{2} (1,272 sq mi)
- Population: Total; Catholics: (as of 2014); 3,137,000; 2,322,000 (74.02%)
- Parishes: 162
- Congregations: 354
- Members: 1,826

Information
- Denomination: Catholic Church
- Sui iuris church: Latin Church
- Rite: Roman Rite
- Established: 28 September 1842 (184 years, 32 days) as Diocese of San Salvador
- Cathedral: Catedral Metropolitana de San Salvador (Metropolitan Cathedral of the Holy Savior)
- Secular priests: 158
- Language: Spanish and Latin

Current leadership
- Pope: Leo XIV
- Metropolitan Archbishop: José Luis Escobar Alas

Map
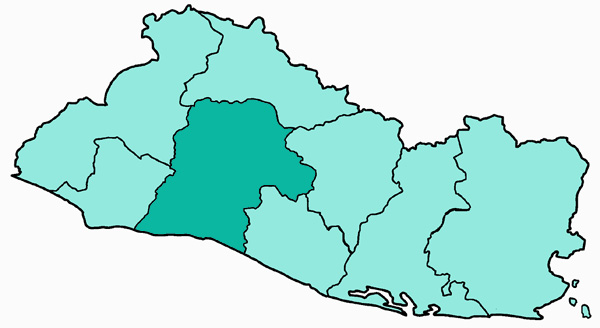

Website
- www.arzobispadosansalvador.org

The Archdiocese of San Salvador is a Latin Church ecclesiastical territory or archdiocese of the Catholic Church in El Salvador. Its archepiscopal see is the Salvadoran capital, San Salvador, and the surrounding region.

The current Archbishop of San Salvador is José Luis Escobar Alas. His cathedra is in Metropolitan Cathedral of San Salvador, otherwise the Metropolitan Cathedral of the Holy Saviour (Catedral Metropolitana de San Salvador). The city also has a former cathedral, now the Basilica of the Sacred Heart of Jesus (Spanish: Basílica del Sagrado Corazón de Jesús), and a minor basilica dedicated to the Virgin of Guadelupe, the Basílica de la Ceiba de Nuestra Señora de Guadalupe. The Archdiocese of San Salvador is the sole metropolitan see in El Salvador, with seven suffragan dioceses in its ecclesiastical province: the Dioceses of Chalatenango, San Miguel, San Vicente, Santa Ana, Santiago de María, Sonsonate, and Zacatecoluca.

The Archdiocese of San Salvador has an unusual arrangement in which the auxiliary bishop, Gregorio Rosa Chávez, is a cardinal, whilst the archbishop is not. The Archbishop of San Salvador retains ordinary authority over the archdiocese.

== Statistics ==
As of 2014, it pastorally served 2,322,000 Catholics (74.0% of 3,137,000 total) on 3,295 km^{2} in 162 parishes and 6 missions with 354 priests (158 diocesan, 196 religious), 1 deacon, 1,471 lay religious (343 brothers, 1,128 sisters) and 107 seminarians.

== History ==
What is currently the territory of the Republic of El Salvador previously was part of the Spanish colonial Captaincy General (governorship) of Guatemala and, ecclesiastically, of the Archdiocese of Guatemala. Until 1842, there were four church regions in El Salvador, which reported to the San Salvador region, the most important one: Santa Ana, Sonsonate, San Vicente and San Miguel.

- Pope Gregory XVI erected the Diocese of the Divine Savior (in Spanish, El Salvador means "The Savior"), separating the territory of the Republic of El Salvador from the Archdiocese of Guatemala, by Papal bull dated 28 September 1842, constituting it as a suffragan diocese of the Archdiocese of Guatemala.
- On 22 February 1913, it was promoted as Metropolitan Archdiocese of San Salvador / Sancti Salvatoris in America (Latin), having lost territory to establish as first suffragan sees Diocese of San Miguel and Diocese of Santa Ana
- It lost territories again on 18 December 1943, to establish Diocese of San Vicente, and on 30 December 1987, to establish Diocese of Chalatenango, both as its suffragans.
- Pope John Paul II undertook papal visits to the diocese in March 1983 and February 1996.

=== Twentieth Century policy ===
Under three archbishops, Luis Chávez y González, Óscar Arnulfo Romero y Galdámez, and Arturo Rivera y Damas, the archdiocese saw over fifty years of a progressive pastoral ministry influenced by the currents of the Second Vatican Council and a Latin American church trend that later was known as Liberation Theology. Critics interpreted the Church's advocacy for the poor as fomenting a socialist revolution and targeted the clergy for assassination. Two bishops, including Archbishop Romero, were assassinated, as were twenty six priests (including Fr. Rutilio Grande), three nuns and countless catechists and Church workers.

The post-Civil War period saw a return to traditional spirituality under the watch of the conservative Archbishop Fernando Sáenz Lacalle, a former military chaplain and member of Opus Dei.

=== Sexual abuse cases ===
In November 2015, sex abuse scandals in the Archdiocese of San Salvador became public when the archdiocese's third highest ranking priest, Jesus Delgado, who was also the biographer and personal secretary of the Salvadoran Archbishop Oscar Romero was dismissed by the archdiocese after its investigation showed that he had molested a girl, now 42 years of age, when she was between the ages of 9 and 17. Due to the statute of limitations, Delgado could not face criminal charges. In December 2016, a canonical court convicted Delgado and two other El Salvador priests, Francisco Galvez and Antonio Molina, of committing acts of sex abuse between the years 1980 and 2000 and laicized them from the priesthood. In November 2019, the archdiocese acknowledged sex abuse committed by a priest identified as Leopoldo Sosa Tolentino in 1994 and issued a public apology to his victim. Tolentino was suspended from ministry and began the canonical trial process. Another El Salvador priest was laicized in 2019 after pleading guilty to sex abuse in a Vatican trial and is serving a 16-year prison sentence after being convicted in a criminal trial.

== Ecclesiastical province ==
The ecclesiastical province of San Salvador comprises the whole country, consisting of the Metropolitan's archbishopric and the following suffragan sees:

- Diocese of Chalatenango
- Diocese of San Miguel
- Diocese of San Vicente
- Diocese of Santa Ana
- Diocese of Santiago de María
- Diocese of Sonsonate
- Diocese of Zacatecoluca

== Bishops ==
=== Ordinaries ===
Bishops of San Salvador

Bishop			Term start	Term end	Appointed by	Ref.
1		José Jorge de Viteri y Ungo (1802–1853)	27 January 1843	5 November 1849	Gregory XVI	
1		José Jorge de Viteri y Ungo (1802–1853)	6 years and 292 days		Gregory XVI	
2	Tomás Miguel Pineda y Saldaña	Tomás Miguel Pineda y Saldaña (1791–1875)	10 March 1853	6 August 1875	Pius IX	
2	Tomás Miguel Pineda y Saldaña	Tomás Miguel Pineda y Saldaña (1791–1875)	22 years and 159 days		Pius IX	
3		José Luis Cárcamo y Rodríguez (1836–1885)	6 August 1875	12 September 1885	Pius IX	
3		José Luis Cárcamo y Rodríguez (1836–1885)	10 years and 27 days		Pius IX	
4	Antonio Adolfo Pérez y Aguilar	Antonio Adolfo Pérez y Aguilar (1839–1926)	13 January 1888	11 February 1913	Leo XIII	
4	Antonio Adolfo Pérez y Aguilar	Antonio Adolfo Pérez y Aguilar (1839–1926)	25 years and 29 days		Leo XIII	

Archbishops of San Salvador

Archbishop			Term start	Term end	Appointed by	Ref.
4	Antonio Adolfo Pérez y Aguilar	Antonio Adolfo Pérez y Aguilar (1839–1926)	11 February 1913	17 April 1926	Pius X	
4	Antonio Adolfo Pérez y Aguilar	Antonio Adolfo Pérez y Aguilar (1839–1926)	13 years and 65 days		Pius X	
5	José Alfonso Belloso y Sánchez	José Alfonso Belloso y Sánchez (1873–1938)	22 December 1927	9 August 1938	Pius XI	
5	José Alfonso Belloso y Sánchez	José Alfonso Belloso y Sánchez (1873–1938)	10 years and 230 days		Pius XI	
6	Luis Chávez y González	Luis Chávez y González (1901–1987)	1 September 1938	3 February 1977	Pius XI	
6	Luis Chávez y González	Luis Chávez y González (1901–1987)	38 years and 155 days		Pius XI	
7	Óscar Arnulfo Romero y Galdámez	Saint; Óscar Arnulfo Romero y Galdámez (1917–1980)	3 February 1977	24 March 1980	Paul VI	
7	Óscar Arnulfo Romero y Galdámez	Saint; Óscar Arnulfo Romero y Galdámez (1917–1980)	3 years and 50 days		Paul VI	
8		Arturo Rivera y Damas; S.D.B. (1923–1994)	28 February 1983	26 November 1994	John Paul II	
8		Arturo Rivera y Damas; S.D.B. (1923–1994)	11 years and 271 days		John Paul II	
9		Fernando Sáenz Lacalle (1930–2022)	22 April 1995	27 December 2008	John Paul II	
9		Fernando Sáenz Lacalle (1930–2022)	13 years and 249 days		John Paul II	
10	José Luis Escobar Alas	José Luis Escobar Alas (1959–)	27 December 2008	Incumbent	Benedict XVI	
10	José Luis Escobar Alas	José Luis Escobar Alas (1959–)	17 years and 307 days		Benedict XVI	

=== Coadjutor Bishops ===
- Mariano Ortiz y Urruela (1866–1873)
- Luis Cárcamo y Rodríguez (1871–1875) (overlapped with Ortiz y Urrela)

=== Auxiliary Bishops ===
- Tomás Miguel Pineda y Saldaña (1848–1853), appointed Bishop here
- Santiago Ricardo Vilanova y Meléndez (1913–1915), appointed Bishop of Santa Ana
- José Alfonso Belloso y Sánchez (1919–1927), appointed Archbishop here
- Pedro Arnoldo Aparicio y Quintanilla, S.D.B. (1946–1948), appointed Bishop of San Vicente
- Rafael Valladares y Argumedo (1956–1961)
- Arturo Rivera y Damas (1960–1977), appointed Bishop of Santiago de María and later Archbishop of San Salvador
- José Eduardo Alvarez Ramírez, C.M. (1965–1969), appointed Bishop of San Miguel
- Saint Óscar Arnulfo Romero y Galdámez (1970–1974), appointed Bishop of Santiago de María
- Marco René Revelo Contreras (1978–1981), appointed Bishop of Santa Ana
- Cardinal Gregorio Rosa Chávez (1982–2022); elevated to Cardinal in 2017

=== Other priests of this diocese who became bishops ===
- Juan Antonio Dueñas y Argumedo, appointed Bishop of San Miguel in 1913
- Francisco José Castro y Ramírez, appointed Bishop of Santiago de María in 1956
- William Ernesto Iraheta Rivera, appointed Bishop of Santiago de María in 2016

== See also ==
- List of Catholic dioceses in El Salvador
