= List of venerated Central Americans and Caribbeans =

This page is a list of venerated Central Americans and Caribbean includes saints, blesseds, venerables, and servants of god, as recognized by the Catholic Church. These people were born, died, or lived their religious life in any of the territories of North America excluding Mexico, Canada and the United States.

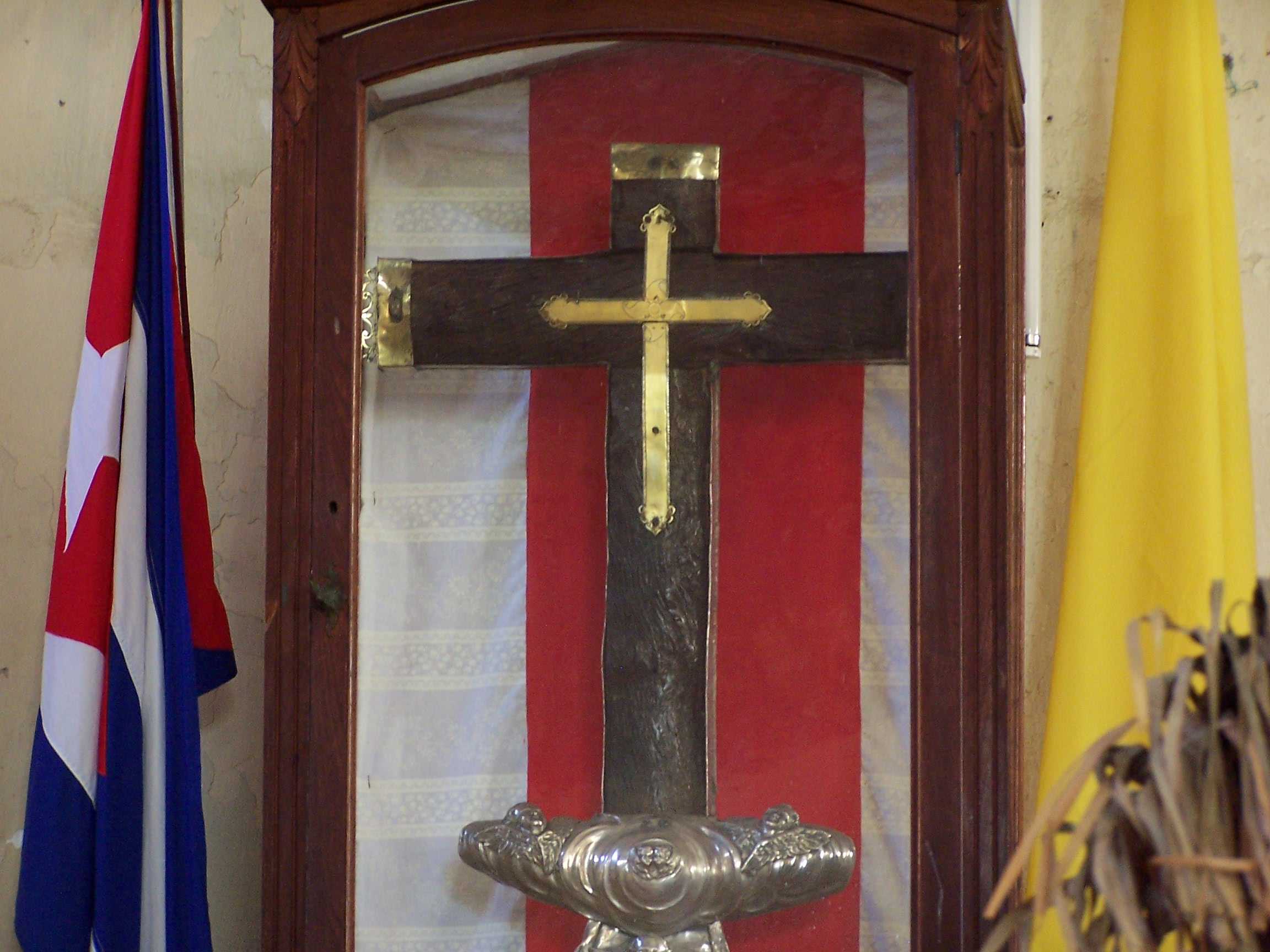
The Cruz de la Parra, in Baracoa, is the last surviving of the 29 crosses planted in the New World by Columbus. It is the oldest tangible evidence of Catholicism in the Americas.

The first unquestioned presence of the Catholic Church in the Americas was in this region, when Christopher Columbus first set foot on San Salvador. The oldest tangible evidence of Catholicism in the New World, the Cruz de la Parra, is kept in what is now Cuba.

== List of saints ==
The following is the list of saints, including the year in which they were canonized and the country or countries with which they are associated. As a fact, in the list Óscar Romero is the only native saint of Central America, and the Caribbean. The rest were Spanish missionaries who carried out their apostolic work in these American countries.

- Louis Bertrand, Dominican priest (Panama and the Caribbean)
  - Declared Venerable: N/A
  - Beatified: 19 July 1608 by Pope Paul V
  - Canonized: 12 April 1671 by Pope Clement X
- Anthony Mary Claret, Archbishop of Santiago (Cuba)
  - Declared Venerable: 6 January 1926
  - Beatified: 25 February 1934 by Pope Pius XI
  - Canonized: 7 May 1950 by Pope Pius XII
- Ezequiel Moreno y Díaz, Augustinian Recollect (Dominican Republic)
  - Declared Venerable: 1 February 1975
  - Beatified: 1 November 1975 by Pope Paul VI
  - Canonized: 11 October 1992 by Pope John Paul II
- Peter of Saint Joseph Betancur, founder of the Order of Betlemitas (Guatemala)
  - Declared Venerable: 25 July 1771
  - Beatified: 22 June 1980 by Pope John Paul II
  - Canonized: 30 July 2002 by Pope John Paul II
- Óscar Romero, Archbishop of San Salvador (El Salvador)
  - Declared Martyr: 3 February 2015
  - Beatified: 23 May 2015 by Cardinal Angelo Amato
  - Canonized: 14 October 2018 by Pope Francis

== List of blesseds ==
- Jacques-Jules Bonnaud, Jesuit priest, martyr in France (Haiti)
  - Declared Martyr: 1 October 1926
  - Beatified: 17 October 1926 by Pope Pius XI
- Encarnación Rosal (born Maria Vicenta Rosal Vasquez), Betlemite Sister (Guatemala)
  - Declared Venerable: 6 April 1995
  - Beatified: 4 May 1997 by Pope John Paul II
- Carlos Manuel Rodríguez, layperson (Puerto Rico)
  - Beatified: 29 April 2001 by Pope John Paul II
- Maria Romero Meneses, Salesian Sister (Costa Rica and Nicaragua)
  - Declared Venerable: 18 December 2000
  - Beatified: 14 April 2002 by Pope John Paul II
- María Dolores Rodríguez Sopeña, foundress of the Sisters of the Catechetical Institute of Dolores Sopeña (active in Cuba 1873–1877)
  - Declared Venerable: 11 July 1992
  - Beatified: 23 March 2003 by Pope John Paul II
- José López Piteira, Augustinian deacon, martyr in Spain (Cuba)
  - Declared Martyr: 1 June 2007
  - Beatified: 28 October 2007 by Cardinal José Saraiva Martins
- José Olallo, Brothers Hospitallers of St. John of God (Cuba)
  - Declared Venerable: 16 December 2006
  - Beatified: 29 November 2008 by Cardinal José Saraiva Martins
- Ciriaco María Sancha y Hervás, cardinal (was a priest in Cuba; later Patriarch of the West Indies, Dominican Republic)
  - Declared Venerable: 28 April 2006
  - Beatified: 18 October 2009 by Archbishop Angelo Amato
- Armando Oscar Valdes, Brothers Hospitallers of St. John of God, martyr in Spain (Cuba)
  - Declared Martyr: 5 July 2013
  - Beatified: 13 October 2013 by Cardinal Angelo Amato
- Stanley Rother, American priest from Oklahoma City area who was a missionary and was martyred by 3 men (Guatemala)
  - Declared Martyr: 1 December 2016
  - Beatified: 23 September 2017 by Cardinal Angelo Amato
- Marcello Maruzzo, priest (Guatemala)
  - Declared Martyr: 9 October 2017
  - Beatified: 27 October 2018 by Cardinal Giovanni Angelo Becciu
- Luis Navarro, layman (Guatemala)
  - Declared Martyr: 9 October 2017
  - Beatified: 27 October 2018 by Cardinal Giovanni Angelo Becciu
- James Alfred Miller (Leo William) [Santiago], professed religious of the Brothers of the Christian Schools (De La Salle Brothers); martyr (Guatemala)
  - Declared Martyr: 7 November 2018
  - Beatified: 7 December 2019 by Cardinal José Luis Lacunza Maestrojuán
- José María Gran Cirera and 9 Companions, laypersons of the diocese of Quiché (Guatemala)
  - Declared Martyr: 23 January 2020
  - Beatified: 23 April 2021 by Archbishop Francisco Montecillo Padilla
- Rutilio Grande Garcia, Jesuit priest (El Salvador)
  - Declared Venerable: 21 February 2020
  - Beatified: 22 January 2022 by Cardinal Gregorio Rosa Chávez
- Manuel Solórzano, layman (El Salvador)
  - Declared Venerable: 21 February 2020
  - Beatified: 22 January 2022 by Cardinal Gregorio Rosa Chávez
- Nelson Lemus, layperson (El Salvador)
  - Declared Venerable: 21 February 2020
  - Beatified: 22 January 2022 by Cardinal Gregorio Rosa Chávez
- Cosme Spessotto, Franciscan priest (El Salvador)
  - Declared Venerable: 26 May 2020
  - Beatified: 22 January 2022 by Cardinal Gregorio Rosa Chávez

== List of venerables ==
- Leo Dupont, layman (Martinique)
  - Declared Venerable: 21 March 1983
- Maria Antonia Paris, foundress of the Claretian Sisters (Cuba)
  - Declared Venerable: 23 December 1993
- Pierre Toussaint, layman (Haiti)
  - Declared Venerable: 17 December 1996
- Isabel Larrañaga Ramírez, foundress of the Sisters of Charity of the Sacred Heart of Jesus (Cuba)
  - Declared Venerable: 28 June 1999
- Jerónimo Usera, priest (Cuba)
  - Declared Venerable: 28 June 1999
- Félix Varela, priest (Cuba)
  - Declared Venerable: 14 March 2012
- Rafael Cordero Molina, layperson (Puerto Rico)
  - Declared Venerable: 9 December 2013
- Joseph Vandor, priest (Cuba)
  - Declared Venerable: 20 January 2017
- María Consuelo Sanjurjo Santos, foundress of the Congregation of the Servants of Mary, Ministers to the Sick (Puerto Rico)
  - Declared Venerable: 15 January 2019
- Augustin Arnaud Pagès (Nymphas Victorin), professed religious of the Brothers of the Christian Schools (De La Salle Brothers) (Haute-Loire, France – San Juan, Puerto Rico, Dominican Republic)
  - Declared Venerable: 6 April 2019
- Mary Elizabeth Lange (Cuba) (Haiti) nun, founder of the Oblate Sisters of Providence
  - Declared Venerable: 22 June 2023

== List of Servants of God ==
- Antonio de Valdivieso O.P., bishop and protomartyr for the defense of the Native Americans (Nicaragua)
- Mariano Dubon Alonso, secular priest (Nicaragua)
- Remigio Salazar y Amador, secular priest (Nicaragua)
- Casimir Cypher (born Michael Jerome Cypher), Conventual Franciscan priest (Honduras)
- Moises Gonzalez Crespo, Augustinian priest (Panama)
- José Atiliano Franco Arita (1950–1990), married layperson of the Diocese of Santa Rosa de Copán; Martyr (Honduras)
- Ana María Moreno Castillo [Niña Anita] (1887–1977), layperson of the Diocese of Chitré (Panama)
- Moisés Cisneros Rodríguez (1945–1991), professed religious of the Marist Brothers of the Schools; Martyr (Guatemala)
- Fernando González Saborío (1927–1957), priest of the Diocese of Tilaran-Liberia (Costa Rica)
- María Isabel de Jesús (Marisa) Acuña Arias (1941–1954), child of the Archdiocese of San Jose de Costa Rica (Costa Rica)
- Juan Morrera Coll (Casiano María of Madrid) (1892–1965), professed priest of the Capuchin Franciscans (Costa Rica)
- Victor Manuel Sanabria Martínez (1898–1952), Archbishop of San Jose de Costa Rica (Costa Rica)
- Eduardo Tomás Boza Masvidal (1915–2003), titular bishop Vinda, auxiliary bishop of San Cristóbal de la Habana (Cuba)
- Adolfo Rodríguez Herrera (1924–2003), archbishop of Camagüey (Cuba)
- Zilda Arns Neumann (1934–2010), married Layperson of the Archdiocese of Curitiba (Haiti)
- Luis Sánchez Pacheco (1696), professed priest, Franciscan Friars Minor (Cuba)
- Tiburcio De Osorio (+1712-1715), professed priest, Franciscan Friars Minor (Cuba)
- María Josefa Yáñez González Del Valle (1917–1960), professed religious (Cuba)
- Santos Álvarez Molaguero (1904–1936), priest of the archdiocese of Madrid (Cuba)
- Salvador Riera Pau (1883–1936), priest of the diocese of Girona (Cuba)
- Juan Antonio Abreu Espinal (1914–1977), priest of the diocese of Higüey (Dominican Republic)
- Giovanni Francesco Fantino Falco (1867–1939), priest of the diocese of La Vega (Dominican Republic)
- Severiano Arrieta Gorrochategui (1907–1975), professed priest, Passionists (Dominican Republic)
- Emiliano Tardif (1928–1999), professed priest, founder, Community of the Servants of the Living Christ (Dominican Republic)
- Louis-Gaston de Sonis (1825–1887), layperson of the diocese of Chartres; married; member, Secular Carmelites (Guadeloupe)
- Gordon Anthony Pantin (1929–2000), archbishop of Port of Spain, Holy Ghost Father (Trinidad & Tobago)
- Luis Chávez (1901–1987), archbishop of San Salvador (El Salvador)
- Clara Ellerker (1875–1949), founder, Carmelite Sisters of “Corpus Christi” (Trinidad & Tobago)
- Aristides Calvani Silva (1918–1986), layperson of the archdiocese of Caracas; married (Trinidad & Tobago)
- Marguerite-Henriette Lebray (1759–1794), professed religious, Madelonnettes (Haiti)
- Ángel Baraibar Moreno (1910–1936), layperson of the archdiocese of Toledo (Puerto Rico)
- María Belen Guzmán Florit (1897–1993), founder, Dominican Sisters of Fatima (Puerto Rico)
- Albertina Ramírez Martínez (1898–1979), founder, Missionary Servants of Christ the King (Nicaragua)
- Odorico D’Andrea (1916–1990), professed priest, Franciscan Friars Minor (Nicaragua)
- Bruno Martínez Sacedo (1907–1972), professed priest, Piarists (Nicaragua)
- Antonio Guales Hernández (1941–1981), layperson of the apostolic vicariate of Izabal; married (Honduras)
- Diomira Ludovica Romana Crispi (1879–1974), founder, Sisters Oblates to Divine Love (Costa Rica)

== Other open causes ==
Others have been proposed for beatification, and may have active groups supporting their causes. These include:

- Four U.S. missionaries raped and murdered by a Salvadoran government death squad in 1980:
  - Maura Clarke, Maryknoll Sister
  - Ita Ford, Maryknoll Sister
  - Dorothy Kazel, Ursuline Sister
  - Jean Donovan, laywoman
- Eduardo De La Fuente Serrano (1948–2009), priest of the archdiocese of Madrid (Cuba),
- Mariano Arroyo Merino (1932–2009), priest of the archdiocese of Havana (Cuba),
- Luís Ramón Peña González [Papilín] (1936–1960), seminarian of the diocese of Higüey (Dominican Republic)
- James Arthur MacKinnon (1932–1965), priest of the Scarboro Foreign Mission Society (Dominican Republic)
- Florinda Soriano de Muñoz [Mamá Tingó] (1921–1974), layperson of the archdiocese of Santo Domingo; married (Dominican Republic)
- Ernesto Goyeneche Echarri (1910–1995), priest of the archdiocese of Santo Domingo (Dominican Republic)
- Theresa Egan (1927–2000), professed religious, Sisters of Saint Joseph of Cluny (Saint Lucia)
- Eliseo Castaño de Vega (1925–1991), priest of the Congregation of the Mission (Puerto Rico)
- Mariano Blanco (1937–1979), professed religious, Marist Brothers of the Schools (Nicaragua)
- Felipe Barreda Rodríguez (1931–1983), layperson of the diocese of Estelí; married (Nicaragua)
- María Eugenia García de Barreda (1933–1983), layperson of the diocese of Estelí; married (Nicaragua)
- Tomás Zavaleta Martínez (1947–1987), professed religious, Franciscan Friars Minor (Nicaragua)
- Maureen Courtney (1944–1990), professed religious, Congregation of Saint Agnes (Nicaragua)
- Teresa de Jesús Rosales Dixon (1965–1990), professed religious, Congregation of Saint Agnes (Nicaragua)
- Jenny Flor Altamirano Rivera (1969–1995), professed religious, Congregation of Saint Agnes (Nicaragua)
- Servando Cantillano Sevilla (1952–1998), layperson of the diocese of Matagalpa; married (Nicaragua)
- Agustín Hombach (1879–1933), priest of the Congregation of the Mission (Vincentians); archbishop of Tegucigalpa (Honduras)
- Arnulfo Gómez Martínez (1975), layperson of the diocese of Juticalpa (Honduras)
- Fausto Cruz (1975), layperson of the diocese of Juticalpa (Honduras)
- Francisco Colindres (1975), layperson of the diocese of Juticalpa (Honduras)
- Alejandro Figueroa (1975), layperson of the diocese of Juticalpa (Honduras)
- Iván Betancur Betancur (1940–1975), priest of the archdiocese of Medellín (Honduras)
- Oscar Ovidio Ortiz Ruiz (1975), layperson of the diocese of Juticalpa (Honduras)
- Juan Benito Montoya Cárcamo (1975), layperson of the diocese of Juticalpa (Honduras)
- Roque Ramón Andrade Madrid (1975), layperson of the diocese of Juticalpa (Honduras)
- Lincoln Coleman Fuentes (1975), layperson of the diocese of Juticalpa (Honduras)
- Bernardo Rivera Irías (1975), layperson of the diocese of Juticalpa (Honduras)
- María Elena Bolívar Vargas (1975), layperson of the archdiocese of Medellín (Honduras)
- Ruth Argentina García Mallorquín (1975), layperson of the archdiocese of Tegucigalpa (Honduras)
- Máximo Aguilera (1975), layperson of the diocese of Juticalpa (Honduras)
- Amparo Sabina Castillo Nicholson (1956–1990), professed religious, Missionary Daughters of the Holy Mother of Light (Belize)
- Jesús Héctor Gallego Herrera (1938–1971), priest of the diocese of Santiago de Veraguas (Panama)
- Nikolaas van Kleef (1937–1989), priest of the Congregation of the Mission (Vincentians) (Panama)
- Marco Aurelio Fonseca Calvo (1949–1991), professed priest, Salesians of Don Bosco (Costa Rica)

== See also ==
- Roman Catholicism in North America
- List of American saints and beatified people
- List of Canadian Roman Catholic saints
- List of Mexican Saints
- List of Brazilian Saints
- List of South American Saints
- List of saints of the Canary Islands
