= Nelson Lemus =

Blessed Nelson Rutilio Lemus Chávez

Martyr
- Born: 10 November 1960; El Paisnal, El Salvador
- Died: 12 March 1977 (aged 16); Between Aguilares and El Paisnal, El Salvador
- Venerated in: Catholic Church
- Beatified: 22 January 2022, Plaza Divino Salvador del Mundo, San Salvador, El Salvador by Gregorio Rosa Cardinal Chávez
- Feast: 12 March
- Attributes: Palm

Nelson Rutilio Lemus Chávez (10 November 1960 – 12 March 1977) was a Salvadoran Catholic who was active during the 20th century unrest in the country.

He was an active participant in his local parish and was often involved in helping others to read the Bible. He was also the one that would ring the church bells for Mass and helped his local parish priest. Lemus was slain in 1977 on a dirt road amidst sugarcane fields en route to Mass alongside Manuel Solórzano and the Jesuit priest Rutilio Grande García after three Salvadoran soldiers ambushed them.

Lemus was beatified in 2022 in San Salvador alongside his two companions and the slain priest Cosma Spessotto.

== Life ==
Nelson Rutilio Lemus Chávez was born on 10 November 1960 in El Paisnal in the San Salvador Department as the eldest of eight sisters and one brother; his mother was a housewife and his father worked at the local post office. He was epileptic since his childhood.

His parents had been threatened several times due to their participation in the Delegates of the Word movement in their local parish. Lemus, meanwhile, secured a position to ring the church bells for Mass and he often helped his parish priest in his duties around the church. He also contributed to several pastoral activities at the parish and would help others to read the Bible. His sister, Dinora Lemus (who was nine when her brother was murdered), recalled later how her brother had "the gift of helping" and was diligent in his studies at school. In his free time, Lemus liked to raise a piscuchas on occasion with his friends.

Lemus was picked up on 12 March 1977 after he delivered firewood to his godmother and accompanied the Jesuit priest Rutilio Grande and his companion Manuel Solórzano to attend evening Mass and then to recite the novena to Saint Joseph. But three Salvadoran soldiers ambushed them on a dirt road amidst a sugarcane field (around a kilometer from Aguilares) and riddled their white and black Volkswagen with machine-gun fire around 5:00pm. Solórzano attempted to shield both men as ten bullets riddled him and tore his arm off. Lemus himself has five bullet holes in his head while Grande had been shot eighteen times since he was the main target. News about the three deaths did not come until sometime between 5:30 and 6:00pm. The Archbishop of San Salvador Óscar Arnulfo Romero y Galdámez presided over their funeral Mass at the archdiocesan cathedral.

== Beatification ==
The beatification process for Lemus and his two companions commenced after the Congregation for the Causes of Saints issued the official "nihil obstat" (no objections) edict which would allow for the San Salvador archdiocese to conduct an investigation into their lives and holiness. The cause would be determine if the three had died "in odium fidei" (in hatred of the faith) which would mean that no miracle would be required for their beatification. The process was initiated in San Salvador on 8 January 2016 and was concluded a few months later on 16 August. However, a supplementary process was initiated, spanning from 17 March 2017 until the following 6 June; the C.C.S. in Rome validated both processes as having complied with their regulations on 2 March 2018.

Meanwhile, the postulation (officials spearheading the cause) drafted and submitted the "Positio" dossier to the C.C.S. for further investigation. This led to the commission of theologians approving the cause on 19 September 2019 and the cardinal and bishop members likewise issuing their approval on 18 February 2020. Pope Francis, on 21 February 2020, signed a decree that permitted their beatification, however, the original tentative August date had been postponed due to the COVID-19 pandemic. The beatification was celebrated on 22 January 2022, with Cardinal Gregorio Rosa Chávez presiding over the rite on the Pope's behalf.

The current postulator for the cause is the Jesuit priest Pascual Cebollada Silvestre.
