= Manuel Solórzano =

Blessed Manuel Solórzano
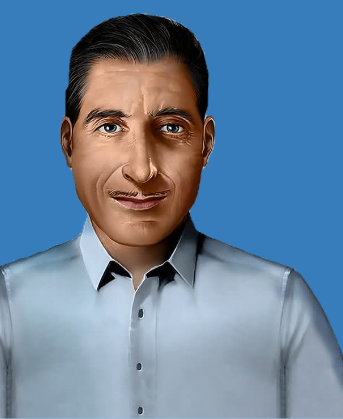

Martyr
- Born: 1905; Suchitoto, Cuscatlán, El Salvador
- Died: 12 March 1977 (aged 71-72); Between Aguilares and El Paisnal, San Salvador, El Salvador
- Venerated in: Roman Catholic Church
- Beatified: 22 January 2022, Plaza Divino Salvador del Mundo, San Salvador, El Salvador by Cardinal Gregorio Rosa Chávez
- Feast: 12 March

Manuel Solórzano (1905 – 12 March 1977) was a Salvadoran Catholic who was an active participant in his local parish and was close with its priest, Rutilio Grande García. He was slain alongside Grande and the teenager Nelson Lemus in 1977 on a dirt road after he tried to shield both men when armed Salvadoran soldiers killed them.

He was beatified on 22 January 2022 alongside his two companions.

== Life ==
Manuel Solórzano was born sometime in 1905 in Suchitoto. He married Eleuteria Antonia Guillén and the couple had ten children together. In Aguilares he sold seeds and cattle to make a living and had moved to that town for work reasons. He was also an active participant in the life of his local parish and was active in matters related to evangelization efforts where he got to know the local pastor, Rutilio Grande García.

Solórzano was murdered when Salvadoran soldiers killed him alongside teenager Nelson Lemus and Grande as the three were about to attend Mass that evening and was shot dead at around 5:00pm. The armed soldiers ambushed them in the middle of sugarcane fields and riddled their automobile with bullets as it travelled from Aguilares to El Paisnal. The three had headed to continue the novena to Saint Joseph after Mass and Grande at that time had received death threats for his provocative sermons. In his final moments, he tried to cover Grande and Lemus and ten bullets hit him and had almost torn off his arm in the process.

== Beatification ==
The beatification process for Solórzano and his two companions commenced after the Congregation for the Causes of Saints issued the official "nihil obstat" (no objections) edict which would allow for the San Salvador archdiocese to conduct an investigation into their lives and holiness. But the cause would be determine if the three had died "in odium fidei" (in hatred of the faith) which would mean that no miracle would be required for their beatification. The process was conducted the following morning on 8 January 2016 and was concluded a few months later on 16 August. However, a secondary supplementary process was initiated in the archdiocese, spanning from 17 March 2017 until three months later on 6 June; the C.C.S. in Rome validated both processes as having complied with their regulations on 2 March 2018.

Meanwhile, the postulation (officials in charge of the cause) compiled and submitted the "Positio" dossier to the C.C.S. for further investigation. This led to nine theologians approving the material on 19 September 2019 and the cardinal and bishop members following suit on 18 February 2020. Pope Francis, on 21 February 2020, signed a decree that permitted their beatification, however, the original tentative August date had been postponed due to the COVID-19 pandemic. The beatification was celebrated on 22 January 2022, with Cardinal Gregorio Rosa Chávez presiding on the Pope's behalf.

The current postulator for the cause is the Jesuit priest Pascual Cebollada Silvestre.
