= List of protomartyrs =

A protomartyr (Koine Greek, πρῶτος prôtos 'first' + μάρτυς mártus 'martyr') is the first Christian martyr in a country or among a particular group, such as a religious order. Similarly, the phrase the Protomartyr (with no other qualification of country or region) can mean Saint Stephen, the first martyr of the Christian Church. Saint Thecla the Protomartyr, the first female martyr of the Christian Church, is known as "apostle and protomartyr among women".

Name	Year	Place	first...
Stephen	c. 34	Jerusalem	—
Thecla	1st century	Iconium	among women
First Martyrs of the Church of Rome	64	Rome	in Rome
Sandukht	1st century	Armenia	in Armenia
Polyeuctus	259	Melitene	in Melitene
Alban	3rd/4th c.	St Albans	in Great Britain
Denis of Paris	3rd century	Paris	in Gallia Lugdunensis
Vincent of Saragossa	304	Valencia	in Spain
Rajden the First-Martyr	457	Tsromi	from Georgia / under the Sasanian Empire
Odran	5th c.	Ireland	in Ireland
Boniface	754	Germany	in German lands
Adalbert of Prague	997	Prussia	in the Duchy of Poland
Five Martyr Brothers	1003	Poland	in Poland and Camaldolese
Gerard of Csanád	1046	Buda	Patron saint of Hungary
Theodore the Varangian and his son John	10th c.	Kiev	in all Rus lands
The Franciscan protomartyrs	1220	Morocco	of the Franciscan order
Peter of Verona	1252	Italy	of the Dominican Order
Child Martyrs of Tlaxcala	1527	Mexico	in the Americas
Juan de Padilla	1542	Kansas	in what is now the United States
Luis Cáncer	1549	Tampa Bay, Florida	in Florida
Antonio de Valdivieso	1549	León	in Nicaragua
Peter Baptist and companions	1627	Nagasaki	in Japan
Philip of Jesus	1627	Nagasaki	from Mexico
Lorenzo Ruiz	1637	Nagasaki	from the Philippines
Andrew of Phu Yen	1641	Kẻ Chàm, Vietnam	in Vietnam
André de Soveral	1645	Canguaretama	in Brazil
Francis Ferdinand de Capillas	1648	Fujian, China	in the Chinese Empire
Pedro Calungsod	1672	Tumon, Guam	in Guam
Devasahayam	1752	Aralvaimozhi, Travancore	in India
Juvenaly	1796	Quinhagak, Alaska	in Alaska
Andrew Kim Taegon	1846	Seoul	in Korea
James Hannington	1885	Uganda	in Eastern Equatorial Africa
Peter Chanel	1841	Futuna	in Oceania
Vladimir Bogoyavlensky	1918	Moscow	under the Soviet Union
Marcello Maruzzo and Luis Navarro	1981	Los Amates	in Guatemala
