= Catholic Church in the Americas =

Catholic Church in the Americas may refer to:

- Catholic Church in North America
- Catholic Church in Latin America
