= Rutilio Grande =

Salvadorean Jesuit Priest and Community Leader

Blessed Rutilio Grande S.J.
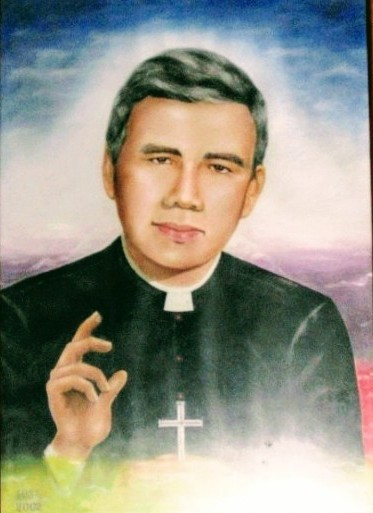
- Church: Roman Catholic Church

Orders
- Ordination: 30 July 1959 by Demetrio Mansilla Reoyo

Personal details
- Born: Rutilio Grande García; 5 July 1928 El Paisnal, El Salvador
- Died: 12 March 1977 (aged 48) Aguilares, El Salvador
- Parents: Salvador Grande; Cristina García
- Education: Externado San José

Sainthood
- Feast day: 12 March
- Venerated in: Roman Catholic Church
- Beatified: 22 January 2022; Plaza Divino Salvador del Mundo, San Salvador, El Salvador by Cardinal Gregorio Rosa Chávez
- Attributes: Priest's cassock Palm

Rutilio Grande García, SJ (5 July 1928 in El Paisnal – 12 March 1977 in Aguilares) was a Salvadoran Jesuit priest assassinated in 1977 by Salvadoran security forces. He was the first priest assassinated before the Salvadoran Civil War started and was a close friend of Archbishop Óscar Romero. His beatification, through his status as a martyr, was approved by Pope Francis on 21 February 2020, with the ceremony being held in San Salvador on 22 January 2022.

== Life and work ==
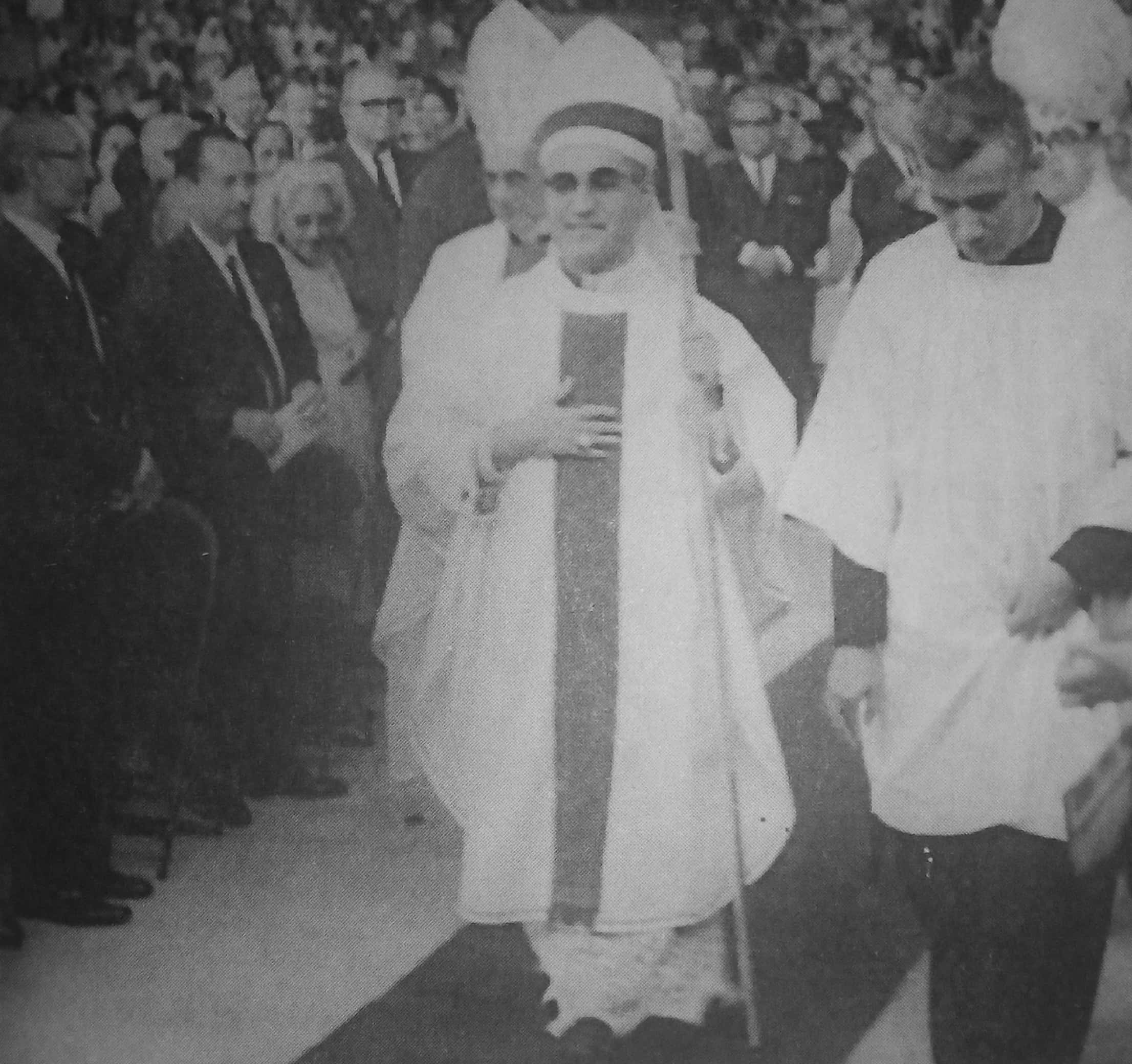
Oscar Romero (centre) and Rutilio Grande (Right side) in 1977

Rutilio Grande was born on 5 July 1928, the youngest of 7 children, to a poor family in El Paisnal, El Salvador. His parents, Salvador Grande and Cristina García, divorced when he was young, and he was raised by his older brother and grandmother, a devout and strong Catholic woman. At the age of 12, Rutilio was noticed by Archbishop Luis Chávez y González during his annual visit to their village and invited to attend the high school seminary in San Salvador, the capital of the country.

At the age of 17, following his final year in the high school seminary (minor seminary), Grande entered the Jesuit process of formation called the novitiate. Thus began a period of time outside of El Salvador. Grande first travelled to Caracas, Venezuela, since there was no Jesuit novitiate in Central America. Initially, Grande felt called to the Oriental missions of the church. After two years in Caracas, he pronounced his vows of poverty, chastity and obedience and then travelled to Quito, Ecuador, to study the humanities, which he completed in 1950. The following three years were spent as a professor in a minor seminary in El Salvador, where he taught sacred history, history of the Americas and of El Salvador, and writing.

Grande continued his studies for the priesthood at the major seminary of San José de la Montaña, where he became friends with Romero, a fellow student. Grande was ordained a priest in mid-1959 in the city of Oña, in Spain. He returned to Spain in 1962 to complete studies left undone due to his physical and mental struggles. In 1963, he attended Lumen Vitae Institute in Brussels, Belgium, where he studied new directions in pastoral ministry inspired by Vatican II. He was particularly influenced by his experiences of an inclusive liturgy which insisted upon the widest and deepest lay participation possible at that time. As his biographer states, "Very probably at this moment his fundamental lines of pastoral action matured. Certainly, a part of this epoch in pastoral theological development was to always look for the greatest participation possible by the base or least empowered part of a community, and to never proceed autonomously or without hearing the community."

He returned to El Salvador in 1965 and was appointed director of social action projects at the seminary in San Salvador, a position he held for nine years. From 1965 to 1970, he was also prefect of discipline and professor of pastoral theology. He taught a variety of subjects, including liturgy, catechesis, pastoral theology, and introduction to the mystery of Christ (philosophy). He also fully utilized the social sciences in an effort to understand the reality within which he lived and ministered. During this time, Grande initiated a process of formation for seminarians which included pastoral "immersions" in the communities they would someday serve. This included time with people listening to their problems and their reality. Grande put it this way, "the first contact with the people was to be characterized by a human encounter; to try to enter into their reality in order to leave with common reality."

This innovative aspect of formation lasted for a year or two, and then the bishops asked that seminarians be sent back to their dioceses during their breaks so they could be supervised and relationships with the bishop could be better established. Grande eventually had a falling out with the leadership of the seminary over his methods for formation and evangelization. He disagreed with the insistence that seminarians separate their intellectual formation from their pastoral formation. Grande sought equilibrium between prayer, study, and apostolic activity.

Shortly after this falling out with church leadership and reconciliation over his criticism of the seminary system, Grande would attend the Latin American Pastoral Institute (IPLA) in Quito, Ecuador, beginning in 1972. There, he learned the method of conscientization of Paulo Freire and combined it with the pastoral theology of the Medellín Conference (a meeting of Latin American bishops in 1968). Attendance at this Institute was a turning point for Grande, for he was finally able to integrate Vatican II, the teaching of the Latin American bishops, and his own reality in El Salvador in a ministry that had explosive consequences.

Upon his return to El Salvador in 1973, Grande embarked on a team-based Jesuit evangelization "Mission" to Aguilares, El Salvador. Deeply engaged in the lives of the people he served, Grande led with the Gospel but did not shy away from speaking on social and political issues, which had profound consequences for the church. He could be credited with promoting a "pastoral" liberation ministry that began in scripture and allowed lay people in El Salvador to work for social transformation without resorting to Marxist analysis. Grande was prophetic on issues of land reform, the relationship of rich and poor, liturgical inclusiveness, workers' rights, and making the Catholic faith real for very poor people. He was fond of saying that "the Gospel must grow little feet" if Christ is not to remain in the clouds. Grande had been master of ceremonies at Romero's installation as bishop of Santiago de María in 1975 and remained a friend and confidant of Romero, whom he inspired through his ministry and through the ultimate sacrifice he made.

Grande had served in the parish of Aguilares off and on from 1967 to 1977. He was responsible, along with many other Jesuits, for establishing Christian base communities (CEBs, in Spanish) and training "Delegates of the Word" to lead them. Grande spoke against the injustices at the hands of an oppressive government and dedicated his life's work to organizing the impoverished, marginalized rural farmers of El Salvador as they demanded respect for their rights. Local landowners saw the organization of the peasants as a threat to their power.

Grande challenged the government in its response to actions he saw as attempts to harass and silence Salvadoran priests. Mario Bernal Londono, a Colombian priest serving in El Salvador, had been kidnapped January 28, 1977 – allegedly by guerrillas – in front of the Apopa church near San Salvador, together with a parishioner who was safely released. Bernal was deported by the Salvadoran government. On 13 February 1977, Grande preached a sermon that came to be called "the Apopa sermon", denouncing the government's expulsion of Londono, an action that some later believed helped to provoke Grande's murder:

I am fully aware that very soon the Bible and the Gospels will not be allowed to cross the border. All that will reach us will be the covers since all the pages are subversive – against sin, it is said. So that if Jesus crosses the border at Chalatenango, they will not allow him to enter. They would accuse him, the man-God ... of being an agitator, of being a Jewish foreigner, who confuses the people with exotic and foreign ideas, anti-democratic ideas, and, that is, against the minorities. Ideas against God, because this is a clan of Cain's. Brothers, they would undoubtedly crucify him again. And they have said so.

== Death and aftermath ==
On 12 March 1977, Rutilio Grande was assassinated by Salvadoran security forces, just outside his hometown, suffering martyrdom for the people he served and loved.

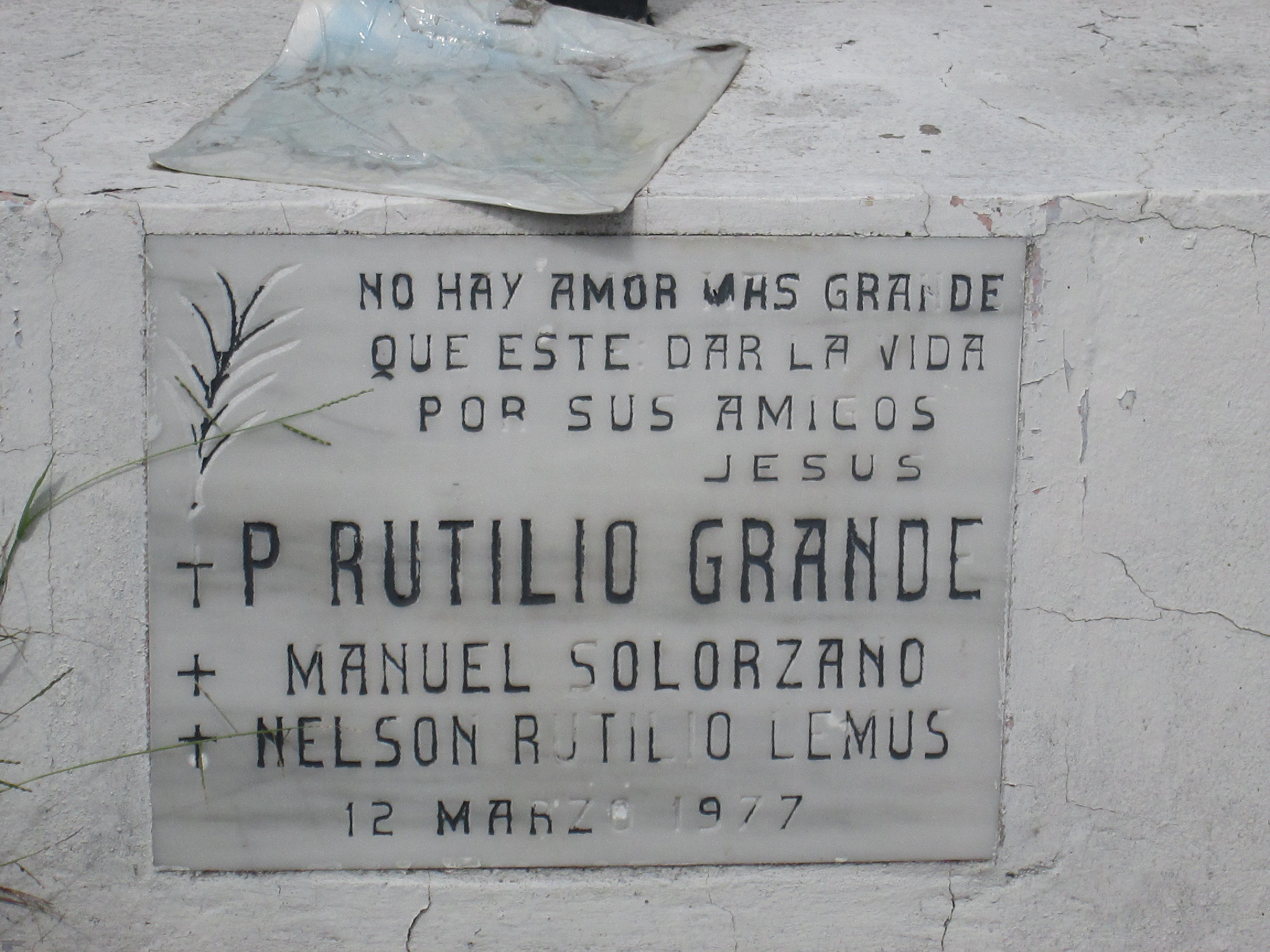
Memorial plaque at the assassination site. The epitaph quotes Jesus’ words in John 13:15, and translates to “Greater love than this no man hath, that a man lay down his life for his friends.”

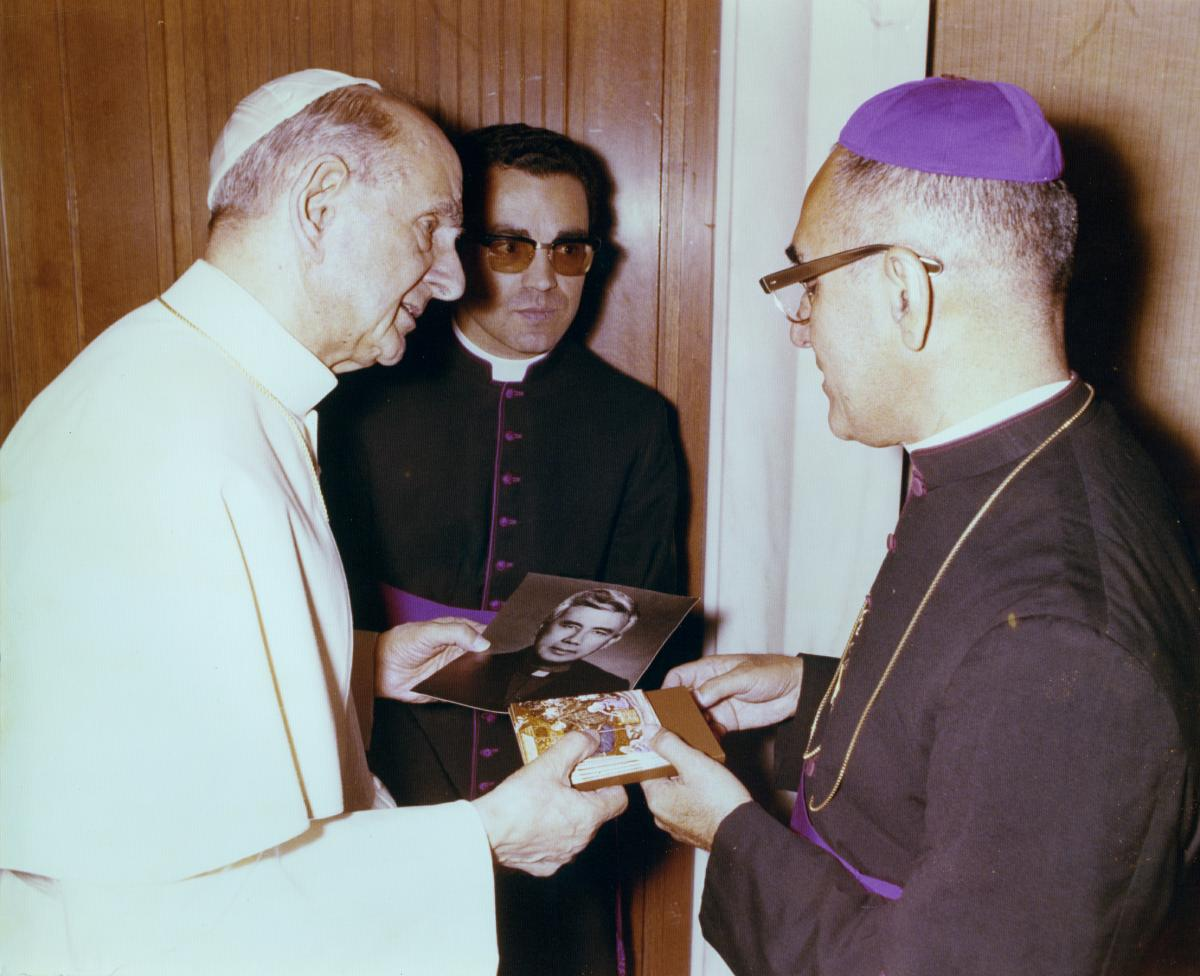
Monsignor Romero, right, meeting Pope Paul VI six weeks before the latter's death. Romero is handing him a photo of Rutilio Grande, assassinated the year before.

On that day, shortly after 5:00 p.m., a Volkswagen Safari left the small town of Aguilares, an hour north of San Salvador. Inside were three passengers: 72-year-old Manuel Solórzano, 16-year-old named Nelson Lemus, and Rutilio Grande himself. While exiting the town near the train tracks, the vehicle stopped to give three small children a ride. Their destination was Grande's birthplace of El Paisnal, some three miles away, where Grande was to continue a novena for the celebration of the feast day of Saint Joseph, the town's patron. As the local church in the town's central plaza tolled its bell to gather people, Grande and the others were still driving along the narrow, dusty road. As they passed the small village of Los Mangos, the children recalled seeing groups of two or three men on the banks of the small canals lining either side of the road. Behind Grande's vehicle was a small pickup truck that had trailed them from Aguilares. In a low voice, Grande is quoted as saying, “We must do what God wants”. As the pickup came closer to the Volkswagen, a hail of bullets rained on the car. The later autopsy indicated that Grande was killed by twelve bullets from both the front and rear of the vehicle; the weapons and ammunition used were common to the local police. The bullets from the front hit Grande's jaw and neck and penetrated his skull; from the rear and left, he was shot through the lower back and pelvis. When the bodies were found, it appeared that Solórzano tried in vain to shield Grande with his body, while "Nelson sat quietly in his seat with a bullet in his forehead." The three children who had been given a ride were screaming in the back of the vehicle. A man whom they recognised ordered them to leave, which they anxiously did. They passed by the bodies of the three men, not even seeing them. As they ran down the road towards El Paisnal, they heard one final shot. Covered in blood and dirt, they did not stop running until they had entered the town.

Immediately, news of the murders was transmitted to Óscar Romero, the reigning Archbishop of San Salvador, as well as to the local Provincial of the Society of Jesus, who also lived in the capital. Romero, his auxiliary bishop Rivera y Damas, and three Jesuits from the Provincial office all headed to El Paisnal. At 7:00 p.m., President Arturo Armando Molina called Romero to offer his condolences, promising a thorough investigation; newspapers later reported that Romero had called the president first. This discrepancy between the narratives of the government and the Church continued to be a developing theme throughout the period of violence that followed, ending in 1992.

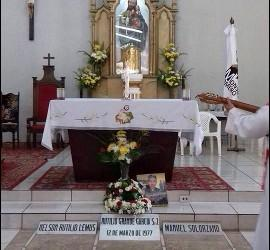
Graves of Grande (centre), Lemus (left) and Solórzano (right) fronting the altar, in the church of El Paisnal, 2019. It is the same spot where their bodies were first laid the night after their murder.

The three bodies were covered in sheets and laid before the altar of the church in El Paisnal, and the Jesuit Provincial asked that a Mass be offered that “gives hope to the community and avoids the temptations to hatred or revenge.” At 10:30 pm that same evening, Archbishop Romero himself said the Mass, which lasted until midnight. The next morning, responding to a radio announcement by Romero, streams of peasants began walking to El Paisnal for a 9:00 am memorial Mass and to mourn the death of their beloved priest and his friends. The next Sunday, Romero decreed that a "single Mass” in memory of Grande at San Salvador Cathedral was to be the only Mass said that day throughout the country. This drew criticism from other Church officials, but more than 150 priests concelebrated the Mass as over 100,000 people came to the cathedral to hear Romero speak, wherein he called for an end to the violence. During the funeral procession that would ultimately inter Grande and the other two under the foot of the altar of the church in El Paisnal, the slogan could be heard: "Rutilio's walk with El Paisnal is like Christ's journey with the Cross."

After the Mass on 12 March, Romero had spent hours listening to stories of suffering local peasant farmers, and the rest of his time in prayer. The next morning, after meeting with his priests and advisers, Romero announced that he would not attend any state occasions nor meet with President Molina – both traditional activities for his longtime predecessor – until the death was investigated. As no investigation ever was conducted, this decision meant that Romero never attended state occasions throughout his three-year reign as archbishop. He also appointed another Jesuit, Jon de Cortina, to succeed Grande as parish priest. Romero's sermon said, in part:

“The true reason for [Grande's] death was his prophetic and pastoral efforts to raise the consciousness of the people throughout his parish. Father Grande, without offending and forcing himself upon his flock in the practice of their religion, was only slowly forming a genuine community of faith, hope, and love among them, he was making them aware of their dignity as individuals, of their basic rights. His was an effort toward comprehensive human development. This post-Vatican Council ecclesiastical effort is certainly not agreeable to everyone, because it awakens the consciousness of the people. It is work that disturbs many; and to end it, it was necessary to liquidate its proponent. In our case, Father Rutilio Grande.”

== Canonization process ==
The canonization process for Grande opened in March 2014 by the Archbishop of San Salvador, José Luis Escobar, and was ceremonially closed on 16 August 2016. The documents concerning the process were submitted to Rome, where it is being handled by the Jesuits. In March 2018, the Salvadoran Ambassador to the Holy See noted that Pope Francis was a strong advocate of the canonization of Rutilio Grande, whose path to sainthood had been delayed by "misunderstandings and slander." Early in 2019, when Pope Francis was asked on the cause for Rutilio's beatification, he replied that "well informed people tell me that the declaration of martyrdom is going well."

The Holy See announced on 21 February 2020, that Pope Francis, having met with the prefect of the Congregation for the Causes of Saints, formally approved the beatification of Father Grande and his two lay companions, though the rite was delayed due to the COVID-19 pandemic, hence a tentative date of August 2020 was scrapped. The beatification Mass was eventually celebrated on 22 January 2022, with Cardinal Gregorio Rosa Chávez presiding on the Pope's behalf. Grande two lay companions who were killed with him Nelson Rutilio Lemus, a 16 year old who often assisted at Mass, and Manuel Solórzano, a 72-year-old catechist, were beautified as well. Franciscan Father Cosma Spessotto would be beautified alongside them as well.

== Legacy ==
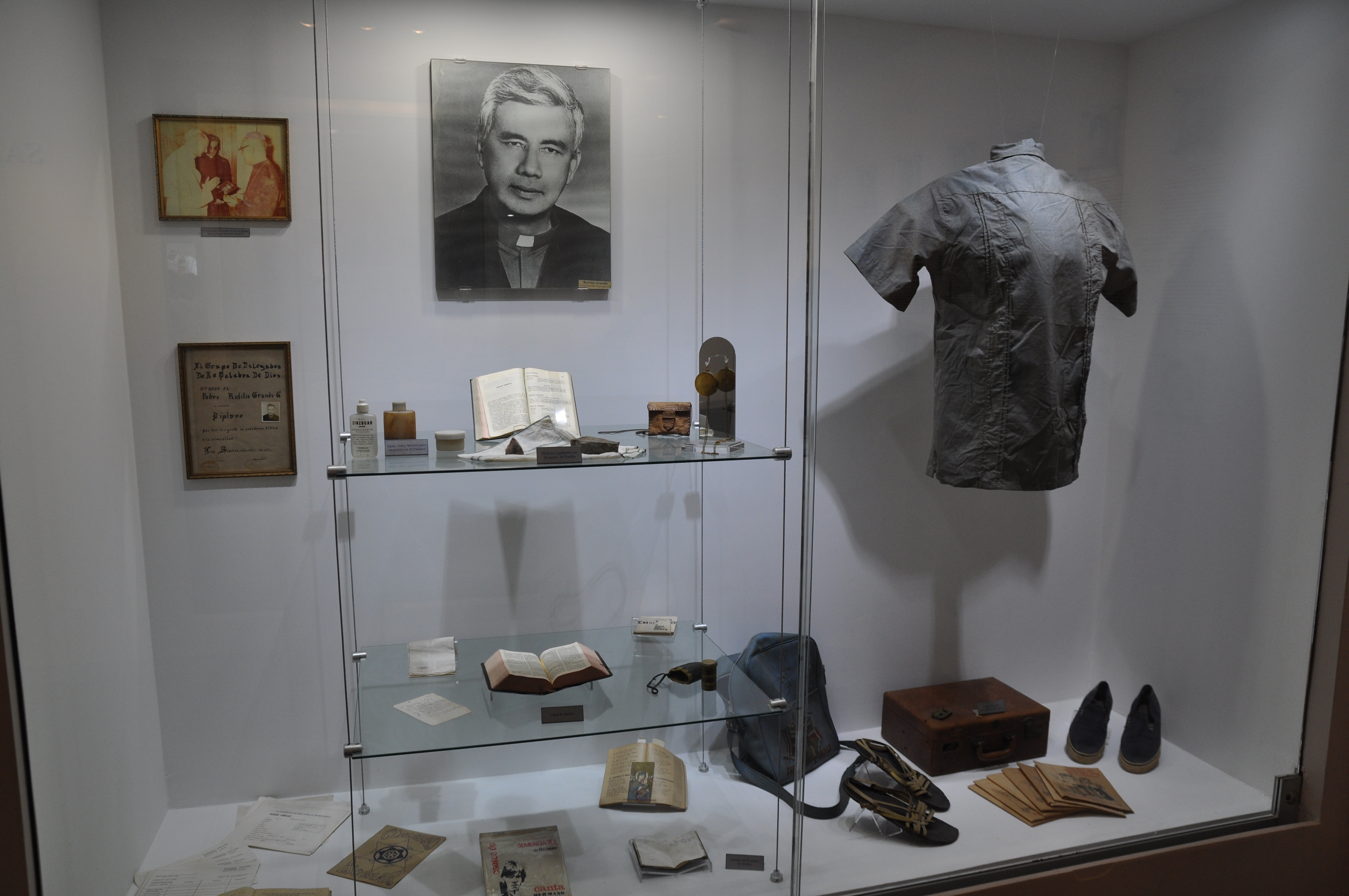
Museum exhibit about Rutilio Grande

In 1977, after the murder of Rutilio Grande, many wanted to pay tribute to his work and life, and all the country's artists were summoned to do so. Faced with silence and fear of reprisals towards artists, the Spanish painter and sculptor Pedro Gross made a monument to Grande. Days after its inauguration, the bust was blasted with dynamite, and the artist suffered threats and an attack that he escaped unscathed. He and his family fled the country.

The 1989 biography film Romero (1989) depicts Grande's friendship with Romero, his community work and activism, and his assassination. In the film, Grande's death becomes a major motivation in Romero's shift toward an activist role within the church and the nation. This view is supported in various biographies of Romero.

On 15 March 1991, a group of Salvadorans returning from Nicaragua after 11 years of being refugees founded Comunidad Rutilio Grande. Among the group's many projects is "Radio Rutilio," a radio station featuring local youth as broadcasters of community news and announcements. The community also participates in a partnership with a Lutheran congregation in the United States to provide secondary education to children in the Rutilio Grande community. In addition, the community has also maintained a sister city relationship with the town of Davis, California, since 1996.

As of 2005, Grande's nephew Orlando Erazo was the parish priest in El Paisnal.

The life and ministry of Grande is depicted in "Monsenor: The Last Journey of Oscar Romero", produced by the Kellogg Institute at the University of Notre Dame in 2011.
