= Catholic Church in North America =

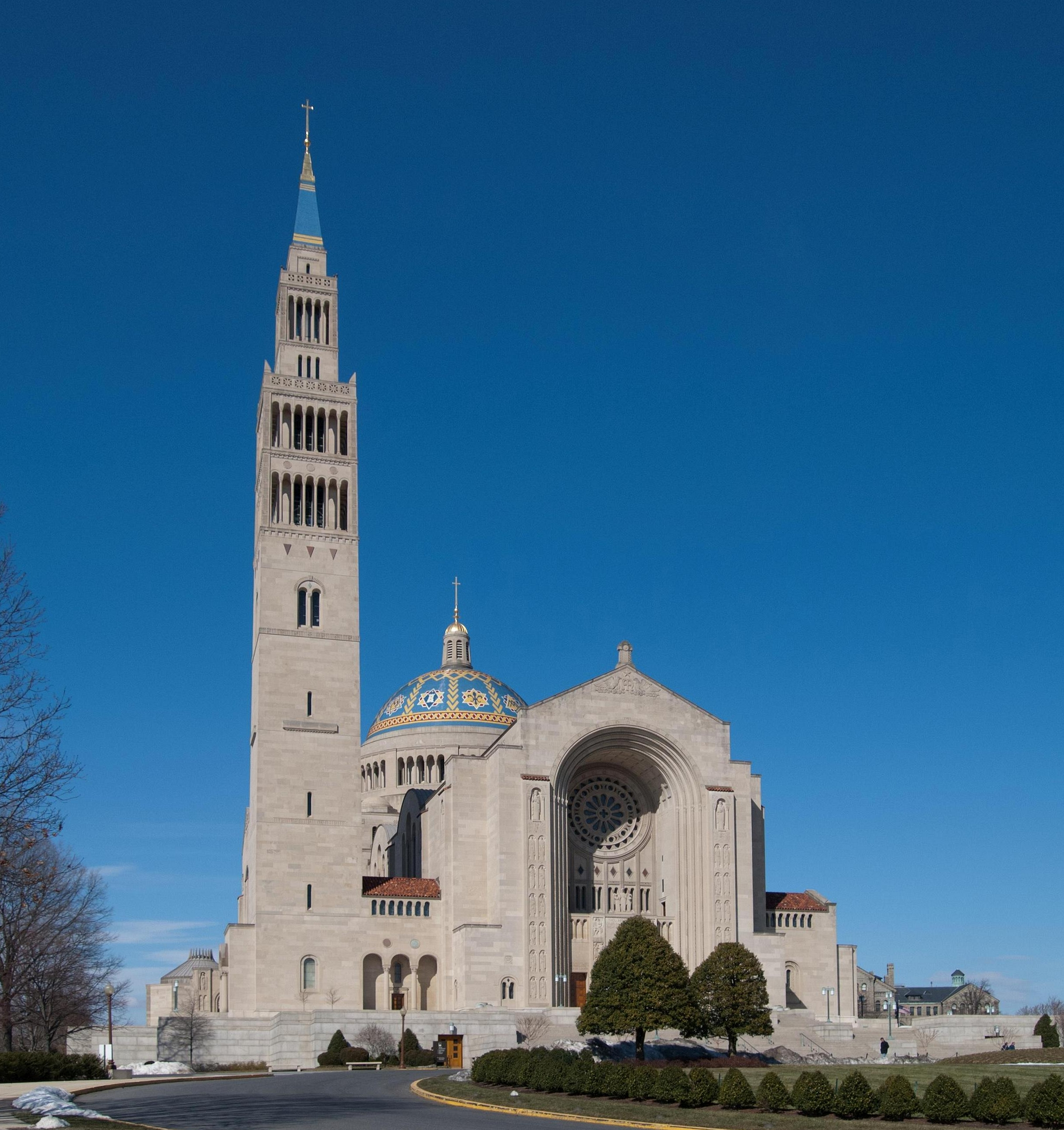
The Basilica of the National Shrine of the Immaculate Conception in Washington, D.C., is the largest Catholic church in the United States and one of the largest churches in the world.

The Catholic Church in North America refers to the Catholic Church in North America, in full communion with the Holy See in Rome, including its various geographical coverage on the continent. It is prevalent in many countries, on the mainland and in both island countries and overseas territories, such as the United States, the Dominican Republic, and El Salvador.

== Social and cultural issues ==
The Catholic Church has begun grouping “North” America with “Latin” and “Central” America as one America. Pope Paul VI was the first Pope to visit the Americas on October 4, 1965. He broke the tradition of treating the Americas separately but rather as one with common issues. These issues include extreme wage gaps, immigration, drug trafficking, human rights, consumerism, and secular thinking. The main issue at stake for the Catholic Church, found across the Americas including New York, São Paulo, and Mexico City, is the loss of Catholic faith. What was once a thriving Catholic region is now endangered by present-day culture and religions originating in the United States, including the Jehovah's Witness, Mormonism, and Protestant evangelical churches. These religions are influencing Mexico and are making their way to the Latin American countries.

== Papal visits to North America ==
On October 4, 1965, Pope Paul VI visited New York City for 13.5 hours, becoming the first Pontiff in the Western Hemisphere. During his visit he gave a 35-minute address on disarmament in the nuclear age, quoting the first Catholic President of the United States, John F. Kennedy. He visited President Lyndon Johnson for 46 minutes at the Waldorf Astoria hotel. He visited St. Patrick's Cathedral and a church near the United Nations. Starting in Queens, going through Harlem, and eventually down Fifth Avenue in Manhattan, he made a 25-mile procession greeting millions. He ended his visit with 90,000 worshipers celebrating Mass at Yankee Stadium. He finished his trip viewing Michelangelo's Pietà at the World's Fair in Queens. It is estimated he was seen in person by one million people and on television by 100 million.

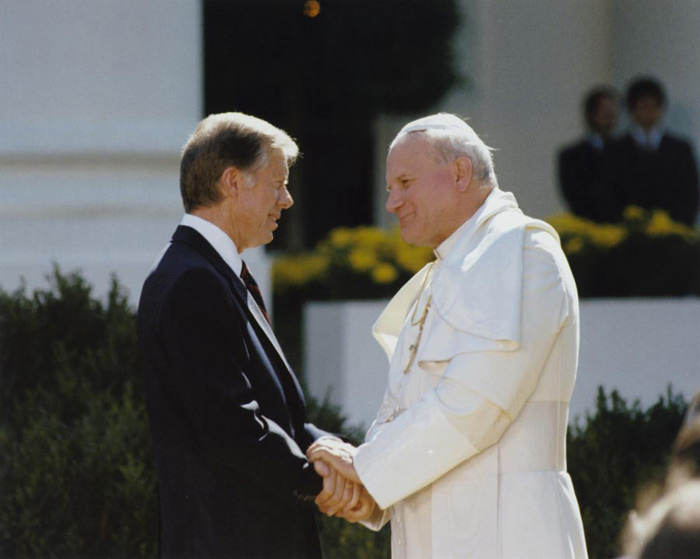
Pope John Paul II with U.S. President Jimmy Carter at the White House in 1979

In October 1979, Pope John Paul II visited the United States on his first of seven trips. He started in Boston and went to New York, where at the United Nations he advocated for human rights for all, especially Palestinian Arabs. He spent two days in New York, finishing with 80,000 congregants by celebrating mass at the Yankee Stadium reminding individuals of the "urgent need" to aid the poor. He then met with President Jimmy Carter, becoming the first Pope to enter the White House. He made an address on the South Lawn to 100,000 guests where he spoke on limiting nuclear weapons and against abortion.

In 1984, Pope John Paul II carried out the first papal visit to Canada; he visited again in 1987 and 2002.

Pope John Paul II, known as the first Pope to truly travel to different nations, took a pilgrimage to the Americas to focus on a "reconquest". During the Pope's visit to the Americas he wanted to focus on Mexico as the bridge between the different nations as the majority would soon no longer be Catholic. He made seven trips over two decades in an attempt to prevent Catholics from converting to other religions or to avert growing secularization. During the Pope's fourth trip to Mexico he delivered the conclusions on the November 1997 synod on "America".

Pope Benedict XVI visited President George W. Bush at the White House on April 16, 2008.

Pope Francis visited Cuba and the US in September 2015. He visited he visited Havana, Holguín, Santiago de Cuba, Washington, D.C., New York City, and Philadelphia.

Pope Francis visited Canada in 2022. This was a 'penitential pilgrimage' by the Pope to apologize for Catholic Church members' role in the Canadian residential school system.

== Present times ==
The Vatican holds North America as a crucial aspect to the Catholic Church as it is the world's superpower made up of mass international culture and a large population of Catholics. Mexico is the second-largest Catholic nation. In hopes of reversing the cultural influences of the United States in order to maintain the current level of Catholicity, the Church is sending what many call confusing signals. It is using modern mass marketing in an ad campaign that promotes the Pope's visits but condemns much of modern society. The mass communication efforts of the Church to North American through intense publicity reflects the hardships the church is going through with secular thinking and represents the efforts it is willing to make to spread the word of Christ in a modern form.

== See also ==
- Ecclesiastical property in the United States
- List of American saints and beatified people
- List of Canadian Roman Catholic saints
- List of Mexican Saints
- List of Central American and Caribbean Saints
