= Pedro Gross =

Spanish painter and sculptor (1904–1998)

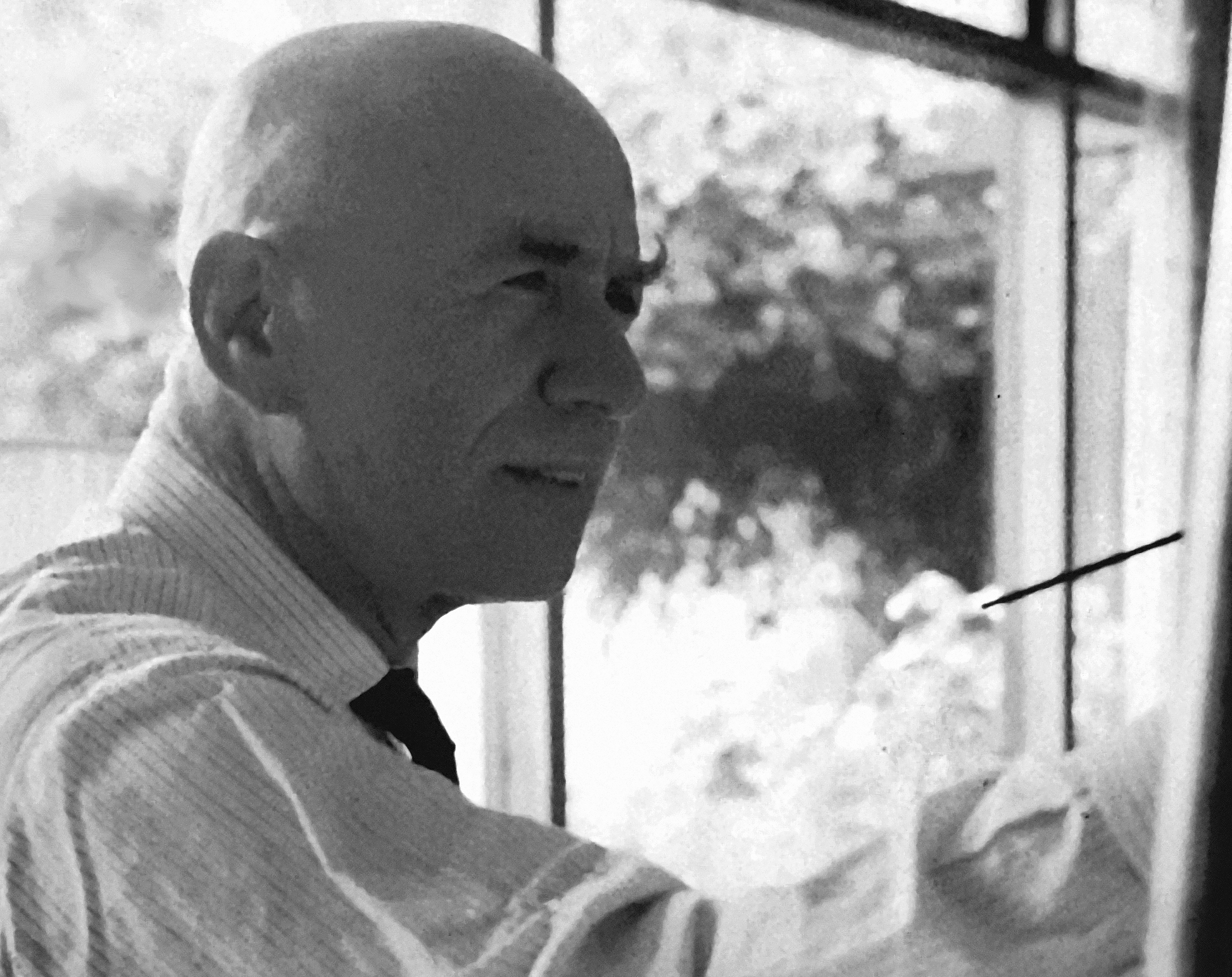
- Gross in 1957
- Born: Pedro Angulo Gross; 26 January 1904; Madrid, Spain
- Died: 31 January 1998 (aged 94); Medellín, Colombia
- Resting place: Medellín
- Education: Real Academia de Bellas Artes de San Fernando mainly self-taught autodidact
- Known for: painting, sculpture, actor, toymaker
- Notable work: The Inferno of the World; The three of poets; A New Man; La Maja del Capote; Los Monaguillos; Doña Blanca de los Rios; Sendas Obstinadas; The Anthill; Misery and Hope
- Movement: Impressionism, symbolism, contemporary
- Spouses: Josefina Agramunt (m. 1928–1957) Ana Suárez (m. 1968)
- Children: Jaime Angulo Agramunt; Delia Turina; Jaime Gross Suárez; Ana Helena Gross Suárez

Pedro Gros or Pedro Gross (January 26, 1904 – January 31, 1998) was a Spanish painter and sculptor of contemporary impressionist symbolism. He was also a jeweler, actor and businessman. He created the first doll brand in Spain (known as El Mago Gros in the 1930s, 1940s and 1950s) and worked as a professor of fine arts, toys and crafts in the Americas.

== First years ==
The work of Pedro Gross was greatly influenced by a difficult personal life that started in childhood. He did not know his father and lost his mother, Adela Gros (dressmaker and jeweler) to breast cancer when he was 10 years old. He found himself in the midst of deep poverty, with two younger siblings to care for.

In 1921, in the stead of his brother Antonio, he enlisted in the army to go to the front lines of the Rif War. In the Battle of the Rif in Tetouan, he witnessed the atrocities committed during the conflict. It was there that he first showed his artistic talent by making pencil portraits of the soldiers and commanders. He became the sketch artist of the Rif campaign.

On his return to Spain, he worked for the ABC newspaper and became close friends with Antonio Mingote, from the Luca de Tena family. In so doing he entered the circle of artists of the Café Varela.

He married Josefina Agramunt and they had their first child who died tragically in a domestic accident. This event marked him forever.

In 1930, he held his first exhibition of portraits in the Heraldo Salon in Madrid, with the sculptor Fernando Boada. The ease, strength and expressiveness of his portraits stood out. This was one of the early steps in his path to creating the first doll brand in Spain: Gros. The first dolls were characters from Salvador Bartolozzi and Mingote stories.

His second daughter Delia (Dalilah) was born with Josefina Agramunt, who was a famous child prodigy of Spanish dance, who converted to Arabic dance and was the most important artist of the genre in the 1960s and 1970s.

When the civil war broke out in Spain, the artist's studio and factory were burned down due to the refusal of the republican and nationalist sides to manufacture thousands of satirical and propaganda dolls for children.

== Awards in Spain ==
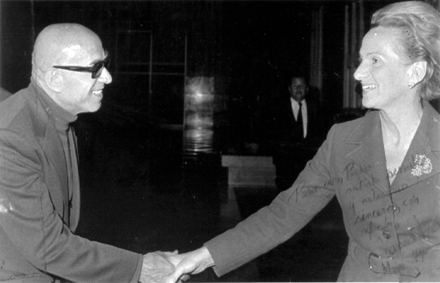
Karen Olsen Figueres, first lady of Costa Rica and Pedro Gross in an exhibition of The Inferno of the World in San Jose, in Central Bank of Costa Rica

In 1940s and 1950s in Spain, Pedro was one of the personalities of the artistic and bohemian life of Madrid. Winner of medals of honor from the Autumn salons in consecutive years from 1947 to 1950 with the works: La Maja del Capote, Doña Blanca de los Ríos, Los Monaguillos and Sendas Obstinada.

== Trilogy ==
Formed by three large-format canvases, the first, The Tree of Poets, 1957, (Currently located in the History Museum of Madrid) is a CinemaScope-format oil canvas. It is an allegory for love and reunion, despite the horrors, wounds and hatred sown in the Spanish Civil War. The allegory shows love as a creative, regenerating universal force, represents the hope of peace and equality and was the farewell to Spain, capturing 79 intellectuals, women and men of the time, among which are the poets of the gathering "Verses with skirts" of the Café Varela on Preciados street, to which he pays tribute.

With this first work, he conceives the idea of traveling through the Americas, making a pilgrimage with the second work and the centerpiece of the trilogy:

== Inferno of the World ==
1958 Beirut −1991 Medellín. Perhaps one of the largest space-time formats in the history of pictorial art, a colossal nomadic mural that for 33 years he was painting and exhibiting continuously, traveling through the United States, South America and Central America. It is a singular piece of contemporary symbolism that represents hatred as a human scourge, narrating its horrors and miseries in the history of humanity, cryptically creating a retrospective and prospective of its characters and world events, through a colossal octopus. which symbolizes the 8 deadly sins (According to Gross, the eighth sin is stupidity). In the painting he defends the need for change, in the face of the evils that will increasingly haunt the planet: devastation and climate change, helpless and exploited children, intolerance, political corruption, nationalisms, populisms, automation...

The trilogy closes with the play: A New Man, 1990. It is an allegory of the encounter in greed, performed at the Yalta Conference after defeating the aberrant Nazi regime. On the canvas they represent the elements that gave birth to the so-called new order and the Cold War between the new powers after the conflict.

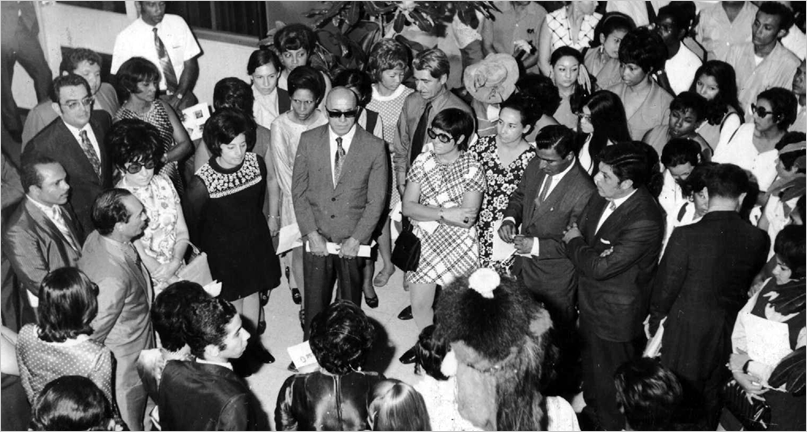
Inauguration of the exhibition of The Inferno of the World at the Legislative Palace of Panama, with Berta torrijos and the president Omar Torrijos in 1972

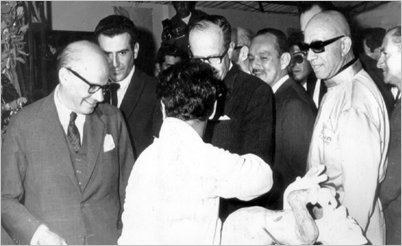
President of Colombia Carlos Lleras Restrepo, Pedro Gross and commissioners of culture in the art exhibition in the Bank of the republic of Colombia

== Ambassador of art and universal values in the Americas ==
A stage of itinerant activity in Colombia, Panama, Costa Rica, El Salvador and the United States, with exhibitions of his work and The Inferno of the World in the main museums and salons of Latin America, an activity that alternated with teaching work in fine arts and crafts for homeless or disabled children and youth.

He married Ana Suárez in Colombia in 1968 and had two children Jaime Gross in Bogotá, Colombia and Ana Helena Gross in San José, Costa Rica.

During the journey through the Americas from 1957 to 1998, his work elicited intense reactions against and in favor, such as friendship with the great Costa Rican statesman Pepe Figueres and the first Lady Karen Olsen, also with the presidents of Colombia Alberto Lleras Camargo and Carlos Lleras Restrepo. In Panama in 1972, President Omar Torrijos bid for the purchase of The Inferno of the World mural and the artist's refusal forced him to leave the country.

The attempts on his life in San Salvador 1977 were also highlighted, for making the posthumous monument to the priest Rutilio Grande, assassinated by the death squads. Affectionately called "Father Tilo", he was a promoter of the fight against hatred and violence, he was the founder of reflection gatherings with the so-called "delegates of the word" with priests and peasants in the middle of the Salvadoran Civil War.

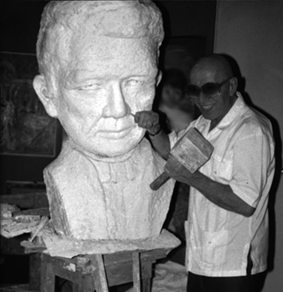
Sculpture blown up a few days after its inauguration by the death squads. The artist was threatened with death and abandoned El Salvador

Back in Colombia in the eighties he also suffered threats for including in The Inferno of the World the Crimes of Tacueyó by the FARC, for the interview on the television program Correo Cultural, in which he was interviewed by Gloria Valencia de Castaño and the program Atando Cabos (Tying up the dots) of the captain and presenter Adolfo Vale Berrío in which, live and direct, he incorporated the last character and the last brushstrokes of The Inferno of the World.

In the last years of artistic activity in the United States, at the age of 92, large exhibitions were scheduled at the World Trade Center in Miami, but strong episodes of reactive depression caused the event to be canceled.

Back in Colombia for treatment and confinement, he died a natural death at the age of 94 in Medellín in 1998.
