= Santissimo Sacramento a Tor de' Schiavi =

- Church of the Most Holy Sacrament in Tor de' Schiavi
- Chiesa del Santissimo Sacramento a Tor de' Schiavi
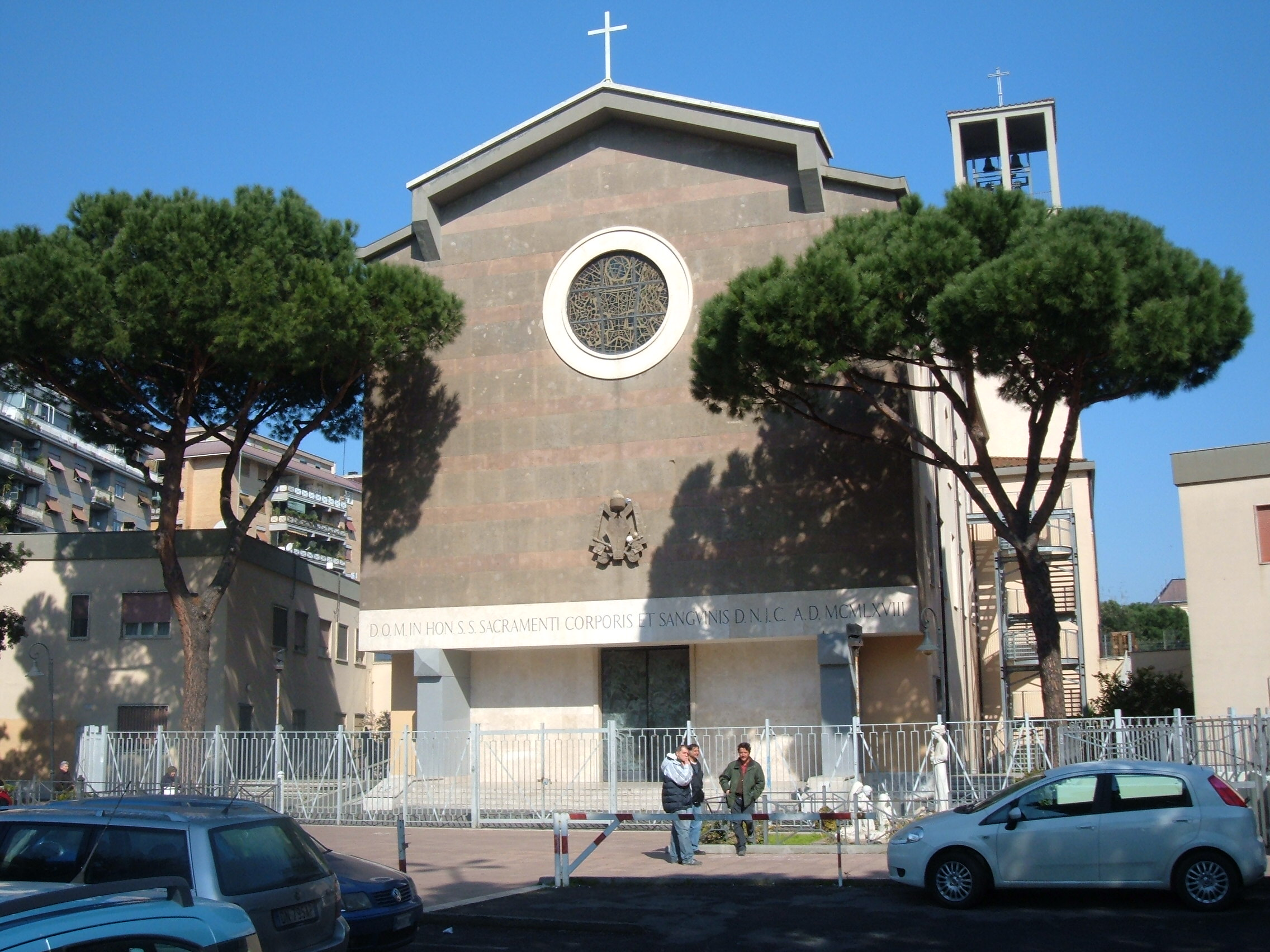
- Click on the map for a fullscreen view
- 41°53′32″N 12°33′28″E
- Location: Largo Agosta 10, Prenestino-Labicano, Rome
- Country: Italy
- Language: Italian
- Denomination: Catholic
- Tradition: Roman Rite
- Website: sssacramento.it

History
- Status: titular church
- Dedication: Blessed Sacrament
- Consecrated: 5 May 1968

Architecture
- Architect: Francesco Fornari
- Architectural type: Modern, Romanesque Revival
- Groundbreaking: 1966
- Completed: 1968

Administration
- Diocese: Rome

Santissimo Sacramento a Tor de' Schiavi is a 20th-century parochial church and titular church in eastern Rome, dedicated to the Blessed Sacrament.

== History ==
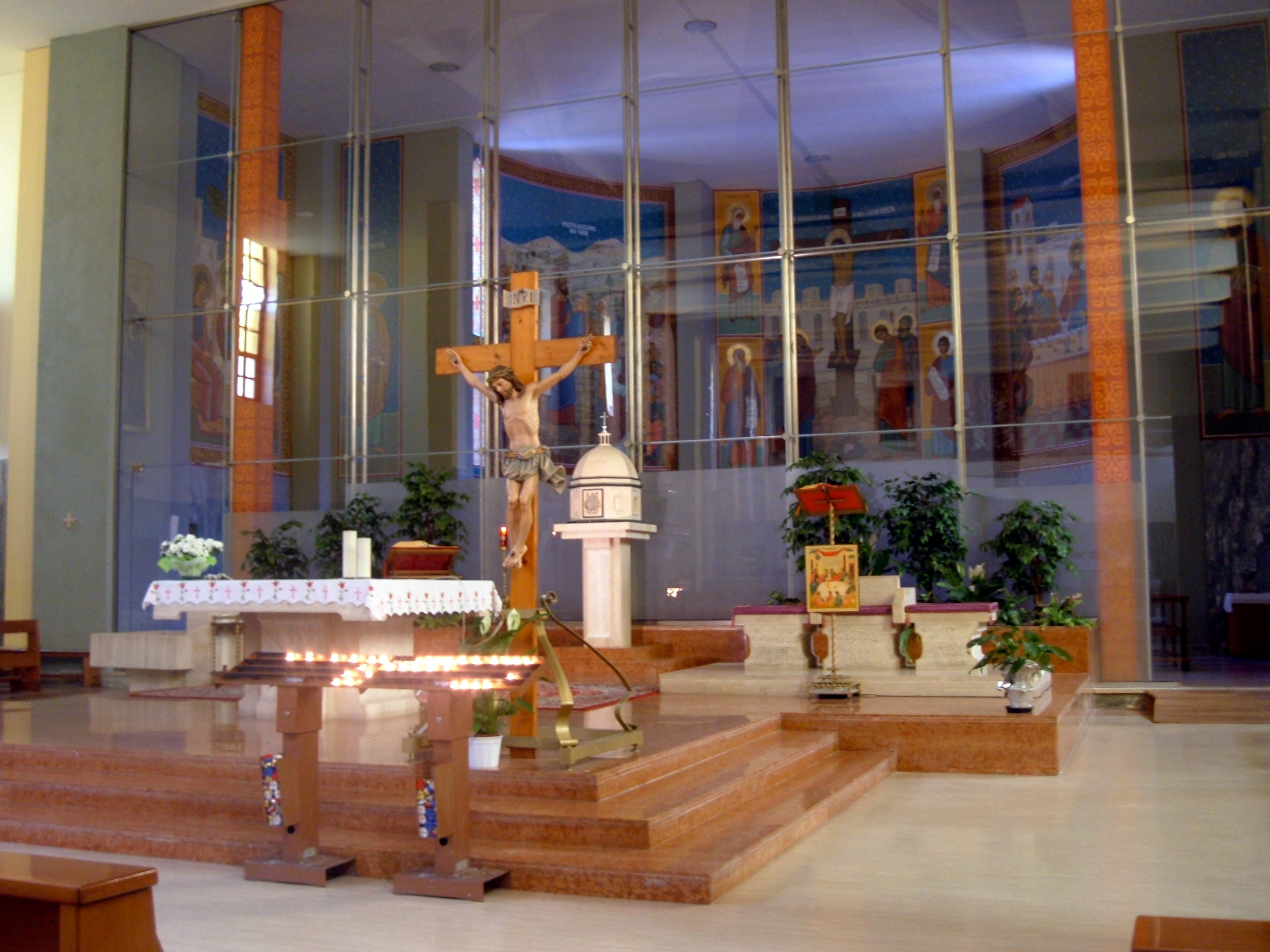
View of altar

The church was built in 1966–68. It has received three papal visits: Paul VI in 1972, John Paul II in 1993 and Francis in 2018.

On 28 June 2017, it was made a titular church to be held by a cardinal-priest.

Cardinal-protectors

- Gregorio Rosa Chávez (2017–present)
