= Aguilares, El Salvador =

Salvadoran City

Aguilares
- District
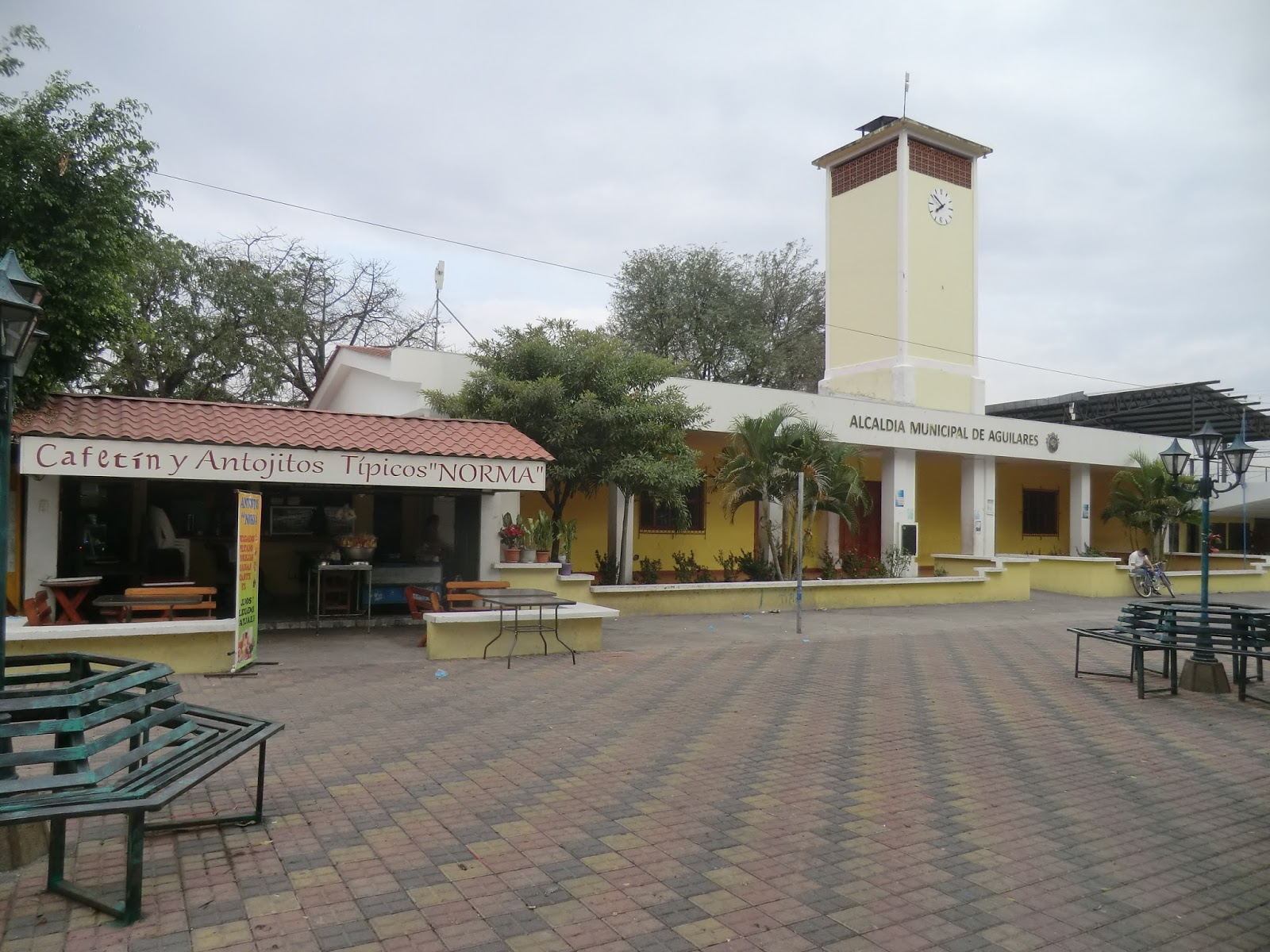

- Flag Seal

- Location in El Salvador
- Coordinates: 13°57′N 89°11′W
- Country: El Salvador
- Department: San Salvador Department

Area
  - Total: 12.63 sq mi (32.72 km^{2})
- Elevation: 981 ft (299 m)

Population (2006)
  - Total: 73,300
- Time zone: UTC-6

Aguilares is a district in the San Salvador department of El Salvador, located 33 km away from the city of San Salvador. The municipality measures 33.72 km² and as of 2006, had an estimated population of 73,300. Sugar cane cultivation is the major economic activity for the area.

The municipality is divided into five administrative divisions, called cantones: Florida, Las Tunas, Pinalitos, Pishishapa, and Los Mangos. It is bounded on the north by El Paisnal, on the east by Suchitoto (Cuscatlán Department) and Guazapa, to the south by Nejapa and Guazapa, and to the west by Quezaltepeque (La Libertad Department) and El Paisnal.

== Toponymy ==
The municipality was named in honor of Nicolás, Vicente, and Manuel Aguilar, leaders in the Salvadoran independence movement.

== History ==
In the 1970s, the associated Catholic parish of Aguilares was served by Rutilio Grande, a Jesuit priest and activist who was assassinated on the outskirts of town. In 1979 or 1980, during the Salvadoran Civil War, the Salvadoran Army pillaged the town until its people retook it, depicted in Archbishop of San Salvador Óscar Romero's homily as images of the crucified Christ.
