= Ecclesiastical property in the United States =

The ownership of ecclesiastical property in the United States was often an issue of controversy in the early years of the United States, particularly in regard to the Catholic Church.

In the United States the employment of lay trustees was customary in some parts of the country from a very early period. Dissensions sometimes arose with the ecclesiastical authorities, and the Holy See intervened to restore peace. Pope Pius VII vindicated the rights of the Church as against the pretensions of the trustees, and Pope Gregory XVI declared: "We wish all to know that the office of trustees is entirely dependent upon the authority of the bishop, and that consequently the trustees can undertake nothing except with the approval of the ordinary."

The Third Plenary Council of Baltimore laid down certain regulations concerning trustees: It belongs to the bishop to judge of the necessity of constituting them, their number and manner of appointment; their names are to be proposed to the bishop by the parish rector; the appointment is to be made in writing and is revocable at the will of the bishop; the trustees selected should be men who have made their Easter duty, who contribute to the support of the Church, who send their children to Catholic schools, and who are not members of prohibited societies; nothing can be done at a board meeting except by the consent of the rector who presides; in case of disagreement between the trustees and the rector, the judgment of the bishop must be accepted. A decree of the Congregation of the Council declares that the vesting of the title to church property in a board of trustees is a preferable legal form, and that in constituting such boards in the United States, the best method is that in use in New York, by which the Ordinary, his vicar-general, the parish priest, and two laymen approved by the bishop form the corporation.
