= Cosma Spessotto =

Italian Roman Catholic priest and Franciscan friar (1923-1980)

Blessed Cosma Spessotto OFM
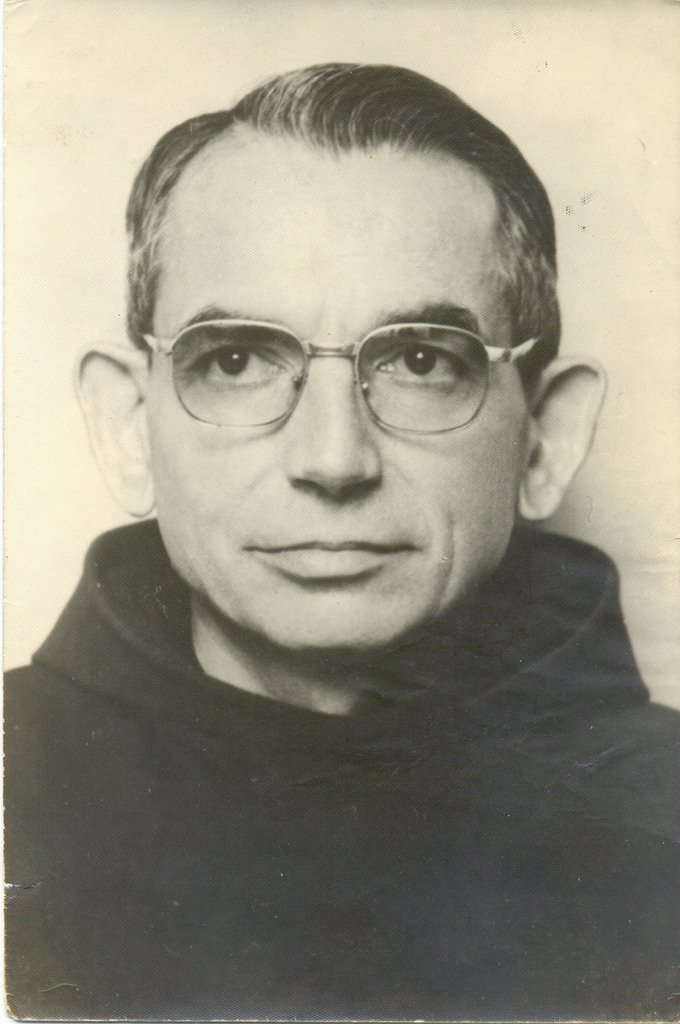
- 1978 photograph.

Martyr
- Born: Sante Spessotto; 28 January 1923; Mansuè, Italy
- Died: 14 June 1980 (aged 57); San Juan Nonualco, El Salvador
- Resting place: Church of San Juan Bautista, San Juan Nonualco, La Paz, El Salvador
- Venerated in: Roman Catholic Church (Order of Friars Minor & El Salvador)
- Beatified: 22 January 2022, Plaza Divino Salvador del Mundo, San Salvador, El Salvador by Cardinal Gregorio Rosa Chávez
- Feast: 14 June
- Attributes: Franciscan habit

Cosma Spessotto, OFM (Spanish: Cosme Spessotto Zamuner) (28 January 1923 – 14 June 1980) was an Italian Catholic priest of the Order of Friars Minor. He was sent to serve in the foreign missions in El Salvador in 1950, where he aided the faithful through evangelization and the construction of churches.

Spessotto – like the then-Archbishop of San Salvador Óscar Romero – spoke out against injustices on the part of the junta of El Salvador which caused him to receive a number of death threats. He was killed in 1980 in the church where he served as pastor, just prior to the celebration of Mass, shot at point blank range.

His cause for canonization was approved in 1999 under Pope John Paul II when he became titled as a Servant of God. On 26 May 2020, it was announced by the Holy See that Pope Francis had approved his beatification, with the date of the ceremony to be determined once the COVID-19 pandemic had passed while it was later announced on 27 August 2021 that the beatification rite would be celebrated on 22 January 2022. He would be beautified in San Salvador on January 22, 2022.

== Life ==
=== Early life ===
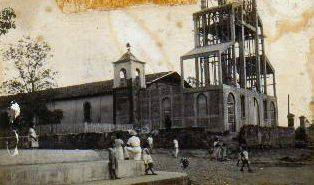
Construction of the parish church in 1960.

He was born Sante Spessotto on 28 January 1923 in Mansuè, Treviso, to a peasant couple, Vittorio Spessotto and Josefina Zamuner. He received his baptism on the following 30 January.

As a young woman, Spessotto's paternal aunt Maria had been in the process of becoming a nun but was forced to withdraw from the novitiate due to a bone disease. She later helped to care for her nephews and taught them catechism while aiding them with housework; she also told them stories of saints. Spessotto received his confirmation in 1932 while in 1933 he felt a firm call to the priesthood and so insisted to his father that he start his education in preparation for that.

Spessotto travelled to the friary of the Friars Minor in Motta di Livenza and asked a friar how much it would take for him to enter, to which the friar responded that the candidate would need to have a clear vocation and the will to serve God. He then demanded that his father relent to his request, to which he did and Sante left for Lonigo to begin his formation as a friar on 3 September 1938. He took the clothes and savings that his aunt had packed for him. While waiting for his train at the station, he said to his father: "Now I call you father but one day you'll call me father".

On 16 September 1939 Spessotto was admitted into the novitiate of the Province of Veneto and received the Franciscan habit as well as his religious name of "Cosma". This took place in Vicenza, in a secluded friary on a hilltop, where those at that friary tried to live according to the Rule of Life of Saint Francis of Assisi and the motto of Saint Leonard of Port Maurice. He made his temporary profession of religious vows on 17 September 1940. He was then sent to study philosophy in the friary of San Antonio de Genoa in Udine, but World War II prompted the transfer of the friary's students to the friary of San Francesco in Padua.

Spessoto's final months of philosophical studies were located in an area where aerial bombings during the conflict became a high risk – at the friary of San Pancrazio in Barbarano Vicentino – which was leveled by bombings by Allied Forces in December 1944 and again the following March, thus the students were forced to take refuge elsewhere. His theological studies were conducted at San Vito al Tagliamento, where he underwent an operation for an ulcer. The war made anesthesia impossible, so he was forced to endure the pain – he asked a nursing religious sister for a crucifix and that she squeeze his hand during the operation, which proved successful.

Spessotto made his profession of solemn vows on 19 March 1944 and was ordained to the priesthood on 27 June 1948. After his ordination, he requested to be sent to the missions in China, but his mother forbade it due to the volatile tensions with the Communists who had assumed power in 1949. He also wanted to go to Africa, but this too never materialized.

The following year, three friars – including Spessotto – were assigned to go as missionaries to El Salvador. They set sail from the port of Genoa on 9 March 1950 and arrived on 4 April 1950.

=== El Salvador ===
Spessotto did not speak any Spanish when he arrived in El Salvador and so had to learn the language in order to speak and connect with the locals. After three years, he was assigned to serve as the pastor of the Church of St. John the Baptist in the town of San Juan Nonualco. His entrance into his first parish on 8 October 1953 was recalled as the priest being on a Vespa and being covered in dust due to the unpaved roads. He spent his first week visiting home after home in order to meet the locals. Spessotto aimed to connect to the local communities while in El Salvador and worked to rebuild a church that an earthquake had leveled in the 1930s. He learned on one occasion that there were hundreds of couples living together but were not married and in response he organized mass weddings where he married several couples at once. On another occasion guerillas took control of a church and took several priests hostage which ended when Spessotto negotiated their release. He also raised funds for the construction of a school and health clinics.

Spessotto also helped in the construction of a modern and functional church and construction for that church commenced on 2 June 1960. He introduced the cultivation of wine grapes into the region.

By the late 1970s, Spessotto had begun to denounce the abuses on the part of the junta then ruling that nation. He grew all more vocal in his denunciations after armed gunmen had assassinated the Jesuit priest Rutilio Grande. Yet this was not without complications for he had received his own death threats due to his strong denunciations and opposition to the El Salvadorian military forces. He nonetheless continued to care to the needs of the ill of his parish while aiding the poor of the area.

In May 1980 he was admitted to hospital due to liver complications but was instead diagnosed with leukemia.

On 14 June 1980 Spessotto had celebrated Mass that afternoon for a slain student in his parish church of St. John the Baptist in San Juan Nonualco, where he had served as pastor for many years. He was shot at point-blank range around 7:00pm. He was murdered at the altar while preparing to preside at the celebration of an evening Mass. As he lay dying, he forgave his murderers. His final words – according to the priest Filiberto del Bosco – were "pardon ... pardon" as del Bosco gave him the anointing of the sick.

== Beatification ==
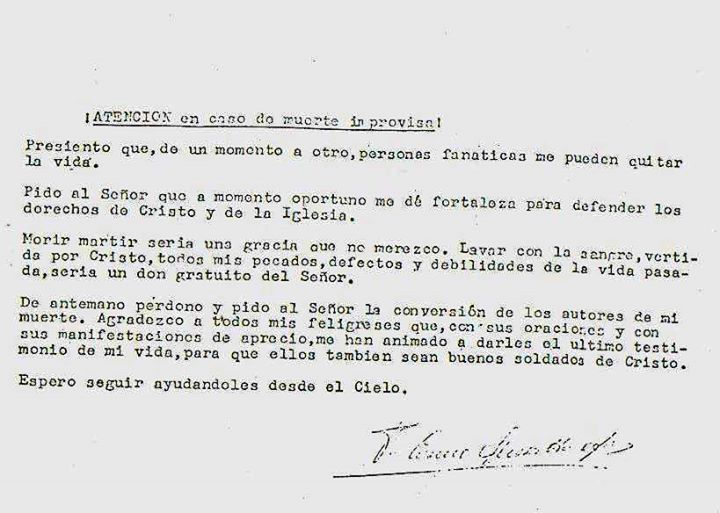
Text of his last will.

The process for the canonization of Spessottol was opened by the Roman Catholic Diocese of Zacatecoluca on 17 July 1999. The diocesan process opened on 14 June 2000 and closed on 14 June 2001, the anniversary of Spessotto's death.

The cause was officially accepted by the Holy See on 4 April 2003, in which the Congregation for the Causes of Saints approved the process for further investigation, whereupon Spessotto was titled a Servant of God. On 26 May 2020, it was announced by the Holy See that Pope Francis had approved his beatification. The beatification was celebrated on 22 January 2022 with Cardinal Gregorio Rosa Chávez presiding over the rite on the Pope's behalf and delivering a homily. The postulator that is assigned to the cause is Giovangiuseppe Califano. Among those beautified with Spessotto were Father Rutilio Grande and his two lay companions Nelson Rutilio Lemus and Manuel Solórzano.
