= Marcello Maruzzo =

Italian missionary

Blessed Marcello Maruzzo OFM
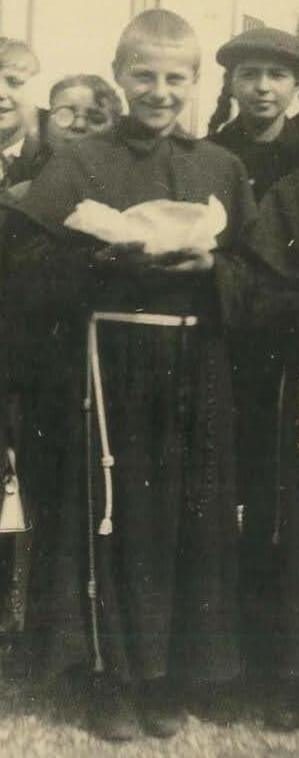
- Church: Roman Catholic Church

Orders
- Ordination: 21 June 1953 by Angelo Giuseppe Roncalli
- Rank: Priest

Personal details
- Born: Marcello Rappo Maruzzo; 23 July 1929 Lapio di Arcugnano, Vicenza, Kingdom of Italy
- Died: 1 July 1981 (aged 51) Quiriguá, Los Amates, Izabal, Guatemala
- Denomination: Roman Catholic
- Parents: Angelo Maruzzo (father); Augusta Rappo (mother)

Sainthood
- Feast day: 1 July
- Venerated in: Roman Catholic Church
- Beatified: 27 October 2018; Morales, Izabal, Guatemala by Cardinal Giovanni Angelo Becciu
- Attributes: Franciscan habit

Marcello "Tullio" Rappo Maruzzo OFM (23 July 1929 – 1 July 1981) was an Italian Catholic priest and missionary dedicated to catechesis and evangelization among the local people in Guatemala. Maruzzo was a member of the Order of Friars Minor.

Murdered in 1981 alongside Luis Navarro, Maruzzo is venerated by Catholics and his beatification received approval from Pope Francis and was celebrated in Izabal, Guatemala on 27 October 2018.

== Life ==
Marcello Maruzzo was born near Vicenza, Italy in 1929 to the poor peasants Angelo Maruzzo and Augusta Rappo, one of eight children. His twin sibling was Daniele (later Fra Lucio). His mother died on 21 September 1940.

Maruzzo and his twin brother Daniele joined the Order of Friars Minor in 1940 (first doing their novitiate) and both received their ordination to the priesthood from Cardinal Angelo Giuseppe Roncalli—the future Pope John XXIII—on 21 June 1953. Maruzzo studied for the priesthood in Chiampo before his first vesting in the habit in 1945 and his profession in 1951. His brother left Italy to be a missionary in Central America in December 1956. Maruzzo followed his brother leaving Italy for Guatemala in 1960. He first settled in Puerto Barrios on 16 December 1960, learning Spanish so he could communicate with the local communities. He tended to their needs and celebrated Mass for them but also moved from village to village where he worked with the local Caritas distributing necessities to the poor while defending the rights of the peasants. He evangelized the message of the Gospel to them and was known for being a friend to the poor and the homeless.

Maruzzo received warnings, threats, and intimidation aimed at stopping his work. He was accused of being a "communist priest". His superiors feared that the intimidation would escalate, so they transferred Maruzzo elsewhere, but the threats continued. It was during his final placement that he met and worked alongside Luis Navarro, who was a catechist.

He and Navarro were at a catechetical meeting when the pair were ambushed and shot dead at 10:40 pm on 1 July 1981.

== Beatification ==
His beatification process commenced under Pope Benedict XVI, on 10 November 2005, together with that of Luis Navarro. Subsequently, the Congregation for the Causes of Saints (C.C.S.) declared the "nihil obstat" (no objections to the cause) and the two men were given the title Servants of God. The investigation was conducted by the Izabal apostolic vicars under Gabriel Peñate Rodríguez bishop from its inauguration on 31 January 2006 until its closure later on 15 July 2008. Their documents of investigation went to the C.C.S. in Rome who validated the diocesan phase of investigation in a decree issued on 12 February 2010. The C.C.S. received the Positio dossier from the postulation later in 2014.

The theologians advising the congregation issued their approval to the argument that the two were killed in hatred of the faith in their meeting held on 31 May 2016, while the members of the C.C.S. also confirmed this on 26 September 2017. Pope Francis confirmed their beatification in a decree promulgated on 9 October 2017 in an audience with the congregation's prefect.

The beatification was held in Izabal, Guatemala on 27 October 2018.

The current postulator for this cause is the Franciscan priest Giovangiuseppe Califano.
