= Luis Navarro (missionary) =

Guatemalan missionary and martyr

Blessed Luis Navarro TOFS

Martyr
- Born: Luis Obdulio Arroyo Navarro; 21 June 1950; Quiriguá, Los Amates, Izabal, Guatemala
- Died: 1 July 1981 (aged 31); Quiriguá, Los Amates, Izabal, Guatemala
- Venerated in: Roman Catholic Church
- Beatified: 27 October 2018, Morales, Izabal, Guatemala by Cardinal Giovanni Angelo Becciu
- Feast: 1 July

Luis Navarro, TOFS (21 June 1950 – 1 July 1981) was a Guatemalan Catholic missionary dedicated to catechesis and evangelization among the local people in Guatemala. He was member of the Secular Franciscan Order.

Murdered in 1981, Navarro is venerated by Catholics and his beatification, approved by Pope Francis, was celebrated in Izabal, Guatemala, on 27 October 2018.

== Life ==
Luis Obdulio Arroyo Navarro was born on 21 June 1950, and served as a catechist in Guatemala, his birthplace. After meeting Italian missionary Marcello Maruzzo, the two collaborated in evangelizing and catechizing to the poor and peasants in the Izabal Department. He became a member of the Secular Franciscan Order and remained unmarried throughout his life.

He and Maruzzo were attending a catechetical meeting one evening when the pair was ambushed and shot dead. Navarro knew of the threats directed against Maruzzo, but worked with him despite knowing that he, too, could be targeted.

== Beatification ==
His beatification process commenced under Pope Benedict XVI, on 10 November 2005, together with that of Marcello Maruzzo. Subsequently, the Congregation for the Causes of Saints (C.C.S.) declared the "nihil obstat" (no objections to the cause) and the two men were given the title Servants of God. The investigation was conducted by the Izabal apostolic vicars under Gabriel Peñate Rodríguez bishop from its inauguration on 31 January 2006 until its closure later on 15 July 2008. Their documents of investigation went to the C.C.S. in Rome who validated the diocesan phase of investigation in a decree issued on 12 February 2010. The C.C.S. received the Positio dossier from the postulation later in 2014.

The theologians advising the congregation issued their approval to the argument that the two were killed in hatred of the faith in their meeting held on 31 May 2016, while the members of the C.C.S. also confirmed this on 26 September 2017. Pope Francis confirmed their beatification in a decree promulgated on 9 October 2017 in an audience with the congregation's prefect.

The beatification was held in Izabal, Guatemala on 27 October 2018.

The current postulator for this cause is the Franciscan priest Giovangiuseppe Califano.
