= El Paisnal =

- District
- Location in El Salvador
- Coordinates: 13°58′N 89°13′W
- Country: El Salvador
- Department: San Salvador Department

Government
  - Type: Nuevas Ideas
- Elevation: 1,050 ft (320 m)

El Paisnal is a district in the San Salvador department of El Salvador. The population in 2024 was 15,469.
