= Gregorio Rosa Chávez =

Salvadoran Roman Catholic prelate (born 1942)

His Eminence Gregorio Rosa Chávez
- Cardinal; Auxiliary Bishop emeritus of San Salvador
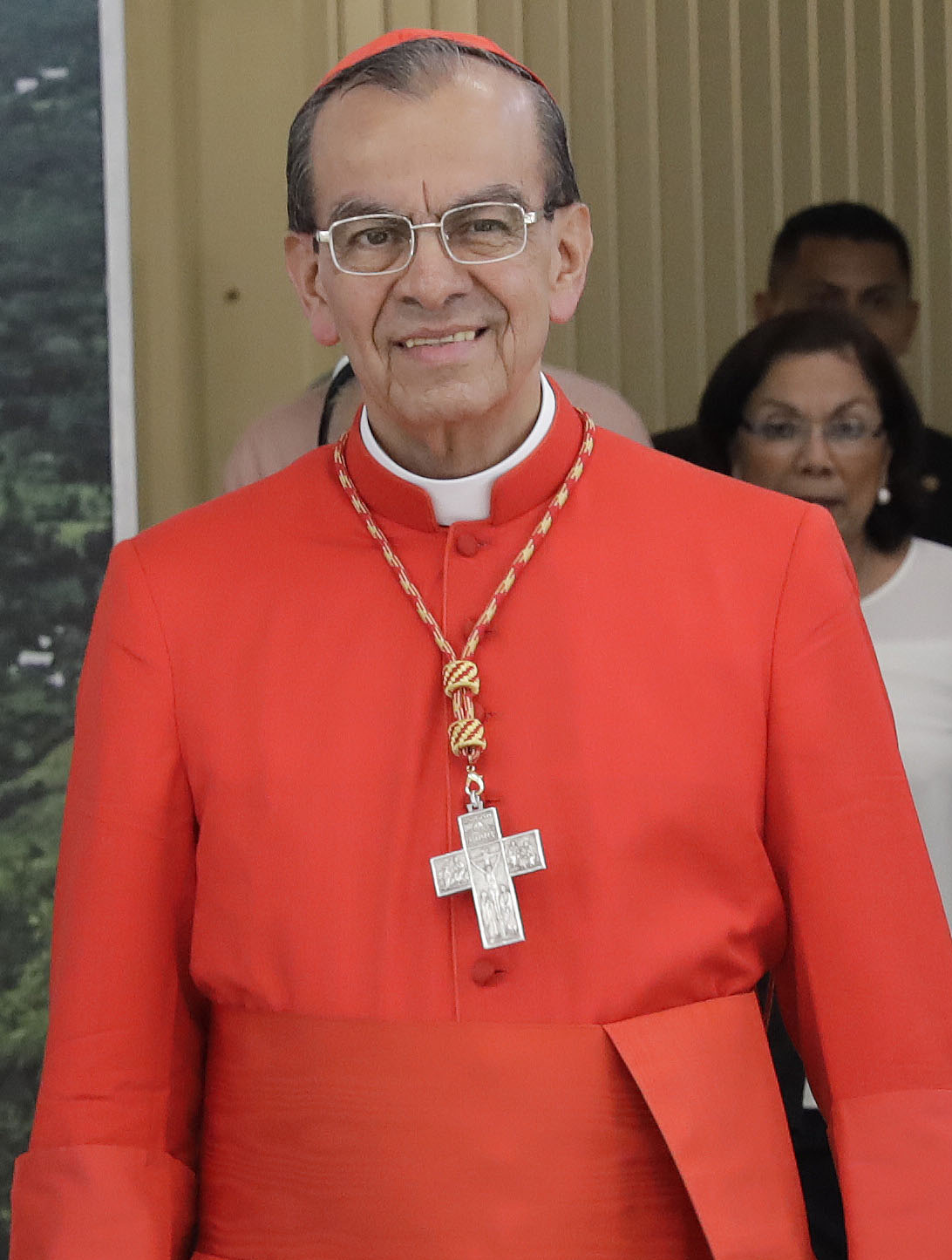
- Rosa Chávez in mid-2017
- Church: Catholic Church
- Appointed: 17 February 1982
- Term ended: 4 October 2022
- Predecessor: Marco René Revelo Contreras
- Other post: Cardinal-Priest of Santissimo Sacramento a Tor de' Schiavi (2017–present)
- Previous posts: Secretary-General of the Episcopal Secretariat of Central America and Panama (1984–88; 2001–05); Titular Bishop of Mulli (1982–2017)

Orders
- Ordination: 24 January 1970 by José Eduardo Alvarez Ramírez
- Consecration: 3 July 1982 by Lajos Kada
- Created cardinal: 28 June 2017 by Pope Francis
- Rank: Cardinal-Priest

Personal details
- Born: Gregorio Rosa Chávez; 3 September 1942 (age 84) Sociedad, Morazán, El Salvador
- Education: University of Louvain
- Motto: Christus pax nostra (Christ is our peace)
- Coat of arms: Gregorio Rosa Chávez's coat of arms

Styles of Gregorio Rosa Chávez
- Reference style: His Eminence
- Spoken style: Your Eminence
- Informal style: Cardinal

Ordination history of Gregorio Rosa Chávez
History
Priestly ordination
- Ordained by: José Eduardo Alvarez Ramírez, C.M.
- Date: 24 January 1970
- Place: San Miguel Cathedral, San Miguel, El Salvador
Episcopal consecration
- Principal consecrator: Lajos Kada
- Co-consecrators: José Eduardo Alvarez Ramírez, C.M. & Arturo Rivera Damas, S.D.B.
- Date: 3 July 1982
- Place: Church of María Auxiliadora, San Salvador, El Salvador
Cardinalate
- Elevated by: Pope Francis
- Date: 28 June 2017

Gregorio Rosa Chávez (Spanish pronunciation: [ɡɾeˈɣo.ɾjo ˈrosa ˈtʃaβes]; born 3 September 1942) is a Salvadoran Catholic prelate who served as Auxiliary Bishop of San Salvador from 1982 to 2022. He was a close collaborator of St. Óscar Romero.

Pope Francis made Rosa a cardinal on 28 June 2017, the first cardinal from El Salvador and a rare instance for any auxiliary bishop; the ordinary of a diocese typically is afforded that distinction when it is granted. As such, in archdiocesan affairs the Archbishop of San Salvador had precedence but Rosa ranked higher in the larger Church structure.

== Life ==
Gregorio Rosa Chávez was born on 3 September 1942 in Sociedad to farmers. His initial education was spent in Sociedad and later at Jocoro. He underwent both his theological and philosophical studies in San Salvador at San José de la Montaña (1957–61) before he studied communications (obtaining a licentiate) in Louvain at the college from 1973 to 1976. He continued his studies from 1966 to 1969 before serving as an episcopal aide for the diocese of San Miguel from 1970 to 1973. His education in communications began his lifelong interest in media communications as a tool of evangelization. He was ordained a priest at the San Miguel cathedral on 24 January 1970 and he was pastor of the El Rosario church in San Miguel from 1970 to 1973 while serving as the diocesan director of social communications from 1971 to 1973. Rosa served as the spiritual assessor for some religious movements from 1970 to 1973 and was rector of San José de la Montaña from 1977 to 1982. Under his close friend Óscar Romero from 1977 he headed the archdiocesan communication's office until 1982. From 1977 until 1982 he served as a theological professor and from 1979 to 1982 served as a member of the Board of Directors of the Organization of Latin American Seminaries.

On 17 February 1982, Pope John Paul II appointed him titular bishop of Mulli and auxiliary bishop of San Salvador. He received his episcopal consecration at the church of María Auxiliadora in San Salvador on 3 July from Archbishop Lajos Kada, apostolic nuncio to El Salvador.

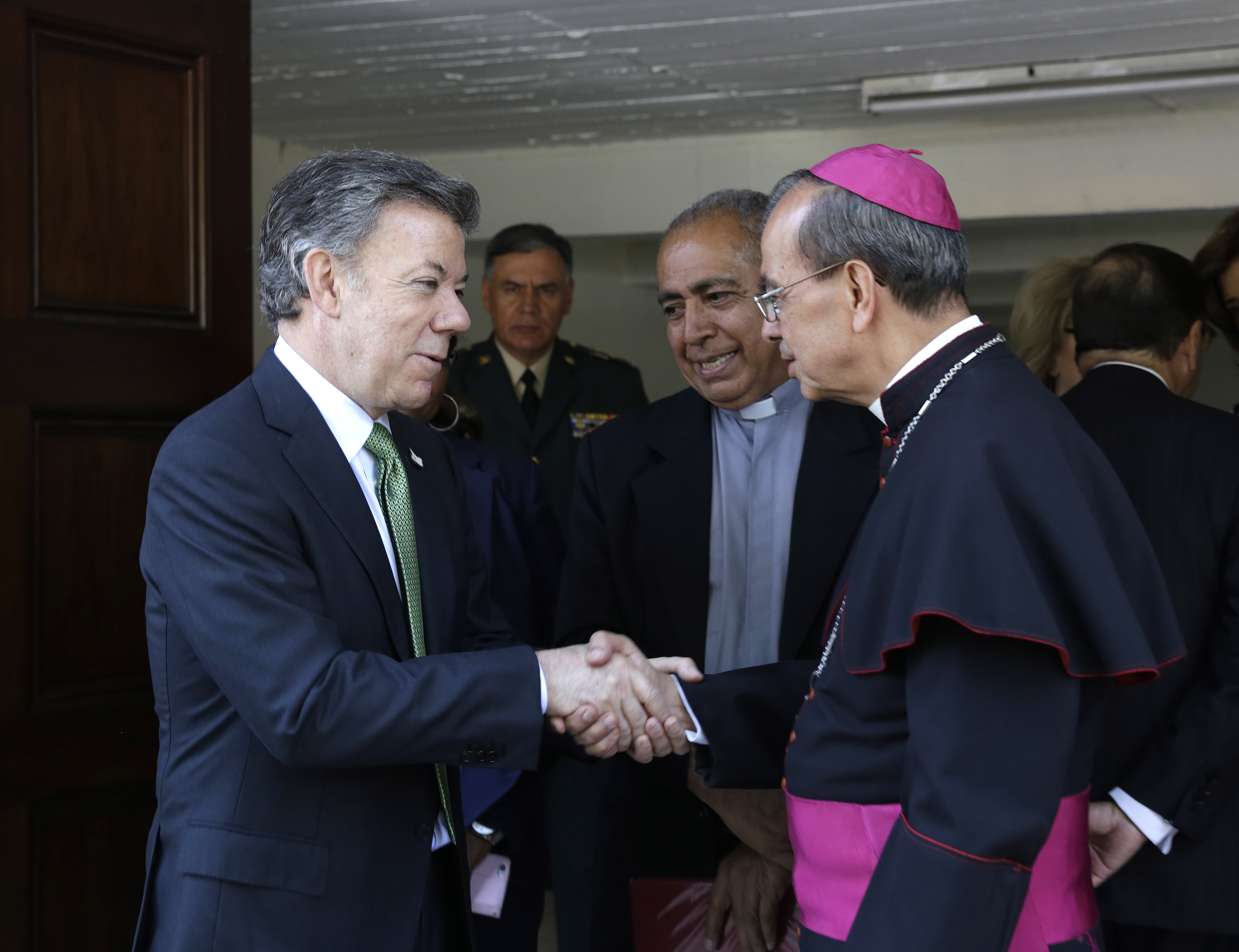
Rosa Chávez meets with Colombian President Juan Manuel Santos, 2016

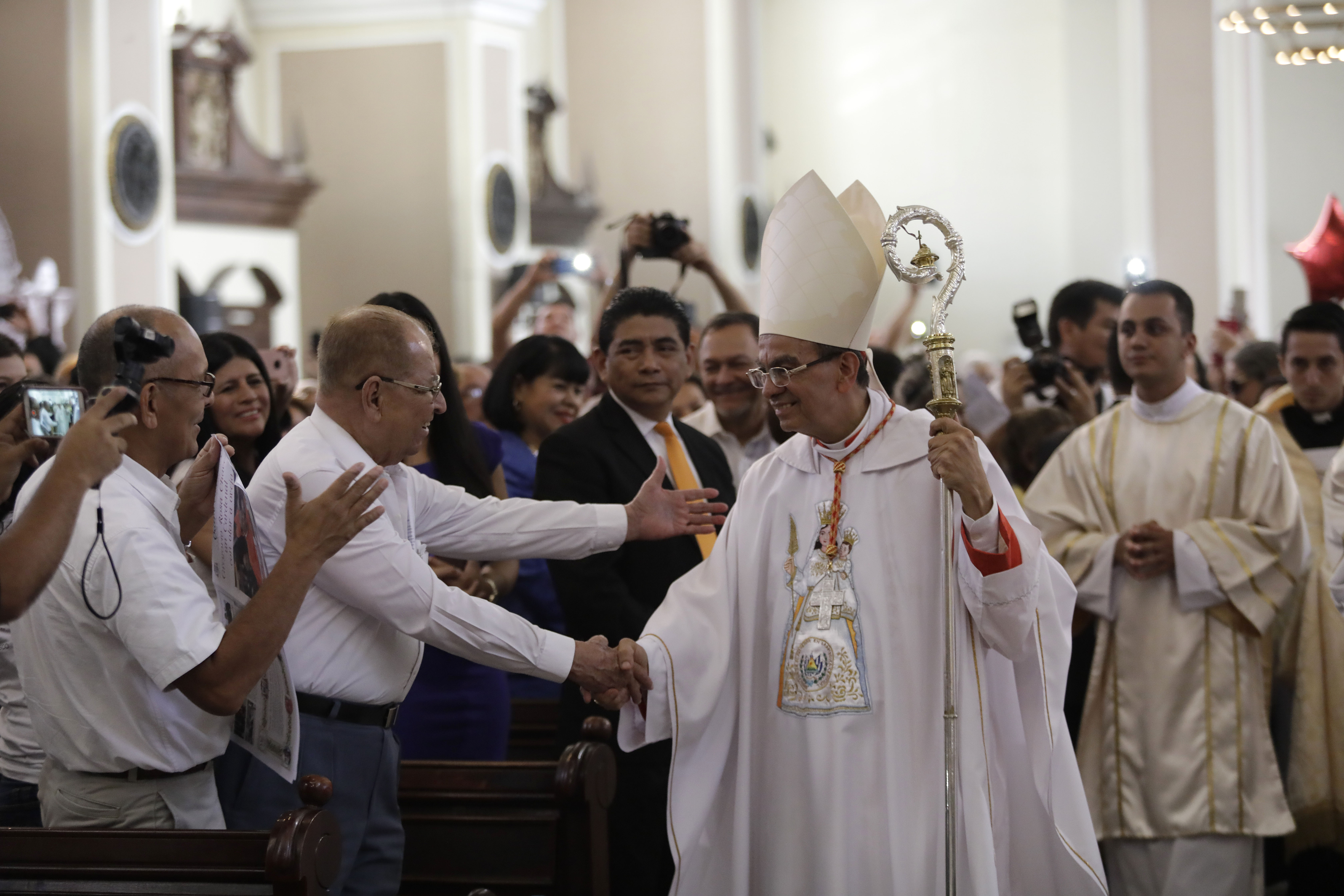
Rosa Chávez at a Mass at the metropolitan cathedral, 8 July 2017

On 21 May 2017, Pope Francis announced that he would make Rosa a cardinal. He received the news at 5:00am in a telephone call and later told the press: "I thought it was a joke. I never thought that this could happen to me". Shortly after he received the news, Chávez visited to the tomb of Romero. Rosa attributed his appointment as a cardinal as a recognition and an honor reserved for Romero. He said that he believed that Romero was a cardinal in his blood and he therefore would be named as one in Romero's name. Rosa was elevated as the Cardinal-Priest of Santissimo Sacramento a Tor de' Schiavi on 28 June 2017. He took formal possession of his titular church on 2 July. At a Mass on 8 July 2017 he said that Pope Francis had asked him to go to Seoul in South Korea for a meeting on how to achieve peace with their neighbor North Korea. Francis made him a member of the Dicastery for Promoting Integral Human Development on 23 December 2017.

Rosa has been outspoken in the past about government abuses and once named alleged killers of six Jesuits as well as their housekeeper and her daughter slain in 1989; he received death threats following this and was accused of being a communist. The death of Arturo Rivera prompted expectations that Rosa would succeed him as the metropolitan archbishop though he never ascended to the position. The conflict in El Salvador ended in 1992, but it was Rosa Chávez who participated in the negotiations from 1984 to 1989 between the Salvadoran government and the Farabundo Martí National Liberation Front.

He begins in the morning listening to Vatican Radio and does not go to sleep until he has read important national and international newspapers. He was the President of Caritas El Salvador and Caritas Latin America and Caribbean. He is the pastor at the San Francisco parish church.

Pope Francis accepted his resignation as auxiliary bishop on 4 October 2022.

== Óscar Romero ==
Rosa first met Óscar Romero circa 1956 while Romero was a priest and the former was a seminarian. He worked for Romero following the conclusion of his philosophical studies for around twelve months and the two became good friends.

Rosa has been a vocal advocate for the canonization of Óscar Romero and attended his beatification in mid-2015.

He confirmed on his Facebook page in a post that he had an evening discussion with Pope Francis who alluded to the fact that he might visit El Salvador in 2018 to canonize Romero. However, Rosa Chávez later confirmed in a recording the archdiocese released not long after that the post was false and that he did not have social media pages. He said that no papal visit nor canonization was scheduled.

== Coat of arms ==
The new coat of arms for Rosa Chávez was unveiled in the week leading up to his elevation as a cardinal. The shield is split into quarters with a golden star representing his devotion to the Mother of God in the upper-left. There is a palm frond in the upper-right meant to depict the Salvadoran martyrs since a palm represents martyrdom.

The bottom-left depicts rosemary which acknowledges Saint Óscar Romero who used that image on his own coat of arms. The bottom-right has two hands shaking one another as a means of depicting an option for the poor which is a dimension of the social magisterium that appeals to Rosa Chávez.

Catholic Church titles
Preceded by Luis Alberto Luna Tobar	— TITULAR — Titular Bishop of Mulli; 17 February 1982 – 28 June 2017	Succeeded by Jayakody Aratchige Don Anton Jayakody
Preceded by Marco René Revelo Contreras	Auxiliary Bishop of San Salvador; 17 February 1982 – 4 October 2022	Incumbent
Titular church established	Cardinal-Priest of Santissimo Sacramento a Tor de' Schiavi; 28 June 2017 –	Incumbent
