= 1979 in El Salvador =

- Decades: 1950s; 1960s; 1970s; 1980s; 1990s
- See also: Other events of 1979; Timeline of Salvadoran history

The following lists events that happened in 1979 in El Salvador.

== Incumbents ==
- President: Carlos Humberto Romero (until 15 October), Revolutionary Government Junta (starting 15 October)
- Vice President: Julio Ernesto Astacio (until 15 October), Vacant (starting 15 October)

== Events ==
=== October ===
- 15 October – The Armed Forces of El Salvador deposed President Humberto Romero in a military coup d'état and established the Revolutionary Government Junta. The Salvadoran Civil War began.

=== Deaths ===
- 20 January – Octavio Ortiz, Catholic priest (b. 1944)
- 20 June – Rafael Palacios, Catholic priest (b. ?)
- 4 August – Napoleón Macías, Catholic priest (b. ?)
