= Óscar Romero =

Archbishop of San Salvador from 1977 until his assassination in 1980

Saint Óscar Romero
- Archbishop of San Salvador
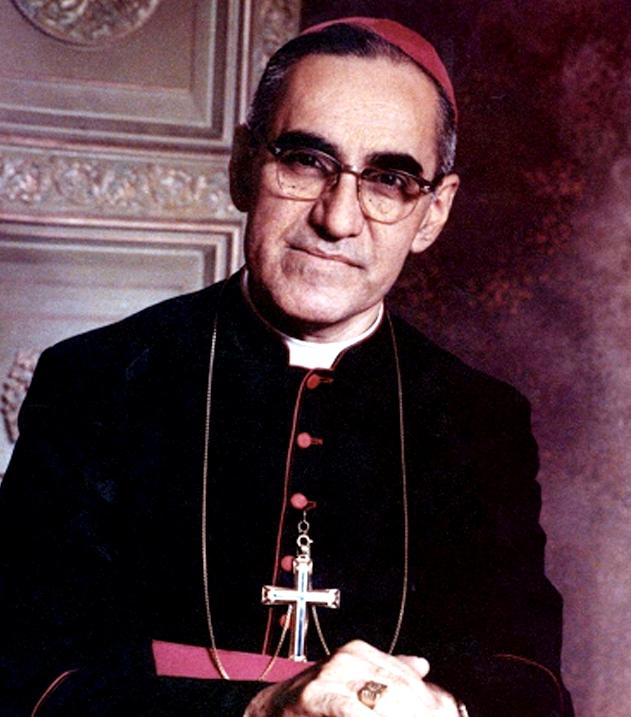
- Romero in 1978 on a visit to Rome
- Church: Catholic Church
- Archdiocese: San Salvador
- Appointed: 3 February 1977
- Installed: 22 February 1977
- Term ended: 24 March 1980
- Predecessor: Luis Chávez y González
- Successor: Arturo Rivera y Damas
- Other posts: Auxiliary Bishop of San Salvador; Titular Bishop of Tambeae; Bishop of Santiago de María

Orders
- Ordination: 4 April 1942
- Consecration: 25 April 1970 by Girolamo Prigione

Personal details
- Born: Óscar Arnulfo Romero y Galdámez; 15 August 1917 Ciudad Barrios, San Miguel, El Salvador
- Died: 24 March 1980 (aged 62) Chapel of Hospital de la Divina Providencia, San Salvador, El Salvador
- Cause of death: Assassination by gunshot
- Buried: Metropolitan Cathedral of San Salvador, San Salvador
- Denomination: Catholicism
- Motto: Sentire cum ecclesia (Latin for 'To feel with the Church')
- Signature: Óscar Romero's signature

- Coat of arms: Óscar Romero's coat of arms

Sainthood
- Feast day: 24 March
- Venerated in: Catholic Church; Anglican Communion; Lutheranism
- Beatified: 23 May 2015; Plaza El Salvador de Mundo, San Salvador, El Salvador by Angelo Amato, representing Pope Francis
- Canonized: 14 October 2018; Saint Peter's Square, Vatican City by Pope Francis
- Attributes: Episcopal vestments Crown of martyrdom Martyr's palm Rosary
- Patronage: Christian communicators; El Salvador; The Americas; Archdiocese of San Salvador; Persecuted Christians; Caritas International (co-patron); Cainta, Rizal, Philippines (Quasi-Parish)

Ordination history
History
Priestly ordination
- Date: 4 April 1942
- Place: Rome, Italy
Episcopal consecration
- Principal consecrator: Girolamo Prigione
- Co-consecrators: Luis Chávez y González and Arturo Rivera y Damas
- Date: 21 June 1970

Óscar Arnulfo Romero y Galdámez (15 August 1917 – 24 March 1980) was a prelate of the Catholic Church in El Salvador; he served as Auxiliary Bishop of the Archdiocese of San Salvador, the Titular Bishop of Tambeae, as Bishop of Santiago de María, and finally as the fourth Archbishop of San Salvador. As archbishop, Romero spoke out against social injustice and violence amid the escalating conflict between the military government and left-wing insurgents that led to the Salvadoran Civil War. In 1980, Romero was fatally shot by an assassin while celebrating Mass. Though no one was ever convicted for the crime, investigations by the UN-created Truth Commission for El Salvador concluded that Major Roberto D'Aubuisson, a death squad leader and later founder of the right-wing Nationalist Republican Alliance (ARENA) political party, had ordered the killing.

In 1997, Pope John Paul II bestowed upon Romero the title of Servant of God, and a cause for his beatification was opened by the church. The cause stalled but was reopened by Pope Benedict XVI in 2012. Romero was declared a martyr by Pope Francis on 3 February 2015, paving the way for his beatification on 23 May 2015. During Romero's beatification, Pope Francis declared that his "ministry was distinguished by his particular attention to the most poor and marginalized." Pope Francis canonized Romero on 14 October 2018.

Initially seen as a social conservative at the time of his appointment as archbishop in 1977, Romero was deeply affected by the murder of his friend and fellow priest Rutilio Grande and thereafter became an outspoken critic of the military government of El Salvador. Hailed by supporters of liberation theology, Romero's relationship with this theology was debated and initially led to impediments in his beatification process, with both denials and affirmations of Romero adhering to it. According to his biographer Michael E. Lee, since Romero's theological thought and homilies extensively utilized the theme of liberation, and Romero borrowed numerous controversial elements of liberation theology, he "can be seen as an exemplar of liberation theology". Similarly, Peter McLaren also argued that "Archbishop Oscar Arnulfo Romero adopted an outspoken stance in favor of 'liberation theology'".

In 2010, the United Nations General Assembly proclaimed 24 March as the "International Day for the Right to the Truth Concerning Gross Human Rights Violations and for the Dignity of Victims" in recognition of Romero's role in the defence of human rights. Romero actively denounced violations of the human rights of the most vulnerable people and defended the principles of protecting lives, promoting human dignity and opposing all forms of violence. Archbishop José Luis Escobar Alas, one of Romero's successors as Archbishop of San Salvador, asked Pope Francis to proclaim Romero a Doctor of the Church, which is an acknowledgement from the church that his religious teachings were orthodox and had a significant impact on its philosophy and theology.

Latin American church groups often proclaim Romero an unofficial patron saint of the Americas and El Salvador; Catholics in El Salvador often refer to him as San Romero, as well as Monseñor Romero. On November 17, 2026, the Catholic Church divulged a September decision to proclaim him Patron Saint of the bishops of Central America.

Outside of Catholicism, Romero is honoured by other Christian denominations, including the Church of England and Anglican Communion, through the Calendar in Common Worship, as well as in at least one Lutheran liturgical calendar. Romero is also one of the ten 20th-century martyrs depicted in statues above the Great West Door of Westminster Abbey in London.

== Early life ==
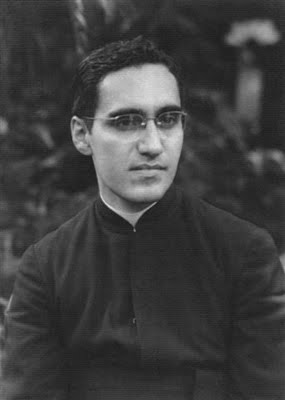
Romero in 1941

Óscar Arnulfo Romero y Galdámez was born on 15 August 1917 in Ciudad Barrios, San Miguel, El Salvador; his parents were Santos Romero Garcilazo and Guadalupe de Jesús Galdámez Portillo. Romero was baptized on 11 May 1919 at the age of one by the priest Cecilio Morales.

Romero entered the local public school, which offered only grades one through three. When finished with public school, Romero was privately tutored by a teacher, Anita Iglesias, until the age of thirteen. During this time Romero's father trained him in carpentry. Romero showed exceptional proficiency as an apprentice. His father wanted to offer his son the skill of a trade, because in El Salvador studies seldom led to employment, however, Romero broached the idea of studying for the priesthood, which did not surprise those who knew him.

== Priesthood ==
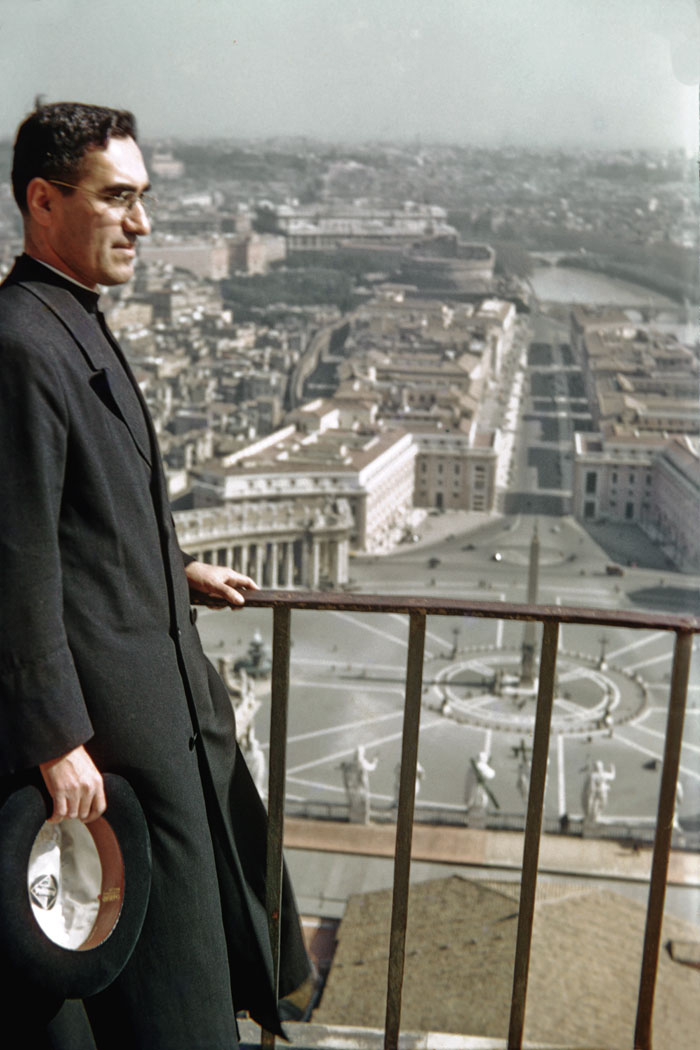
Romero in 1942 at the Vatican

Romero entered the minor seminary in San Miguel at the age of thirteen. He left the seminary for three months to return home when his mother became ill after the birth of her eighth child; during this time he worked with two of his brothers in a gold mine near Ciudad Barrios. After graduation, he enrolled in the national seminary in San Salvador. He completed his studies at the Gregorian University in Rome, where he received a Licentiate in Theology cum laude in 1941, but had to wait a year to be ordained because he was younger than the required age. He was ordained in Rome on 4 April 1942. His family could not attend his ordination because of travel restrictions due to World War II. Romero remained in Italy to obtain a doctoral degree in theology, specializing in ascetical theology and Christian perfection according to Luis de la Puente. Before finishing, in 1943 at the age of 26, he was summoned back home from Italy by his bishop. He traveled home with a good friend, Father Valladares, who was also doing doctoral work in Rome. On the route home, they made stops in Spain and Cuba, where they were detained by the Cuban police, likely for having come from Fascist Italy, and were placed in a series of internment camps. After several months in prison, Valladares became sick and Redemptorist priests helped to have the two transferred to a hospital. From the hospital they were released from Cuban custody and sailed on to Mexico, then traveled overland to El Salvador.

Romero was first assigned to serve as a parish priest in Anamorós, but then moved to San Miguel where he worked for over 20 years. He promoted various apostolic groups, started an Alcoholics Anonymous group, helped in the construction of San Miguel's cathedral, and supported devotion to Our Lady of Peace. He was later appointed rector of the inter-diocesan seminary in San Salvador. Emotionally and physically exhausted by his work in San Miguel, Romero took a retreat in January 1966 where he visited a priest for confession and a psychiatrist. He was diagnosed by the psychiatrist as having obsessive-compulsive personality disorder and by priests with scrupulosity.

In 1966, he was chosen to be Secretary of the Bishops Conference for El Salvador. He also became the director of the archdiocesan newspaper Orientación, which became fairly conservative while he was editor, defending the traditional Magisterium of the Catholic Church.

== Bishop and Archbishop ==
On 25 April 1970, Romero was appointed an auxiliary bishop for the Archdiocese of San Salvador and as the titular bishop of Tambeae. He was consecrated on 21 June by Girolamo Prigione, titular Archbishop of Lauriacum. On 15 October 1974, he was appointed Bishop of the Diocese of Santiago de María, a poor, rural region.

On 3 February 1977, Romero was appointed Archbishop of San Salvador, assuming the position on 22 February. While this appointment was welcomed by the government, many priests were disappointed, especially those openly supportive of Marxist ideology. The progressive priests feared that his conservative reputation would negatively affect liberation theology's commitment to the poor.

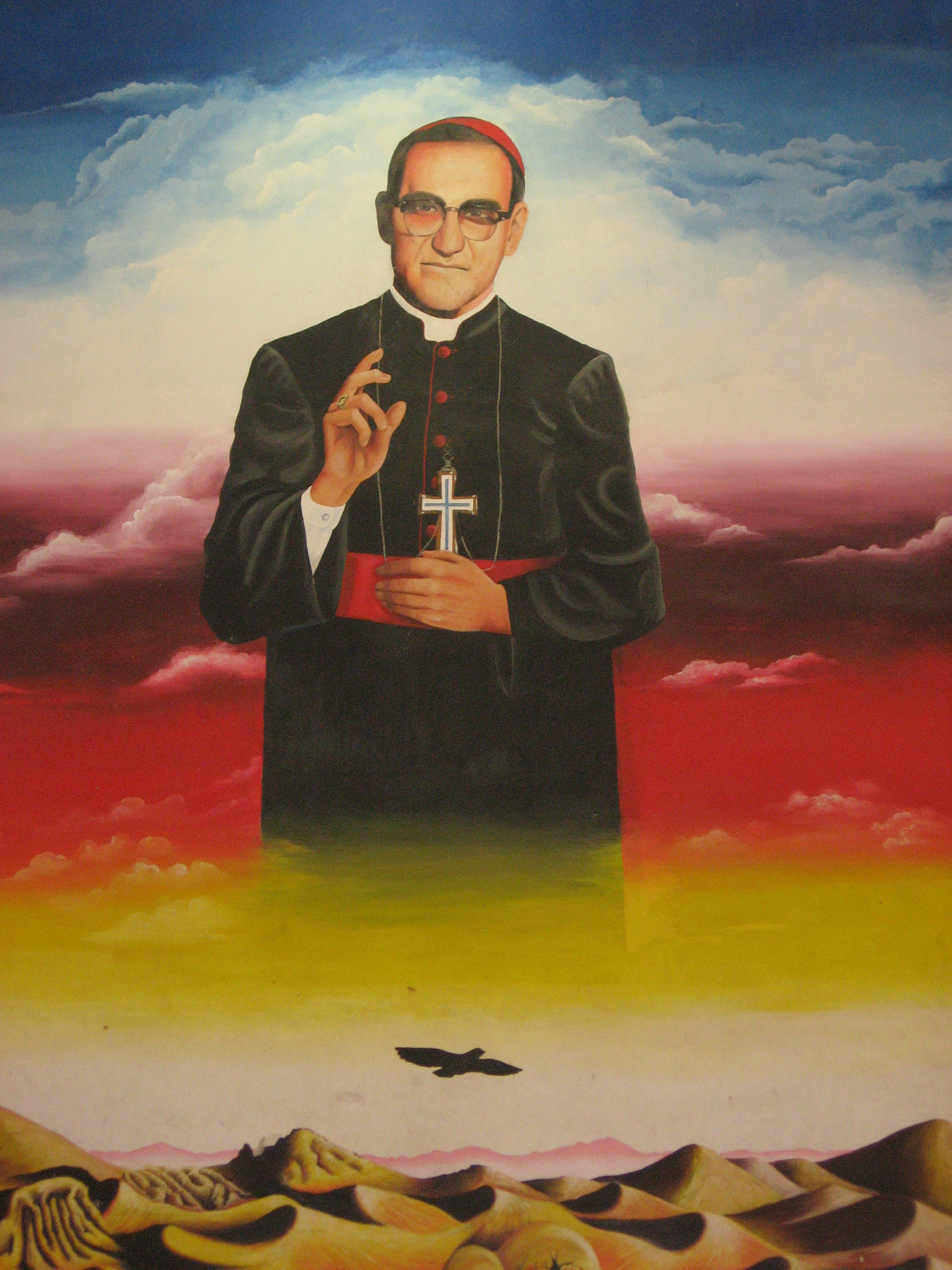
A mural of Óscar Romero

On 12 March 1977, Rutilio Grande, a Jesuit priest and personal friend of Romero who had been creating self-reliance groups among the poor, was assassinated. His death had a profound impact on Romero, who later stated: "When I looked at Rutilio lying there dead I thought, 'If they have killed him for doing what he did, then I too have to walk the same path.'" Romero urged the government to investigate, but they ignored his request. Furthermore, the censored press remained silent.

Tension was noted by the closure of schools and the lack of Catholic priests invited to participate in government. In response to Grande's murder, Romero revealed an activism that had not been evident earlier, speaking out against poverty, social injustice, assassinations and torture.

On 15 October 1979, the Revolutionary Government Junta (JRG) came to power amidst a wave of human rights abuses by paramilitary right-wing groups and the government, in an escalation of violence that would become the Salvadoran Civil War. Romero criticized the United States for giving military aid to the new government and wrote an open letter to President Jimmy Carter in February 1980, warning that increased U.S. military aid would "undoubtedly sharpen the injustice and the political repression inflicted on the organized people, whose struggle has often been for their most basic human rights." This letter was then sent, via telegram, from the U.S. embassy in El Salvador to Washington, D.C. Carter did not directly respond to the letter; instead, Cyrus Vance, the Secretary of State, wrote a telegram back to the U.S. embassy. The telegram carried a very contradictory message, both stating that the United States will not interfere but will respond to the Revolutionary Government Junta's requests. It is unknown if Archbishop Romero received the telegram.

On 11 May 1979, Romero met with Pope John Paul II and unsuccessfully attempted to obtain a Vatican condemnation of the Salvadoran military regime for committing human rights violations and its support of death squads, and expressed his frustration in working with clergy who cooperated with the government. He was encouraged by Pope John Paul II to maintain episcopal unity as a top priority.

As a result of his humanitarian efforts, Romero began to be noticed internationally. In February 1980, he was given an honorary doctorate by the Catholic University of Louvain.

=== Statements on persecution of the church ===
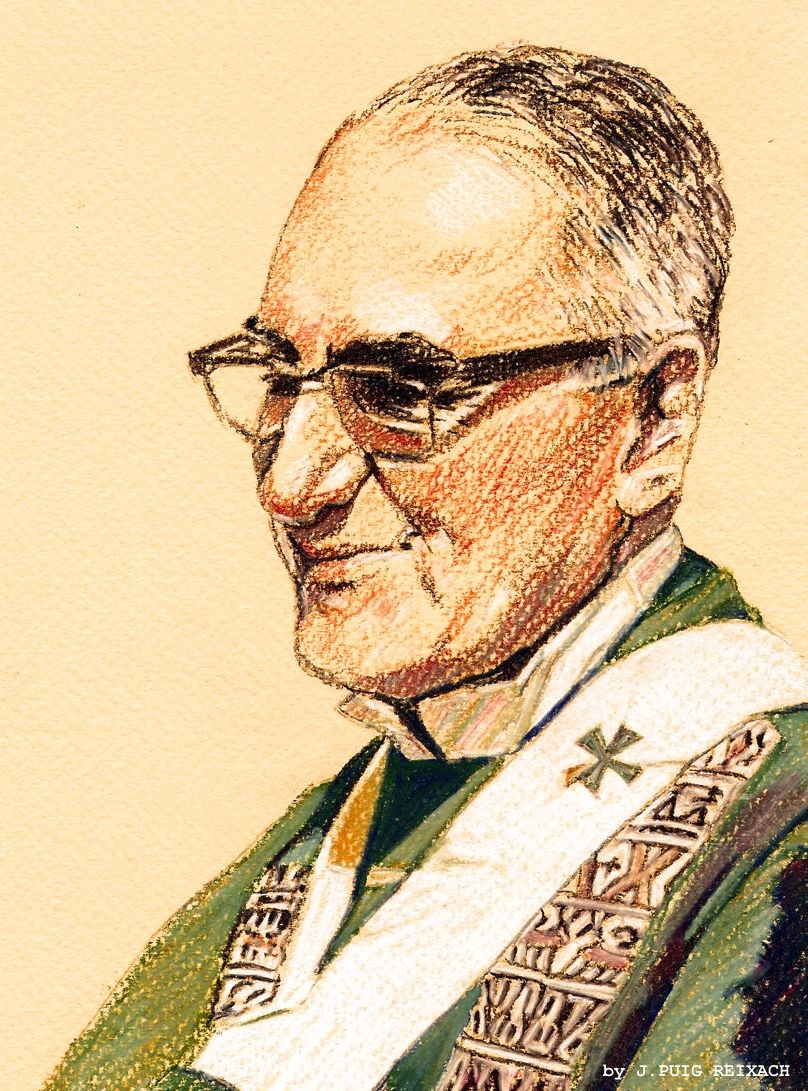
Óscar Romero (pastel) by J. Puig Reixach (2013)

Romero denounced the persecution of members of the Catholic Church who had worked on behalf of the poor:

In less than three years, more than fifty priests have been attacked, threatened, calumniated. Six are already martyrs – they were murdered. Some have been tortured and others expelled [from the country]. Nuns have also been persecuted. The archdiocesan radio station and educational institutions that are Catholic or of a Christian inspiration have been attacked, threatened, intimidated, even bombed. Several parish communities have been raided. If all this has happened to persons who are the most evident representatives of the Church, you can guess what has happened to ordinary Christians, to the campesinos, catechists, lay ministers, and to the ecclesial base communities. There have been threats, arrests, tortures, murders, numbering in the hundreds and thousands.... But it is important to note why [the Church] has been persecuted. Not any and every priest has been persecuted, not any and every institution has been attacked. That part of the church has been attacked and persecuted that put itself on the side of the people and went to the people's defense. Here again we find the same key to understanding the persecution of the church: the poor.

— Óscar Romero, Speech at the Université catholique de Louvain, Belgium, 2 February 1980.

=== Popular radio sermons ===
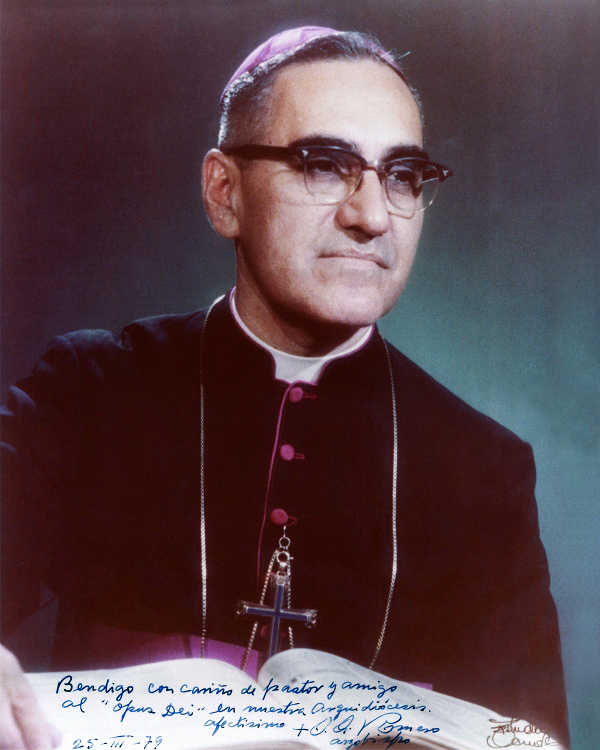
Romero in 1979

By the time of his death, Romero had gained an enormous following among Salvadorans. He did this largely through broadcasting his weekly sermons across El Salvador on the church's station, YSAX, "except when it was bombed off the air". In these sermons, he listed disappearances, tortures, murders, and much more each Sunday. This was followed by an hour-long speech on the radio the following day. On the importance of these broadcasts, one writer noted that "the archbishop's Sunday sermon was the main source in El Salvador about what was happening. It was estimated to have the largest listenership of any programme in the country." According to listener surveys, 73% of the rural population and 47% of the urban listened regularly. Similarly, his diocesan weekly paper Orientación carried lists of cases of torture and repression every week.

== Theology ==
According to Jesús Delgado, his biographer and postulator of the cause for his canonization, Romero agreed with the Catholic vision of liberation theology and not with the materialist vision: "A journalist once asked him: 'Do you agree with Liberation Theology' And Romero answered: "Yes, of course. However, there are two theologies of liberation. One is that which sees liberation only as material liberation. The other is that of Paul VI. I am with Paul VI." However, Romero had a close connection with a prominent and controversial liberation theologian Jon Sobrino. Romero greatly admired a minor figure in liberation theology, bishop of Argentina Eduardo Pironio, whom he called "a holy bishop" and "a great friend". While Pironio was often criticized as a 'communist' and Romero was even given a book criticizing the bishop, titled "Pironio, Pyromaniac", he dismissed this criticism and referred to Pironio as "a great promoter of authentic liberation in Latin America". In 1977, Romero "adopted an outspoken stance in favor of liberation theology".

In one of his homilies, Romero stated that he studied liberation theology through Pironio; the theology of Pironio endorsed liberation of the poor and marginalized through a social revolution, but also highlighted that the Church could never be separated from the process and that liberation must not be reduced to 'mere activism or to structural changes', because the liberations must also be 'reformed by the Spirit'. Michael E. Lee wrote that while Romero did adhere to liberation theology, it was often underplayed during the period of when liberation theology was looked at with suspicion by the Vatican: "Romero can be seen as an exemplar of liberation theology. His homilies and writings show him reflecting extensively on the theme of liberation, and his assassination is a result of his untiring advocacy for justice in his divided land. Why would some fear this idea or find it difficult to accept? Sadly, the very way that liberation theologies have been treated in Vatican documents provides the clue."

Romero spoke about social sin, a controversial concept in liberation theology that presented capitalism as sinful by nature, and was used by many as an example of a Marxist framework of liberation theology. In his pastoral letter, Romero defined social sin as "the crystallization, in other words, of individuals' sins into permanent structures that keep sin in being, and make its force to be felt by the majority of the people". Michal E. Lee writes of Romero's utilization of liberation theology's anti-capitalist teaching:

Continually, he speaks of the rich or "those who are opposed to a just social order" needing conversion. He prayed for the conversion of those who "do not collaborate in the construction of a more just temporal order," those who "are able to transform society because they have power in their hands," those who "persecute the Church, paid by interests that want to maintain this system that can't be maintained," those who "oppose Christ's reign of justice, peace, and love in the world." The sins of El Salvador, he says, include the abuse of power, the selfish investment of capital, the idolatry of money, and even the refusal to develop oneself so as to contribute to society.

He also argued that the Catholic Church is 'by nature political' and that it 'must respect and support the right of the people to voice and move toward aspirations for liberation in their own way.' He was particularly dedicated to the preferential option for the poor, on which he wrote:

The church would betray its own love for God and its fidelity to the gospel if it stopped being "the voice of the voiceless," a defender of the rights of the poor, a promoter of every just aspiration for liberation, a guide, an empowerer, a humanizer of every legitimate struggle to achieve a more just society.... This demands of the church a greater presence among the poor. It ought to be in solidarity with them, running the risks they run, enduring the persecution that is their fate.

Romero preached that "the most profound social revolution is the serious, supernatural, interior reform of a Christian." He also emphasized: "The liberation of Christ and of His Church is not reduced to the dimension of a purely temporal project. It does not reduce its objectives to an anthropocentric perspective: to a material well-being or only to initiatives of a political or social, economic or cultural order. Much less can it be a liberation that supports or is supported by violence." Romero expressed several times his disapproval of divisiveness in the church. In a sermon preached on 11 November 1979 he said: "the other day, one of the persons who proclaims liberation in a political sense was asked: 'For you, what is the meaning of the Church'?" He said that the activist "answered with these scandalous words: 'There are two churches, the church of the rich and the church of the poor. We believe in the church of the poor but not in the church of the rich.'" Romero declared, "Clearly these words are a form of demagogy and I will never admit a division of the Church." He added, "There is only one Church, the Church that Christ preached, the Church to which we should give our whole hearts. There is only one Church, a Church that adores the living God and knows how to give relative value to the goods of this earth."

=== Spiritual life ===
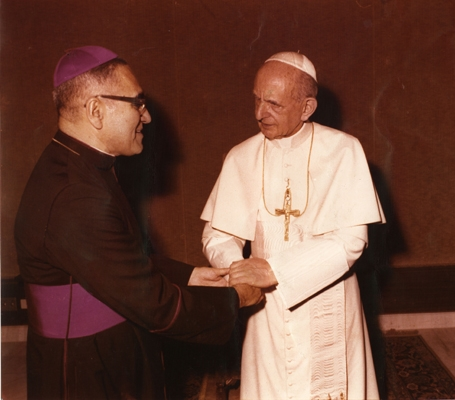
Pope Paul VI and Romero, 1978

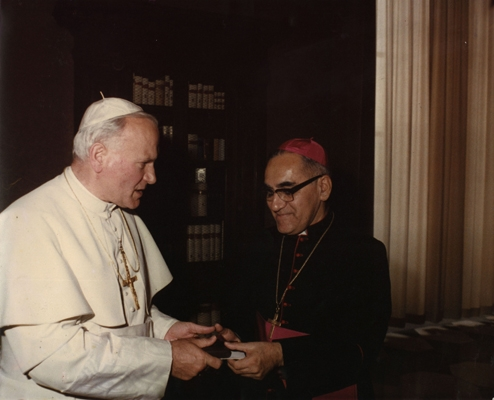
John Paul II and Romero, 1979

Romero noted in his diary on 4 February 1943: "In recent days the Lord has inspired in me a great desire for holiness. I have been thinking of how far a soul can ascend if it lets itself be possessed entirely by God." Commenting on this passage, James R. Brockman, Romero's biographer and author of Romero: A Life, said that "All the evidence available indicates that he continued on his quest for holiness until the end of his life. But he also matured in that quest."

According to Brockman, Romero's spiritual journey had some of these characteristics:

- love for the Church of Rome, shown by his episcopal motto, "to be of one mind with the Church", a phrase he took from St. Ignatius' Spiritual Exercises;
- a tendency to make a very deep examination of conscience;
- an emphasis on sincere piety;
- mortification and penance through his duties;
- providing protection for his chastity;
- spiritual direction;
- "being one with the Church incarnated in this people which stands in need of liberation";
- eagerness for contemplative prayer and finding God in others;
- fidelity to the will of God;
- self-offering to Jesus Christ.

Romero was a strong advocate of the spiritual charism of Opus Dei. He received weekly spiritual direction from a priest of the Opus Dei movement. In 1975 he wrote in support of the cause of canonization of Opus Dei's founder, "Personally, I owe deep gratitude to the priests involved with the Work, to whom I have entrusted with much satisfaction the spiritual direction of my own life and that of other priests."

== Assassination ==
Photograph that appeared in El País on 7 November 2009 with the information that the state of El Salvador recognized its responsibility in the crime.

On 23 March 1980, Archbishop Romero delivered a sermon in which he called on Salvadoran soldiers, as Christians, to obey God's higher order and to stop carrying out the government's repression and violations of basic human rights.

Romero spent 24 March in a recollection organized by Opus Dei, a monthly gathering of priest friends led by Fernando Sáenz Lacalle. On that day they reflected on the priesthood. That evening, Romero celebrated Mass at a small chapel at Hospital de la Divina Providencia (Divine Providence Hospital), a church-run hospital specializing in oncology and care for the terminally ill. Romero finished his sermon, stepped away from the lectern, and took a few steps to stand at the center of the altar.

As Romero finished speaking, a red car came to a stop on the street in front of the chapel. A gunman emerged from the vehicle, stepped to the door of the chapel, and fired one, or possibly two, shots. Romero was struck in the heart, and the vehicle sped off. He died at the Chapel of Hospital de la Divina Providencia in San Salvador.

=== Funeral ===
Romero was buried in the Metropolitan Cathedral of San Salvador. The Funeral Mass on 30 March 1980 in San Salvador was attended by more than 250,000 mourners from all over the world. Viewing this attendance as a protest, Jesuit priest John Dear has said, "Romero's funeral was the largest demonstration in Salvadoran history, some say in the history of Latin America."

At the funeral, Cardinal Ernesto Corripio y Ahumada, speaking as the personal delegate of Pope John Paul II, eulogized Romero as a "beloved, peacemaking man of God", and stated that "his blood will give fruit to brotherhood, love and peace."

==== Massacre at Romero's funeral ====
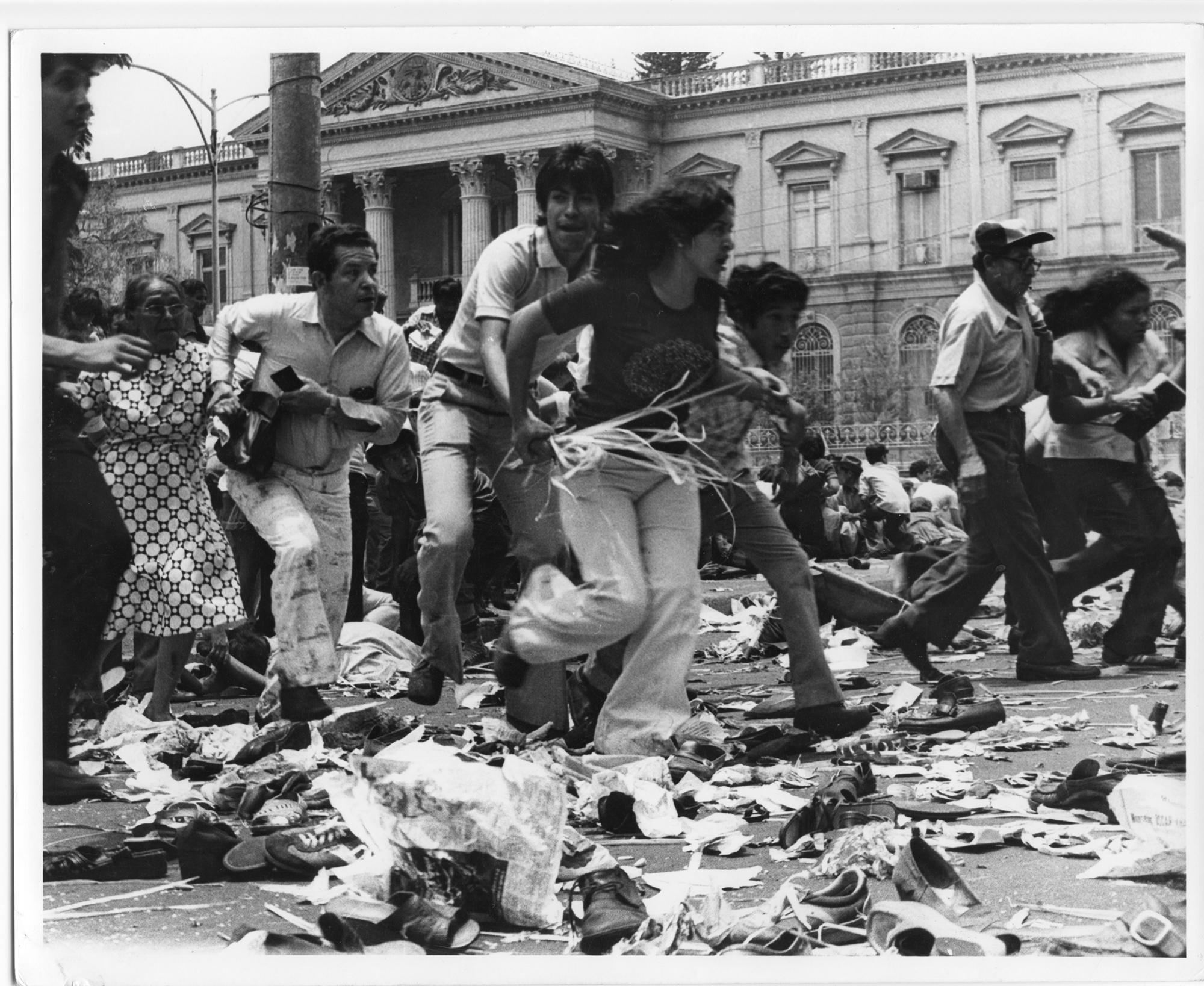
Attendees to Monsignor Romero's funeral run after hearing gunshots in the middle of the crowd, in Plaza Barrios, on Sunday, March 30, 1980.

During the ceremony, smoke bombs exploded on the streets near the cathedral and subsequently, there were rifle shots that came from surrounding buildings, including the National Palace. Many people were killed by gunfire and in the stampede of people running away from the explosions and gunfire. Official sources reported 31 overall casualties, while journalists claimed that between 30 and 50 died. Some witnesses claimed it was government security forces who threw bombs into the crowd, and army sharpshooters, dressed as civilians, who fired into the chaos from the balcony or roof of the National Palace. However, there are contradictory accounts about the course of the events and one historian, Roberto Morozzo della Rocca, stated that "probably, one will never know the truth about the interrupted funeral."

As the gunfire continued, Romero's body was buried in a crypt beneath the sanctuary. Even after the burial, people continued to line up to pay homage to the assassinated prelate.

=== International reaction ===
==== Ireland ====
All sections of Irish political and religious life condemned his assassination, with the Minister for Foreign Affairs Brian Lenihan "expressing shock and revulsion at the murder of Dr Romero", while the leader of the Trócaire charity, Bishop Eamon Casey, revealed that he had received a letter from Romero that very day. The previous October, parliamentarians had given their support to the nomination of Romero for the Nobel Peace Prize. In March each year since the 1980s, the Irish–El Salvador Support Committee holds a mass in honour of Romero.

==== United Kingdom ====
In October 1978, 119 British parliamentarians had nominated Romero for the Nobel Prize for Peace. In this they were supported by 26 members of the United States Congress. When news of the assassination was reported in March 1980, the new Archbishop of Canterbury, Robert Runcie, was about to be enthroned in Canterbury Cathedral. On hearing of Romero's death, one writer observed that Runcie "departed from the ancient traditions to decry the murder of Archbishop Óscar Romero in El Salvador."

==== United States ====
===== Public reaction =====
The United States public's reaction to Archbishop Romero's death was symbolized through the "martyrdom of Romero" as an inspiration to end U.S. military aid to El Salvador. In December 1980 the International Longshoremen's and Warehousemen's Union refused to deliver military equipment destined for the Salvadoran government. The leader of the union, Jim Herman, was known as a supporter of Romero and denounced his death. On 24 March 1984 a protest was held in Los Angeles, California where around 3,000 people, organized by 20 November Coalition, protested U.S. intervention in El Salvador, using the anniversary of the Archbishop's death and his face as a symbol. On 24 March 1990, 10,000 people marched in front of the White House to denounce the military aid that was still flowing from the United States to the Salvadoran government. Protestors carried a bust of the archbishop and quoted some of his speeches, in addition to the event being held on the anniversary of his death. Noted figures Ed Asner and Jennifer Casolo participated in the event.

===== Government response =====
On 25 March 1980, U.S. Secretary of State Cyrus Vance revealed that the White House would continue to fund the Salvadoran government and provide it military aid, in spite of the pleas of Romero and his death immediately prior to this announcement. On 31 March 1983, Roberto D'Aubuisson was allowed entry to the United States by the State Department after deeming him not barred from entry any longer. When asked about D'Aubuisson's association with the assassination of Romero, the Department of State responded that "the allegations have not been substantiated." In November 1993, documents by the Department of State, Department of Defense, and the Central Intelligence Agency were released after pressure by Congress increased. The 12,000 documents revealed that the administrations of Ronald Reagan and George H. W. Bush knew of the assassinations conducted by D'Aubuisson, including that of Romero, yet still worked with him despite this.

=== Investigations into the assassination ===
No one has ever been prosecuted for the assassination or confessed to it to police. Immediately following the assassination, José Napoleón Duarte, the newly appointed foreign minister of El Salvador, actively promulgated a "blame on both sides" propaganda trope in order to provide cover for the lack of official inquiry into the assassination plot.

Subsequent investigations by the United Nations and other international bodies have established that the four assassins were members of a death squad led by D'Aubuisson. Revelations of the D'Aubuisson plot came to light in 1984 when U.S. ambassador Robert White testified before the United States Congress that "there was sufficient evidence" to convict D'Aubuisson of planning and ordering Romero's assassination. In 1993, an official United Nations report identified D'Aubuisson as the man who ordered the killing. D'Aubuisson had strong connections to the Nicaraguan National Guard and to its offshoot the Fifteenth of September Legion and had also planned to overthrow the government in a coup. Later, he founded the political party Nationalist Republican Alliance (ARENA) and organized death squads that systematically carried out politically motivated assassinations and other human rights abuses in El Salvador. Álvaro Rafael Saravia, a former captain in the Salvadoran Air Force, was chief of security for D'Aubuisson and an active member of these death squads. In 2003 a United States human rights organization, the Center for Justice and Accountability, filed a civil action against Saravia. In 2004, he was found liable by a U.S. District Court under the Alien Tort Claims Act (ATCA) (28 U.S.C. § 1350) for aiding, conspiring, and participating in the assassination of Romero. Saravia was ordered to pay $10 million for extrajudicial killing and crimes against humanity pursuant to the ATCA; he has since gone into hiding. On 24 March 2010 – the thirtieth anniversary of Romero's death – Salvadoran President Mauricio Funes offered an official state apology for Romero's assassination. Speaking before Romero's family, representatives of the Catholic Church, diplomats, and government officials, Funes said those involved in the assassination "unfortunately acted with the protection, collaboration, or participation of state agents."

A 2000 article by Tom Gibb, then a correspondent with The Guardian and later with the BBC, attributes the murder to a detective of the Salvadoran National Police named Óscar Pérez Linares, acting on the orders of D'Aubuisson. The article cites an anonymous former death squad member who claimed he had been assigned to guard a house in San Salvador used by a unit of three counter-guerrilla operatives directed by D'Aubuisson. The guard, whom Gibb identified as "Jorge", purported to have witnessed Linares fraternizing with the group, which was nicknamed the "Little Angels", and to have heard them praise Linares for the killing. The article furthermore attributes full knowledge of the assassination to the CIA as far back as 1983. The article reports that both Linares and the Little Angels commander, who Jorge identified as "El Negro Mario", were killed by a CIA-trained Salvadoran special police unit in 1986; the unit had been assigned to investigate the murders. In 1983, U.S. Lt. Col. Oliver North, an aide to then-Vice President George H.W. Bush, is alleged to have personally requested the Salvadoran military to "remove" Linares and several others from their service. Three years later they were pursued and extrajudicially killed – Linares after being found in neighbouring Guatemala. The article cites another source in the Salvadoran military as saying "they knew far too much to live".

In a 2010 article for the Salvadoran online newspaper El Faro, Saravia was interviewed from a mountain hideout. He named D'Aubuisson as giving the assassination order to him over the phone, and said that he and his cohorts drove the assassin to the chapel and paid him 1,000 Salvadoran colónes after the event.

In April 2017, however, in the wake of the overruling of a civil war amnesty law the previous year, a judge in El Salvador, Rigoberto Chicas, allowed the case against the escaped Saravia's alleged role in the murder of Romero to be reopened. On 23 October 2018, days after Romero's canonization, Judge Chicas issued a new arrest warrant for him, and Interpol and the National Police are charged with finding his hideout and apprehending him. As both D'Aubuisson and Linares had already died, they could not be prosecuted.

== Legacy ==
=== International recognition ===
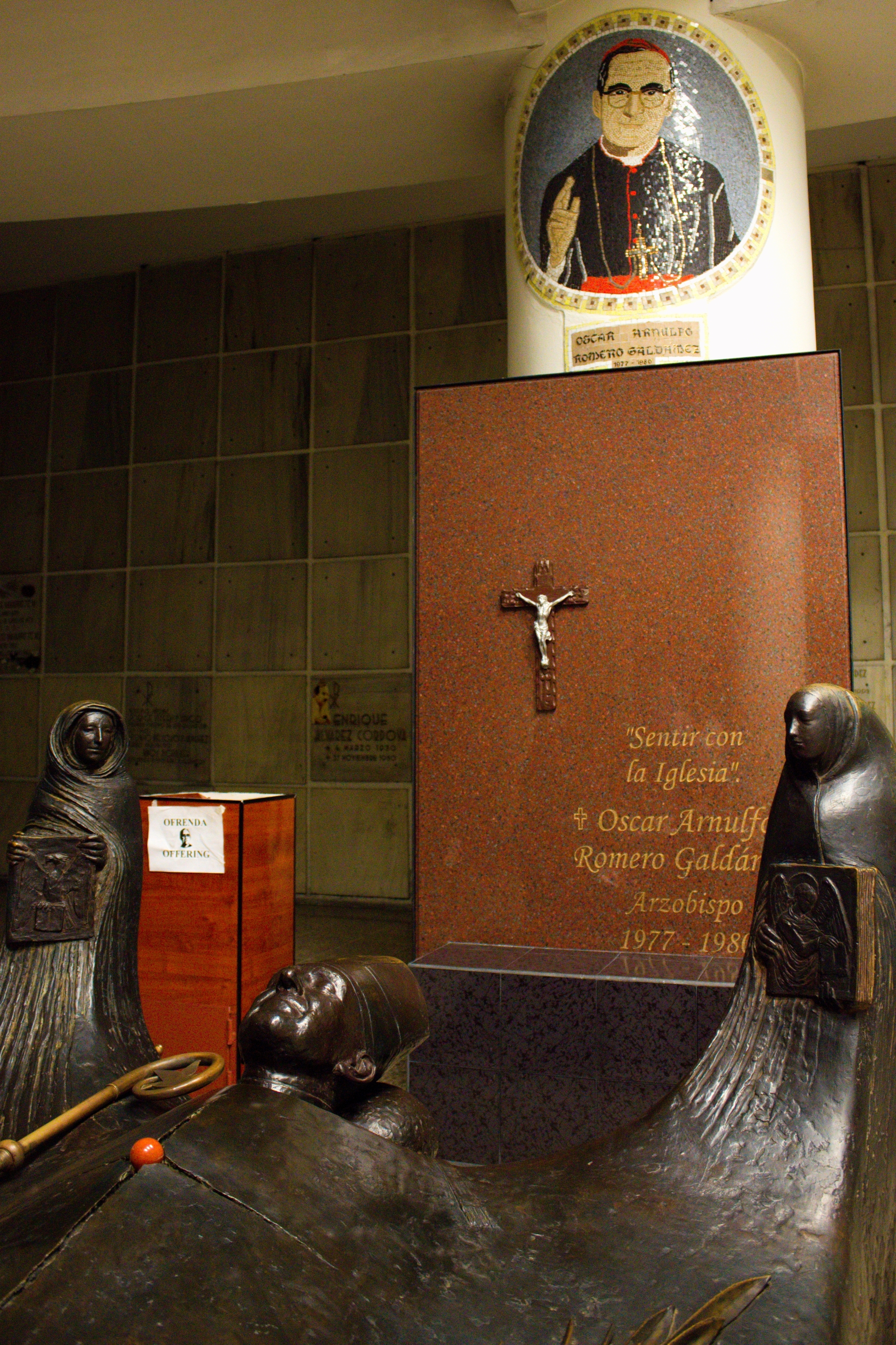
Romero's tomb as seen in 2021

During his first visit to El Salvador in 1983, Pope John Paul II entered the cathedral in San Salvador and prayed at Romero's tomb, despite opposition from the government and from some within the church who strongly opposed liberation theology. Afterwards, the Pope praised Romero as a "zealous and venerated pastor who tried to stop violence". John Paul II also asked for dialogue between the government and opposition to end El Salvador's civil war.

On 7 May 2000, in Rome's Colosseum during the Jubilee Year celebrations, Pope John Paul II commemorated 20th-century martyrs. Of the several categories of martyrs, the seventh consisted of Christians who were killed for defending their brethren in the Americas. Despite the opposition of some social conservatives within the church, John Paul II insisted that Romero be included. He asked the organizers of the event to proclaim Romero "that great witness of the Gospel".

On 21 December 2010, the United Nations General Assembly proclaimed 24 March as the International Day for the Right to the Truth concerning Gross Human Rights Violations and for the Dignity of Victims which recognizes, in particular, the important work and values of Romero.

On 22 March 2011, U.S. President Barack Obama visited Romero's tomb during an official visit to El Salvador. Irish President Michael D. Higgins visited the cathedral and tomb of Romero on 25 October 2013 during a state visit to El Salvador. Famed linguist Noam Chomsky speaks highly of Romero's social work, and refers often to his murder. In 2014, El Salvador's main international airport was named after him, becoming Monseñor Óscar Arnulfo Romero y Galdámez International Airport, and later, San Óscar Arnulfo Romero y Galdámez International Airport in 2018 after his canonization.

Romero is remembered in the Church of England, in the Episcopal Church, and in the Evangelical Lutheran Church in America on 24 March.

== Sainthood ==
=== Process for beatification ===
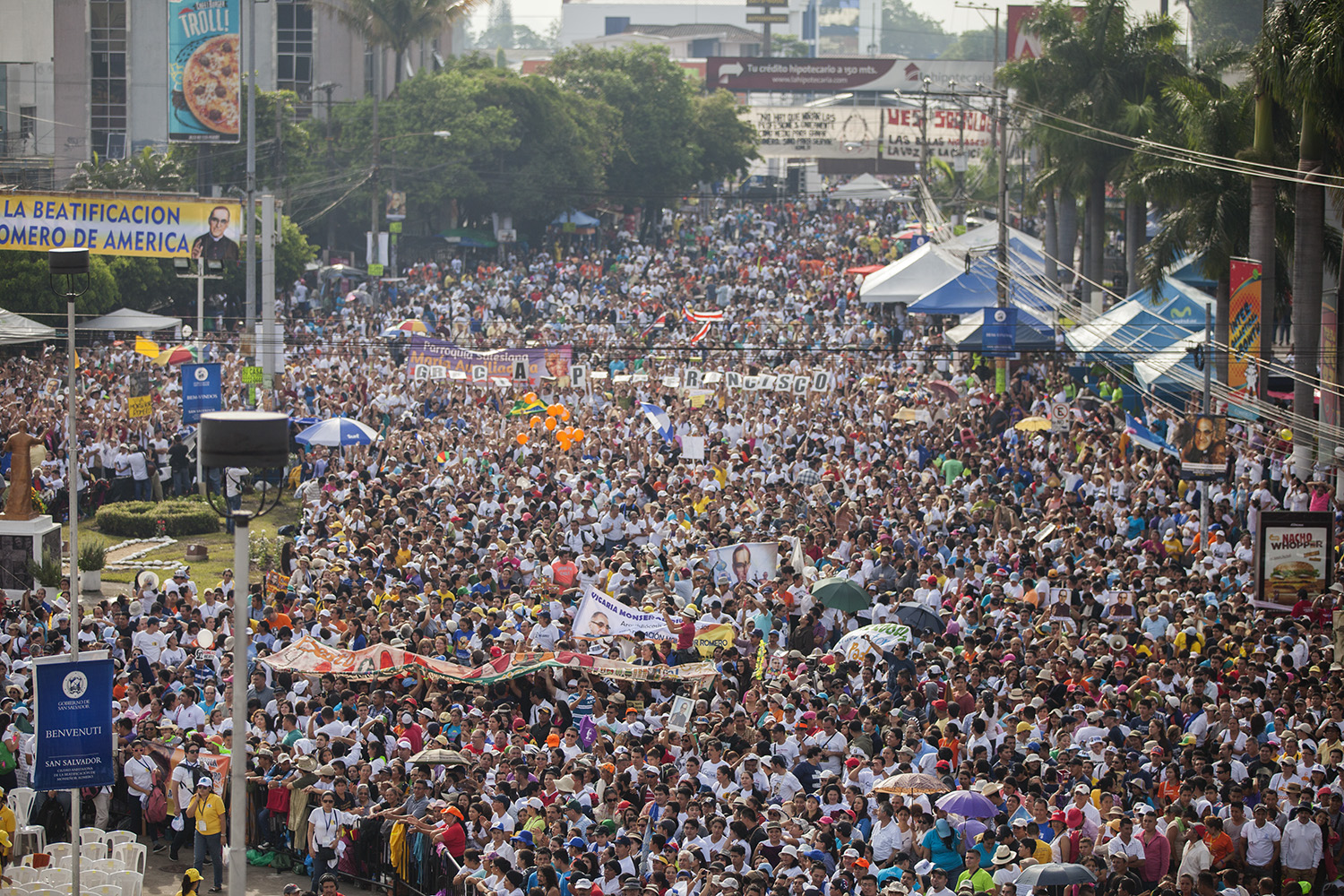
Savior of the World Plaza at the beatification

Romero's sainthood cause at the Vatican was opened in 1993, but the Catholic News Service reported that it "was delayed for years as the Congregation for the Doctrine of the Faith studied his writings, amid wider debate over whether he had been killed for his faith or for political reasons."

In March 2005, Vincenzo Paglia, the Vatican official in charge of the process, announced that Romero's cause had cleared a theological audit by the Congregation for the Doctrine of the Faith, at the time headed by Cardinal Joseph Ratzinger (later elected Pope Benedict XVI) and that beatification could follow within six months. Pope John Paul II died within weeks of those remarks. Predictably, the transition of the new pontiff slowed down the work of canonizations and beatifications. Pope Benedict instituted changes that had the overall effect of reining in the Vatican's so-called "factory of saints". In an October 2005 interview, Cardinal José Saraiva Martins, the Prefect of the Congregation for the Causes of Saints, was asked if Paglia's predictions of a clearance for Romero's beatification remained on track. Saraiva responded, "Not as far as I know today". In November 2005, the Jesuit magazine La Civiltà Cattolica signaled that Romero's beatification was still "years away".

Although Benedict XVI had always been a fierce critic of liberation theology, Paglia reported in December 2012 that the Pope had informed him of the decision to "unblock" the cause and allow it to move forward. However, no progress was made before Benedict's resignation in February 2013. Pope Francis was elected in March 2013, and in September 2013, Archbishop Gerhard Ludwig Müller, Prefect of the Congregation for the Doctrine of the Faith, stated that the Vatican doctrinal office has been "given the green light" to pursue sainthood for Romero.

=== Beatification ===
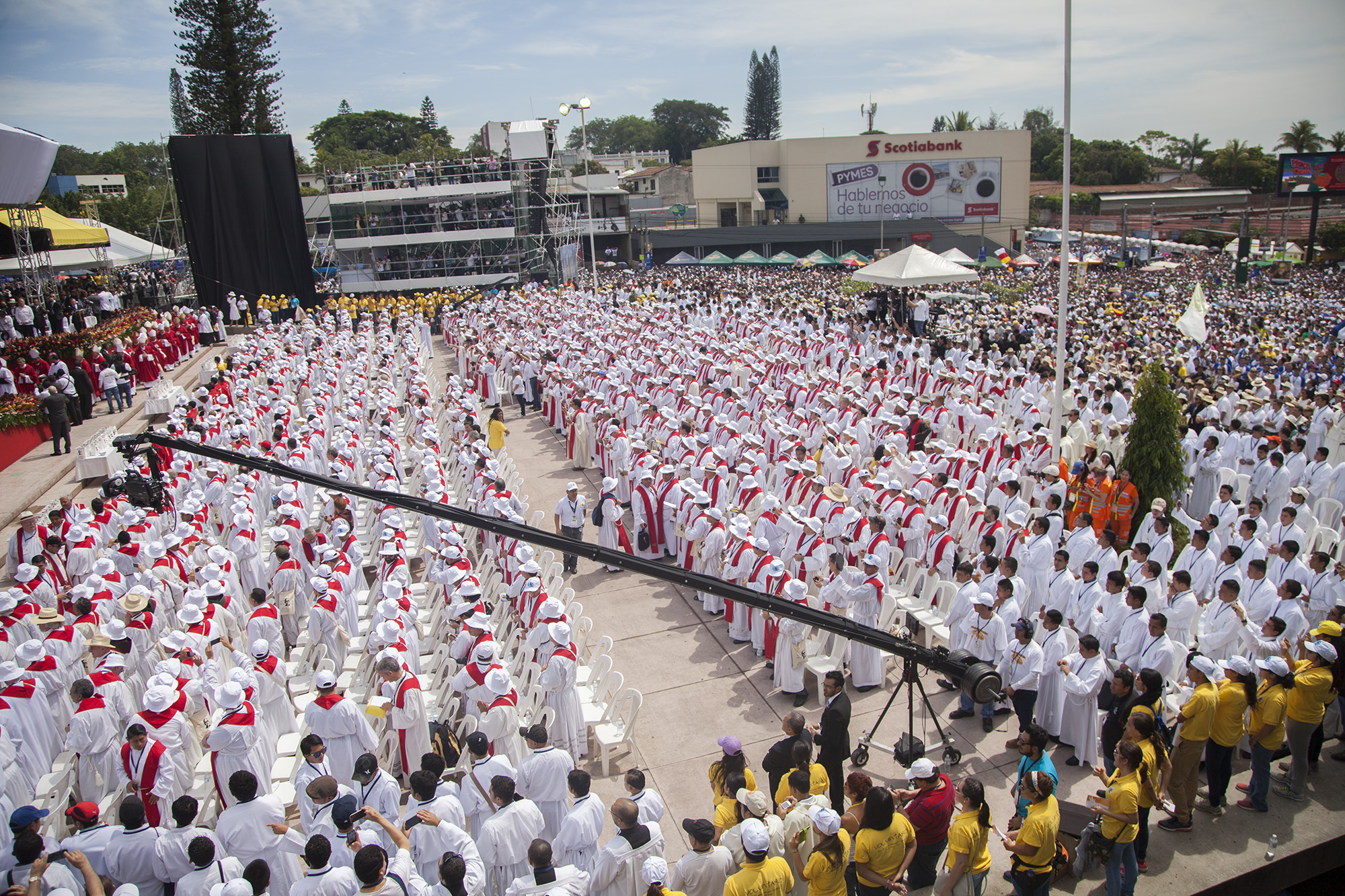
The beatification celebration on 23 May 2015 in San Salvador

On 18 August 2014, Pope Francis said that "[t]he process [of beatification of Romero] was at the Congregation for the Doctrine of the Faith, blocked for 'prudential reasons', so they said. Now it is unblocked." Francis stated, "There are no doctrinal problems and it is very important that [the beatification] is done quickly." The beatification signaled Francis' affirmation of Romero's work with the poor as a major change in the direction of the church since he was elected.

In January 2015, an advisory panel to the Roman Curia's Congregation for the Causes of Saints voted unanimously to recognize Romero as a martyr, and the cardinals who were voting members of the Congregation unanimously recommended to Francis that he be beatified as a martyr (a martyr can be beatified without recognition of a miracle). Archbishop Vincenzo Paglia, the postulator (chief promoter) of the causes of saints, said that Romero's assassination at the altar was intended "to strike the Church that flowed from the Second Vatican Council" and that the motive for his murder "was not caused by motives that were simply political, but by hatred for a faith that, imbued with charity, would not be silent in the face of the injustices that relentlessly and cruelly slaughtered the poor and their defenders." On 3 February 2015, Francis received Cardinal Angelo Amato, Prefect of the Congregation for the Causes of Saints, in a private audience, and authorized Amato to promulgate (officially authorize) Romero's decree of martyrdom, meaning it had gained the Congregation's voting members and the Pope's approval. This cleared the way for the Pope to later set a date for his beatification.

The beatification of Romero was held in San Salvador on 23 May 2015 in the Plaza Salvador del Mundo under the Monumento al Divino Salvador del Mundo. Amato presided over the ceremony on behalf of Francis, who in a letter to the Archbishop of San Salvador José Luis Escobar Alas marked the occasion by calling Romero "a voice that continues to resonate". An estimated 250,000 people attended the service, many watching on large television screens set up in the streets around the plaza.

=== Canonization ===
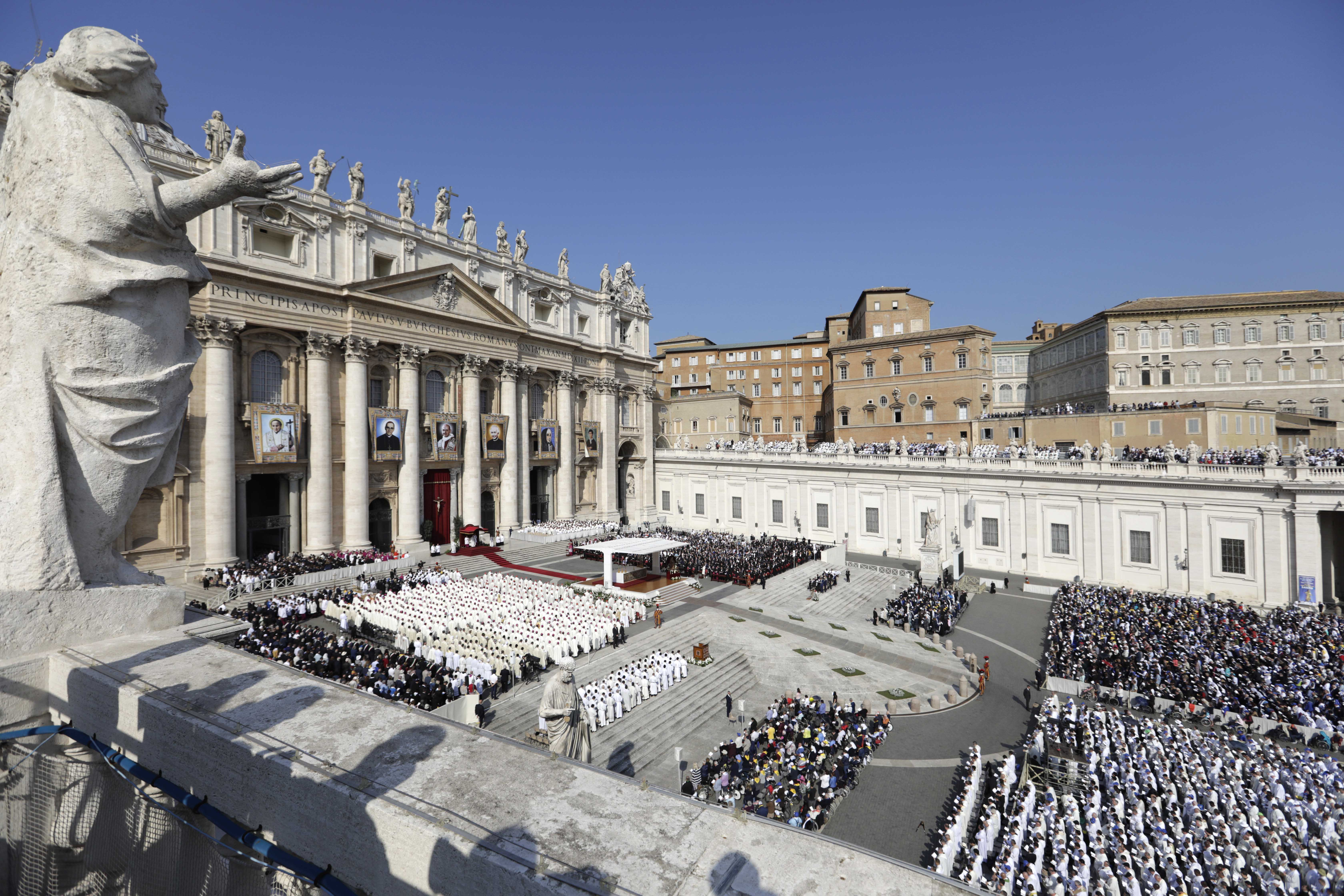
Canonization Mass celebrated on 14 October 2018 in Saint Peter's Square

Three miracles were submitted to the Congregation for the Causes of Saints in Rome in October 2016 that could have led to Romero's canonization. But each of these miracles was rejected after being investigated. A fourth (concerning the pregnant woman Cecilia Maribel Flores) was investigated in a diocesan process in San Salvador that was opened on 31 January 2017 and which concluded its initial investigation on 28 February before documentation was submitted to Rome via the apostolic nunciature. The CCS validated this on 7 April. On 11 August, Paglia celebrated the Romero Centenary Mass in St George's Cathedral, Southwark, in London, where the cross and relics of Romero are preserved. Subsequently, medical experts issued unanimous approval to the presented miracle on 26 October with theologians also confirming their approval on 14 December. The CCS members likewise approved the case on 6 February 2018. Pope Francis approved this miracle on 6 March 2018, allowing for Romero to be canonized and the date was announced at a consistory of cardinals held on 19 May. The canonization was celebrated in Rome's Saint Peter's Square on 14 October 2018.

Previously, there had been hopes that Romero would be canonized during a possible papal visit to El Salvador on 15 August 2017 – the centennial of the late bishop's birth – or that he could be canonized in Panama during World Youth Day in 2019.

Romero was the first Salvadoran to be raised to the altars; the first martyred archbishop of America, the first to be declared a martyr after the Second Vatican Council; and the first native saint of Central America (Peter of Saint Joseph de Betancur, who did all his work for which he was canonized in the city of Santiago de los Caballeros of Guatemala, was from Tenerife, Spain), Romero had already been included on the Anglican Church's list of official saints and on the Lutheran Church's liturgical calendar.

== Homages and cultural references ==
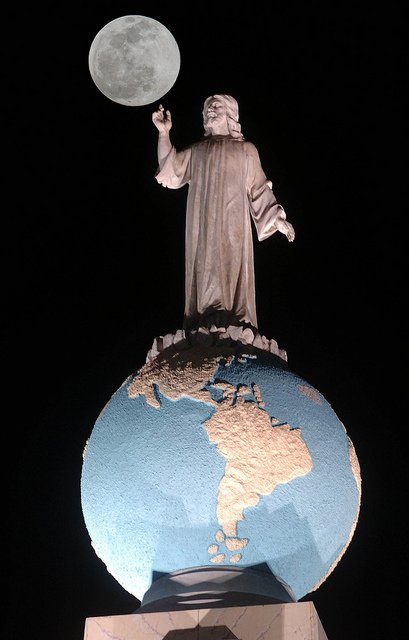
Monumento al Divino Salvador del Mundo in Plaza Salvador del Mundo

=== Institutions ===
- The Romero Centre in Dublin, Ireland, is today an important centre that "promotes Development Education, Arts, Crafts, and Awareness about El Salvador".
- The Christian Initiative Romero is a non-profit organization in Germany working in support of industrial law and human rights in Central American countries.
- The Romero Institute, a nonprofit law and public policy center in Santa Cruz, California, U.S., headed by Daniel Sheehan, was named after Archbishop Romero in 1996.
- In 1989 the Toronto Catholic District School Board opened a secondary school in Toronto, Canada, named after Archbishop Óscar Romero called St. Oscar Romero Catholic Secondary School.
- St. Oscar Romero Catholic Secondary School in Peel Region, Ontario, Canada
- St. Oscar Romero Catholic High School in Edmonton, Canada, formerly known as Archbishop Oscar Romero, and as Blessed Oscar Romero throughout his canonization.
- St Oscar Romero Catholic School, a coeducational secondary school in Worthing, West Sussex, England.
- Romero Center Ministries in Camden, New Jersey, U.S., provides Catholic education and retreat experiences inspired by Archbishop Óscar Romero's prophetic witness. The mission of Romero Center Ministries is to "seek personal, communal, and societal transformation by living ministry as proclaimed in Christ's Gospel." The center hosts over 1,600 guests annually from high schools, colleges, and youth groups which participate in the Urban Challenge program.
- The University of Scranton in Scranton, Pennsylvania, renamed a plaza of four residence halls after him in 2018, the group of buildings is now known as Romero Plaza.
- The University of Texas at El Paso's Catholic Newman Center named its Ministry Center after the Bishop in 2019.
- St. Oscar Romero Parish in Canton, Massachusetts, United States, was established in 2021 when the former St. John the Evangelist and St. Gerard Majella churches were merged and renamed in his honor, becoming the first parish in the Archdiocese of Boston dedicated to Óscar Romero.
- The University of Edinburgh named student accommodation after the Archbishop, and unveiled a memorial plaque, in 1991.
- Óscar Romero college in Dendermonde, Belgium, is a fusion of multiple Catholic schools that took on the name of the Archbishop in 2014.

=== Television and film ===
- The opening scene in the otherwise fictional spy film S.A.S. à San Salvador (1983) shows a car carrying thugs through San Salvador and stopping at a church inside which the main villain assassinates Óscar Romero.
- Oliver Stone's 1986 film Salvador depicts a fictionalized version of the assassination of Romero (played by José Carlos Ruiz) in a pivotal scene. Romero's assassination (with René Enríquez as Romero) was also featured in the 1983 television film Choices of the Heart about the life and death of American Catholic missionary Jean Donovan.
- The Archbishop's life is the basis of the 1989 film Romero, directed by John Duigan and starring Raul Julia as Romero. It was produced by Paulist Productions (a film company run by the Paulist Fathers, a Roman Catholic society of priests). Timed for release ten years after Romero's death, it was the first Hollywood feature film ever to be financed by the order. The film received respectful, if less-than-enthusiastic, reviews. Roger Ebert typified the critics who acknowledged that "The film has a good heart, and the Julia performance is an interesting one, restrained and considered. ... The film's weakness is a certain implacable predictability."
- In 2005, while at the UC Berkeley Graduate School of Journalism, Daniel Freed, an independent documentary filmmaker and frequent contributor to PBS and CNBC, made a 30-minute film entitled The Murder of Monseñor which not only documented Romero's assassination but also told the story of how Álvaro Rafael Saravia – whom a U.S. District court found, in 2004, had personally organized the assassination – moved to the United States and lived for 25 years as a used car salesman in Modesto, California, until he became aware of the pending legal action against him in 2003 and disappeared, leaving behind his drivers license and social security card, as well as his credit cards and his dog. In 2016 a 1993 law protecting the actions of the military during the Civil War was overruled by a Salvadoran high court and on 23 October 2018, another court ordered the arrest of Saravia.
- The Daily Show episode on 17 March 2010 showed clips from the Texas State Board of Education in which "a panel of experts" recommended including Romero in the state's history books, but an amendment proposed by Patricia Hardy to exclude Romero was passed on 10 March 2010. The clip of Ms. Hardy shows her arguing against including Romero because "I guarantee you most of you did not know who Oscar Romero was. ... I just happen to think it's not [important]."
- A film about the Archbishop, Monseñor, the Last Journey of Óscar Romero, with the priest Robert Pelton serving as executive producer, had its United States premiere in 2010. This film won the Latin American Studies Association (LASA) Award for Merit in film, in competition with 25 other films. Pelton was invited to show the film throughout Cuba. It was sponsored by ecclesial and human rights groups from Latin America and from North America. Alma Guillermoprieto in The New York Review of Books describes the film as a "hagiography", and as "an astonishing compilation of footage" of the final three years of his life.

=== Visual arts ===
- St. James the Greater Catholic Church in Charles Town, West Virginia, is the first known Catholic Church in the United States to venerate St. Oscar Romero with a stained glass window in its building. The project was led by the first Spanish priest of the Wheeling-Charleston Diocese, José Escalante, who is originally from El Salvador, as a gift to the Spanish community of the parish.
- John Roberts sculpted a statue of Óscar Romero that fills a prominent niche on the western facade of Westminster Abbey in London; it was unveiled in the presence of Queen Elizabeth II in 1998.
- Joan Walsh-Smith sculpted a statue of Saint Óscar Romero at The Holy Cross College Ellenbrook Western Australia in 2017. The sculpture depicts their College Patron "walking his faith" on his journey with the poor in El Salvador.
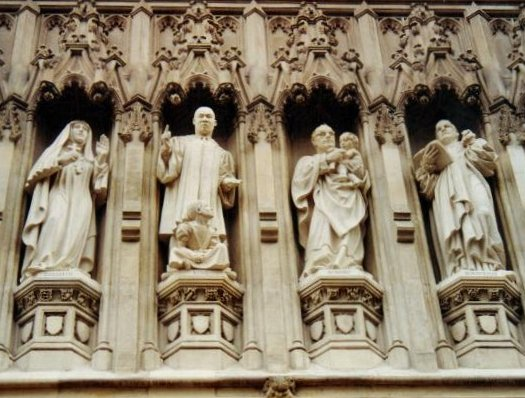
From the Gallery of 20th-century martyrs at Westminster Abbey – Mother Elizabeth of Russia, Rev. Martin Luther King Jr., Archbishop Óscar Romero and Pastor Dietrich Bonhoeffer

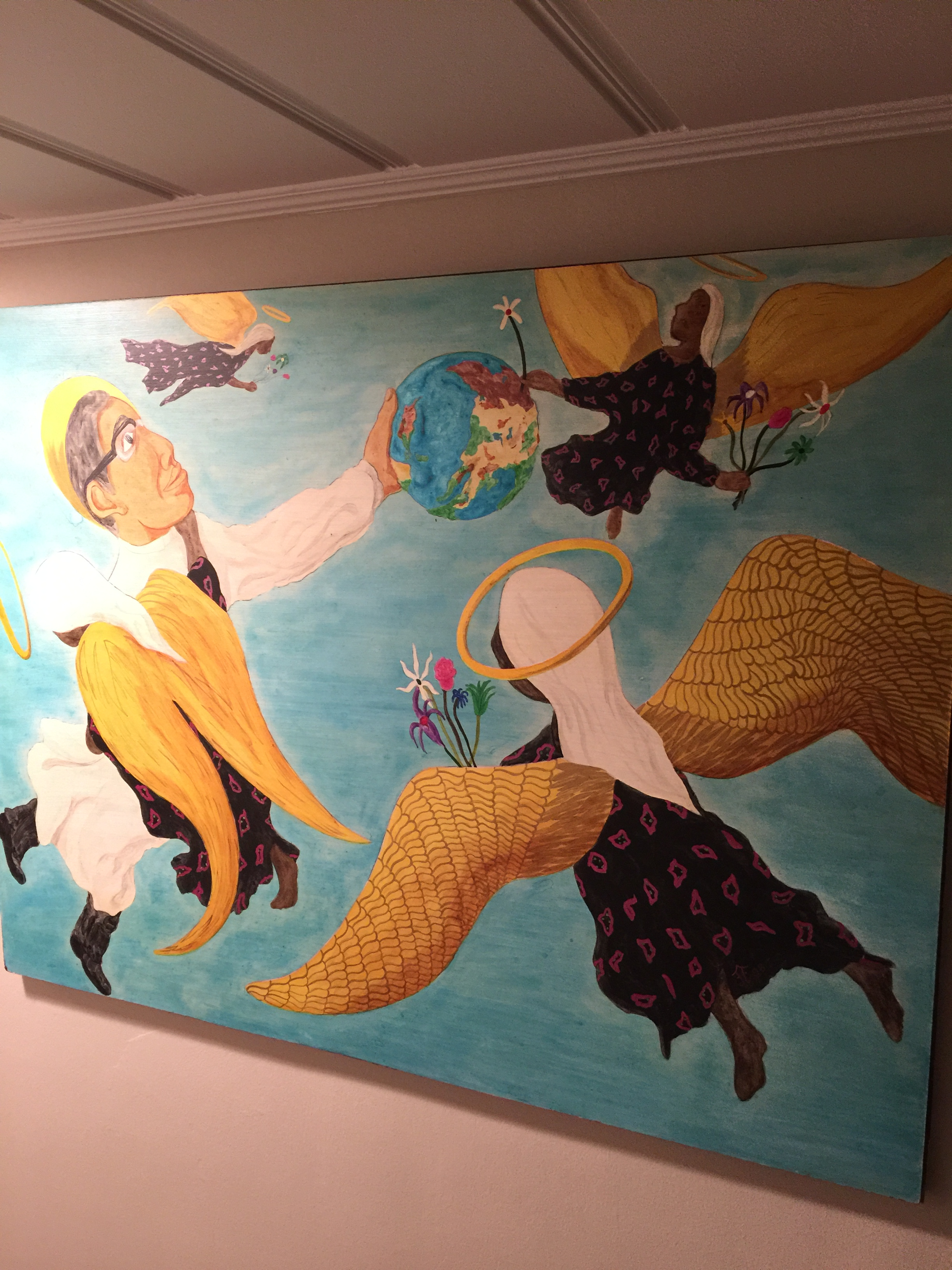
Frank Diaz Escalet, 1998, Oscar Romero, Un Regalo De Dios Para El Mundo Entero; acrylic on Masonite. This painting is in a private collection in Sacramento, California.

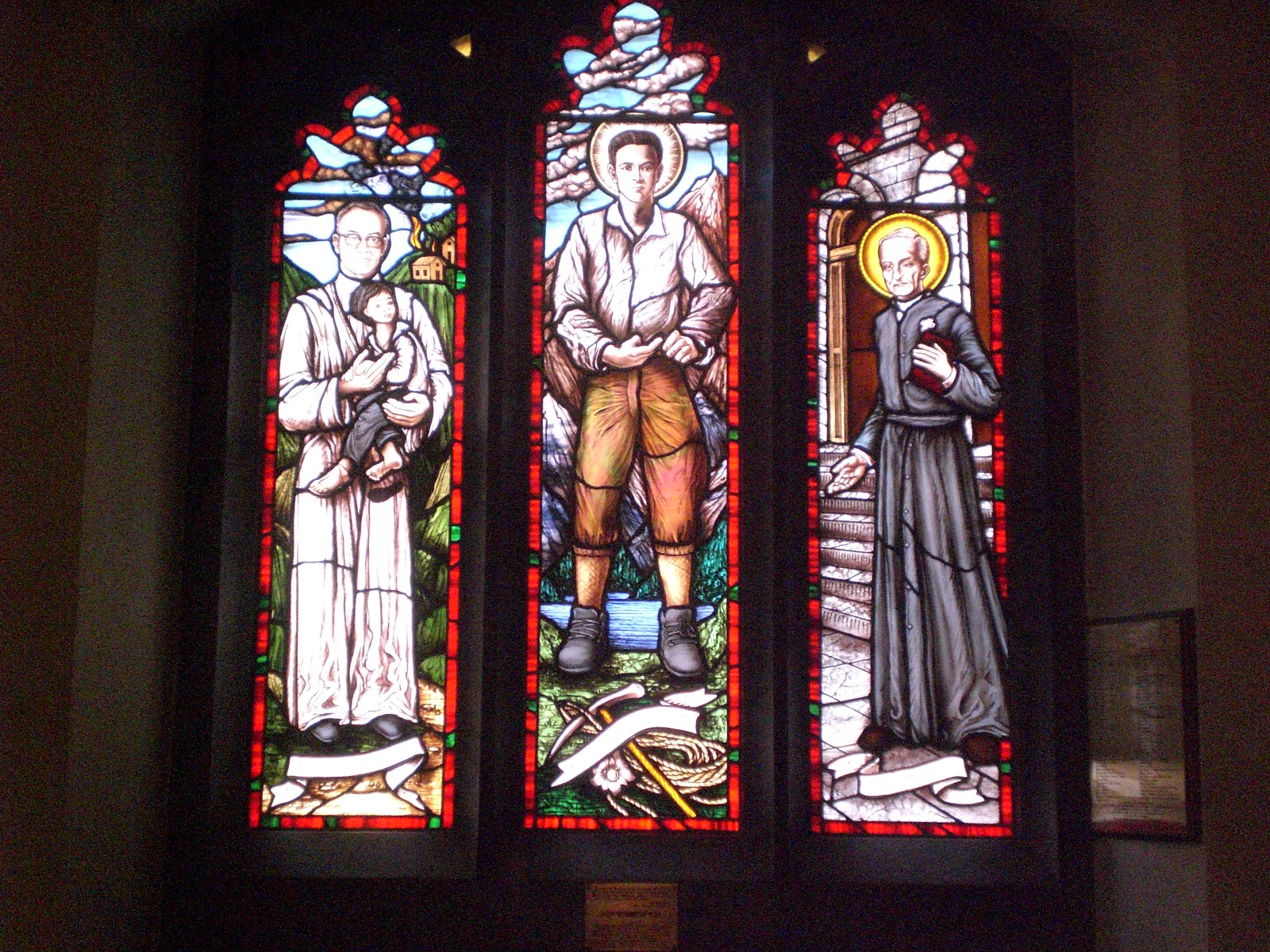
St. Thomas Aquinas Church stained glass windows of Óscar Romero, Pier Giorgio Frassati and André Bessette, Toronto, Canada

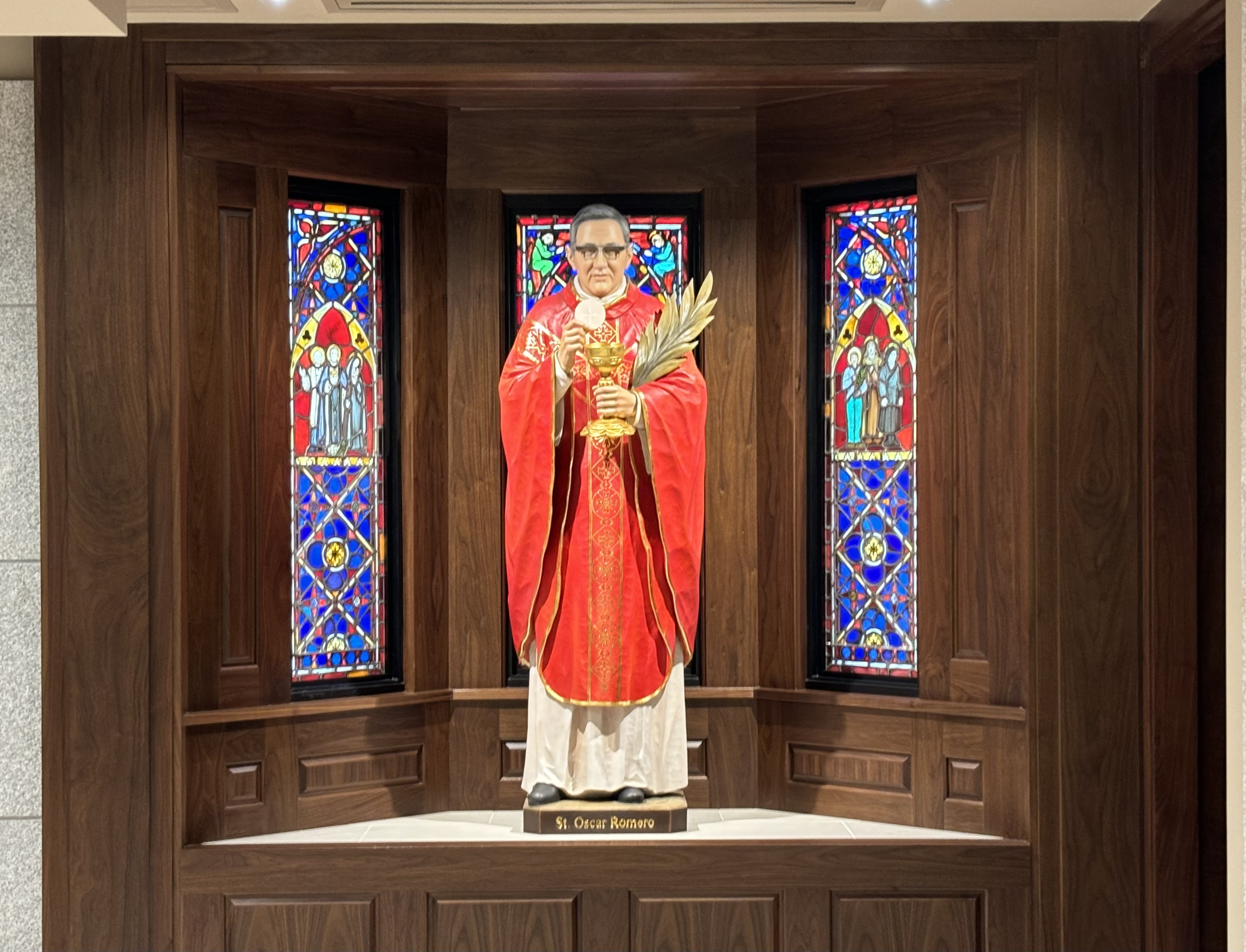
St. Oscar Romero statue in the Cathedral of Saint Thomas More in Arlington, Virginia

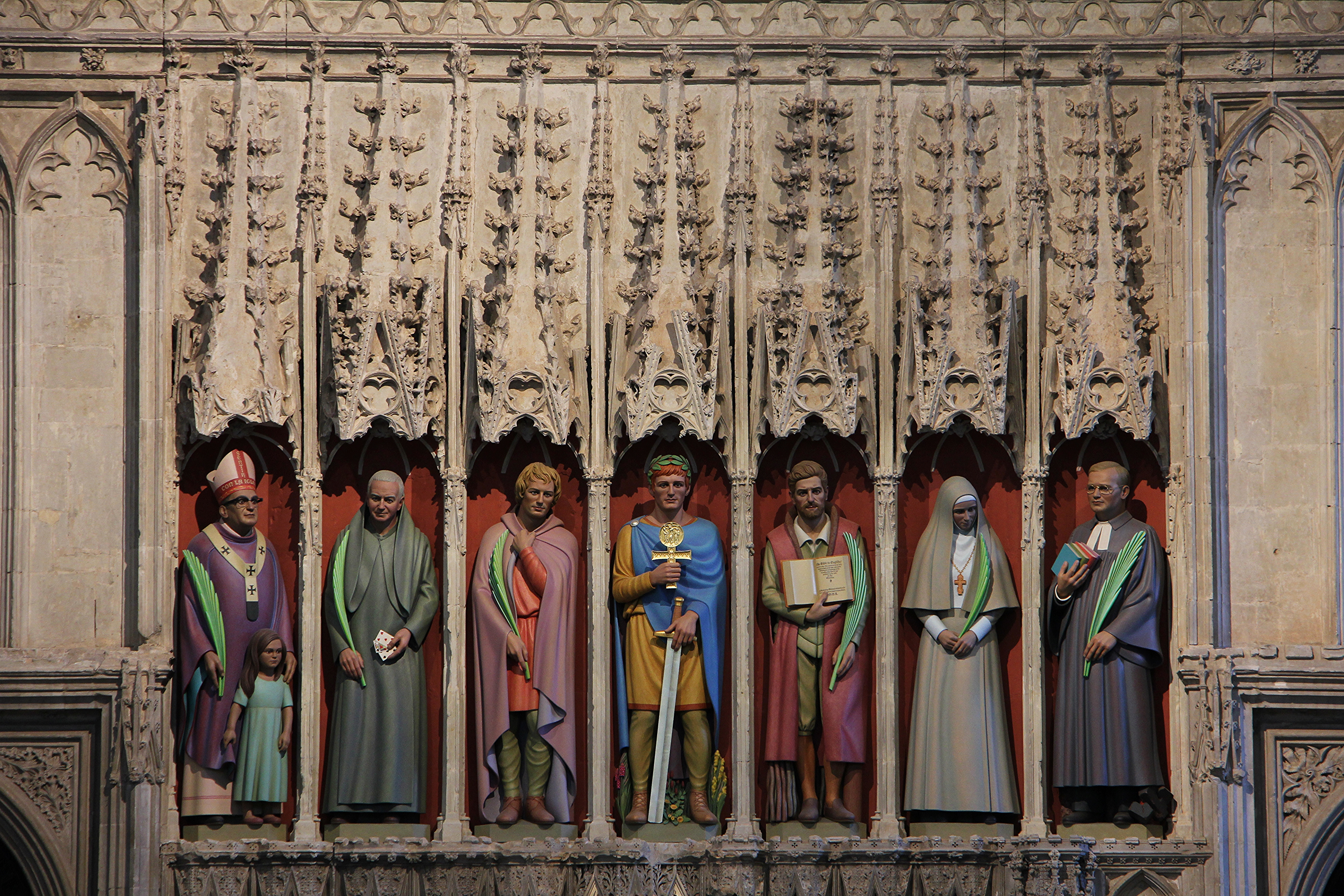
St. Oscar Romero, Saint Alban Roe, Saint Amphibalus, Saint Alban, Saint George Tankerfield, Mother Elizabeth of Russia, Dietrich Bonhoeffer, depicted in the nave reredos St Albans Cathedral

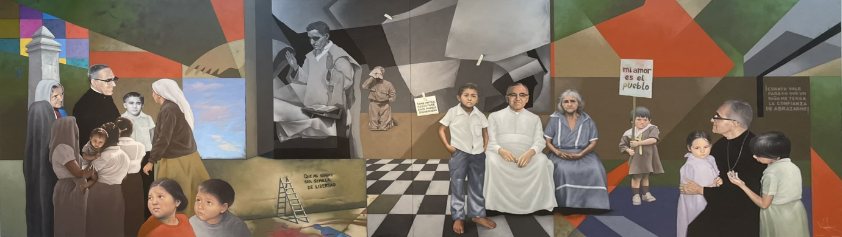
Mural Tribute to Monsignor Óscar Arnulfo Romero, located at the San Óscar Arnulfo Romero y Galdámez International Airport in El Salvador.

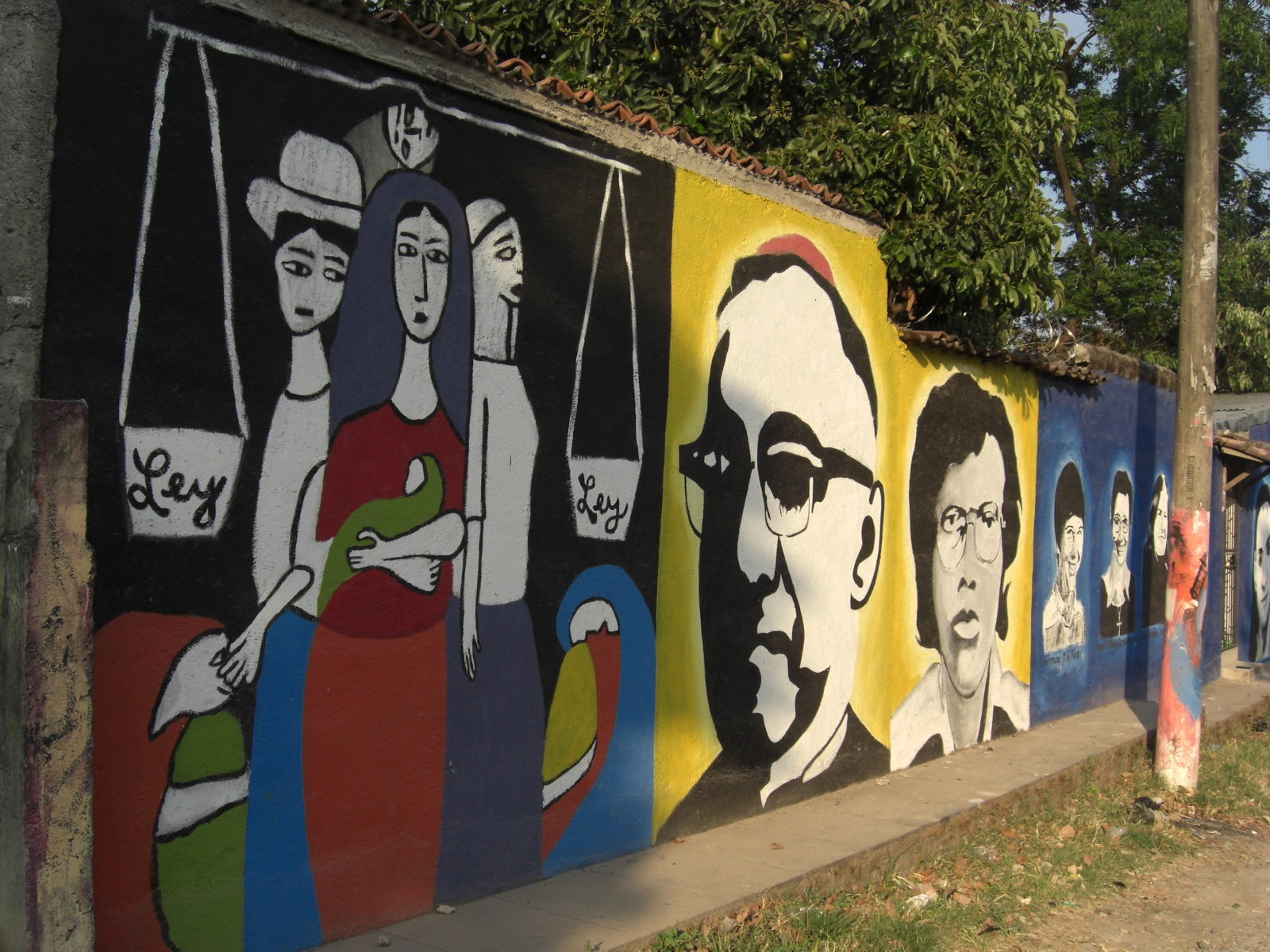
Memorial depicting Oscar Romero and the 1980 murders of U.S. missionaries in El Salvador

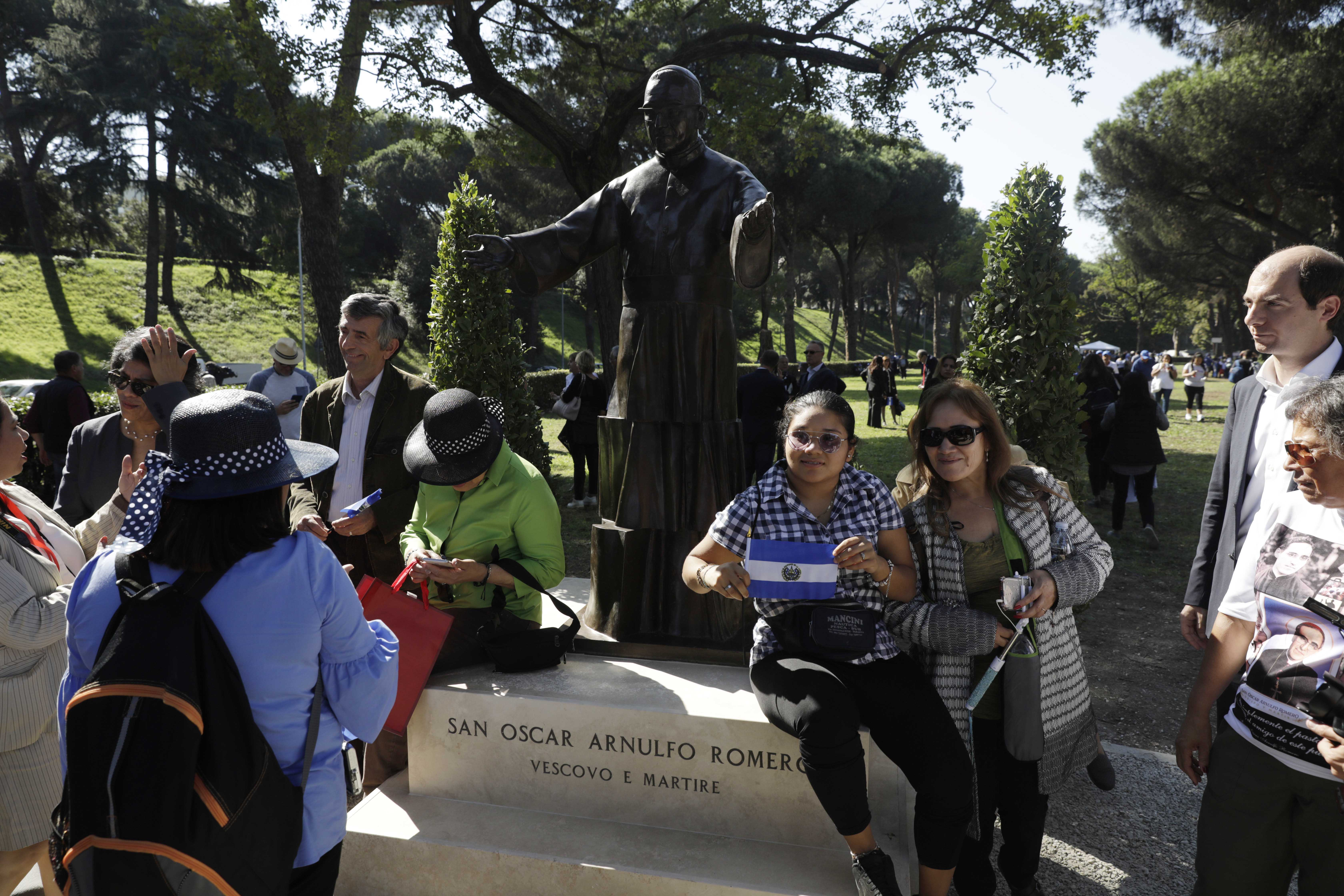
Unveiling of Monsignor Romero's sculpture in Italy

=== Music ===
- Violinist Jean-Luc Ponty's album Individual Choice has a song dedicated to Oscar Romero: "Eulogy to Oscar Romero".
- Panamanian musician Rubén Blades dedicated a song to him named "El Padre Antonio y el Monaguillo Andrés".
- Welsh folk singer Dafydd Iwan released the song "Oscar Romero" in his memory on his 1991 album Dal i Gredu.

=== Political writing ===
- In their book Manufacturing Consent (1988), Noam Chomsky and Edward S. Herman compared U.S. media coverage of the murders of Romero and other Latin American clergy in U.S. client states with coverage of the murder of Catholic priest Jerzy Popiełuszko in "enemy" Communist Poland to explain their propaganda model hypothesis.

== See also ==
- List of peace activists
- List of unsolved murders (1980–1999)
- Misa Campesina Nicaragüense
- Stanley Rother
- Salvadoran Civil War

Catholic priests assassinated in El Salvador during and after Óscar Romero's time as archbishop (1977–1980):

- Rutilio Grande: assassinated 12 March 1977
- Alfonso Navarro: assassinated 11 May 1977
- Ernesto Barrera: assassinated 28 November 1978
- Octavio Ortiz: assassinated 20 January 1979
- Rafael Palacios: assassinated 20 June 1979
- Napoleón Macías: assassinated 4 August 1979
- Ignacio Martín-Baró: assassinated 16 November 1989
- Segundo Montes: assassinated 16 November 1989
- Ignacio Ellacuría: assassinated 16 November 1989

Murder of U.S. missionaries in El Salvador on 2 December 1980: three Religious Sisters and one lay worker:

- Maura Clarke, Maryknoll
- Jean Donovan, lay missionary
- Ita Ford, Maryknoll
- Dorothy Kazel, Ursuline nun

Catholic Church titles
Preceded by Francisco R. Cruces	— TITULAR — Bishop of Tambeae; 5 April 1970 – 15 October 1974	Succeeded by A. S. Bernardino
Preceded by Francisco Ramírez	Bishop of Santiago de María; 15 October 1974 – 3 February 1977	Succeeded by Arturo Rivera
Preceded by Luis Chávez	Archbishop of San Salvador; 3 February 1977 – 24 March 1980	Succeeded by Arturo Rivera
