= Ernesto Barrera =

Salvadoran priest (died 1978)

Ernesto Barrera (died 28 November 1978) was a Roman Catholic priest from El Salvador. He served several communities in the department of San Salvador, under Archbishop Óscar Romero.

Barrera was killed in a shoot-out with the National Guard on 28 November 1978. Afterward, the government claimed that he had been a member of the guerrilla group Fuerzas Populares de Liberación (FPL). Archbishop Romero questioned the truth of this assertion, but later received a letter from the FPL leadership confirming that Barrera had indeed been a member.
