= Edward Brocket =

16th-century English politician

Edward Brocket (1490/91–1558/69), of Broadfield and Letchworth, Hertfordshire, was an English politician.

He was a member (MP) of the Parliament of England for Hertfordshire in 1542? and November 1554. In his role as Sheriff of Hertfordshire, Brocket and his Under-Sheriff, Pulter of Hitchin, bought the Protestant heretic George Tankerfield from Newgate Prison to St Albans for his execution in August 1555.
