= Alfonso Navarro =

Alfonso Navarro Oviedo was a Roman Catholic priest in El Salvador who was shot on May 11, 1977, on the outskirts of San Salvador. He served under Archbishop Óscar Arnulfo Romero y Galdámez.
