= Ciudad Barrios =

- District
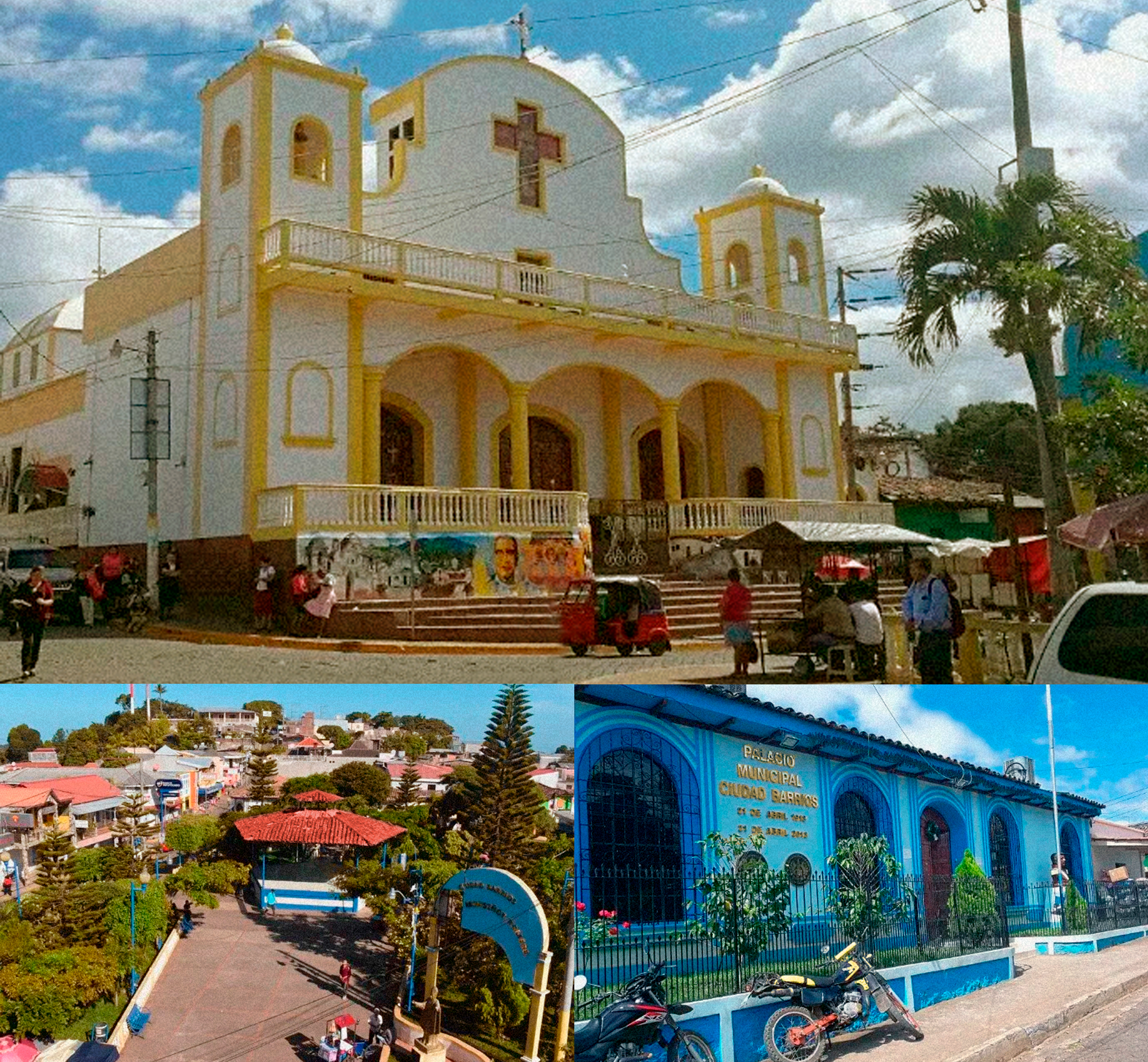

- Location in El Salvador Ciudad Barrios (Central America)
- Coordinates: 13°46′N 88°16′W
- Country: El Salvador
- Department: San Miguel Department

Area
  - Total: 26 sq mi (68 km^{2})
- Elevation: 2,972 ft (906 m)

Population (2024)
  - Total: 23,256
  - Seat/Town: 10,234

Ciudad Barrios is a district in the San Miguel department of El Salvador. Ciudad Barrios is one of the most cultural places in El Salvador, has many attractions and is the birthplace of Archbishop Óscar Romero, the first saint of El Salvador.

== See also ==
- Ciudad Barrios prison
