= Ciudad Barrios prison =

Prison in San Miguel, El Salvador

Coordinates: 13.7538°N 88.2739°W

The Ciudad Barrios prison is a prison in Ciudad Barrios, San Miguel, El Salvador. Between September 2004 and mid-2015, it exclusively housed members of the MS-13 gang. During this time, El Salvador had a policy of segregating gang members in its prisons; this policy has been reversed. The Ciudad Barrios prison has been militarized, with both soldiers and police officers serving as prison guards. As of 2012, the prison housed nearly 2,500 prisoners, despite a capacity of 800. Guards have relatively little control over the prison given a prisoner-to-guard ratio of 50 to one. It is one of the most violent prisons in the country.
