= Napoleón Macías =

Alirio Napoleón Macías was a Roman Catholic priest in El Salvador who was assassinated on 4 August 1979. He served under Archbishop Óscar Arnulfo Romero y Galdámez. His murder was characterized by Romero as part of a systematic persecution of the Catholic Church and oppression against efforts to reform a military dictatorship there to guarantee human rights for the poor masses.
