= George Tankerfield =

English Protestant martyr

2015 Statue of George Tankerfield at St Albans Cathedral

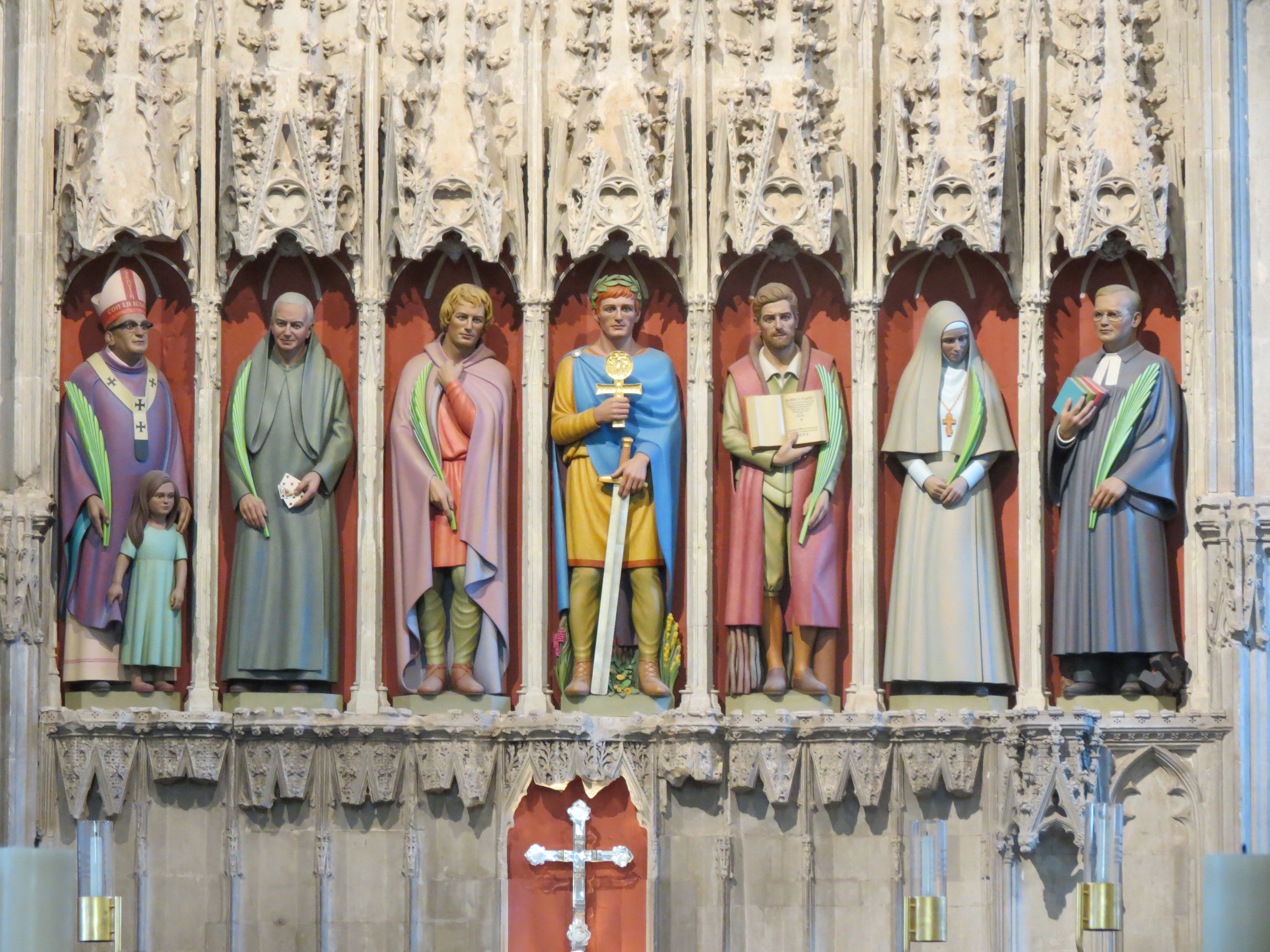
Tankerfield (third from right) with other martyrs at St Albans Cathedral

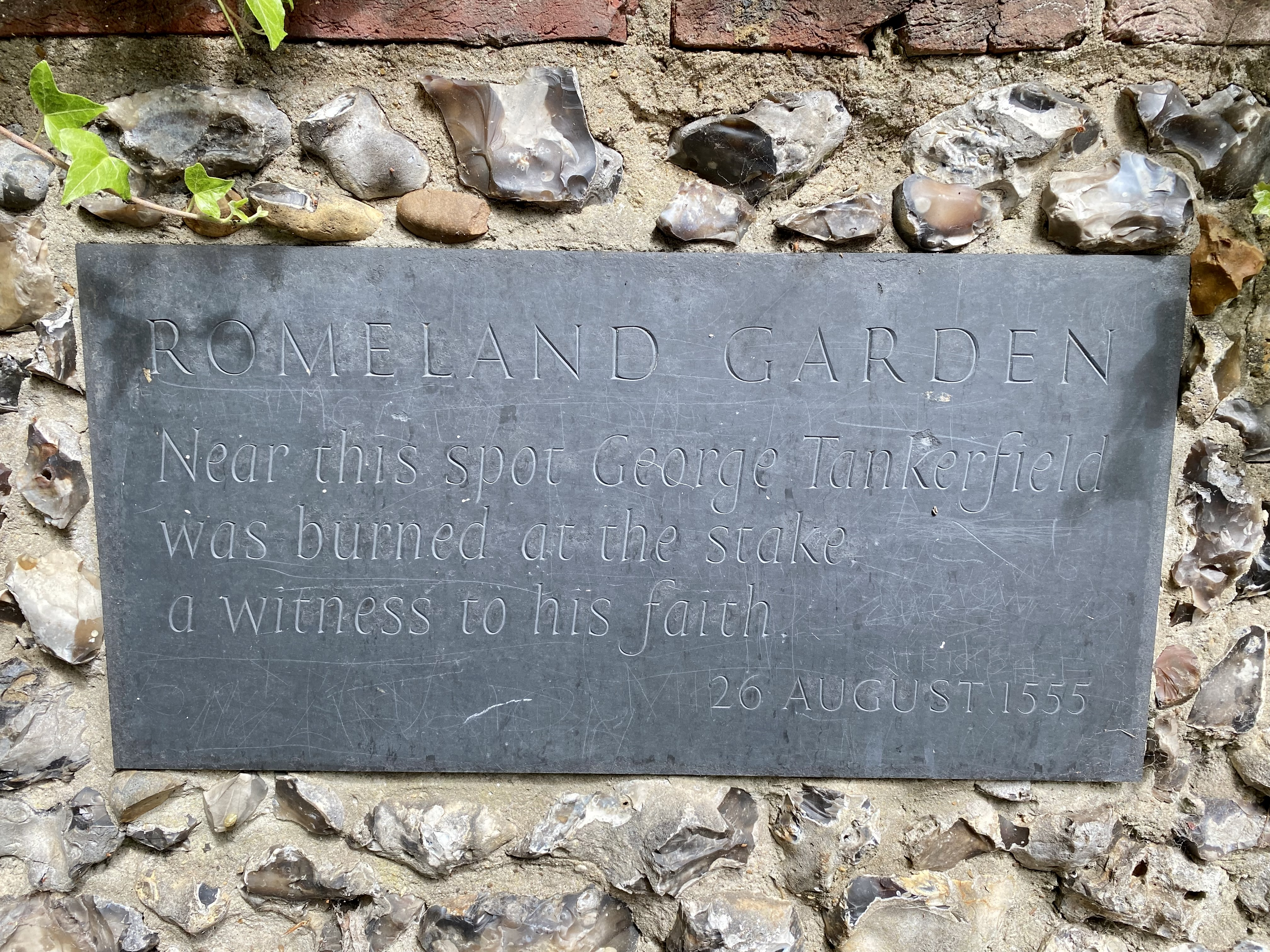
Plaque to Tankerfield in St Albans's Romeland Gardens

George Tankerfield (born c.1528 - died 26 August 1555) was an English Protestant martyr who was burned at the stake in St Albans during the persecution of Protestants under Queen Mary I.

== Biography ==
Tankerfield's biography was related by John Foxe in his Foxe's Book of Martyrs. According to Foxe Tankerfield was born in York and worked as a cook in St Albans, having came from London. Tankerfield was a 'papist' during the reign of Edward VI until the age of 28 when he became appalled by the persecutions of Protestants under Mary I. Tankerfield had been ill in bed at home in St Albans for several days before rising and going to watch an archery tournament in the nearby Temple Gardens. The Yeoman of the Guard, Beard, came to Tankerfield's house and was greeted by his wife. Beard told her that Tankerfield had been summoned to cook a banquet for Lord Paget, and she hurried to fetch him. Tankerfield was dismayed to hear of Beard's presence and when he came home his wife attacked Beard with a skewer, and he was rescued by the constable. Tankerfield's wife then threw a brick at Beard, hitting him. Tankerfield was bought to Newgate Prison on the last day of February 1555, by Beard and the pewterer Simon Ponder who served as constable of St. Dunstan's in the West. He was sent in for questioning by Bishop Bonner by Sir Roger Chomley and a Dr. Martin. Tankerfield was presented to Bonner as part of a group of 10 prisoners of eight men and two women. Tankerfield and a Robert Smith of Windsor were the most talkative of the group. Foxe recalled Bonner as saying "This [Tankerfield] is master speaker, and this [Smith] master comptroller" and subsequently "By my troth, master speaker, ye shall preach at a stake".

Bonner questioned Tankerfield on the necessity of auricular confession, the real presence of Christ in the Eucharist and the sufficiency of the mass in the Catholic Church. Antiquarian Edgar Wigram, writing in the Transactions of the St Albans Architectural and Archaeological Society in 1926 felt that neither Tankerfield nor Bonner were "at all desirous of finding any terms of agreement. Each was intent on securing a dialectic triumph for its own shibboleth".

=== Execution in St Albans ===
All the prisoners were condemned to death. Three died in prison at the Lollards' Tower at Lambeth Palace prior to the date of their execution. The other seven prisoners were "distributed about the country so as to inspire public terror" according to Wigram. Tankerfield was bought back to St Albans on 26 August by the Sheriff of Hertfordshire Edward Brocket and his Under-Sheriff, Pulter of Hitchin. Brocket and Pulter left Tankerfield at the Cross Keys inn. Foxe relates that there was a "great concourse of people to see and hear the prisoner: among the which multitude some were sorry to see so godly a man brought to be burned". A school master to Sir Thomas Pope came to the Cross Keys and had a long argument with Tankerfield which did not convince him. Tankerfield then took "a pint of Malmsey and a loaf" as sacramental bread and wine stating that "he did not thus to derogate authority from any man, nor in contempt of those who were God's ministers; but because he could not have the Sacrament ministered to him according to God's Word". His friends urged him to eat some meat but he said that he should not have it as others had more need of it and he had only a short time to live. Tankerfield then called for a fire to be lit and put his foot in the fire "to test his own endurance and resolution". Tankerfield flinched from the fire and told onlookers that his flesh was weak but he "trusted that the Spirit would sustain him". At 2pm the sheriffs arrived to take him to be burned at the stake. The stake had been constructed in Romeland, an area to the west of the cathedral. Tankerfield knelt before the stake to pray and said that he would "have a sharp dinner ...but I hope a joyful supper in Heaven". As the faggots were placed around the stake a priest approached Tankerfield to persuade him of the sacraments. Tankerfield told him "I defy the whore of Babylon; I defy the whore of Babylon: fie on that abominable idol. Good people, do not believe him; good people, do not believe him". Tankerfield died quickly as the flames consumed him, crying out the name of Jesus. Wigram wrote that "Surely, even if nothing in his life became him better than the leaving of it, we may confess that here was a man whose memory deserves our esteem".

== Legacy ==
An 18th-century print depicting Tankerfield in prison at Newgate conversing with Robert Smith and other prisoners is in the collection of the British Museum. The print was produced by Thomas Bowles II and may have illustrated an edition of Foxe's Book of Martyrs. In 2015 a polychrome statue of Tankerfield by Rory Young was added to a medieval nave screen at St Albans Cathedral along with statues of six other martyrs to mark the cathedral's 900th anniversary. Tankerfield gives his name to Tankerfield Place, an apartment development built in the late 1970s. A stone in Romeland Gardens marks the place where he was executed. A tablet marking his execution is located at Romeland Gardens. The present plaque dates from 1955 having replaced an earlier plaque of 1925.
