= Octavio Ortiz =

Octavio Ortiz Luna (March 22, 1944 – January 20, 1979) was a Roman Catholic priest in El Salvador who was assassinated on January 20, 1979. He served under Archbishop Óscar Arnulfo Romero y Galdámez. His murder was characterized by Romero as part of a systematic persecution of the Catholic Church and oppression against efforts to reform a military dictatorship there to guarantee human rights for the poor masses.

== Biography ==
Octavio Ortiz Luna was born on March 22, 1944, in a town called Agua Blanca in the Municipality of Cacaopera, in the northeastern Salvadoran province of Morazán. Ortiz was born to peasant parents, Alejandro Ortiz and Exaltación de la Cruz Luna. The Ortiz-Lunas lost four other children, in addition to Octavio, to the bloodshed of the Salvadoran Civil War.

Ortiz prepared for the priesthood at the San Salvador's Seminario San José de la Montaña. He was ordained a priest by Msgr. Romero. Fr. Ortiz was Romero's first priestly ordination. Thereafter, Fr. Ortiz was sent to minister to the parish of El Despertar in the San Salvador neighborhood of Mejicanos.

Ortiz took a special interest in young workers, whom he offered spiritual retreats and seminars. Apparently, Ortiz had been leading such a retreat the night before his assassination. At dawn on January 20, 1979, government troops burst into the retreat center, killed Ortiz and four youths, and arrested the rest. The government would claim that the retreat center was a guerrilla base. Archbishop Romero called the allegations "lies." It is suspected that the government placed the bodies in positions that would support the official version of events. The bodies were placed on top the house roof and with gun machines. The assassination has never been investigated. In a final insult, Ortiz's head was repeatedly run over by a military vehicle so that the priest could not have an open casket funeral. Romero would later say that Ortiz "gave his face to Jesus."
