= Rafael Palacios (priest) =

Rafael Palacios was a Roman Catholic priest in El Salvador who was assassinated on 20 June 1979 in Suchitoto. He served under Archbishop Óscar Romero. His murder was characterized by Romero as part of a systematic persecution of the Catholic Church and oppression against efforts to reform a military dictatorship there to guarantee human rights for the poor masses.
