= Christian Initiative Romero =

Germany-based voluntary association

Christliche Initiative Romero
- Stimmt für Gerechtigkeit (English: Vote for Justice)
- Founded: 1981
- Location(s): Schillerstraße 44a 48155 Münster Germany
- Region served: El Salvador, Nicaragua, Guatemala, Honduras
- Services: Development cooperation, campaigns, education and awareness raising, human rights, international understanding
- Website: www.ci-romero.de/start-en/

The Christian Initiative Romero e.V. (CIR), founded in 1981, is a registered association based in Münster, Germany.

The organization is named after Archbishop Óscar Romero. It focuses on development cooperation with a particular focus on labor and human rights in Central American countries, as well as campaigning and educational work in Germany.

== History ==
The Christian Initiative Romero e.V. (CIR) emerged in the late 1970s, inspired by the values and perspectives of Latin American grassroots communities and social movements. Many of these organizations considered themselves part of the liberation theology movement, which demanded the direct involvement of all Christians in overcoming social injustices.

In Münster, solidarity committees were formed in support of the liberation movements in Central America. These committees organized public actions to draw attention to military governments' repression of dissidents. In 1980, members of these committees occupied Cologne Cathedral to urge church leaders to take a stand for the persecuted. Shortly afterward, the "Christian Initiative El Salvador" was founded in Münster, later renamed "Christian Initiative Romero e.V." (CIR) in 1984. Since 2022, the organization has been publicly known primarily as the "Romero Initiative" (CIR). The name honors Archbishop Óscar Romero, who fought against human rights violations until his assassination in 1980. Since its founding, CIR has been non-partisan and not affiliated with any denomination.

== Structure ==
The Christian Initiative Romero e.V. (CIR) is an independent association, founded in 1981, which pursues non-profit goals and does not engage in self-serving economic activities. The association is governed by a volunteer board, elected by the general assembly, which serves as the organization's highest decision-making body.

CIR employs over 35 full-time staff members.

== Funding ==
The Christian Initiative Romero e.V. (CIR) is funded through membership fees, donations, and government support, including funding from the German Federal Ministry for Economic Cooperation and Development and the EU, as well as grants from churches and private foundations, and funds from the Romero Foundation. The association holds the donation seal of the German Central Institute for Social Issues.

The Romero Foundation contributes to CIR’s work through interest earnings, which, according to its statutes, are exclusively available for CIR’s project and campaign work.

CIR publishes annual and financial reports about its funding and expenditures.

== Activities ==
The work of Christian Initiative Romero e.V. (CIR) is divided into two key areas: collaboration with partner organizations in Central America and campaigning and educational work in Germany and Europe.

=== Central America ===
CIR has maintained long-standing partnerships with organizations in Central America, particularly in Nicaragua, El Salvador, Guatemala, and Honduras.

These organizations focus on women’s empowerment, cultural and social rights of Indigenous communities, dignified working conditions, agroecology and sustainable agriculture, climate justice, and strengthening civil society.

An increasingly important focus is the protection of democratic institutions, including freedom of expression and the safety of civil society actors.

CIR provides funding and logistical support to its partner organizations to ensure their ability to operate, even in challenging political contexts.

Additionally, CIR provides emergency aid, organizes urgent actions for cases of human and labor rights violations, facilitates informational events in Germany and Europe, such as speaker tours involving representatives from Central America.

=== Germany and Europe ===
The second core area of CIR’s work is political education and campaigning in Germany and Europe with a focus on human rights and ethical consumption.

CIR conducts research on human rights in Central America, working conditions in the garment and toy industries, climate change adaptation, and supply chains of food products such as palm oil, soy, and orange juice. The results are published in studies, brochures, posters, magazines, and videos. CIR also distributes a free quarterly magazine, "presente", reaching approximately 17,500 readers.

== Campaigns ==
CIR is involved in numerous campaigns working towards the following topics:

Supermarket market power (SupplyCha!nge)

Human rights and environmental protection in resource extraction (Stop Mad Mining)

Climate justice (Game On!)

System change ("The WE in Economy – Shaping Transformation Together")

Food system transformation (Our Food. Our Future; Rebooting the Food System

Sustainable procurement (due diligence obligations in the public procurement of food and textiles in municipalities and at NRW state level)

The fast fashion system

Effective supply chain laws at national and European level.

The goal of CIR’s campaigning is to raise awareness about the impact of economic and consumption patterns on people and the environment in the Global South and to push for political changes that protect human and environmental rights.

== Memberships ==
CIR is a member of several organizations and alliances:

- Arbeitskreis Rohstoffe
- Buy Better Food
- CorA-Netzwerk Netzwerk Unternehmensverantwortung ”Corporate Accountability”
- Die Initiative Lieferkettengesetz
- Ernährungsrat Münster
- Fairtrade Deutschland
- Fairtrade Town Münster
- Fair Toys Organisation
- Kampagne für Saubere Kleidung
- Klima-Allianz Deutschland
- Meine Landwirtschaft
- Nürnberger Bündnis Fair Toys
- Pro los Niños y Adolescentes Trabajadores – ProNATs
- Runder Tisch Zentralamerika
- Verband Entwicklungspolitik und Humanitäre Hilfe deutscher Nichtregierungsorganisationen (VENRO)
