= Líšnice =

Líšnice may refer to places in the Czech Republic:

- Líšnice (Prague-West District), a municipality and village in the Central Bohemian Region
- Líšnice (Šumperk District), a municipality and village in the Olomouc Region
- Líšnice (Ústí nad Orlicí District), a municipality and village in the Pardubice Region

== See also ==
- Lišnice, a municipality and village in the Ústí nad Labem Region, Czech Republic
