= Drahelčice =

- Municipality
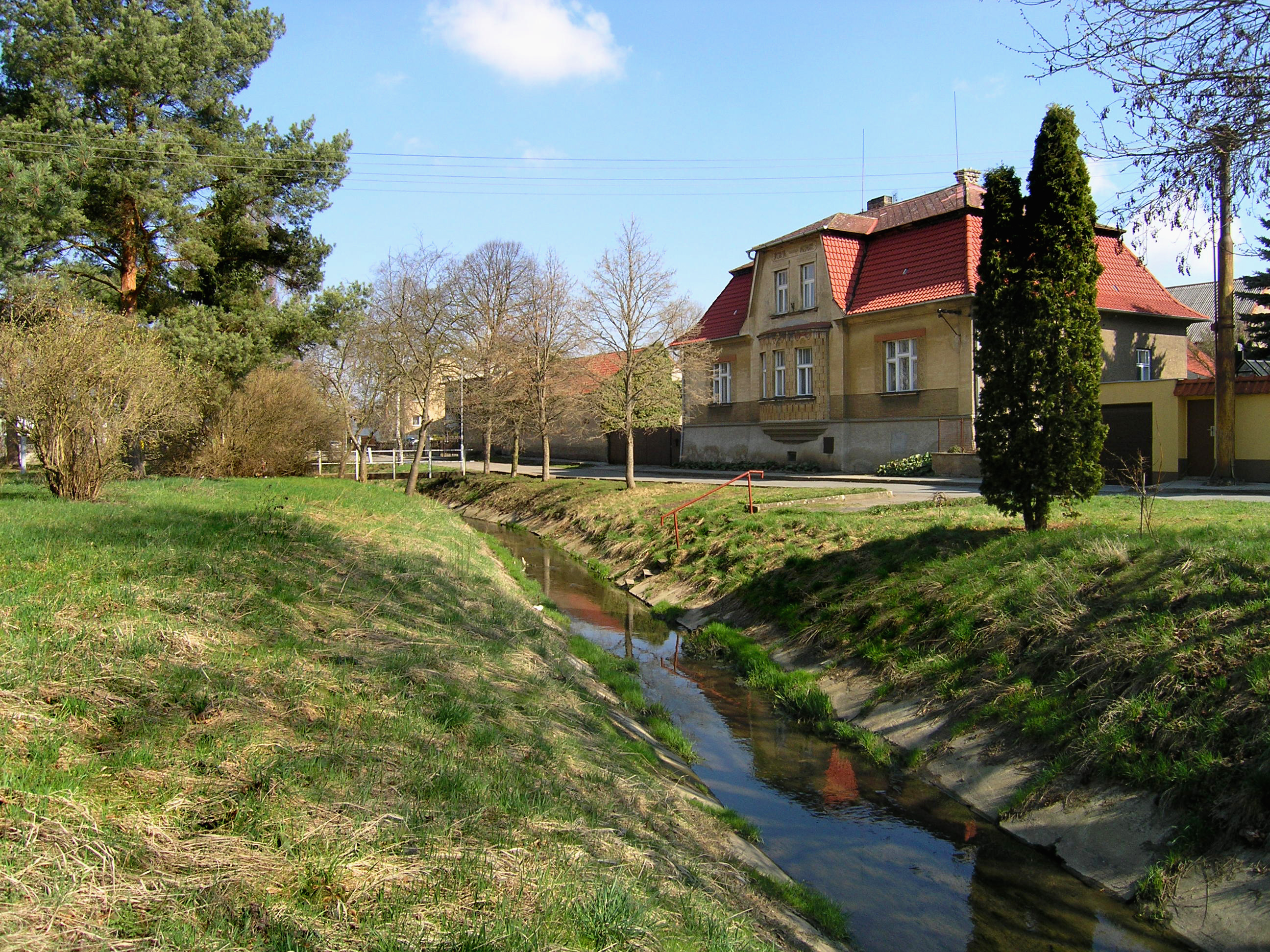
- The brook Radotínský potok in Drahelčice

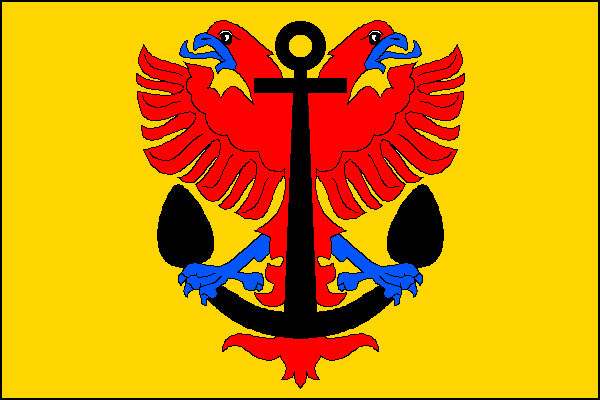
- Flag Coat of arms

- Location in the Czech Republic
- Coordinates: 50°1′55″N 14°12′11″E
- Country: Czech Republic
- Region: Central Bohemian
- District: Prague-West
- First mentioned: 1115

Area
  - Total: 4.77 km^{2} (1.84 sq mi)
- Elevation: 367 m (1,204 ft)

Population (2026-01-01)
  - Total: 1,667
  - Density: 349/km^{2} (905/sq mi)
- Time zone: UTC+1 (CET)
  - Summer (DST): UTC+2 (CEST)
- Postal code: 252 45
- Website: www.drahelcice-obec.cz

Drahelčice is a municipality and village in Prague-West District in the Central Bohemian Region of the Czech Republic. It has about 1,700 inhabitants.

== History ==
The first written mention is from 1115.

== Demographics ==
Historical population
Year	Pop.	±%
1869	339	—
1880	330	−2.7%
1890	403	+22.1%
1900	495	+22.8%
1910	548	+10.7%
1921	492	−10.2%
1930	496	+0.8%
1950	492	−0.8%
1961	457	−7.1%
1970	449	−1.8%
1980	414	−7.8%
1991	370	−10.6%
2001	402	+8.6%
2011	559	+39.1%
2021	1,454	+160.1%
Source: Censuses
