= Chýnice =

- Municipality
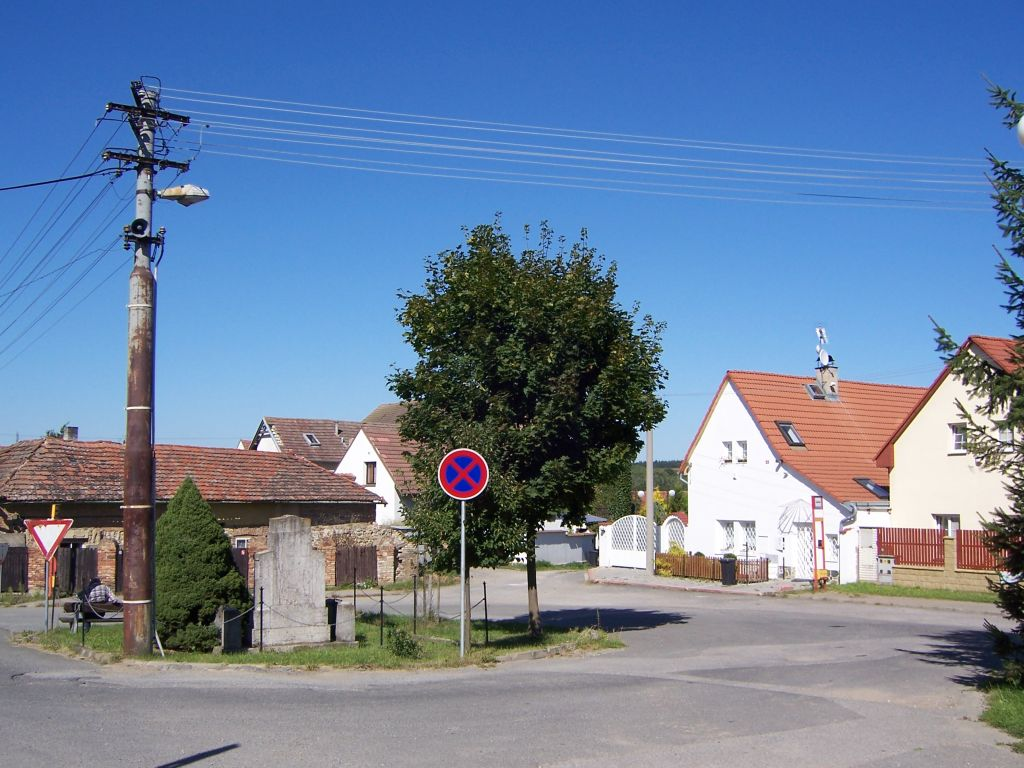
- Centre of Chýnice

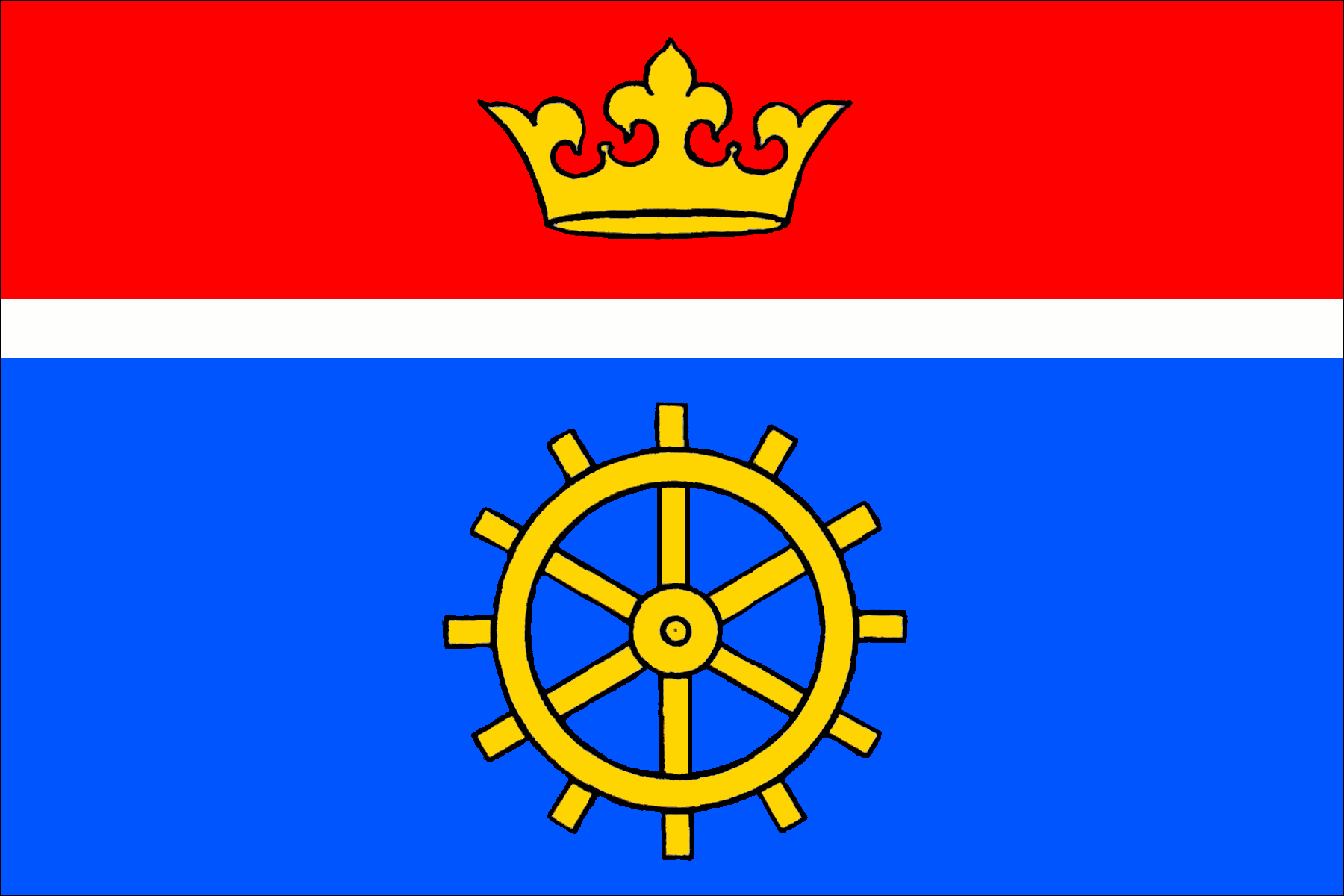
- Flag Coat of arms

- Location in the Czech Republic
- Coordinates: 49°59′45″N 14°15′52″E
- Country: Czech Republic
- Region: Central Bohemian
- District: Prague-West
- First mentioned: 1339

Area
  - Total: 4.20 km^{2} (1.62 sq mi)
- Elevation: 320 m (1,050 ft)

Population (2026-01-01)
  - Total: 436
  - Density: 104/km^{2} (269/sq mi)
- Time zone: UTC+1 (CET)
  - Summer (DST): UTC+2 (CEST)
- Postal code: 252 17
- Website: www.chynice.cz

Chýnice is a municipality and village in Prague-West District in the Central Bohemian Region of the Czech Republic. It has about 400 inhabitants.

== Demographics ==
Historical population
| Year | Pop. | ±% |
|---|---|---|
| 1869 | 282 | — |
| 1880 | 290 | +2.8% |
| 1890 | 288 | −0.7% |
| 1900 | 348 | +20.8% |
| 1910 | 351 | +0.9% |
| 1921 | 353 | +0.6% |
| 1930 | 365 | +3.4% |
| 1950 | 270 | −26.0% |
| 1961 | 255 | −5.6% |
| 1970 | 244 | −4.3% |
| 1980 | 232 | −4.9% |
| 1991 | 205 | −11.6% |
| 2001 | 228 | +11.2% |
| 2011 | 390 | +71.1% |
| 2021 | 468 | +20.0% |
Source: Censuses
