= Čisovice =

- Municipality
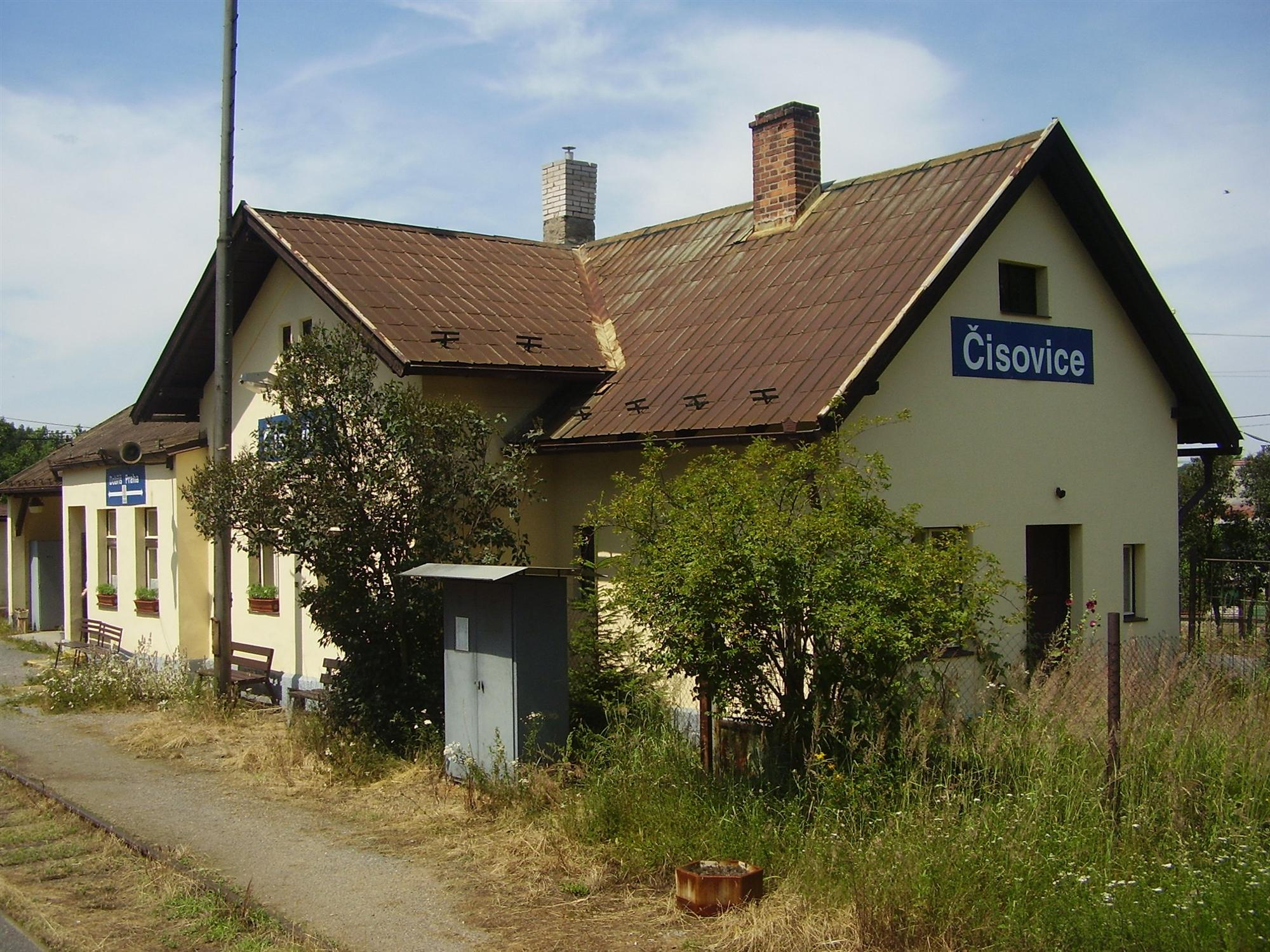
- Train station

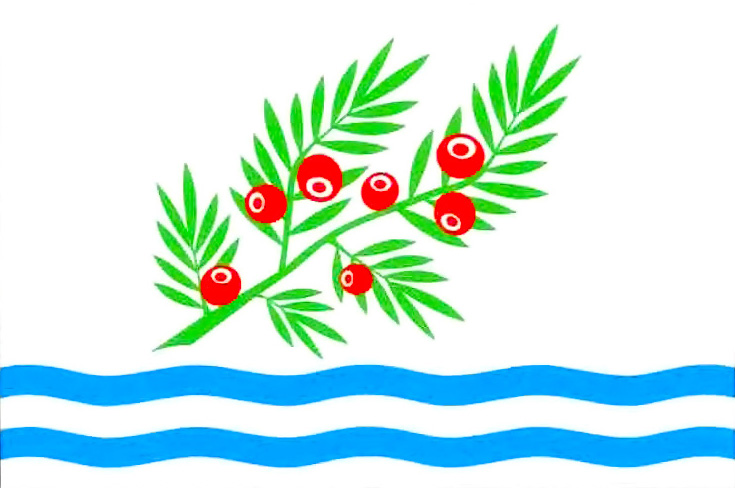
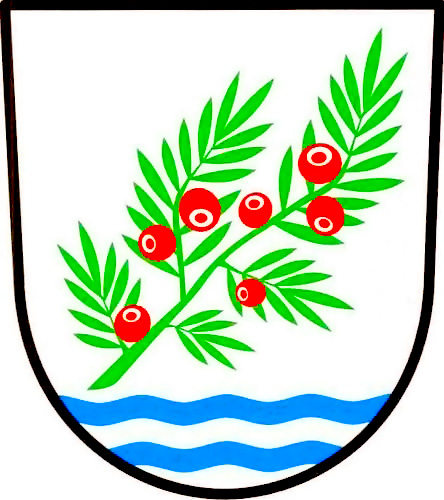
- Flag Coat of arms

- Location in the Czech Republic
- Coordinates: 49°51′48″N 14°18′53″E
- Country: Czech Republic
- Region: Central Bohemian
- District: Prague-West
- First mentioned: 1037

Area
  - Total: 12.00 km^{2} (4.63 sq mi)
- Elevation: 341 m (1,119 ft)

Population (2026-01-01)
  - Total: 1,182
  - Density: 98.50/km^{2} (255.1/sq mi)
- Time zone: UTC+1 (CET)
  - Summer (DST): UTC+2 (CEST)
- Postal code: 252 04
- Website: www.cisovice.cz

Čisovice is a municipality and village in Prague-West District in the Central Bohemian Region of the Czech Republic. It has about 1,200 inhabitants.

== Administrative division ==
Čisovice consists of two municipal parts (in brackets population according to the 2021 census):

- Čisovice (819)
- Bojov (346)

== Demographics ==
Historical population
Year	Pop.	±%
1869	779	—
1880	776	−0.4%
1890	774	−0.3%
1900	701	−9.4%
1910	719	+2.6%
1921	703	−2.2%
1930	702	−0.1%
1950	808	+15.1%
1961	850	+5.2%
1970	780	−8.2%
1980	725	−7.1%
1991	603	−16.8%
2001	703	+16.6%
2011	984	+40.0%
2021	1,165	+18.4%
Source: Censuses

== Notable people ==
- Zdeněk Kudrna (1946–1982), speedway rider
