= Úholičky =

- Municipality
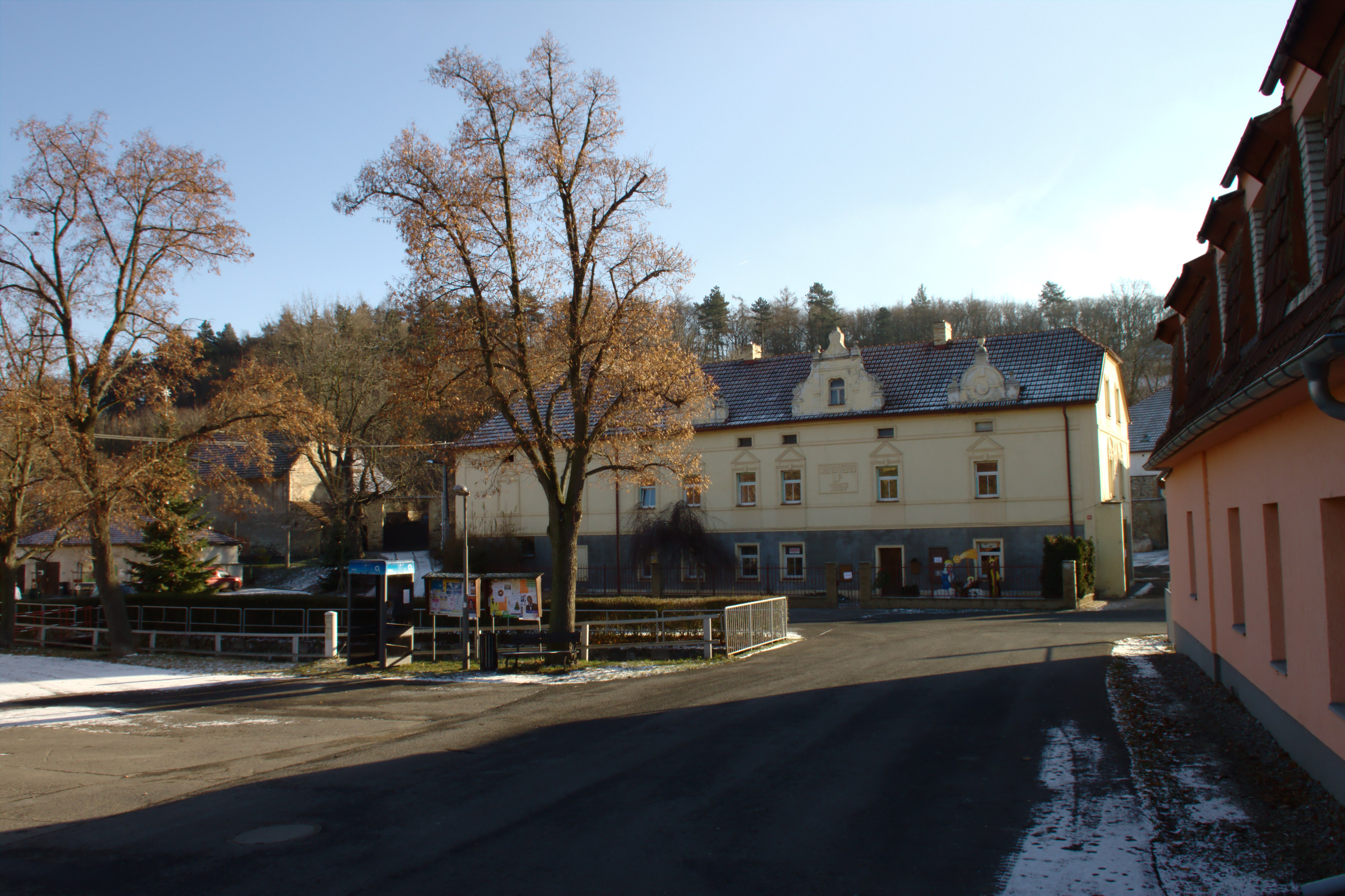
- Centre of Úholičky

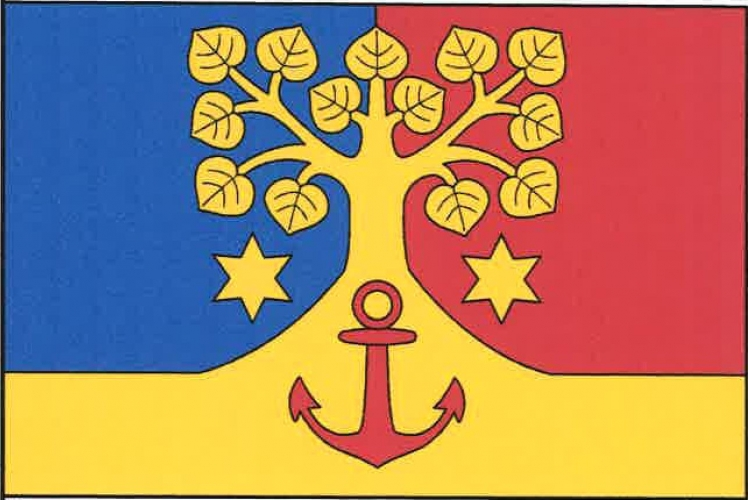
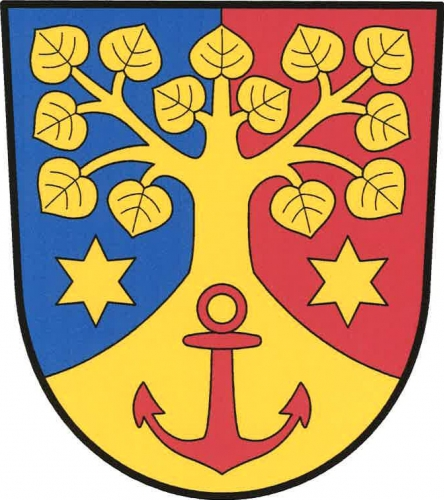
- Flag Coat of arms

- Location in the Czech Republic
- Coordinates: 50°9′41″N 14°20′7″E
- Country: Czech Republic
- Region: Central Bohemian
- District: Prague-West
- First mentioned: 14th century

Area
  - Total: 4.32 km^{2} (1.67 sq mi)
- Elevation: 253 m (830 ft)

Population (2026-01-01)
  - Total: 843
  - Density: 195/km^{2} (505/sq mi)
- Time zone: UTC+1 (CET)
  - Summer (DST): UTC+2 (CEST)
- Postal code: 252 64
- Website: www.obec-uholicky.cz

Úholičky is a municipality and village in Prague-West District in the Central Bohemian Region of the Czech Republic. It has about 800 inhabitants.

== Demographics ==
Historical population
| Year | Pop. | ±% |
|---|---|---|
| 1869 | 332 | — |
| 1880 | 349 | +5.1% |
| 1890 | 382 | +9.5% |
| 1900 | 430 | +12.6% |
| 1910 | 481 | +11.9% |
| 1921 | 525 | +9.1% |
| 1930 | 787 | +49.9% |
| 1950 | 631 | −19.8% |
| 1961 | 656 | +4.0% |
| 1970 | 611 | −6.9% |
| 1980 | 551 | −9.8% |
| 1991 | 466 | −15.4% |
| 2001 | 499 | +7.1% |
| 2011 | 711 | +42.5% |
| 2021 | 799 | +12.4% |
Source: Censuses
