= Roblín =

- Municipality
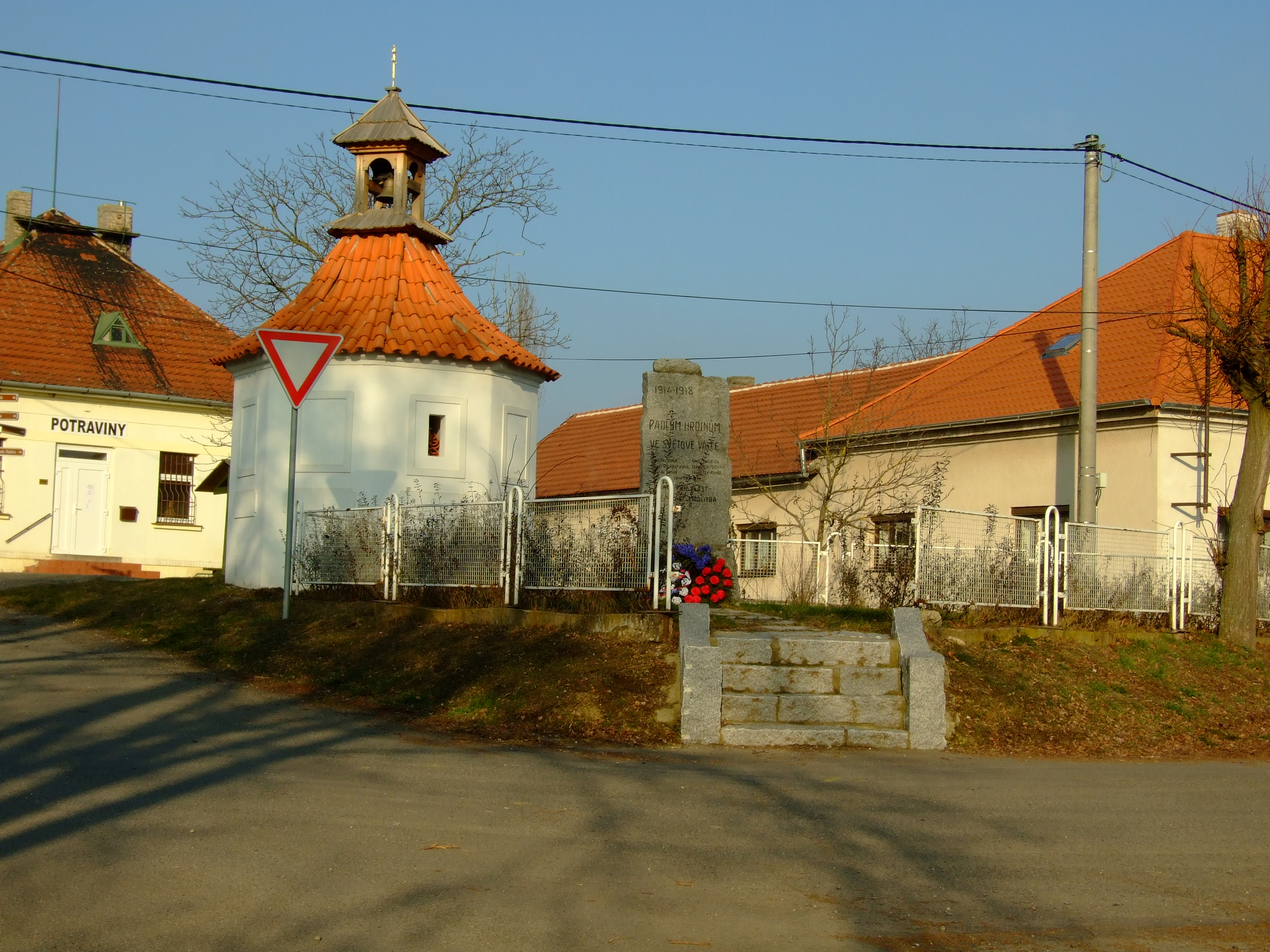
- Chapel in the centre of Roblín

- Flag Coat of arms

- Location in the Czech Republic
- Coordinates: 49°57′43″N 14°14′55″E
- Country: Czech Republic
- Region: Central Bohemian
- District: Prague-West
- First mentioned: 1365

Area
  - Total: 5.60 km^{2} (2.16 sq mi)
- Elevation: 368 m (1,207 ft)

Population (2026-01-01)
  - Total: 245
  - Density: 43.7/km^{2} (113/sq mi)
- Time zone: UTC+1 (CET)
  - Summer (DST): UTC+2 (CEST)
- Postal code: 252 26
- Website: www.roblin.cz

Roblín is a municipality and village in Prague-West District in the Central Bohemian Region of the Czech Republic. It has about 200 inhabitants.

== Administrative division ==
Roblín consists of two municipal parts (in brackets population according to the 2021 census):

- Roblín (164)
- Kuchařík (83)

== Demographics ==
Historical population
Year	Pop.	±%
1869	225	—
1880	244	+8.4%
1890	234	−4.1%
1900	244	+4.3%
1910	298	+22.1%
1921	309	+3.7%
1930	310	+0.3%
1950	217	−30.0%
1961	225	+3.7%
1970	194	−13.8%
1980	163	−16.0%
1991	143	−12.3%
2001	176	+23.1%
2011	221	+25.6%
2021	247	+11.8%
Source: Censuses
