= Svrkyně =

- Municipality
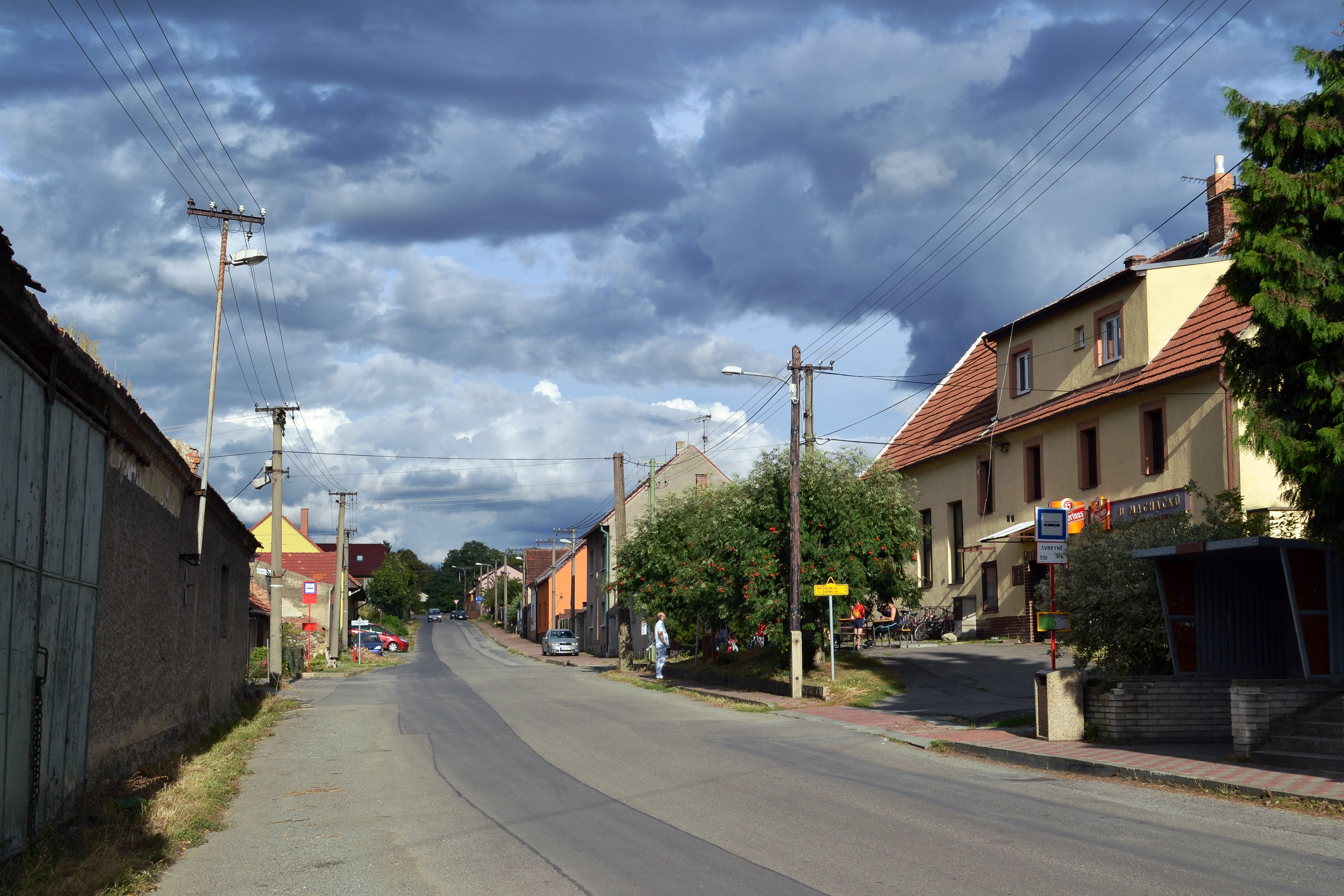
- Main street

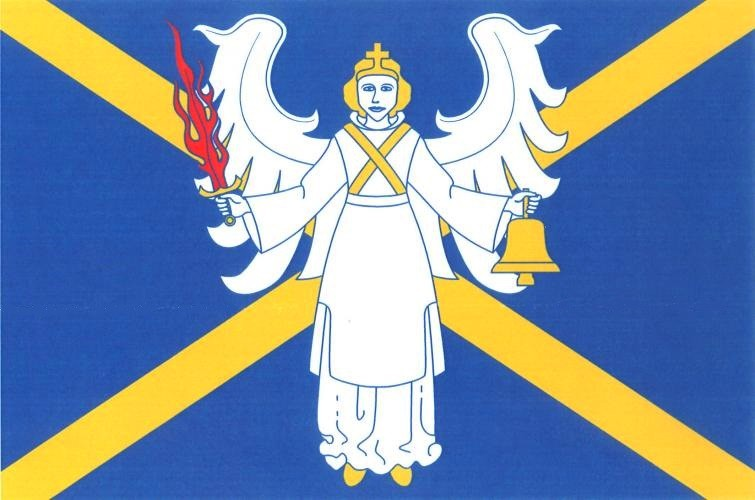
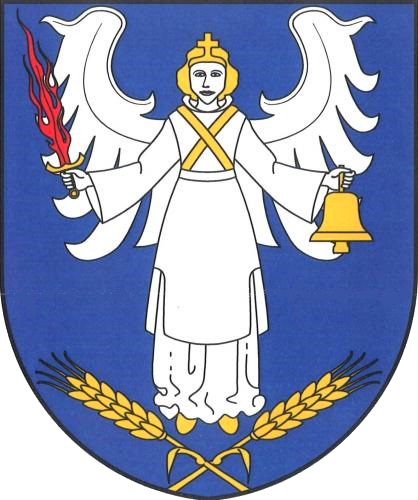
- Flag Coat of arms

- Location in the Czech Republic
- Coordinates: 50°10′17″N 14°17′42″E
- Country: Czech Republic
- Region: Central Bohemian
- District: Prague-West
- First mentioned: 1311

Area
  - Total: 5.96 km^{2} (2.30 sq mi)
- Elevation: 295 m (968 ft)

Population (2026-01-01)
  - Total: 312
  - Density: 52.3/km^{2} (136/sq mi)
- Time zone: UTC+1 (CET)
  - Summer (DST): UTC+2 (CEST)
- Postal code: 252 64
- Website: www.svrkyne.cz

Svrkyně is a municipality and village in Prague-West District in the Central Bohemian Region of the Czech Republic. It has about 300 inhabitants.

== Administrative division ==
Svrkyně consists of two municipal parts (in brackets population according to the 2021 census):

- Svrkyně (256)
- Hole (35)

== Demographics ==
Historical population
Year	Pop.	±%
1869	367	—
1880	407	+10.9%
1890	437	+7.4%
1900	458	+4.8%
1910	449	−2.0%
1921	440	−2.0%
1930	440	+0.0%
1950	275	−37.5%
1961	298	+8.4%
1970	261	−12.4%
1980	250	−4.2%
1991	220	−12.0%
2001	231	+5.0%
2011	288	+24.7%
2021	291	+1.0%
Source: Censuses
