= Prague-West District =

District in the Czech Republic

Prague-West District Okres Praha-západ
- District
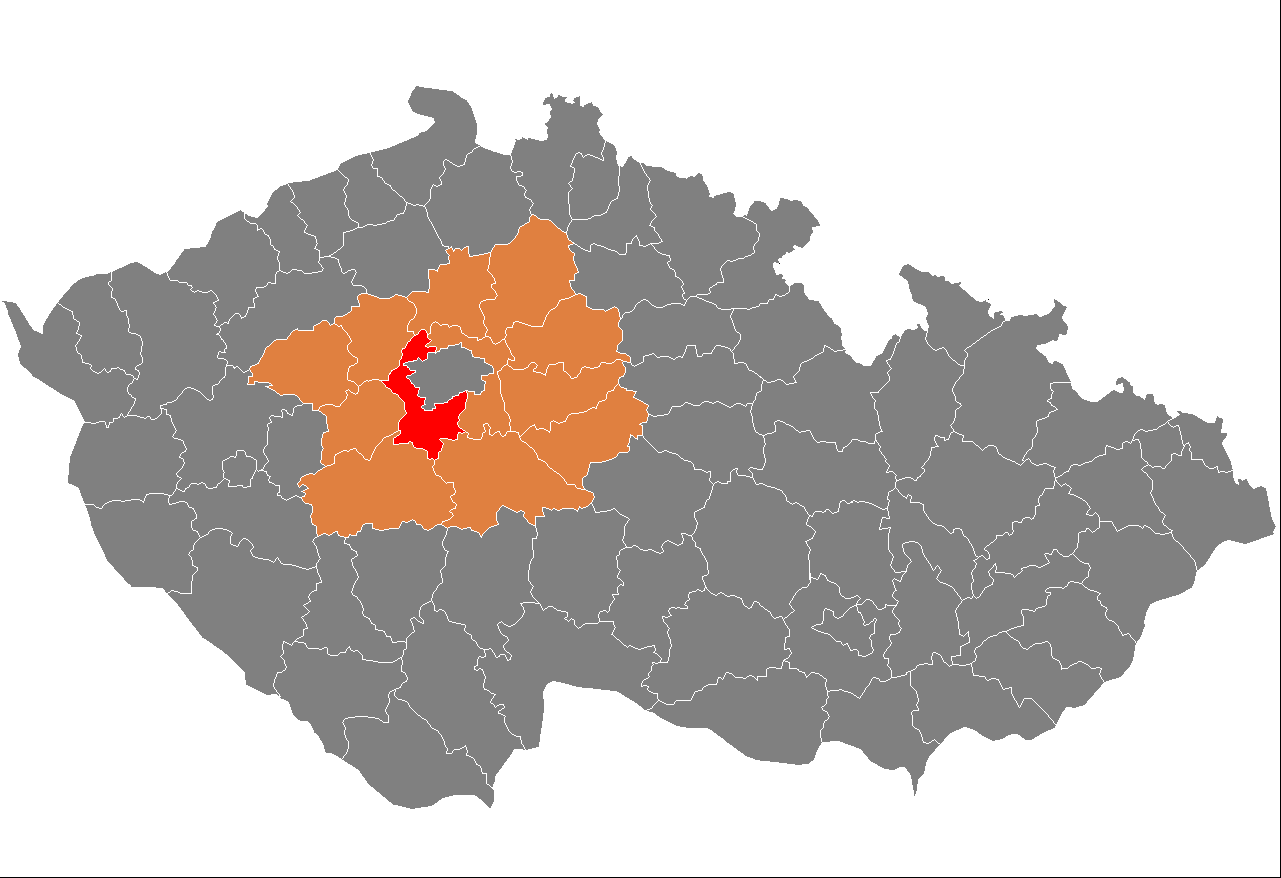
- Location in the Central Bohemian Region within the Czech Republic

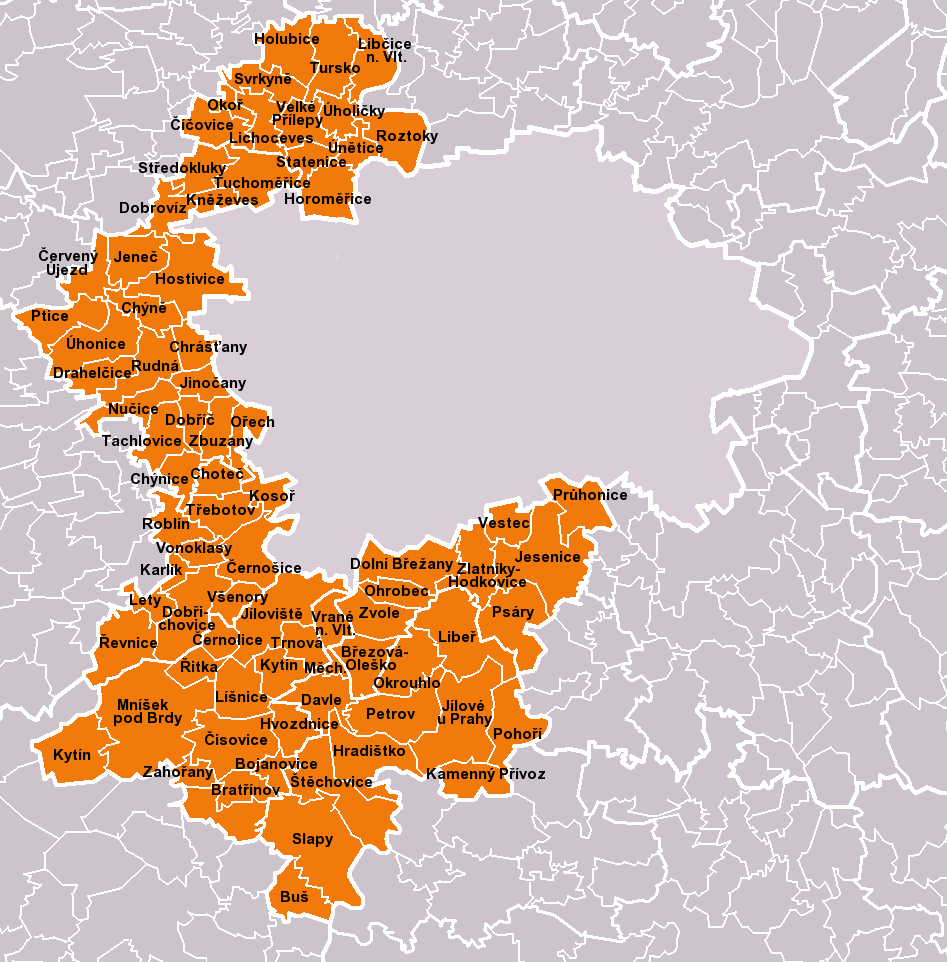
- Coordinates: 49°56′N 14°18′E
- Country: Czech Republic
- Region: Central Bohemian
- Capital: Prague

Area
  - Total: 580.35 km^{2} (224.07 sq mi)

Population (2026)
  - Total: 163,488
  - Density: 281.71/km^{2} (729.61/sq mi)
- Time zone: UTC+1 (CET)
  - Summer (DST): UTC+2 (CEST)
- Municipalities: 79
- * Towns: 11
- * Market towns: 2

Prague-West District (Czech: okres Praha-západ) is a district in the Central Bohemian Region of the Czech Republic. Its capital is Prague. The most populous town of the district is Jesenice.

== Administrative division ==
Prague-West District is formed by only one administrative district of municipality with extended competence: Černošice.

=== List of municipalities ===
Towns are marked in bold and market towns in italics:

Bojanovice – Bratřínov – Březová-Oleško – Buš – Černolice – Černošice – Červený Újezd – Choteč – Chrášťany – Chýně – Chýnice – Číčovice – Čisovice – Davle – Dobříč – Dobřichovice – Dobrovíz – Dolní Břežany – Drahelčice – Holubice – Horoměřice – Hostivice – Hradištko – Hvozdnice – Jeneč – Jesenice – Jílové u Prahy – Jíloviště – Jinočany – Kamenný Přívoz – Karlík – Klínec – Kněževes – Kosoř – Kytín – Lety – Libčice nad Vltavou – Libeř – Lichoceves – Líšnice – Měchenice – Mníšek pod Brdy – Nučice – Ohrobec – Okoř – Okrouhlo – Ořech – Petrov – Pohoří – Průhonice – Psáry – Ptice – Řevnice – Řitka – Roblín – Roztoky – Rudná – Slapy – Statenice – Štěchovice – Středokluky – Svrkyně – Tachlovice – Trnová – Třebotov – Tuchoměřice – Tursko – Úholičky – Úhonice – Únětice – Velké Přílepy – Vestec – Vonoklasy – Vrané nad Vltavou – Všenory – Zahořany – Zbuzany – Zlatníky-Hodkovice – Zvole

== Geography ==
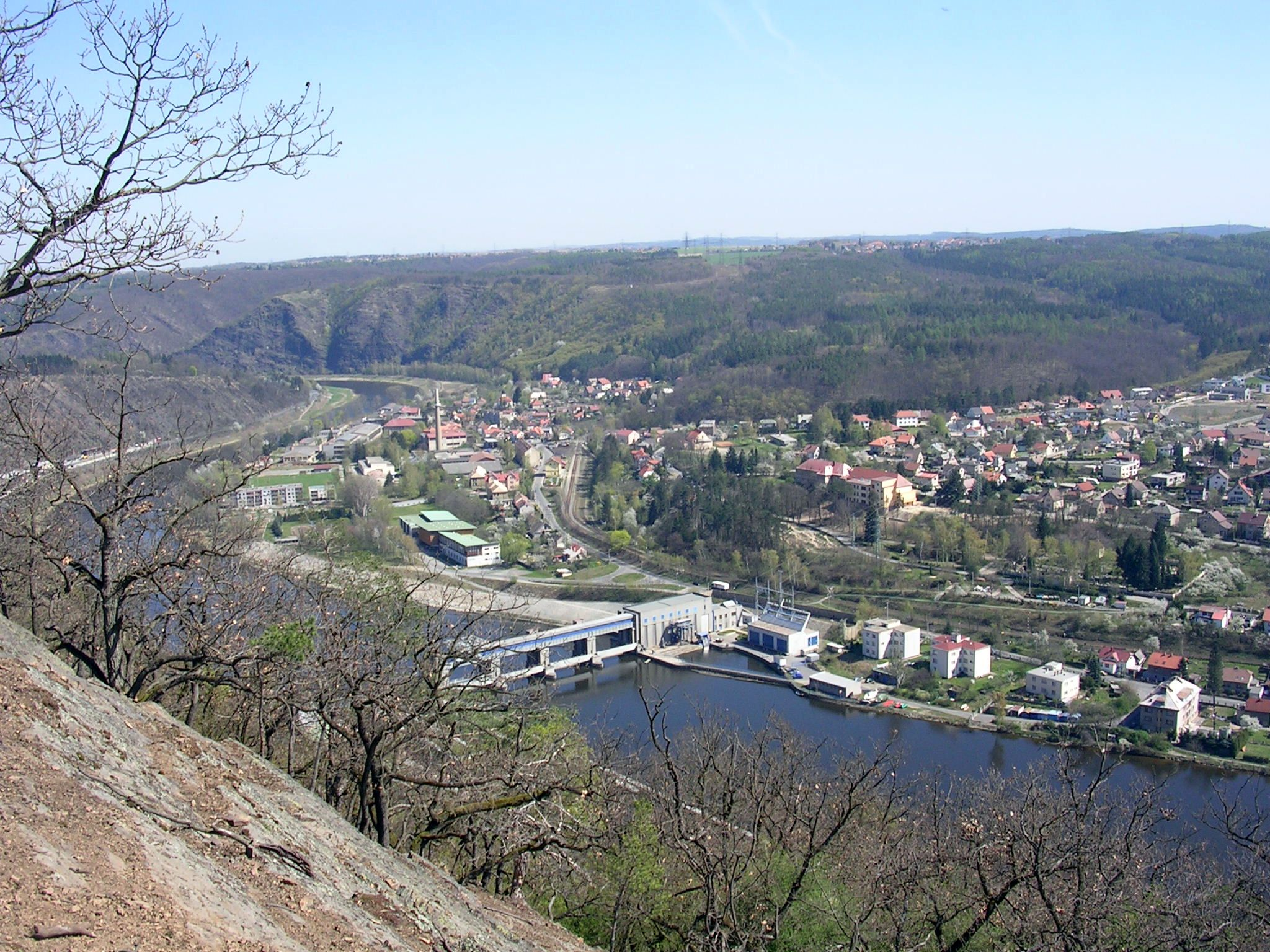
Vrané nad Vltavou in the Vltava valley

The territory of the district forms a half-moon surrounding Prague from the west. The elongated shape of the territory thus extends into different types of landscapes, in the north rather flat, in the south more rugged and hilly. It extends into five geomorphological mesoregions: Prague Plateau (north and east), Křivoklát Highlands (a small part in the west), Hořovice Uplands (an elongated part around the Berounka River), Brdy Highlands (elongated part south of the Berounka) and Benešov Uplands (south). The highest point of the district is the hill Lípový vrch in Libeř with an elevation of 458 m (1,503 ft), the lowest point is the river bed of the Vltava in Libčice nad Vltavou at 170 m (560 ft).

From the total district area of 580.4 km^{2} (224.1 sq mi), agricultural land occupies 332.0 km^{2} (128.2 sq mi), forests occupy 159.9 km^{2} (61.7 sq mi), and water area occupies 11.4 km^{2} (4.4 sq mi). Forests cover 27.5% of the district's area.

The most important rivers are the Vltava and Berounka, both flowing through the southern part of the district and heading to their confluence on the territory of Prague. The Vltava also briefly forms the district border in the north, after it leaves Prague. In the eastern part of the district, the Sázava flows into the Vltava. The territory is rather poor in bodies of water, but there are three large reservoirs on the Vltava: Slapy (partly), Štěchovice and Vrané.

Bohemian Karst is the only protected landscape area that extends into the district, in its central part.

== Demographics ==
Thanks to its proximity to Prague, Prague-West District belongs to the fastest growing districts in the country in the 21st century.

Historical population

Year	Pop.	±%
1869	45,598	—
1880	48,812	+7.0%
1890	51,895	+6.3%
1900	55,509	+7.0%
1910	59,005	+6.3%

Year	Pop.	±%
1921	59,595	+1.0%
1930	73,600	+23.5%
1950	74,199	+0.8%
1961	80,572	+8.6%
1970	77,747	−3.5%

Year	Pop.	±%
1980	77,428	−0.4%
1991	74,265	−4.1%
2001	82,404	+11.0%
2011	131,231	+59.3%
2021	161,593	+23.1%

Source: Censuses

=== Most populous municipalities ===
Name	Population	Area (km^{2})
Jesenice	10,625	18
Hostivice	9,266	14
Roztoky	9,147	8
Černošice	7,781	9
Mníšek pod Brdy	6,377	27
Horoměřice	5,586	8
Rudná	5,560	8
Jílové u Prahy	5,301	16
Chýně	5,168	5
Dolní Břežany	4,806	11

== Economy ==
The largest employers with headquarters in Prague-West District and at least 500 employees are:

Economic entity	Location	Number of employees	Main activity
Amazon Logistic Prague	Dobrovíz	3,000–3,999	Transportation support activities
Schenker	Nučice	1,500–1,999	Warehousing and storage
Řízení letového provozu České republiky	Jeneč	1,000–1,499	Service activities for air transportation
IPSOS	Černošice	1,000–1,499	Market research and public opinion polling
Scania Czech Republic	Chrášťany	500–999	Maintenance and repair of motor vehicles
ČEZ Energetické produkty	Hostivice	500–999	Repair and manufacture of machinery
Orifarm Supply	Hostivice	500–999	Import of medicines
Swiss Automotive Group CZ	Hostivice	500–999	Retail trade of motor vehicle parts
empea cz	Jesenice	500–999	Advertising
GEMINI oční klinika	Průhonice	500–999	Health care
Stavmat stavebniny	Rudná	500–999	Wholesale trade

== Transport ==
The territory of the district is crossed by several motorways leading from Prague: the D4 motorway to Písek, the D5 motorway to Plzeň, the D6 motorway to Karlovy Vary, and the D7 motorway to Chomutov. Part of the D0 motorway also passes through the district.

== Sights ==
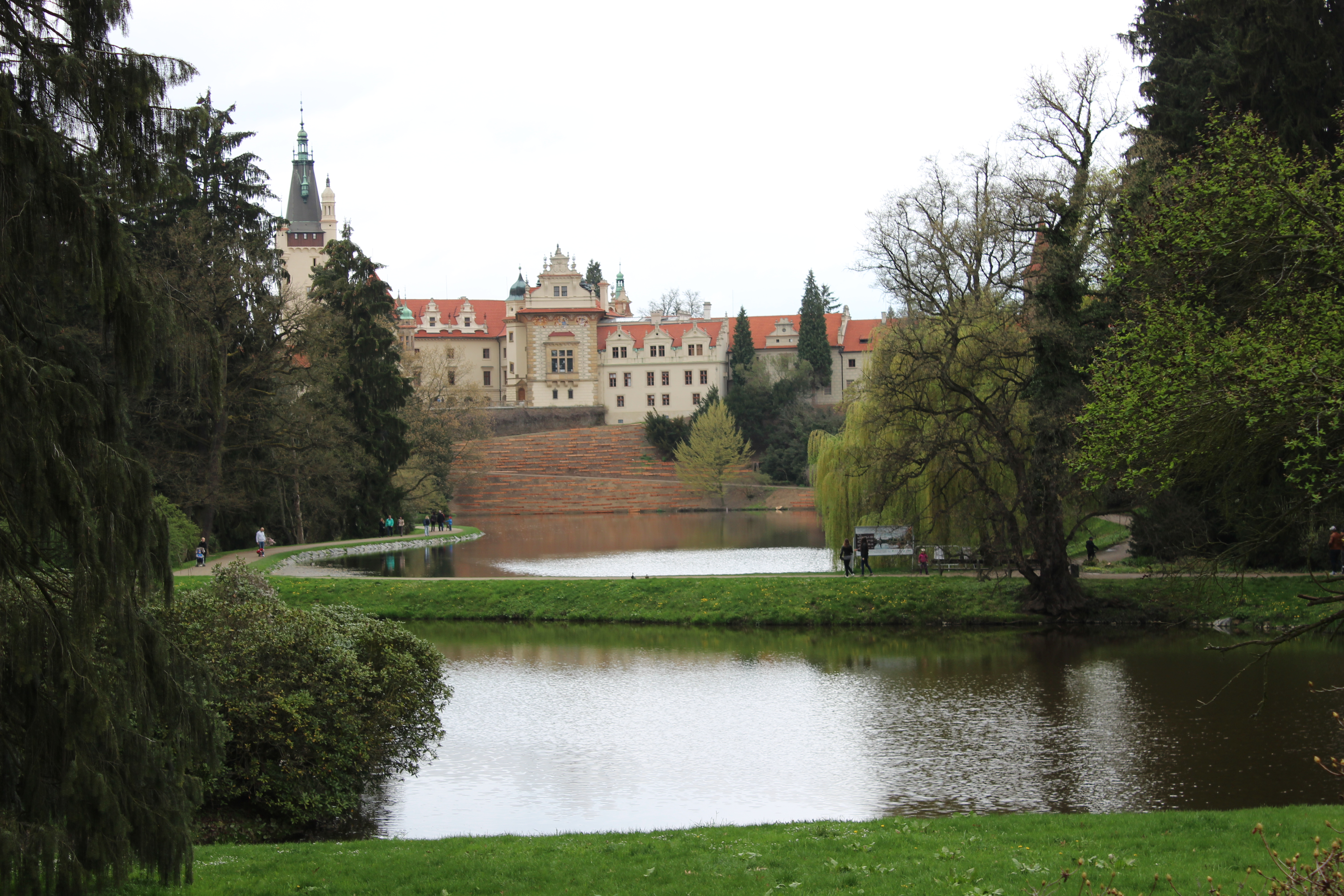
Průhonice Castle and its park

The Průhonice Castle Park was designated a UNESCO World Heritage Site in 2010 (as part of Historic Centre of Prague). It is described as "original masterpiece of garden landscape architecture of worldwide importance".

The most important monuments in the district, protected as national cultural monuments, are:

- Levý Hradec gord
- Gord and Celtic oppidum Závist in Dolní Břežany
- Průhonice Castle

The best-preserved settlements and archaeological sites, protected as monument reservations and monument zones, are:

- Dobrovíz (monument reservation)
- Levý Hradec gord area (monument reservation)
- Jílové u Prahy (monument zone)
- Mníšek pod Brdy (monument zone)

The most visited tourist destination is the Průhonice castle & arboretum.
