= Číčovice =

- Municipality
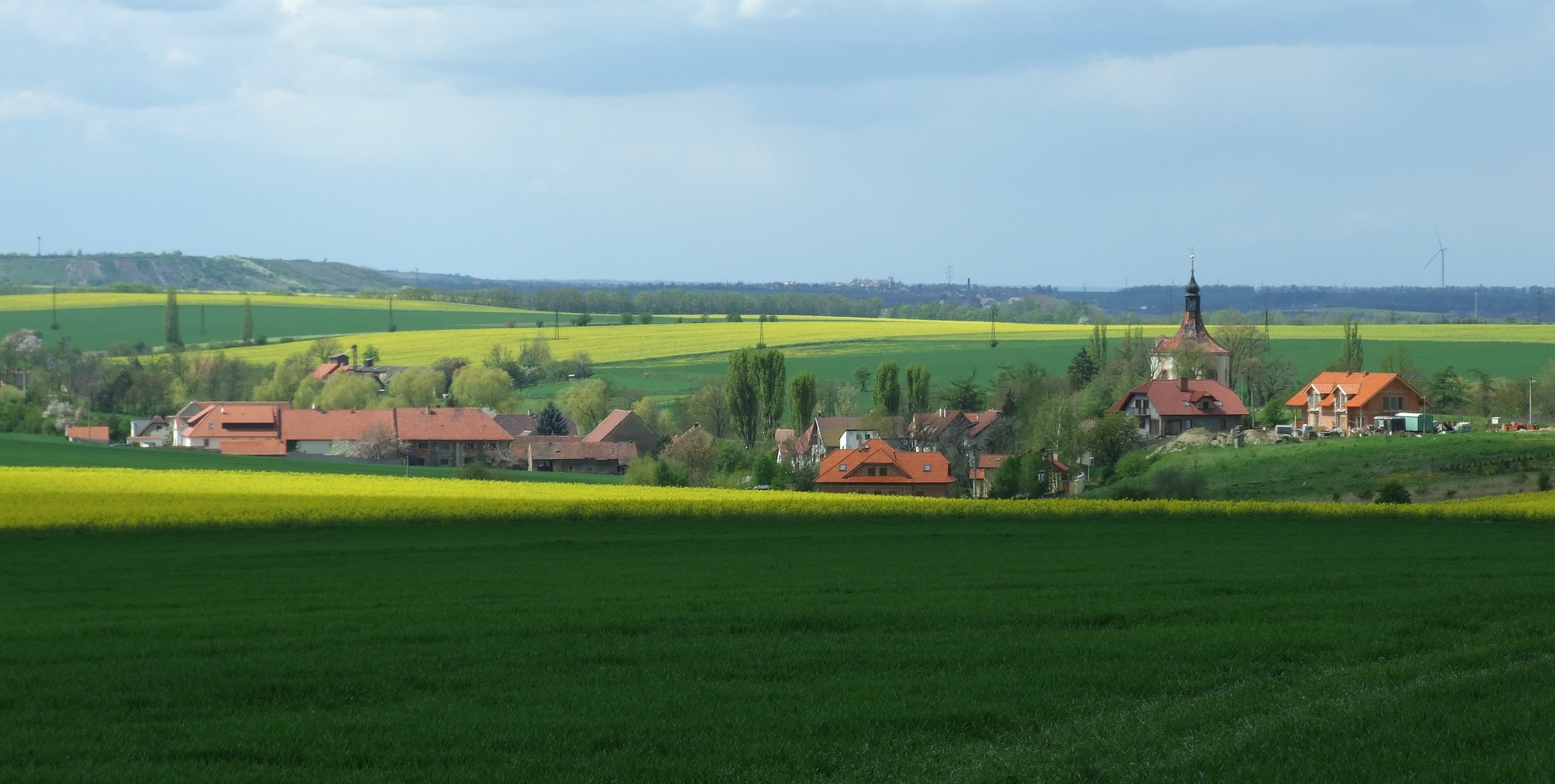
- View from the southeast

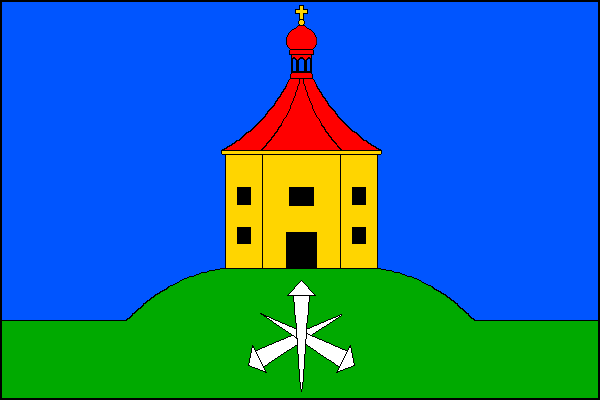
- Flag Coat of arms

- Location in the Czech Republic
- Coordinates: 50°9′24″N 14°14′58″E
- Country: Czech Republic
- Region: Central Bohemian
- District: Prague-West
- First mentioned: 1542

Area
  - Total: 6.52 km^{2} (2.52 sq mi)
- Elevation: 283 m (928 ft)

Population (2026-01-01)
  - Total: 335
  - Density: 51.4/km^{2} (133/sq mi)
- Time zone: UTC+1 (CET)
  - Summer (DST): UTC+2 (CEST)
- Postal code: 252 68
- Website: www.cicovice.cz

Číčovice is a municipality and village in Prague-West District in the Central Bohemian Region of the Czech Republic. It has about 300 inhabitants.

== Demographics ==
Historical population
Year	Pop.	±%
1869	452	—
1880	483	+6.9%
1890	516	+6.8%
1900	541	+4.8%
1910	513	−5.2%
1921	449	−12.5%
1930	455	+1.3%
1950	327	−28.1%
1961	317	−3.1%
1970	302	−4.7%
1980	297	−1.7%
1991	277	−6.7%
2001	261	−5.8%
2011	274	+5.0%
2021	316	+15.3%
Source: Censuses
