= Vonoklasy =

- Municipality
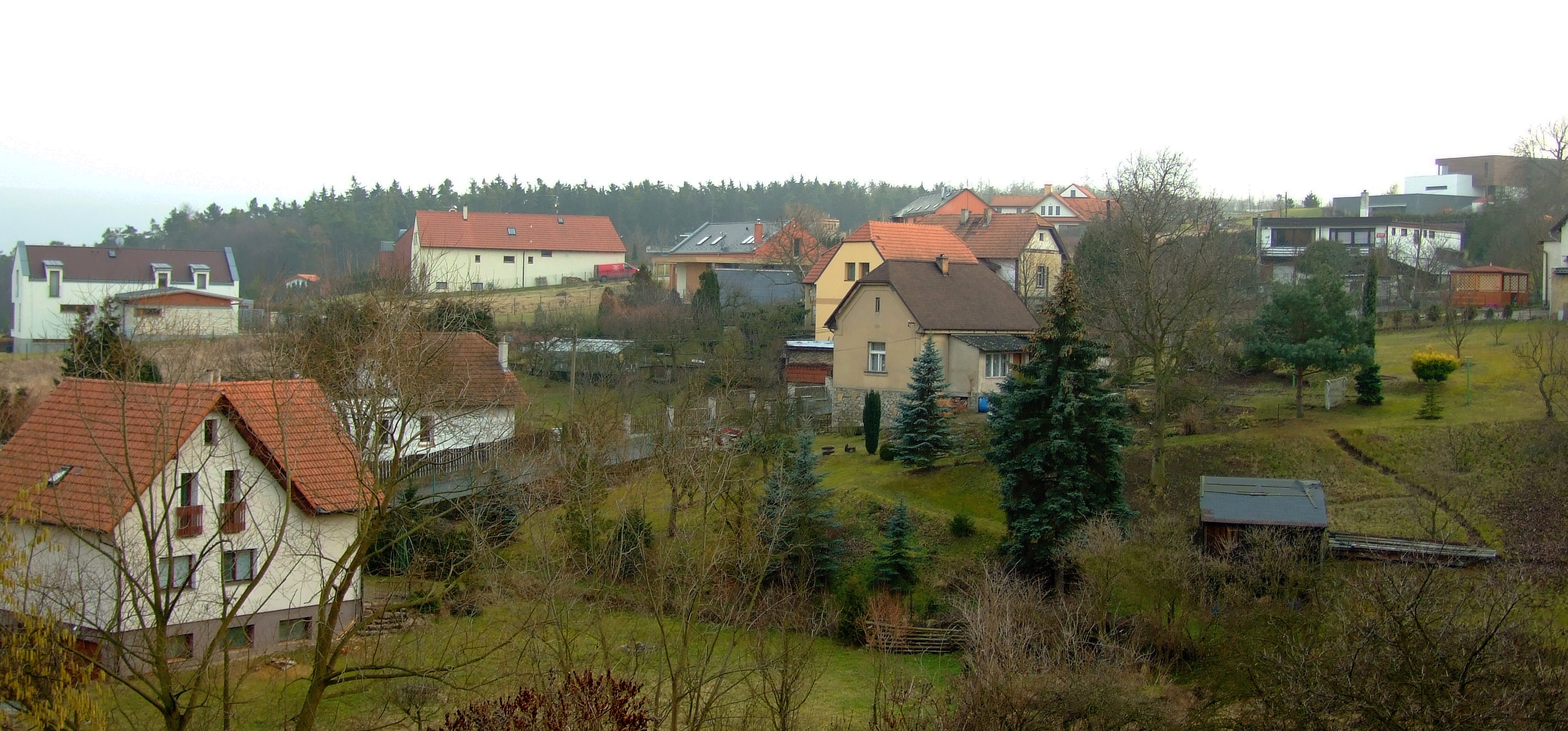
- Southern part of Vonoklasy

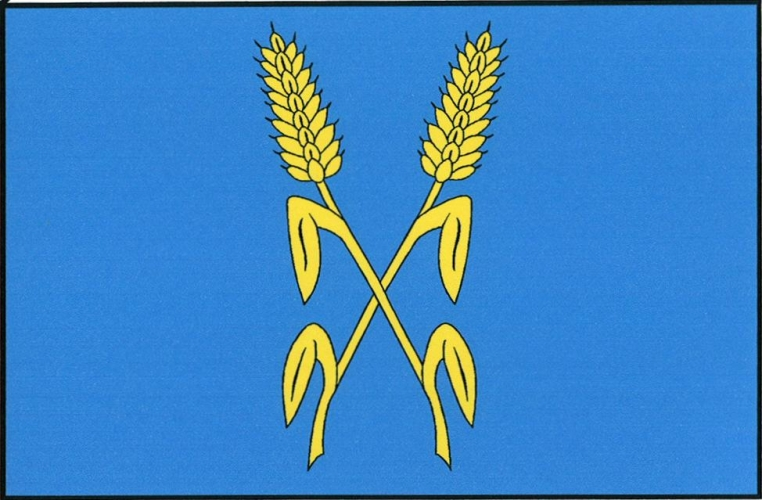
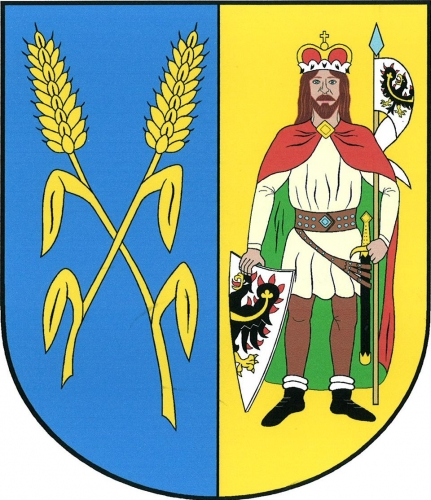
- Flag Coat of arms

- Location in the Czech Republic
- Coordinates: 49°57′0″N 14°16′36″E
- Country: Czech Republic
- Region: Central Bohemian
- District: Prague-West
- First mentioned: 1227

Area
  - Total: 3.02 km^{2} (1.17 sq mi)
- Elevation: 326 m (1,070 ft)

Population (2026-01-01)
  - Total: 567
  - Density: 188/km^{2} (486/sq mi)
- Time zone: UTC+1 (CET)
  - Summer (DST): UTC+2 (CEST)
- Postal code: 252 28
- Website: www.vonoklasy.cz

Vonoklasy is a municipality and village in Prague-West District in the Central Bohemian Region of the Czech Republic. It has about 600 inhabitants.

== Demographics ==
Historical population
Year	Pop.	±%
1869	336	—
1880	355	+5.7%
1890	373	+5.1%
1900	361	−3.2%
1910	385	+6.6%
1921	390	+1.3%
1930	408	+4.6%
1950	421	+3.2%
1961	404	−4.0%
1970	387	−4.2%
1980	322	−16.8%
1991	338	+5.0%
2001	374	+10.7%
2011	487	+30.2%
2021	569	+16.8%
Source: Censuses
