= Úhonice =

- Municipality
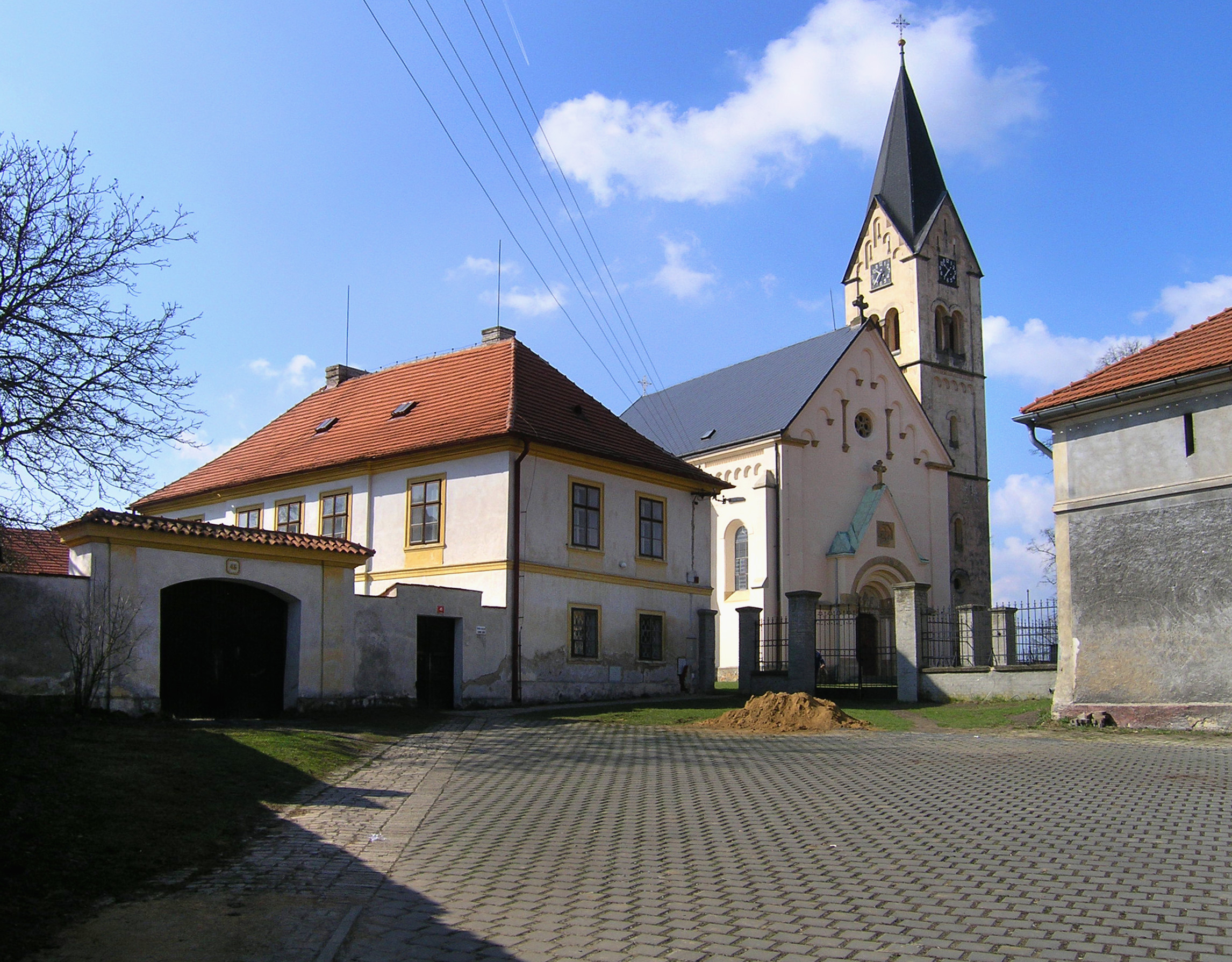
- Church of the Virgin Mary

- Flag Coat of arms

- Location in the Czech Republic
- Coordinates: 50°2′36″N 14°11′11″E
- Country: Czech Republic
- Region: Central Bohemian
- District: Prague-West
- First mentioned: 1143

Area
  - Total: 9.93 km^{2} (3.83 sq mi)
- Elevation: 384 m (1,260 ft)

Population (2026-01-01)
  - Total: 1,301
  - Density: 131/km^{2} (339/sq mi)
- Time zone: UTC+1 (CET)
  - Summer (DST): UTC+2 (CEST)
- Postal code: 252 18
- Website: www.uhonice-obec.cz

Úhonice is a municipality and village in Prague-West District in the Central Bohemian Region of the Czech Republic. It has about 1,300 inhabitants.

== Demographics ==
Historical population
Year	Pop.	±%
1869	635	—
1880	632	−0.5%
1890	668	+5.7%
1900	804	+20.4%
1910	854	+6.2%
1921	822	−3.7%
1930	811	−1.3%
1950	724	−10.7%
1961	797	+10.1%
1970	758	−4.9%
1980	715	−5.7%
1991	810	+13.3%
2001	856	+5.7%
2011	1,040	+21.5%
2021	1,185	+13.9%
Source: Censuses
