= Zbuzany =

- Municipality
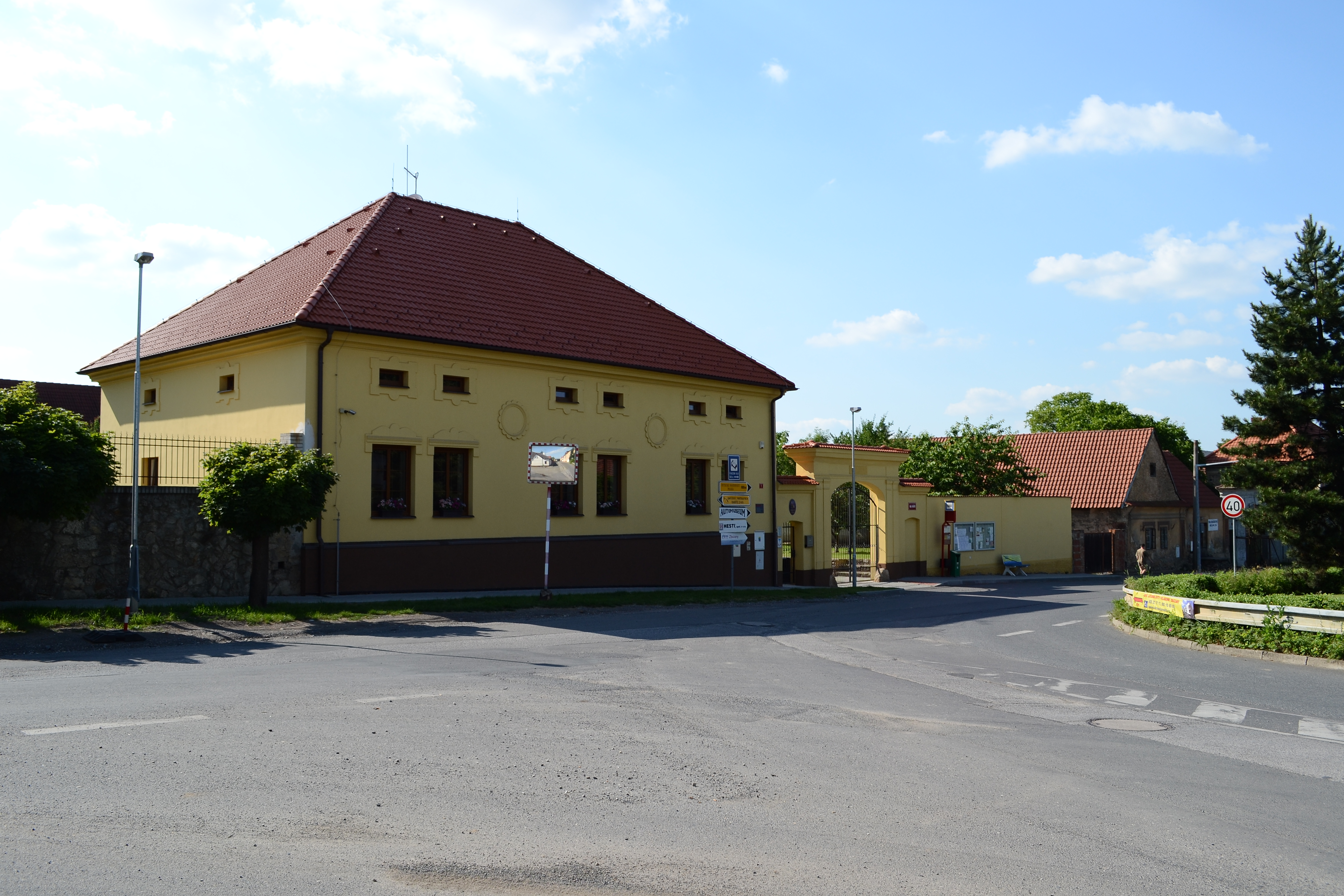
- Municipal office

- Flag Coat of arms

- Location in the Czech Republic
- Coordinates: 50°1′27″N 14°17′13″E
- Country: Czech Republic
- Region: Central Bohemian
- District: Prague-West
- First mentioned: 1395

Area
  - Total: 4.92 km^{2} (1.90 sq mi)
- Elevation: 360 m (1,180 ft)

Population (2026-01-01)
  - Total: 1,416
  - Density: 288/km^{2} (745/sq mi)
- Time zone: UTC+1 (CET)
  - Summer (DST): UTC+2 (CEST)
- Postal code: 252 25
- Website: www.zbuzany.eu

Zbuzany is a municipality and village in Prague-West District in the Central Bohemian Region of the Czech Republic. It has about 1,400 inhabitants.

== Demographics ==
Historical population
Year	Pop.	±%
1869	215	—
1880	253	+17.7%
1890	234	−7.5%
1900	272	+16.2%
1910	301	+10.7%
1921	312	+3.7%
1930	691	+121.5%
1950	575	−16.8%
1961	684	+19.0%
1970	676	−1.2%
1980	633	−6.4%
1991	568	−10.3%
2001	630	+10.9%
2011	1,003	+59.2%
2021	1,559	+55.4%
Source: Censuses
