= Pohoří (Prague-West District) =

- Municipality
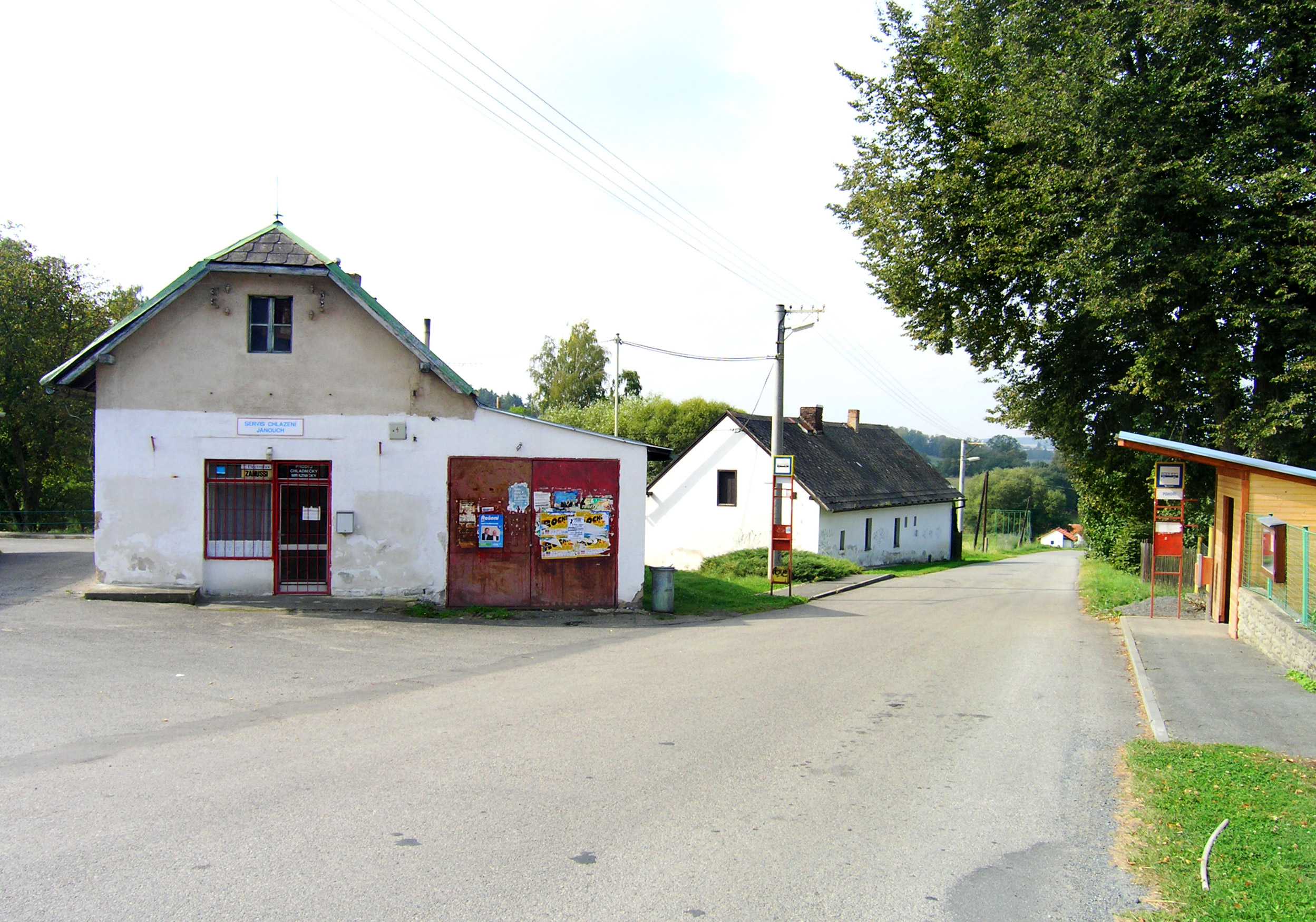
- Main street

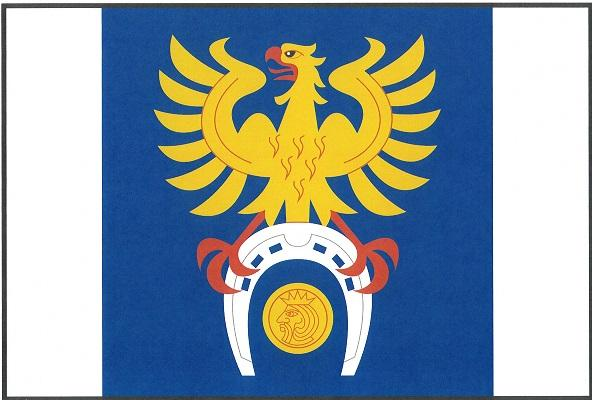
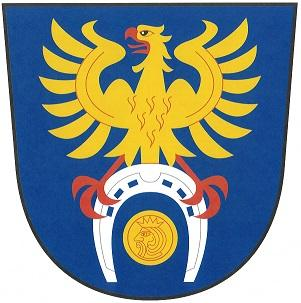
- Flag Coat of arms

- Location in the Czech Republic
- Coordinates: 49°54′0″N 14°31′30″E
- Country: Czech Republic
- Region: Central Bohemian
- District: Prague-West
- First mentioned: 1402

Area
  - Total: 8.78 km^{2} (3.39 sq mi)
- Elevation: 400 m (1,300 ft)

Population (2026-01-01)
  - Total: 426
  - Density: 48.5/km^{2} (126/sq mi)
- Time zone: UTC+1 (CET)
  - Summer (DST): UTC+2 (CEST)
- Postal code: 254 01
- Website: www.obec-pohori.cz

Pohoří is a municipality and village in Prague-West District in the Central Bohemian Region of the Czech Republic. It has about 400 inhabitants.

== Administrative division ==
Pohoří consists of three municipal parts (in brackets population according to the 2021 census):

- Pohoří (130)
- Chotouň (182)
- Skalsko (111)

== Demographics ==
Historical population
Year	Pop.	±%
1869	262	—
1880	270	+3.1%
1890	258	−4.4%
1900	222	−14.0%
1910	263	+18.5%
1921	254	−3.4%
1930	239	−5.9%
1950	213	−10.9%
1961	207	−2.8%
1970	191	−7.7%
1980	156	−18.3%
1991	160	+2.6%
2001	164	+2.5%
2011	359	+118.9%
2021	423	+17.8%
Source: Censuses
