= Hvozdnice (Prague-West District) =

- Municipality
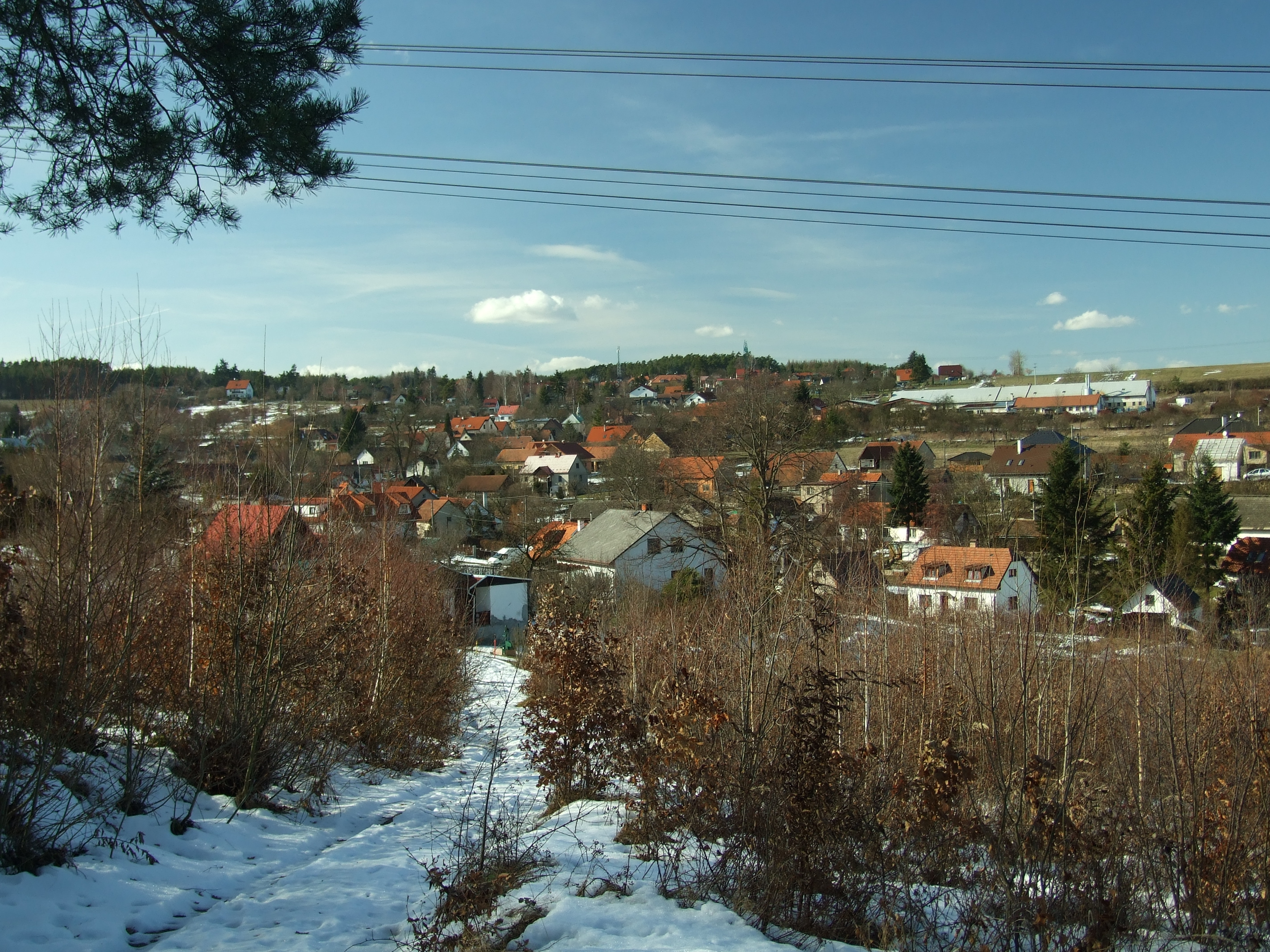
- View from the south

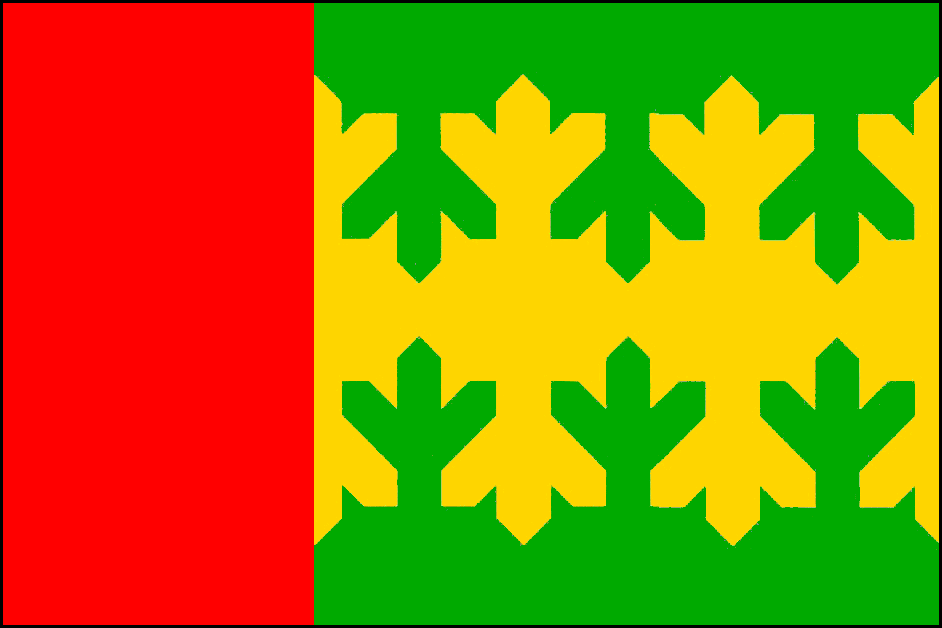
- Flag Coat of arms

- Location in the Czech Republic
- Coordinates: 49°52′20″N 14°22′16″E
- Country: Czech Republic
- Region: Central Bohemian
- District: Prague-West
- First mentioned: 999

Area
  - Total: 4.71 km^{2} (1.82 sq mi)
- Elevation: 345 m (1,132 ft)

Population (2026-01-01)
  - Total: 586
  - Density: 124/km^{2} (322/sq mi)
- Time zone: UTC+1 (CET)
  - Summer (DST): UTC+2 (CEST)
- Postal code: 252 05
- Website: www.hvozdnice.eu

Hvozdnice is a municipality and village in Prague-West District in the Central Bohemian Region of the Czech Republic. It has about 600 inhabitants.

== Demographics ==
Historical population
Year	Pop.	±%
1869	305	—
1880	308	+1.0%
1890	348	+13.0%
1900	382	+9.8%
1910	414	+8.4%
1921	440	+6.3%
1930	479	+8.9%
1950	501	+4.6%
1961	482	−3.8%
1970	418	−13.3%
1980	359	−14.1%
1991	278	−22.6%
2001	302	+8.6%
2011	463	+53.3%
2021	615	+32.8%
Source: Censuses
