= Dobříč (Prague-West District) =

- Municipality
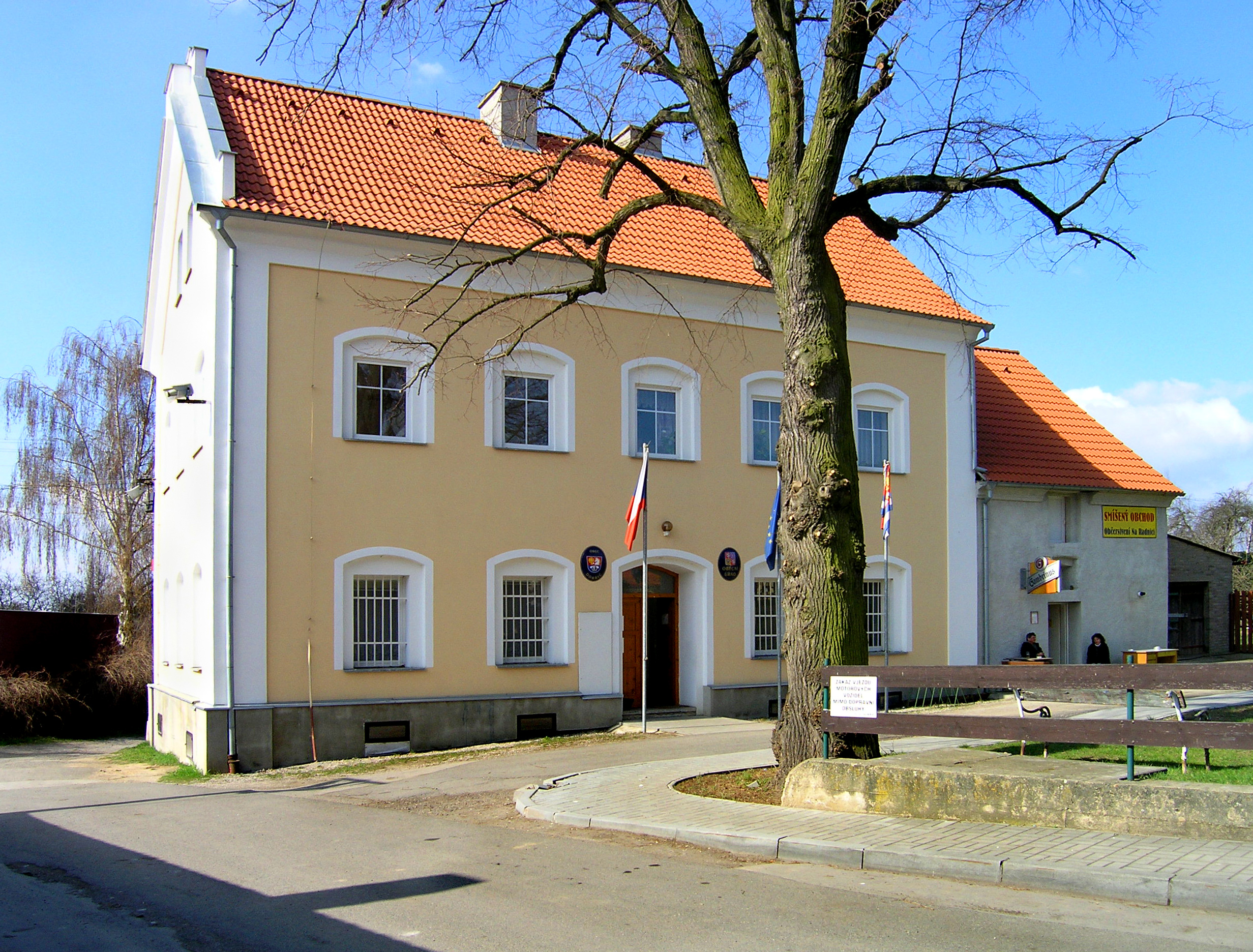
- Municipal office

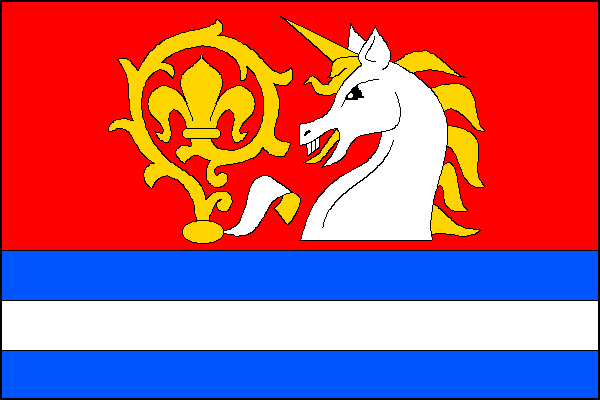
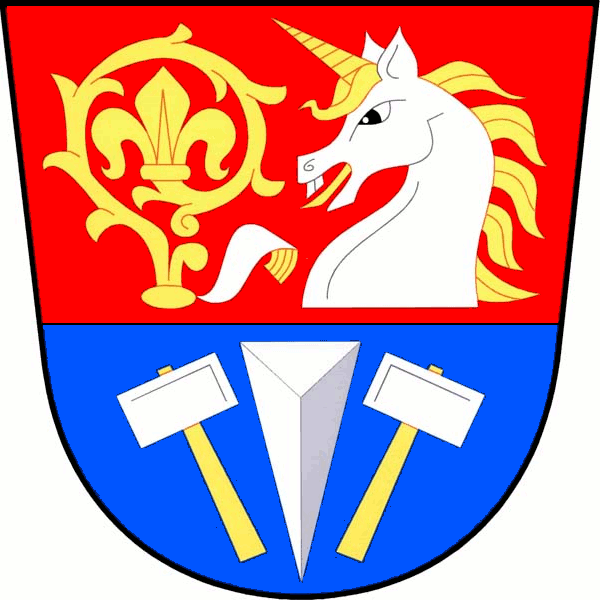
- Flag Coat of arms

- Location in the Czech Republic
- Coordinates: 50°1′12″N 14°15′32″E
- Country: Czech Republic
- Region: Central Bohemian
- District: Prague-West
- First mentioned: 1205

Area
  - Total: 3.49 km^{2} (1.35 sq mi)
- Elevation: 375 m (1,230 ft)

Population (2026-01-01)
  - Total: 461
  - Density: 132/km^{2} (342/sq mi)
- Time zone: UTC+1 (CET)
  - Summer (DST): UTC+2 (CEST)
- Postal code: 252 25
- Website: www.dobric-pz.cz

Dobříč is a municipality and village in Prague-West District in the Central Bohemian Region of the Czech Republic. It has about 500 inhabitants.

== Demographics ==
Historical population
Year	Pop.	±%
1869	252	—
1880	255	+1.2%
1890	352	+38.0%
1900	435	+23.6%
1910	468	+7.6%
1921	506	+8.1%
1930	482	−4.7%
1950	357	−25.9%
1961	363	+1.7%
1970	329	−9.4%
1980	274	−16.7%
1991	249	−9.1%
2001	266	+6.8%
2011	300	+12.8%
2021	459	+53.0%
Source: Censuses
