= Zlatníky-Hodkovice =

Municipality in the Czech Republic

- Municipality
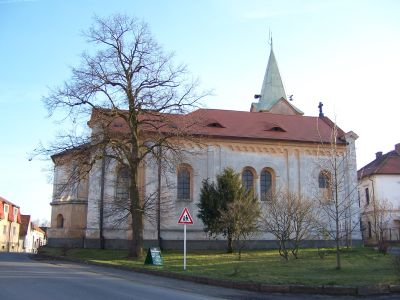
- Church of Saints Peter and Paul

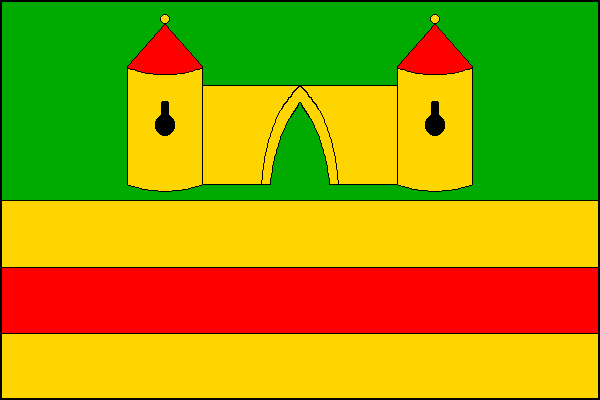
- Flag Coat of arms

- Location in the Czech Republic
- Coordinates: 49°57′36″N 14°28′53″E
- Country: Czech Republic
- Region: Central Bohemian
- District: Prague-West
- First mentioned: 1300

Area
  - Total: 7.65 km^{2} (2.95 sq mi)
- Elevation: 361 m (1,184 ft)

Population (2026-01-01)
  - Total: 1,392
  - Density: 182/km^{2} (471/sq mi)
- Time zone: UTC+1 (CET)
  - Summer (DST): UTC+2 (CEST)
- Postal code: 252 41
- Website: www.zlatniky-hodkovice.cz

Zlatníky-Hodkovice is a municipality in Prague-West District in the Central Bohemian Region of the Czech Republic. It has about 1,400 inhabitants.

== Administrative division ==
Zlatníky-Hodkovice consists of two municipal parts (in brackets population according to the 2021 census):

- Zlatníky (1,030)
- Hodkovice (406)

== Etymology ==
The name Zlatníky is derived from the Czech adjective zlatný, i.e 'golden'. The name refers to the gold mining in the area.

The name Hodkovice is derived from the personal name Hodek, meaning "the village of Hodek's people".

== Geography ==
Zlatníky-Hodkovice is located south of Prague, in its immediate vicinity. It lies in a flat agricultural landscape in the Prague Plateau.

== History ==
The first written mention of Zlatníky is from 1300. Hodkovice was first mentioned in 1314. Both villages were divided into several parts that had different owners.

In 1961, the formerly independent municipality of Hodkovice was joined to Zlatníky as its municipal part. Since 1999, the municipality has its current name.

== Demographics ==
Historical population

Year	Pop.	±%
1869	615	—
1880	606	−1.5%
1890	619	+2.1%
1900	570	−7.9%
1910	655	+14.9%

Year	Pop.	±%
1921	634	−3.2%
1930	798	+25.9%
1950	610	−23.6%
1961	641	+5.1%
1970	651	+1.6%

Year	Pop.	±%
1980	705	+8.3%
1991	768	+8.9%
2001	903	+17.6%
2011	1,287	+42.5%
2021	1,436	+11.6%

Source: Censuses

== Transport ==
The D0 motorway (part of the European route E50) runs through the northern part of the municipality.

== Sights ==
The main landmark of the municipality is the Church of Saints Peter and Paul in Zlatníky. The original church was first documented in 1377. The current Neo-Romanesque building replaced the old church in 1857.
