= Kosoř =

- Municipality
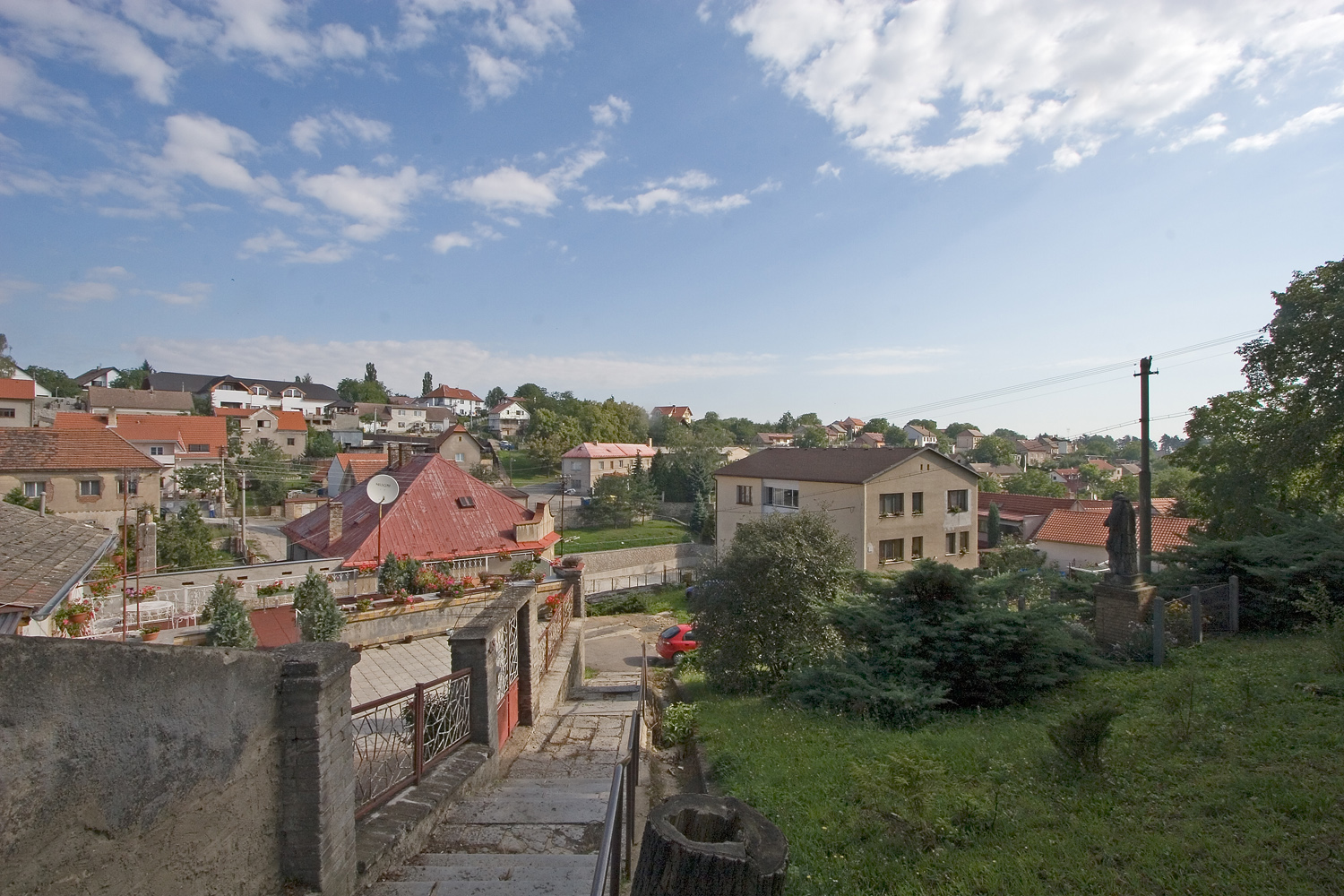
- General view of Kosoř

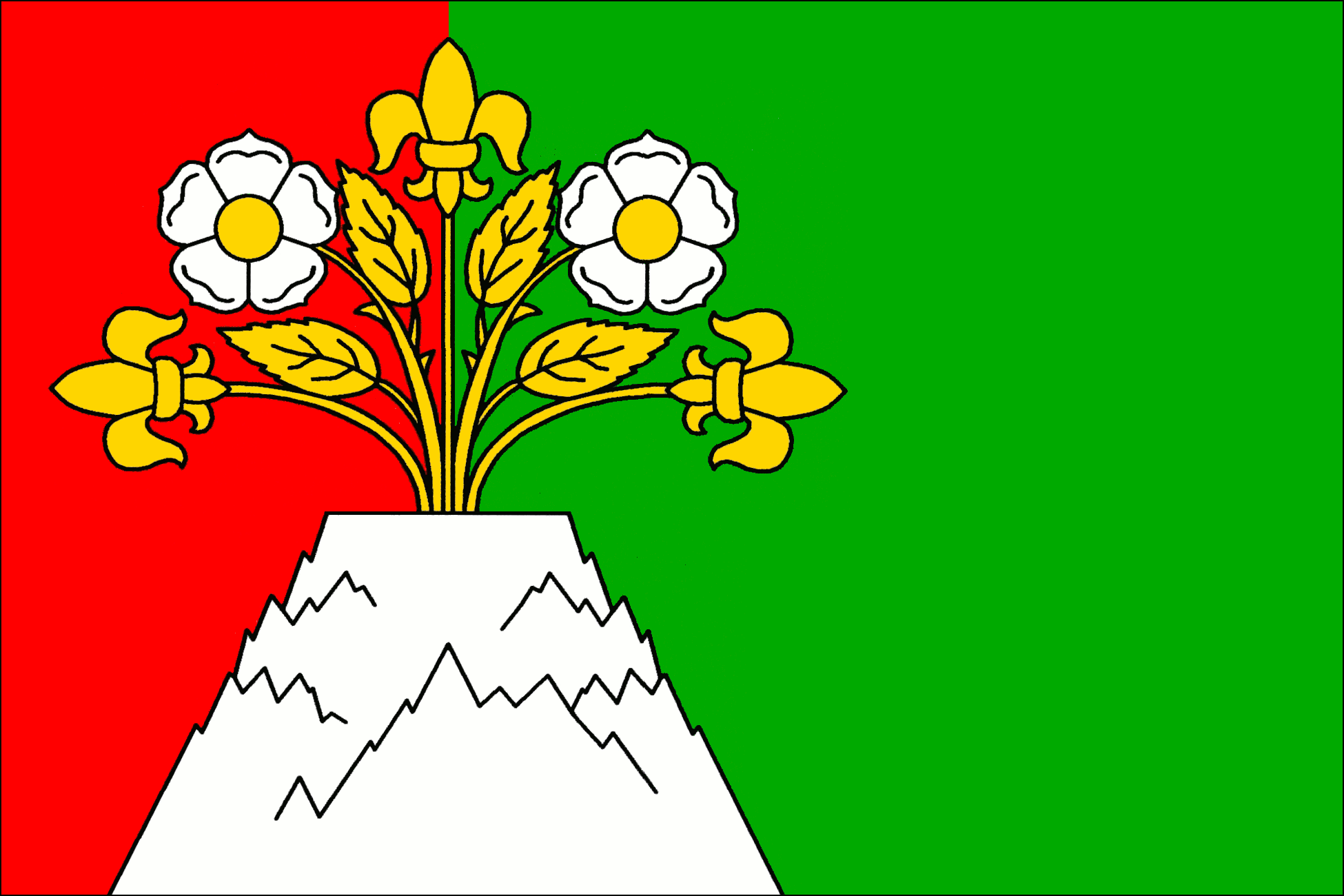
- Flag Coat of arms

- Location in the Czech Republic
- Coordinates: 49°59′15″N 14°19′36″E
- Country: Czech Republic
- Region: Central Bohemian
- District: Prague-West
- First mentioned: 1310

Area
  - Total: 3.89 km^{2} (1.50 sq mi)
- Elevation: 345 m (1,132 ft)

Population (2026-01-01)
  - Total: 864
  - Density: 222/km^{2} (575/sq mi)
- Time zone: UTC+1 (CET)
  - Summer (DST): UTC+2 (CEST)
- Postal code: 252 26
- Website: www.kosor.cz

Kosoř is a municipality and village in Prague-West District in the Central Bohemian Region of the Czech Republic. It has about 900 inhabitants.

== Demographics ==
Historical population
| Year | Pop. | ±% |
|---|---|---|
| 1869 | 392 | — |
| 1880 | 416 | +6.1% |
| 1890 | 538 | +29.3% |
| 1900 | 560 | +4.1% |
| 1910 | 699 | +24.8% |
| 1921 | 595 | −14.9% |
| 1930 | 758 | +27.4% |
| 1950 | 599 | −21.0% |
| 1961 | 675 | +12.7% |
| 1970 | 647 | −4.1% |
| 1980 | 647 | +0.0% |
| 1991 | 611 | −5.6% |
| 2001 | 652 | +6.7% |
| 2011 | 943 | +44.6% |
| 2021 | 913 | −3.2% |
Source: Censuses
