= Choteč (Prague-West District) =

- Municipality
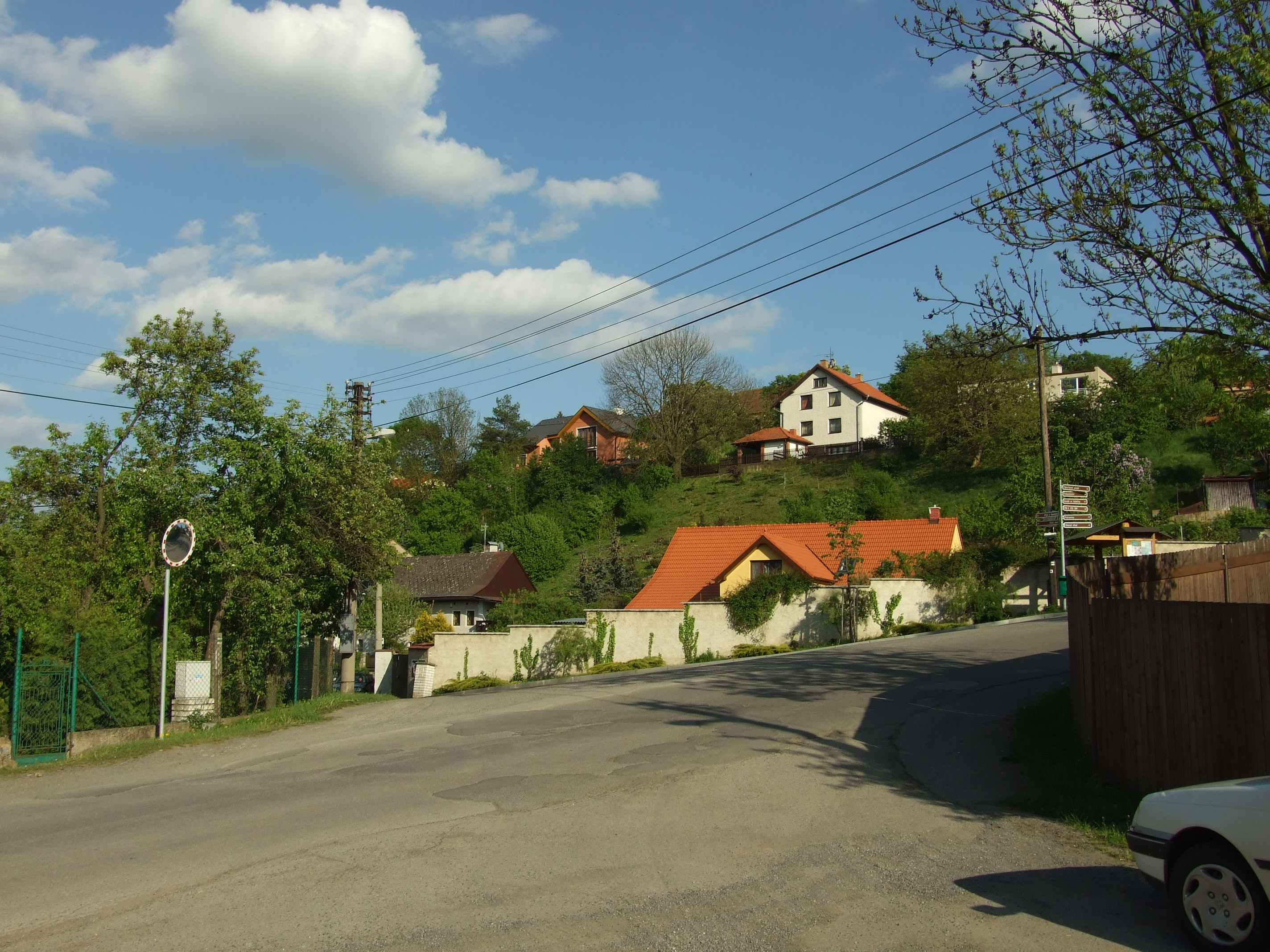
- Centre of Choteč

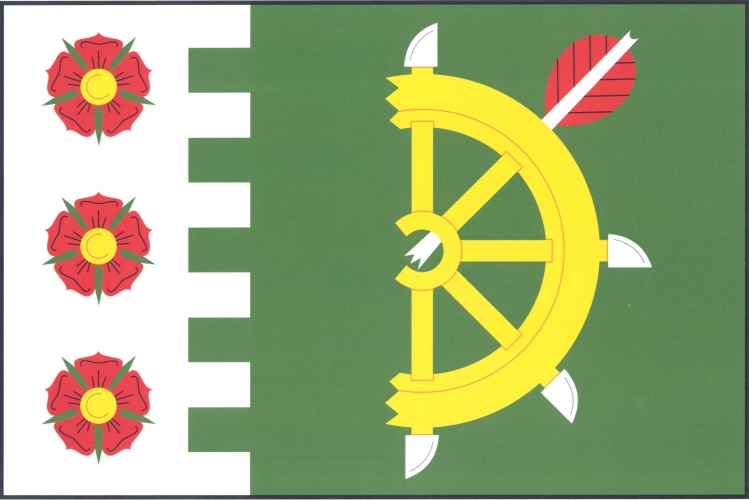
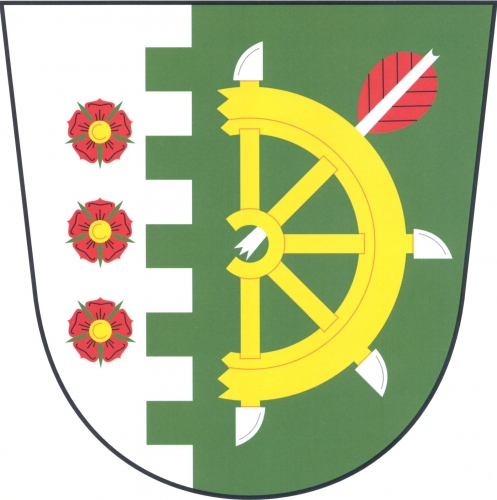
- Flag Coat of arms

- Location in the Czech Republic
- Coordinates: 49°59′12″N 14°16′59″E
- Country: Czech Republic
- Region: Central Bohemian
- District: Prague-West
- First mentioned: 1336

Area
  - Total: 3.70 km^{2} (1.43 sq mi)
- Elevation: 300 m (980 ft)

Population (2026-01-01)
  - Total: 367
  - Density: 99.2/km^{2} (257/sq mi)
- Time zone: UTC+1 (CET)
  - Summer (DST): UTC+2 (CEST)
- Postal code: 252 26
- Website: www.chotecpz.cz

Choteč is a municipality and village in Prague-West District in the Central Bohemian Region of the Czech Republic. It has about 400 inhabitants.

== History ==
The first written mention of the village of Choteč is from 1336. However, a stream and a forest named Choteč were mentioned already in 1115. The village was founded at the beginning of the 14th century.

== Demographics ==
Historical population
Year	Pop.	±%
1869	340	—
1880	352	+3.5%
1890	427	+21.3%
1900	382	−10.5%
1910	384	+0.5%
1921	403	+4.9%
1930	425	+5.5%
1950	332	−21.9%
1961	305	−8.1%
1970	287	−5.9%
1980	272	−5.2%
1991	281	+3.3%
2001	289	+2.8%
2011	378	+30.8%
2021	371	−1.9%
Source: Censuses
