= Buš =

- Municipality
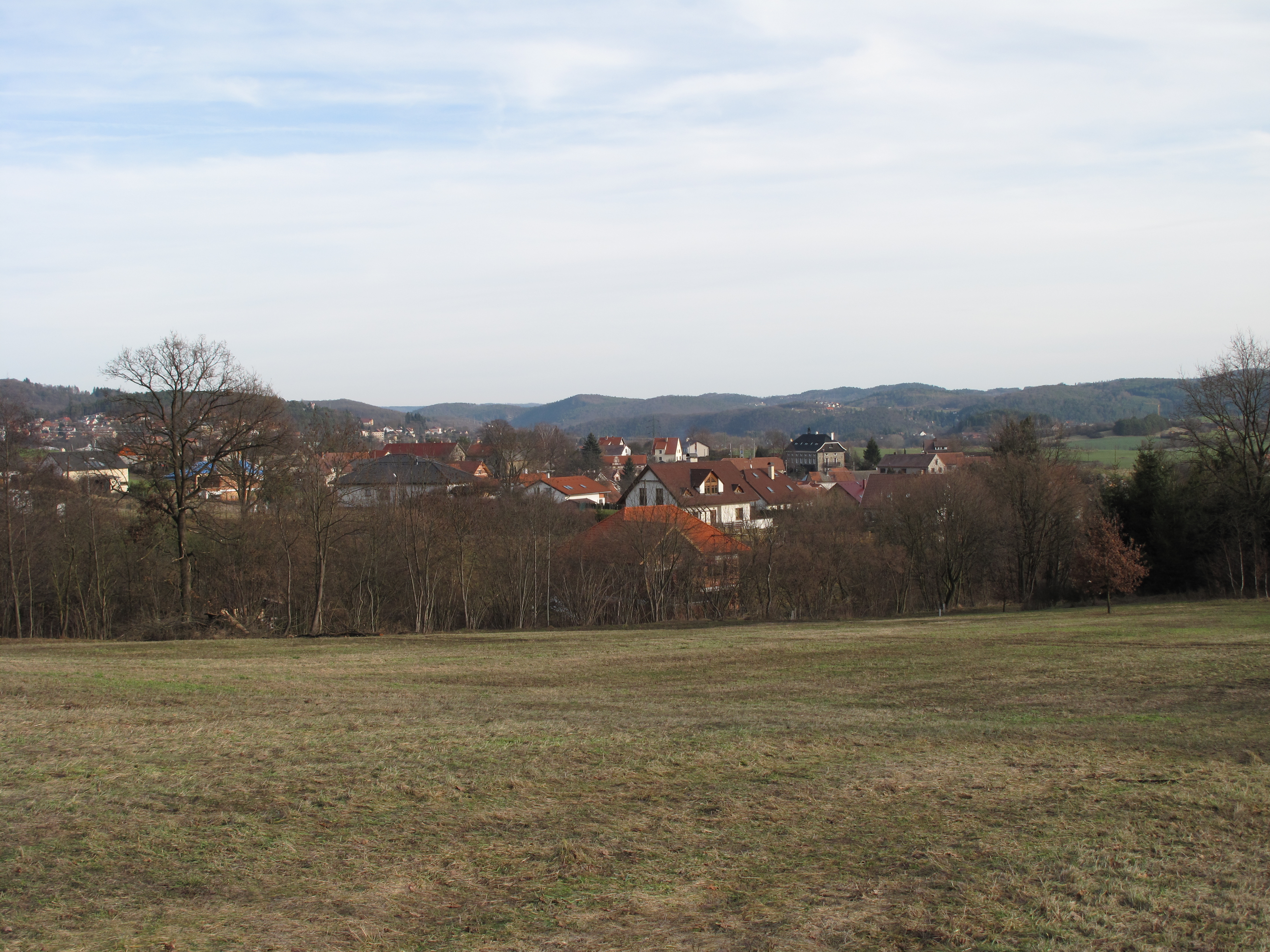
- View from the west

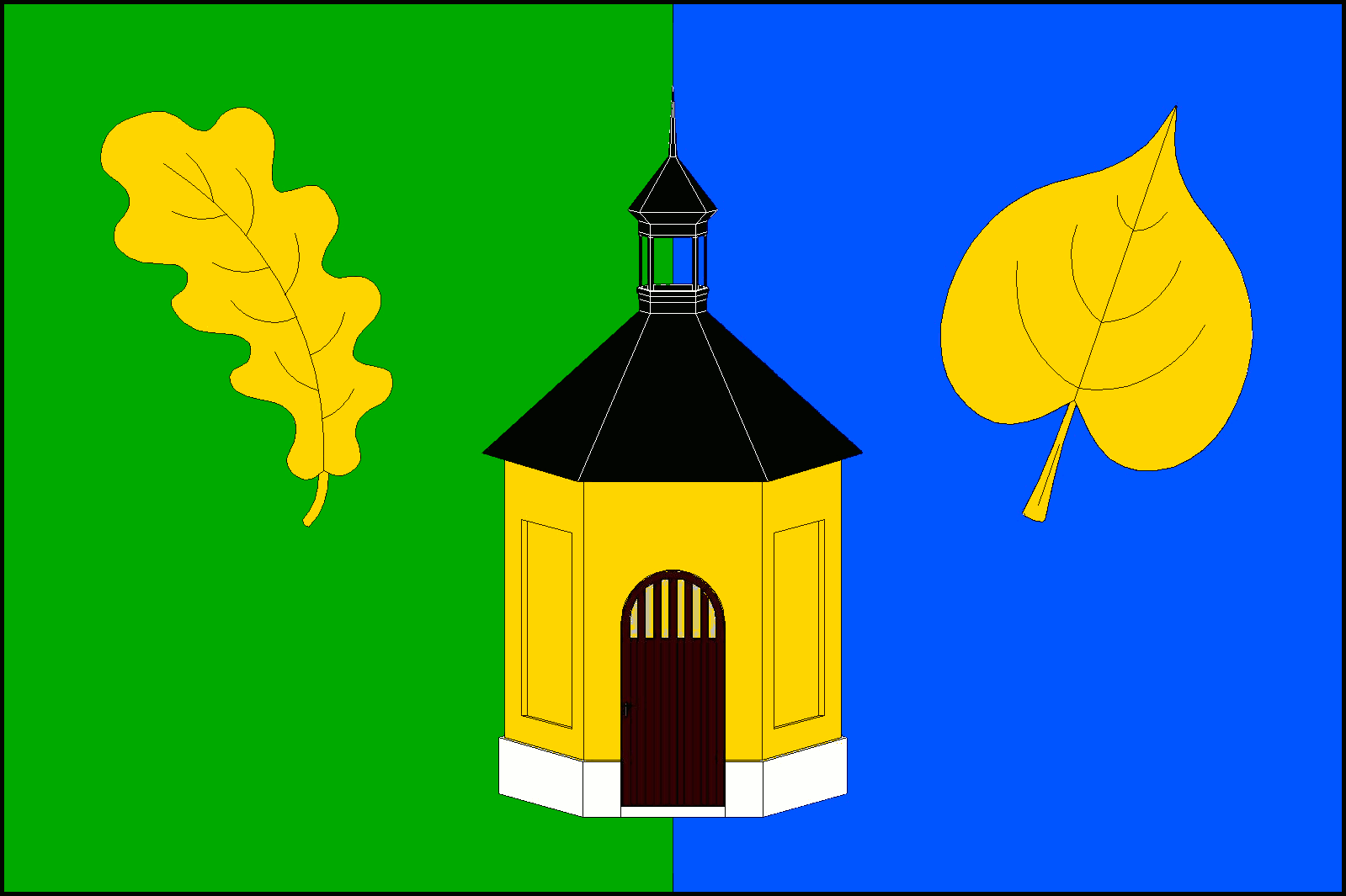
- Flag Coat of arms

- Location in the Czech Republic
- Coordinates: 49°48′12″N 14°23′1″E
- Country: Czech Republic
- Region: Central Bohemian
- District: Prague-West
- First mentioned: 1292

Area
  - Total: 6.85 km^{2} (2.64 sq mi)
- Elevation: 345 m (1,132 ft)

Population (2026-01-01)
  - Total: 339
  - Density: 49.5/km^{2} (128/sq mi)
- Time zone: UTC+1 (CET)
  - Summer (DST): UTC+2 (CEST)
- Postal code: 252 08
- Website: www.obecbus.cz

Buš is a municipality and village in Prague-West District in the Central Bohemian Region of the Czech Republic. It has about 300 inhabitants.

== Demographics ==
Historical population
Year	Pop.	±%
1869	337	—
1880	277	−17.8%
1890	278	+0.4%
1900	294	+5.8%
1910	255	−13.3%
1921	247	−3.1%
1930	234	−5.3%
1950	206	−12.0%
1961	225	+9.2%
1970	186	−17.3%
1980	179	−3.8%
1991	207	+15.6%
2001	210	+1.4%
2011	309	+47.1%
2021	347	+12.3%
Source: Censuses
