= Libeř =

- Municipality
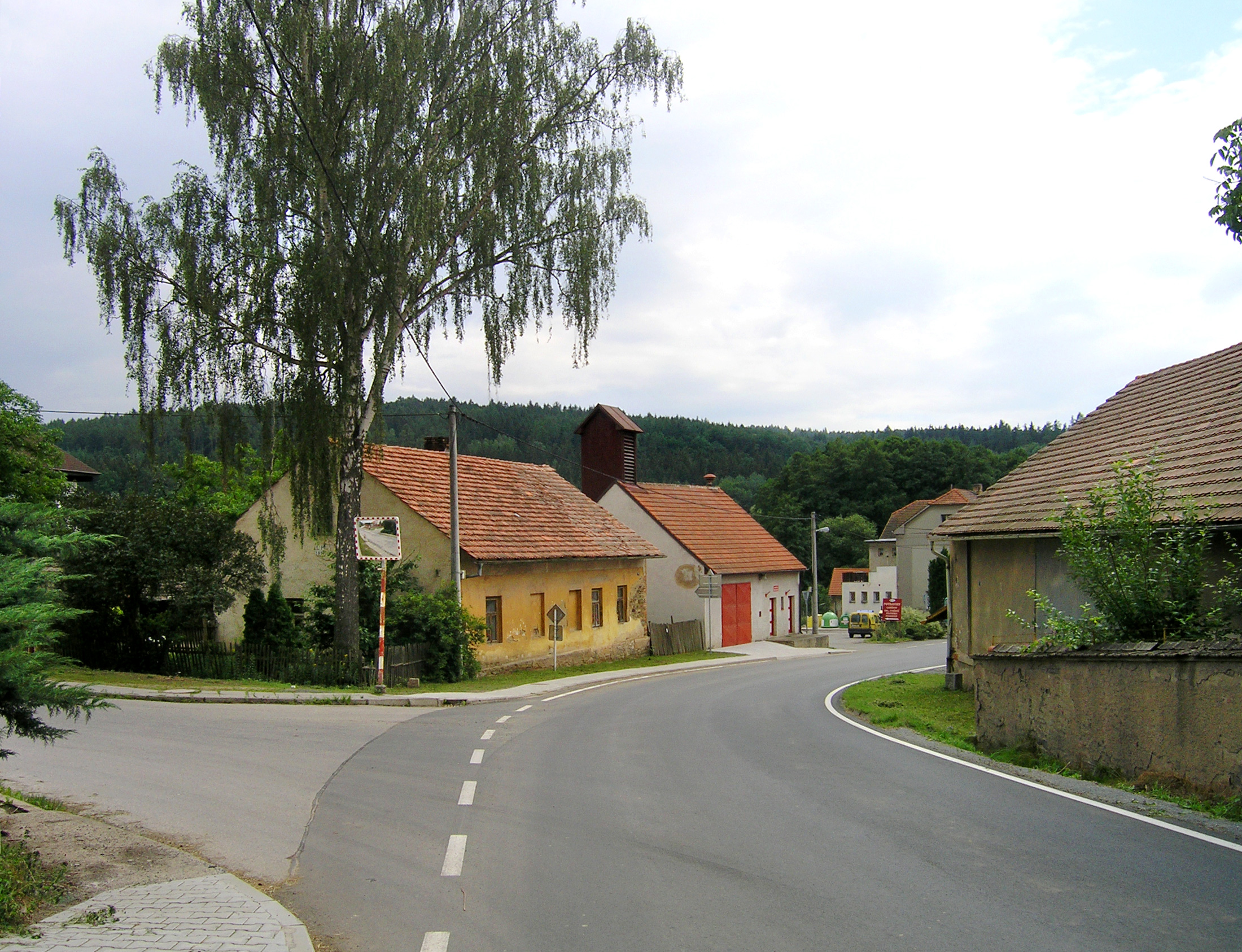
- Centre of Libeř

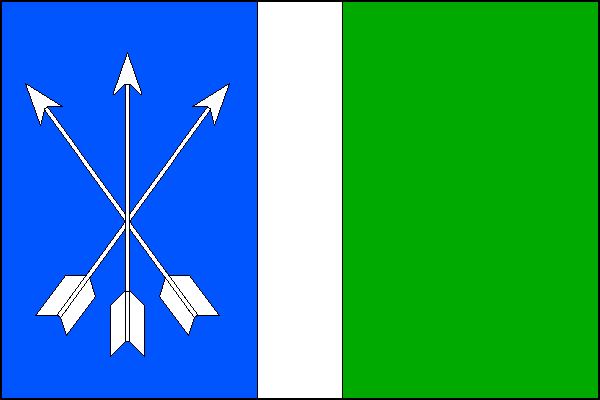
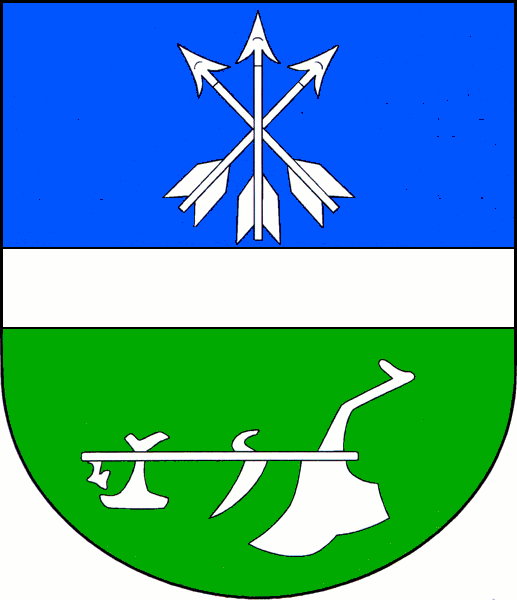
- Flag Coat of arms

- Location in the Czech Republic
- Coordinates: 49°55′27″N 14°28′50″E
- Country: Czech Republic
- Region: Central Bohemian
- District: Prague-West
- First mentioned: 1320

Area
  - Total: 13.62 km^{2} (5.26 sq mi)
- Elevation: 302 m (991 ft)

Population (2026-01-01)
  - Total: 1,655
  - Density: 121.5/km^{2} (314.7/sq mi)
- Time zone: UTC+1 (CET)
  - Summer (DST): UTC+2 (CEST)
- Postal code: 252 45
- Website: www.liber.cz

Libeř is a municipality and village in Prague-West District in the Central Bohemian Region of the Czech Republic. It has about 1,700 inhabitants.

== Administrative division ==
Libeř consists of two municipal parts (in brackets population according to the 2021 census):

- Libeř (910)
- Libeň (683)

== Demographics ==
Historical population
Year	Pop.	±%
1869	534	—
1880	525	−1.7%
1890	553	+5.3%
1900	537	−2.9%
1910	545	+1.5%
1921	539	−1.1%
1930	543	+0.7%
1950	508	−6.4%
1961	521	+2.6%
1970	501	−3.8%
1980	511	+2.0%
1991	571	+11.7%
2001	685	+20.0%
2011	1,240	+81.0%
2021	1,593	+28.5%
Source: Censuses
