= Bratřínov =

- Municipality
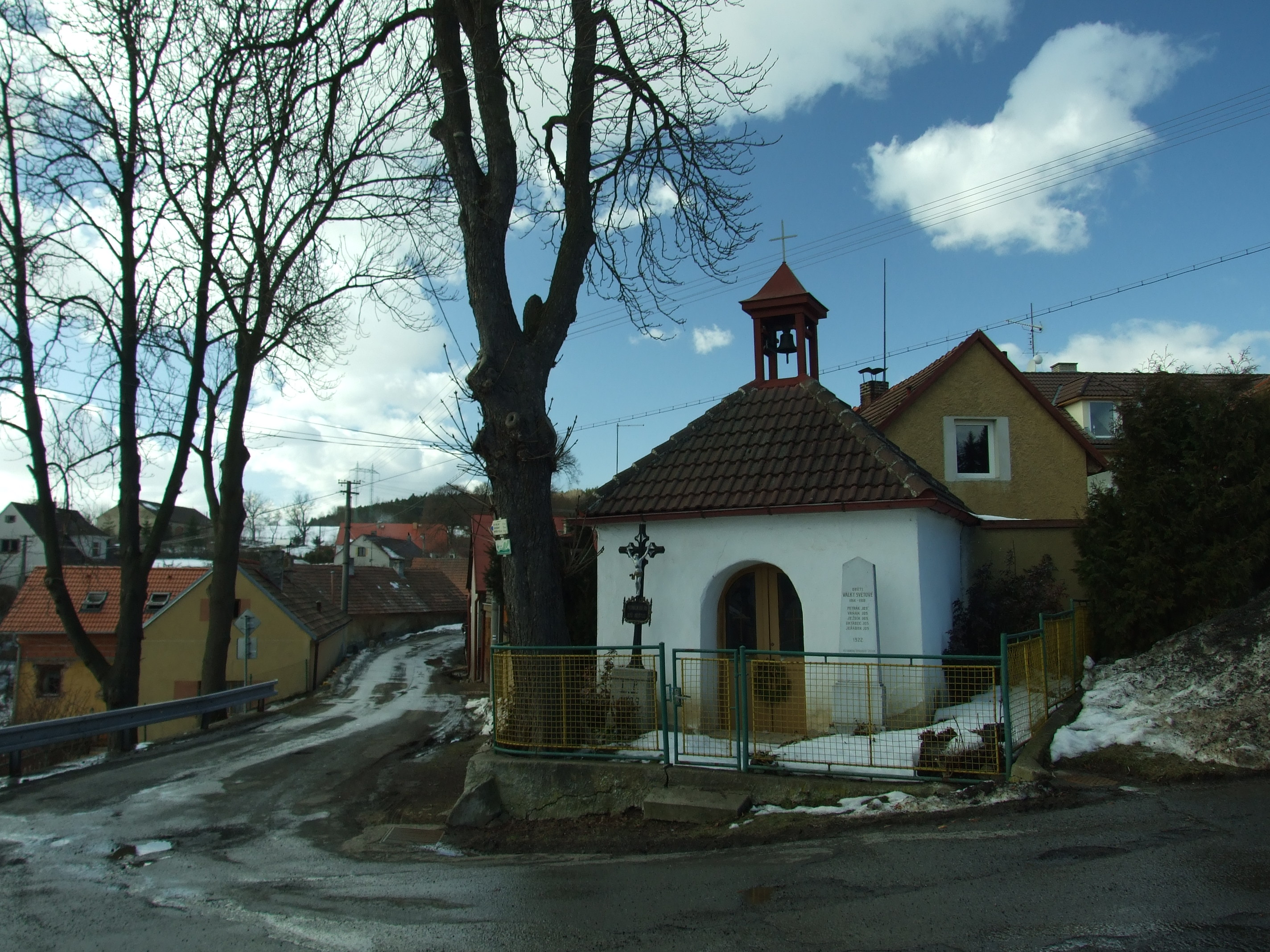
- Chapel in Bratřínov

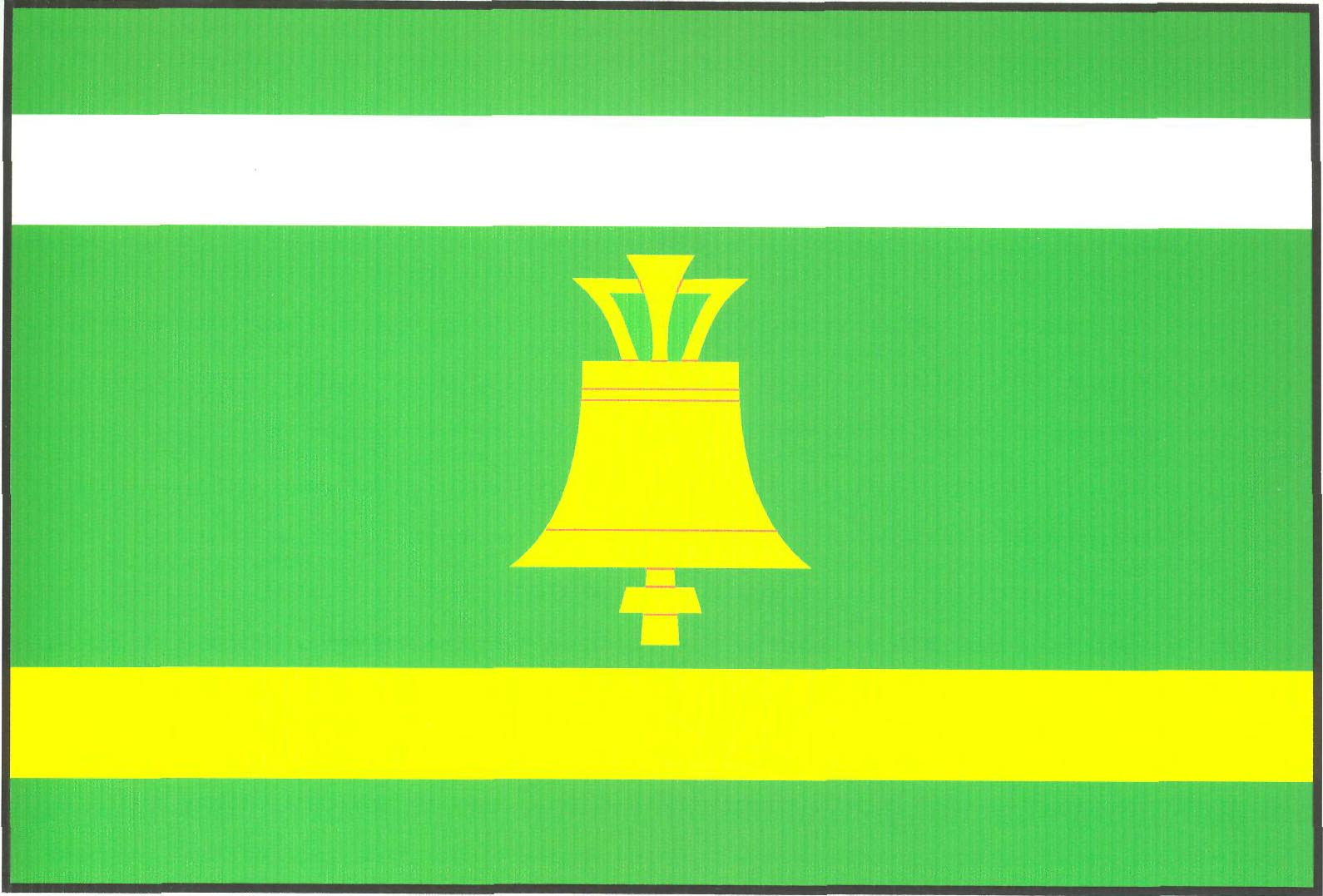
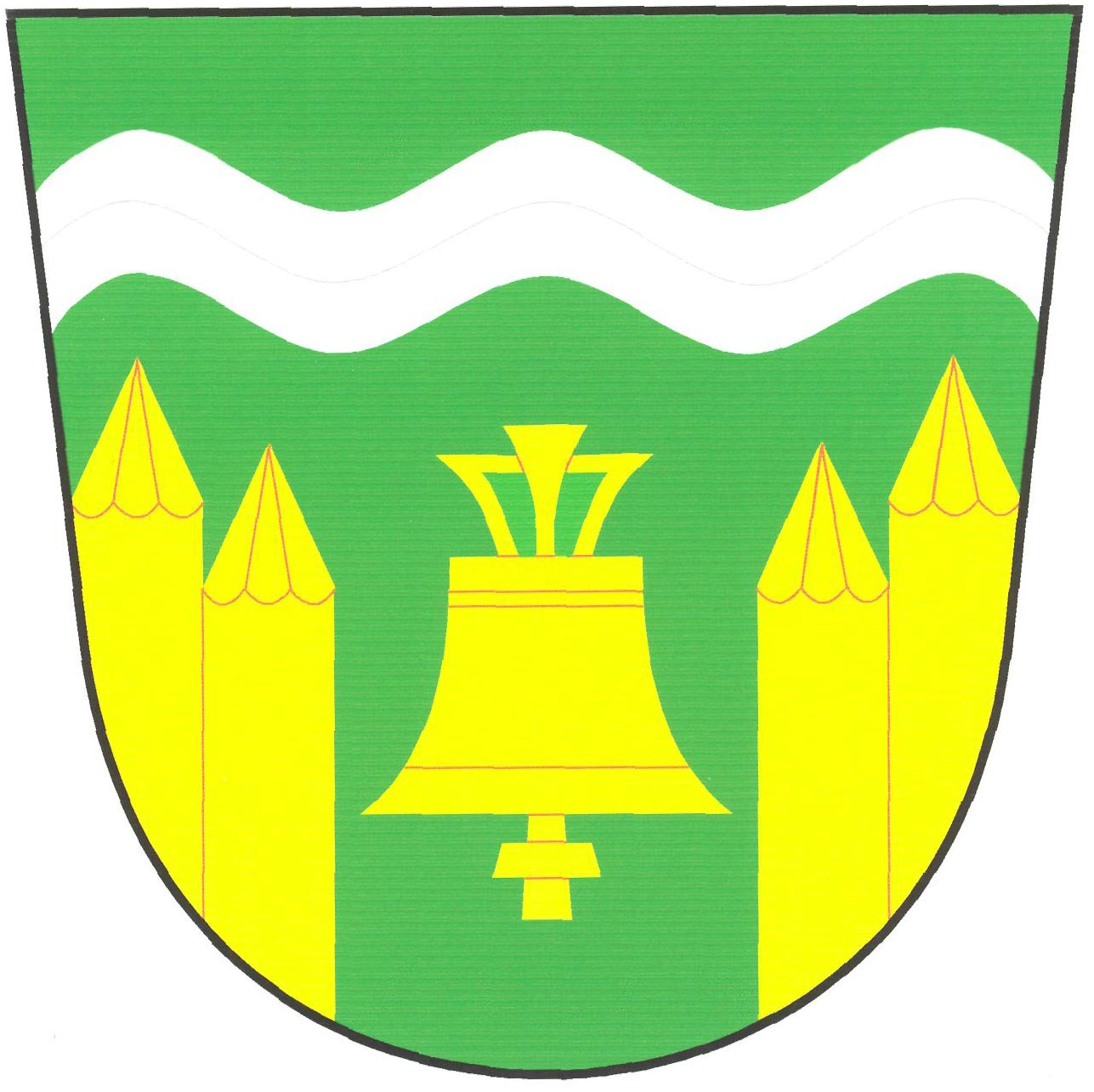
- Flag Coat of arms

- Location in the Czech Republic
- Coordinates: 49°50′34″N 14°20′25″E
- Country: Czech Republic
- Region: Central Bohemian
- District: Prague-West
- First mentioned: 1100

Area
  - Total: 4.21 km^{2} (1.63 sq mi)
- Elevation: 325 m (1,066 ft)

Population (2026-01-01)
  - Total: 211
  - Density: 50.1/km^{2} (130/sq mi)
- Time zone: UTC+1 (CET)
  - Summer (DST): UTC+2 (CEST)
- Postal code: 252 05
- Website: www.bratrinov.cz

Bratřínov is a municipality and village in Prague-West District in the Central Bohemian Region of the Czech Republic. It has about 200 inhabitants.

== History ==
The first written mention of Bratřínov is from 1100.

== Demographics ==
Historical population
| Year | Pop. | ±% |
|---|---|---|
| 1869 | 200 | — |
| 1880 | 197 | −1.5% |
| 1890 | 217 | +10.2% |
| 1900 | 196 | −9.7% |
| 1910 | 196 | +0.0% |
| 1921 | 169 | −13.8% |
| 1930 | 186 | +10.1% |
| 1950 | 132 | −29.0% |
| 1961 | 145 | +9.8% |
| 1970 | 118 | −18.6% |
| 1980 | 100 | −15.3% |
| 1991 | 91 | −9.0% |
| 2001 | 108 | +18.7% |
| 2011 | 189 | +75.0% |
| 2021 | 217 | +14.8% |
Source: Censuses
