= Líšnice (Prague-West District) =

- Municipality
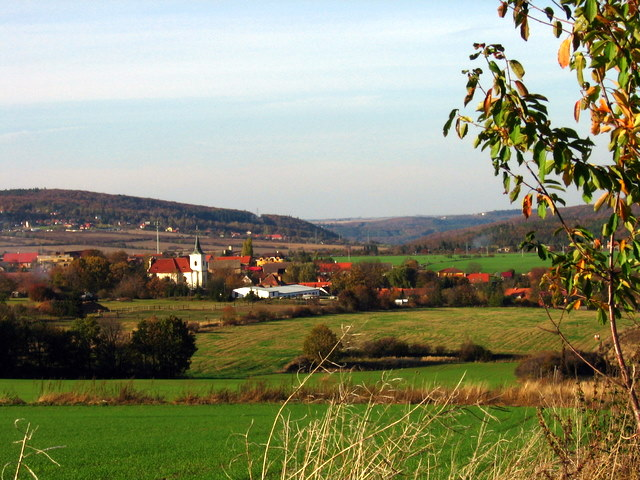
- View towards Líšnice

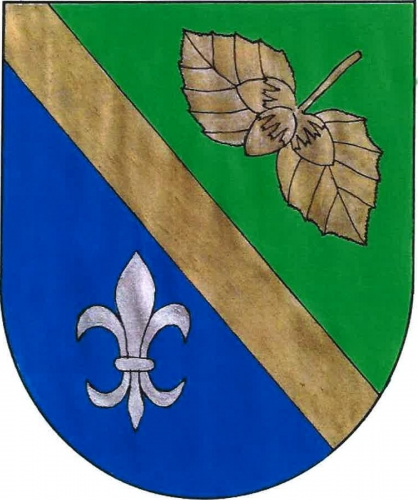
- Flag Coat of arms

- Location in the Czech Republic
- Coordinates: 49°53′20″N 14°19′8″E
- Country: Czech Republic
- Region: Central Bohemian
- District: Prague-West
- First mentioned: 1337

Area
  - Total: 7.40 km^{2} (2.86 sq mi)
- Elevation: 359 m (1,178 ft)

Population (2026-01-01)
  - Total: 798
  - Density: 108/km^{2} (279/sq mi)
- Time zone: UTC+1 (CET)
  - Summer (DST): UTC+2 (CEST)
- Postal code: 252 03
- Website: www.obeclisnice.eu

Líšnice is a municipality and village in Prague-West District in the Central Bohemian Region of the Czech Republic. It has about 800 inhabitants.

== Demographics ==
Historical population
Year	Pop.	±%
1869	487	—
1880	503	+3.3%
1890	490	−2.6%
1900	492	+0.4%
1910	450	−8.5%
1921	393	−12.7%
1930	364	−7.4%
1950	306	−15.9%
1961	351	+14.7%
1970	355	+1.1%
1980	319	−10.1%
1991	284	−11.0%
2001	347	+22.2%
2011	621	+79.0%
2021	853	+37.4%
Source: Censuses
