= Hostin =

Hostin (also spelled Ostyn, Hostyn and Ostjin) may refer to:

== Czech Republic ==
- Hostín, a village and municipality in the Central Bohemian Region
- Hostín u Vojkovic, a village and municipality in the Central Bohemian Region
- Hostýn, a hill in Moravia
- Hostýn-Vsetín Mountains, a mountain range

== Other places ==
- Hostyn, Texas, United States

== People with the surname Hostin ==
- Louis Hostin (1908–1998), French weightlifter
- Sunny Hostin (born 1968), American lawyer, journalist, and social commentator
