= Dolní Zimoř =

- Municipality
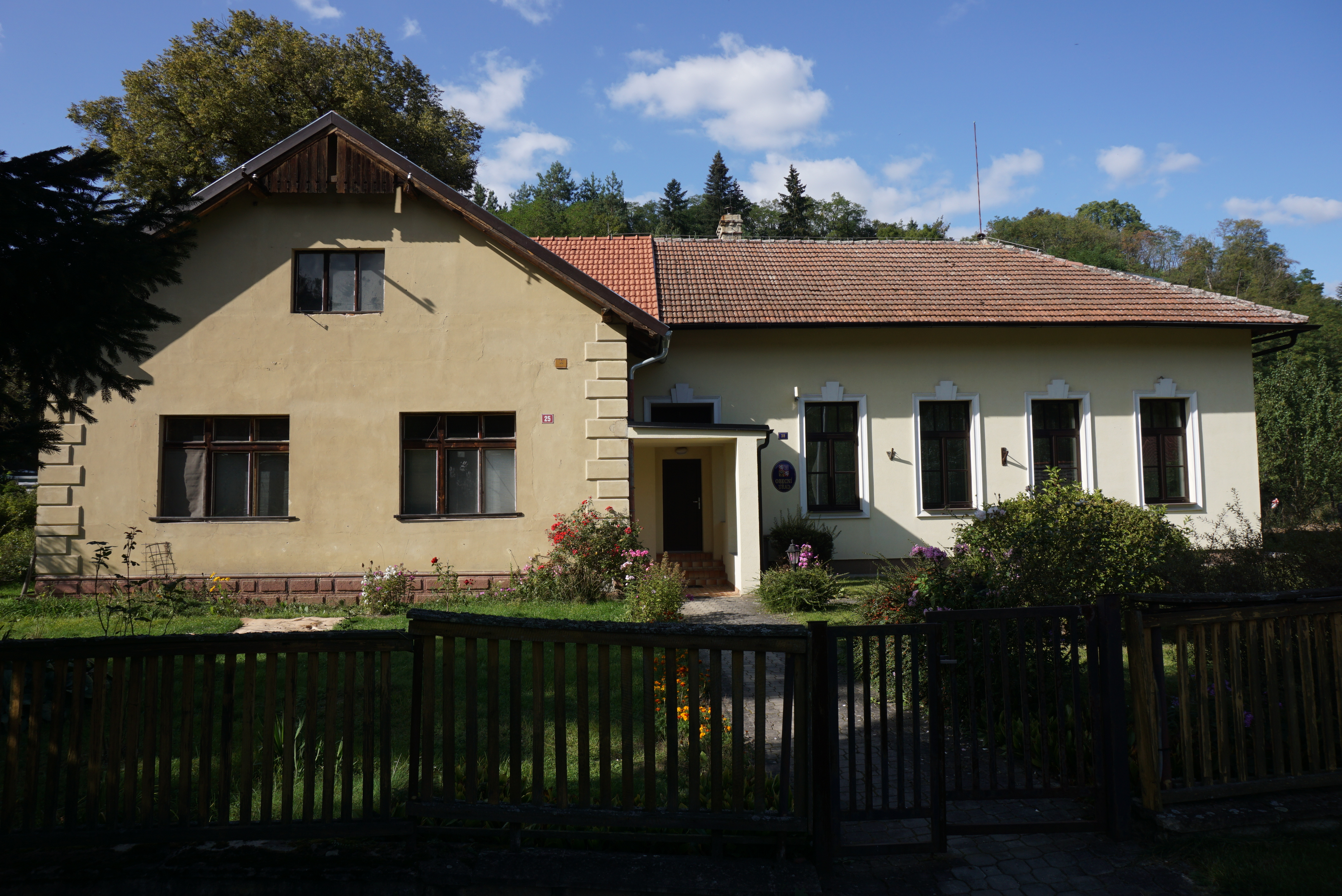
- Municipal office

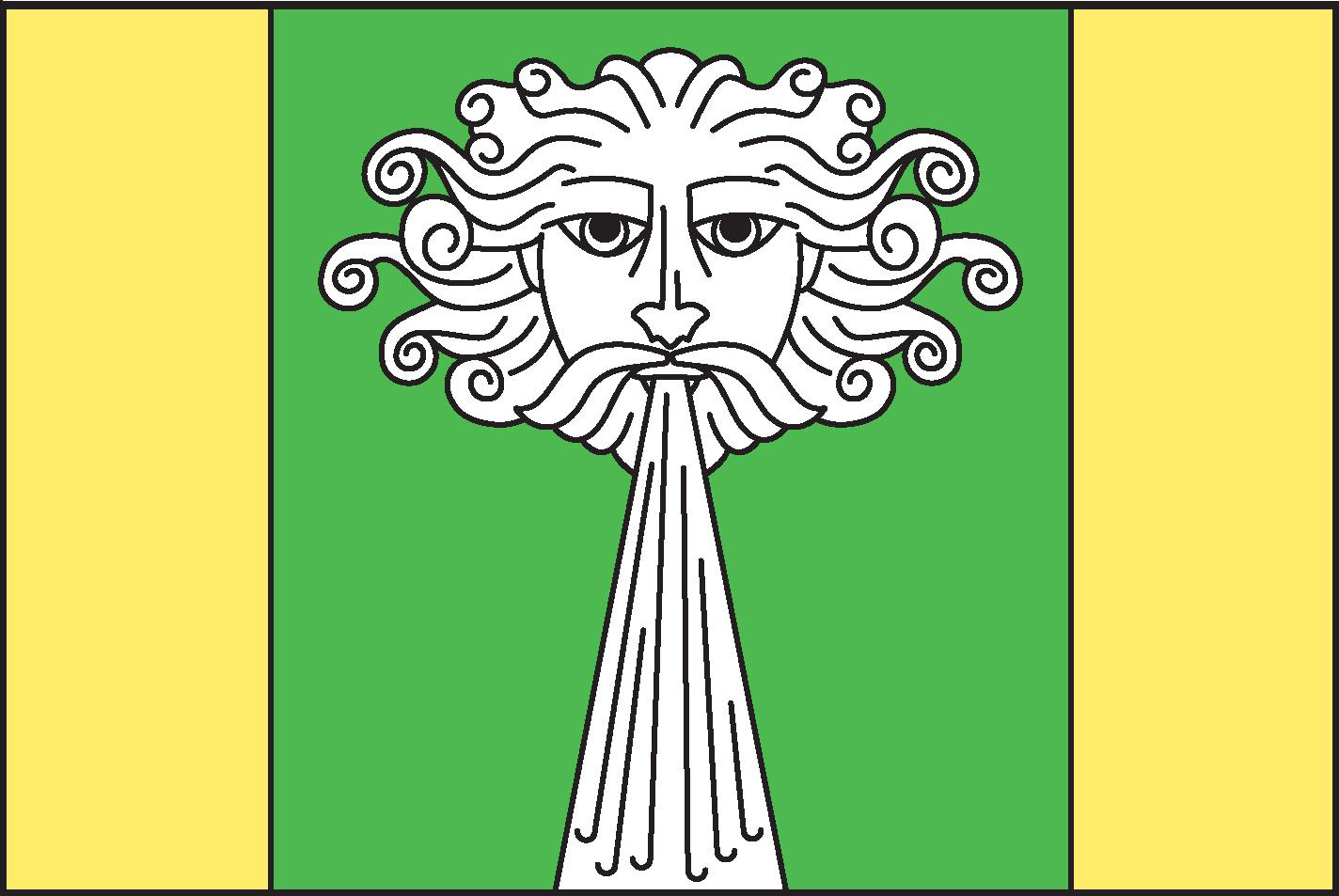
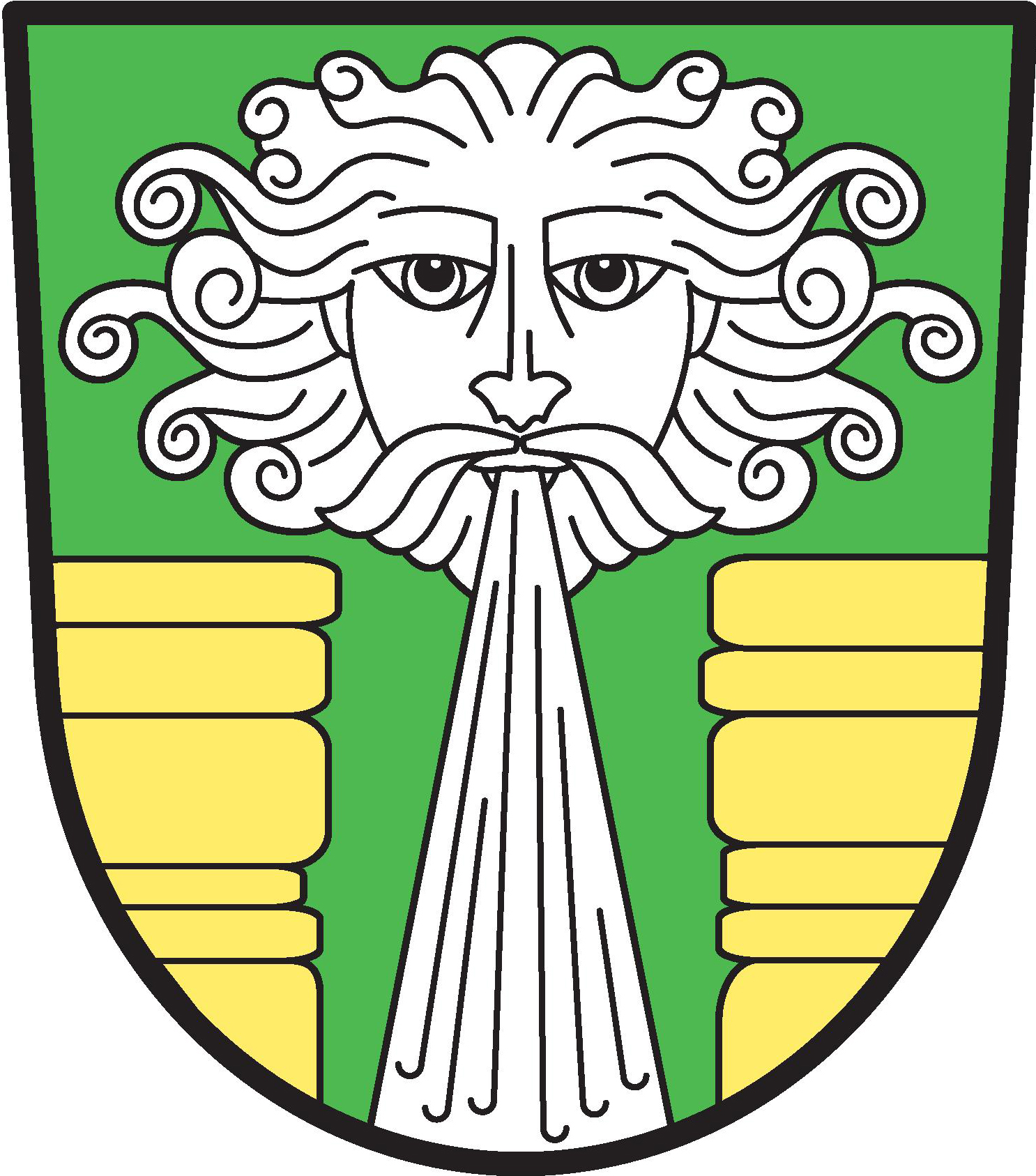
- Flag Coat of arms

- Location in the Czech Republic
- Coordinates: 50°25′36″N 14°30′5″E
- Country: Czech Republic
- Region: Central Bohemian
- District: Mělník
- First mentioned: 1640

Area
  - Total: 1.61 km^{2} (0.62 sq mi)
- Elevation: 200 m (660 ft)

Population (2026-01-01)
  - Total: 103
  - Density: 64.0/km^{2} (166/sq mi)
- Time zone: UTC+1 (CET)
  - Summer (DST): UTC+2 (CEST)
- Postal code: 277 21
- Website: www.dolnizimor.cz

Dolní Zimoř is a municipality and village in Mělník District in the Central Bohemian Region of the Czech Republic. It has about 100 inhabitants.

== Demographics ==
Historical population
Year	Pop.	±%
1869	167	—
1880	178	+6.6%
1890	167	−6.2%
1900	146	−12.6%
1910	144	−1.4%
1921	132	−8.3%
1930	109	−17.4%
1950	80	−26.6%
1961	93	+16.3%
1970	85	−8.6%
1980	74	−12.9%
1991	72	−2.7%
2001	64	−11.1%
2011	68	+6.2%
2021	96	+41.2%
Source: Censuses
