= Újezdec (Mělník District) =

- Municipality
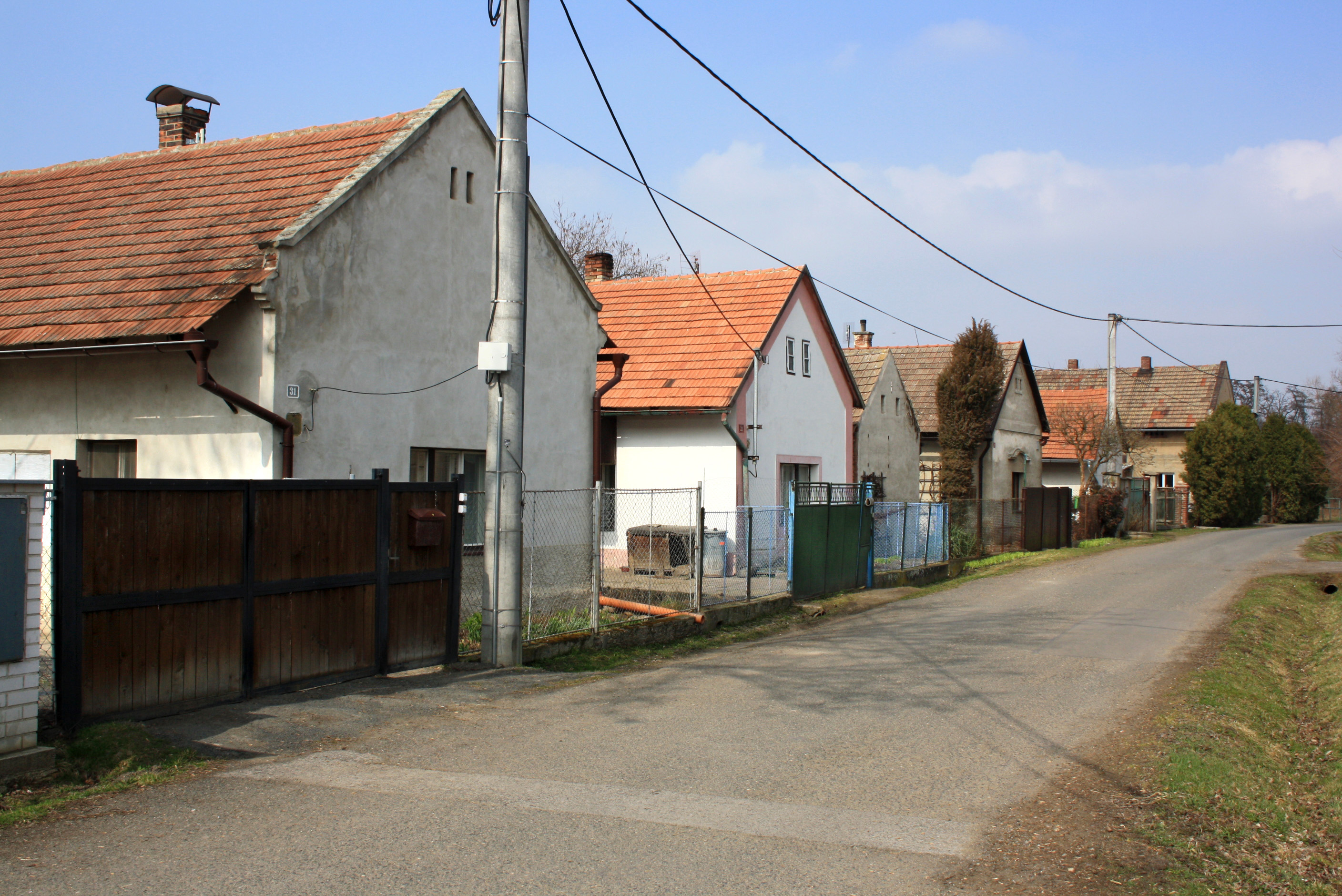
- Western part of Újezdec

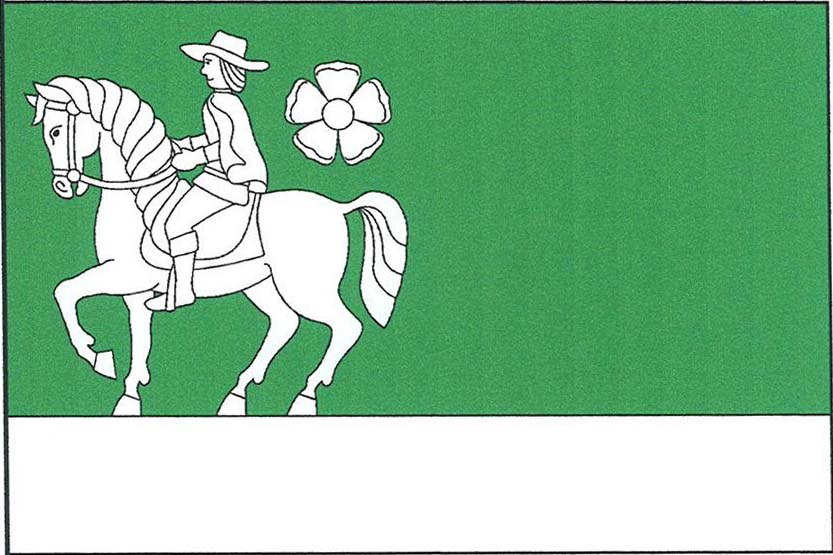
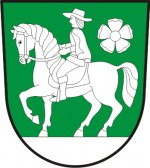
- Flag Coat of arms

- Location in the Czech Republic
- Coordinates: 50°17′0″N 14°25′15″E
- Country: Czech Republic
- Region: Central Bohemian
- District: Mělník
- First mentioned: 1380

Area
  - Total: 2.37 km^{2} (0.92 sq mi)
- Elevation: 173 m (568 ft)

Population (2026-01-01)
  - Total: 141
  - Density: 59.5/km^{2} (154/sq mi)
- Time zone: UTC+1 (CET)
  - Summer (DST): UTC+2 (CEST)
- Postal code: 277 45
- Website: www.obecujezdec.eud.cz

Újezdec is a municipality and village in Mělník District in the Central Bohemian Region of the Czech Republic. It has about 100 inhabitants.

== History ==
The first written mention of Újezdec is from 1380.

== Demographics ==
Historical population
| Year | Pop. | ±% |
|---|---|---|
| 1869 | 180 | — |
| 1880 | 203 | +12.8% |
| 1890 | 201 | −1.0% |
| 1900 | 202 | +0.5% |
| 1910 | 184 | −8.9% |
| 1921 | 209 | +13.6% |
| 1930 | 214 | +2.4% |
| 1950 | 160 | −25.2% |
| 1961 | 135 | −15.6% |
| 1970 | 117 | −13.3% |
| 1980 | 107 | −8.5% |
| 1991 | 103 | −3.7% |
| 2001 | 97 | −5.8% |
| 2011 | 105 | +8.2% |
| 2021 | 129 | +22.9% |
Source: Censuses
