= Medonosy =

- Municipality
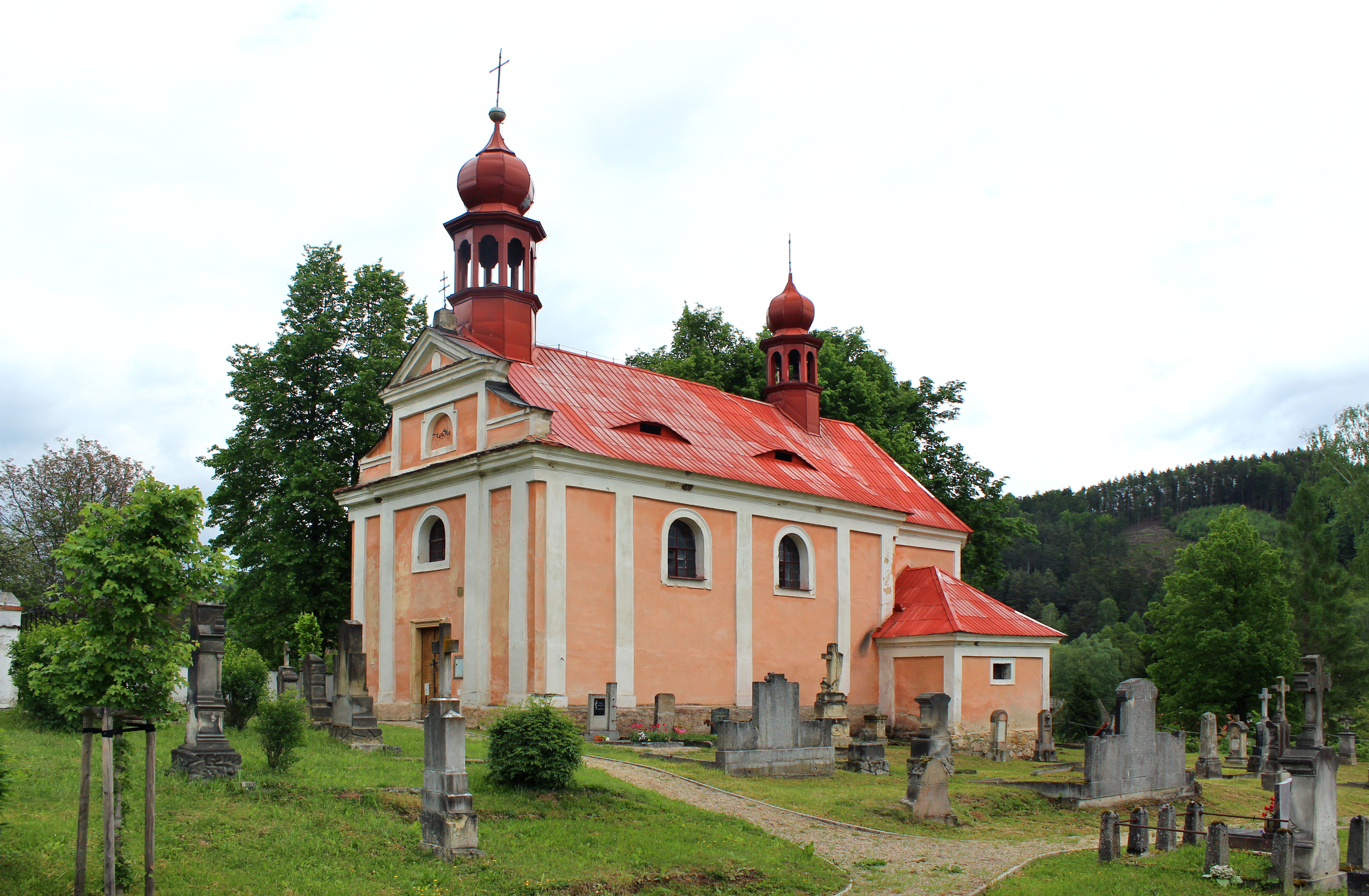
- Church of Saint James the Great

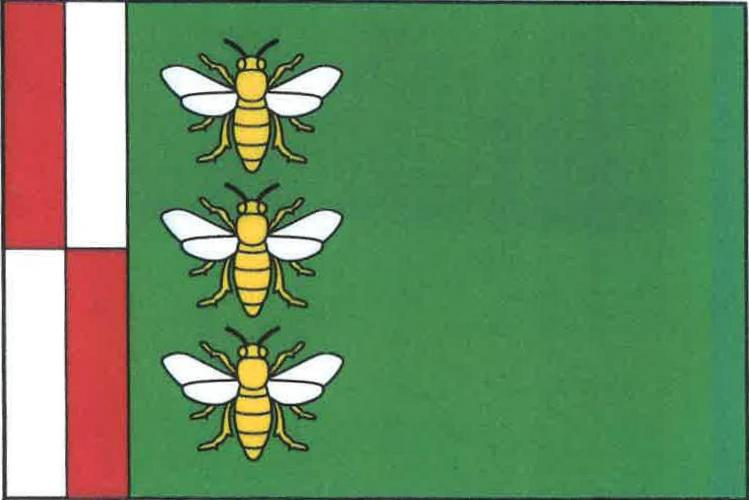
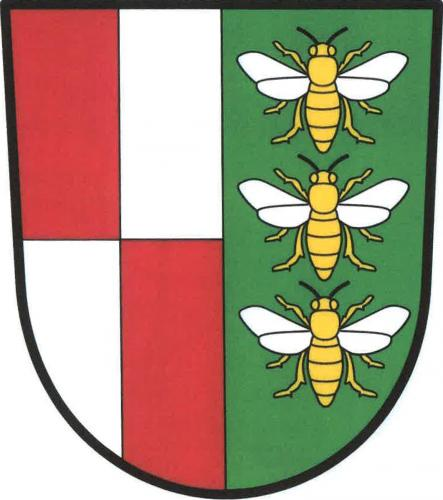
- Flag Coat of arms

- Location in the Czech Republic
- Coordinates: 50°29′39″N 14°29′13″E
- Country: Czech Republic
- Region: Central Bohemian
- District: Mělník
- First mentioned: 1352

Area
  - Total: 14.88 km^{2} (5.75 sq mi)
- Elevation: 219 m (719 ft)

Population (2026-01-01)
  - Total: 157
  - Density: 10.6/km^{2} (27.3/sq mi)
- Time zone: UTC+1 (CET)
  - Summer (DST): UTC+2 (CEST)
- Postal code: 277 21
- Website: www.obecmedonosy.cz

Medonosy (German: Medonost) is a municipality and village in Mělník District in the Central Bohemian Region of the Czech Republic. It has about 200 inhabitants. The village of Nové Osinalice within the municipality has well preserved examples of folk architecture and is protected as a village monument reservation.

== Administrative division ==
Medonosy consists of five municipal parts (in brackets population according to the 2021 census):

- Medonosy (77)
- Chudolazy (43)
- Nové Osinalice (13)
- Osinalice (30)
- Osinaličky (2)

== History ==
The first written mention of Medonosy is from 1352.

== Demographics ==
Historical population
Year	Pop.	±%
1869	951	—
1880	914	−3.9%
1890	768	−16.0%
1900	697	−9.2%
1910	621	−10.9%
1921	643	+3.5%
1930	628	−2.3%
1950	218	−65.3%
1961	214	−1.8%
1970	209	−2.3%
1980	108	−48.3%
1991	87	−19.4%
2001	108	+24.1%
2011	117	+8.3%
2021	165	+41.0%
Source: Censuses
