= Olovnice =

- Municipality
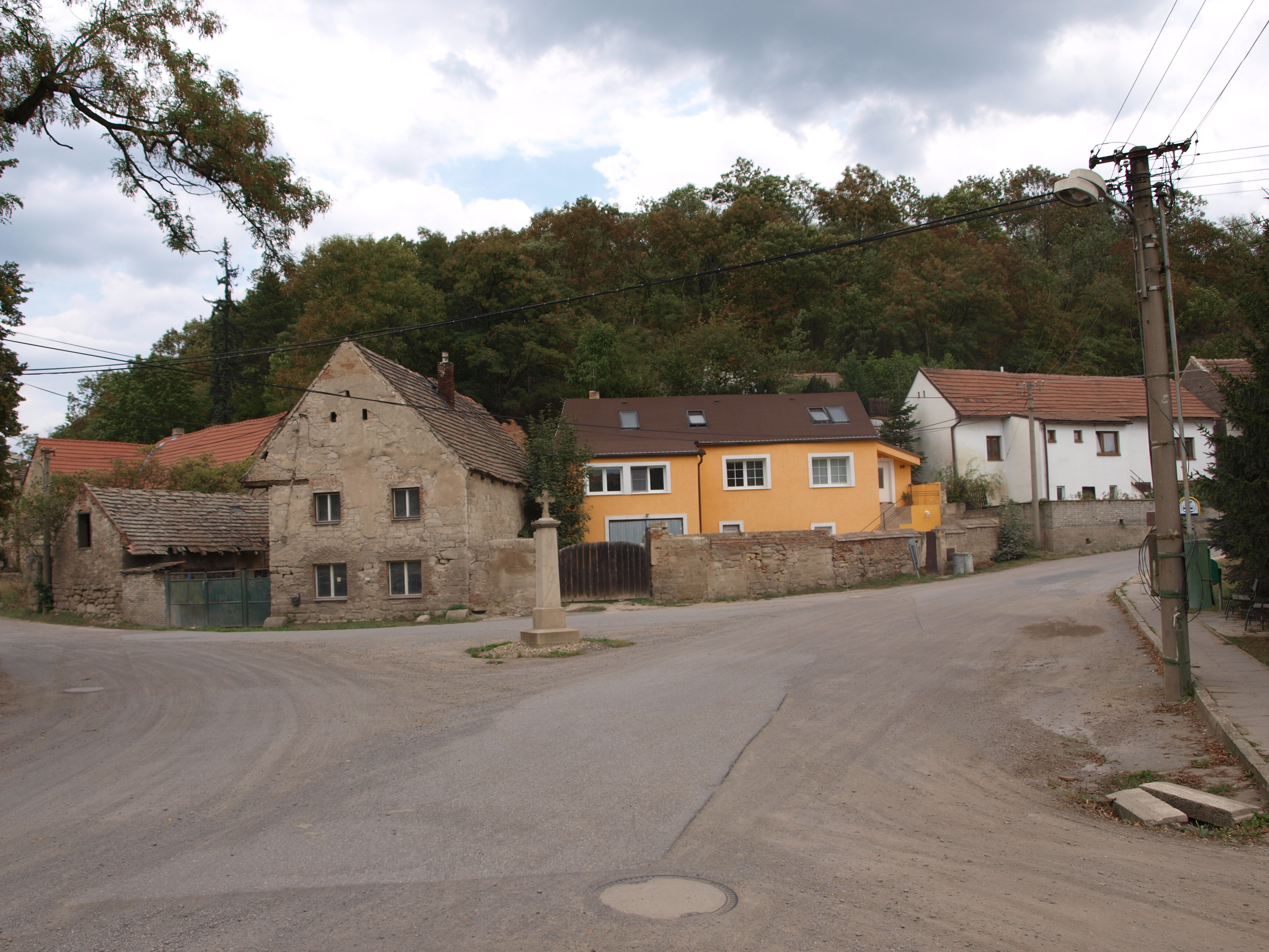
- Crossroads

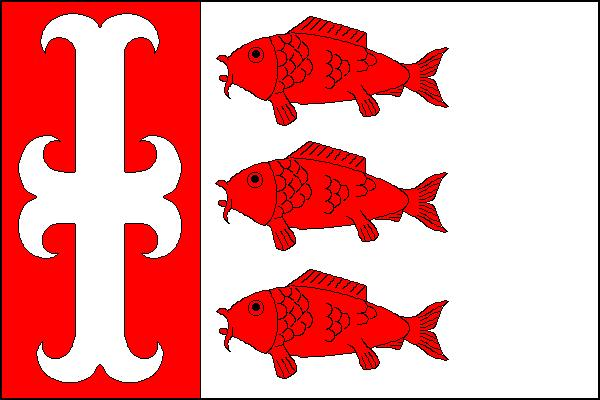
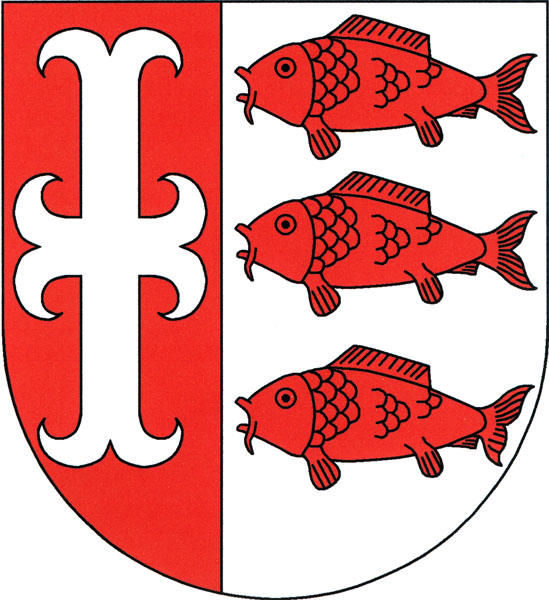
- Flag Coat of arms

- Location in the Czech Republic
- Coordinates: 50°14′5″N 14°14′26″E
- Country: Czech Republic
- Region: Central Bohemian
- District: Mělník
- First mentioned: 1285

Area
  - Total: 5.88 km^{2} (2.27 sq mi)
- Elevation: 193 m (633 ft)

Population (2026-01-01)
  - Total: 580
  - Density: 99/km^{2} (260/sq mi)
- Time zone: UTC+1 (CET)
  - Summer (DST): UTC+2 (CEST)
- Postal code: 278 01
- Website: www.olovnice.cz

Olovnice is a municipality and village in Mělník District in the Central Bohemian Region of the Czech Republic. It has about 600 inhabitants.

== Demographics ==
Historical population
| Year | Pop. | ±% |
|---|---|---|
| 1869 | 603 | — |
| 1880 | 647 | +7.3% |
| 1890 | 685 | +5.9% |
| 1900 | 769 | +12.3% |
| 1910 | 802 | +4.3% |
| 1921 | 663 | −17.3% |
| 1930 | 687 | +3.6% |
| 1950 | 639 | −7.0% |
| 1961 | 675 | +5.6% |
| 1970 | 655 | −3.0% |
| 1980 | 547 | −16.5% |
| 1991 | 389 | −28.9% |
| 2001 | 435 | +11.8% |
| 2011 | 484 | +11.3% |
| 2021 | 562 | +16.1% |
Source: Censuses
