= Ledčice =

- Municipality
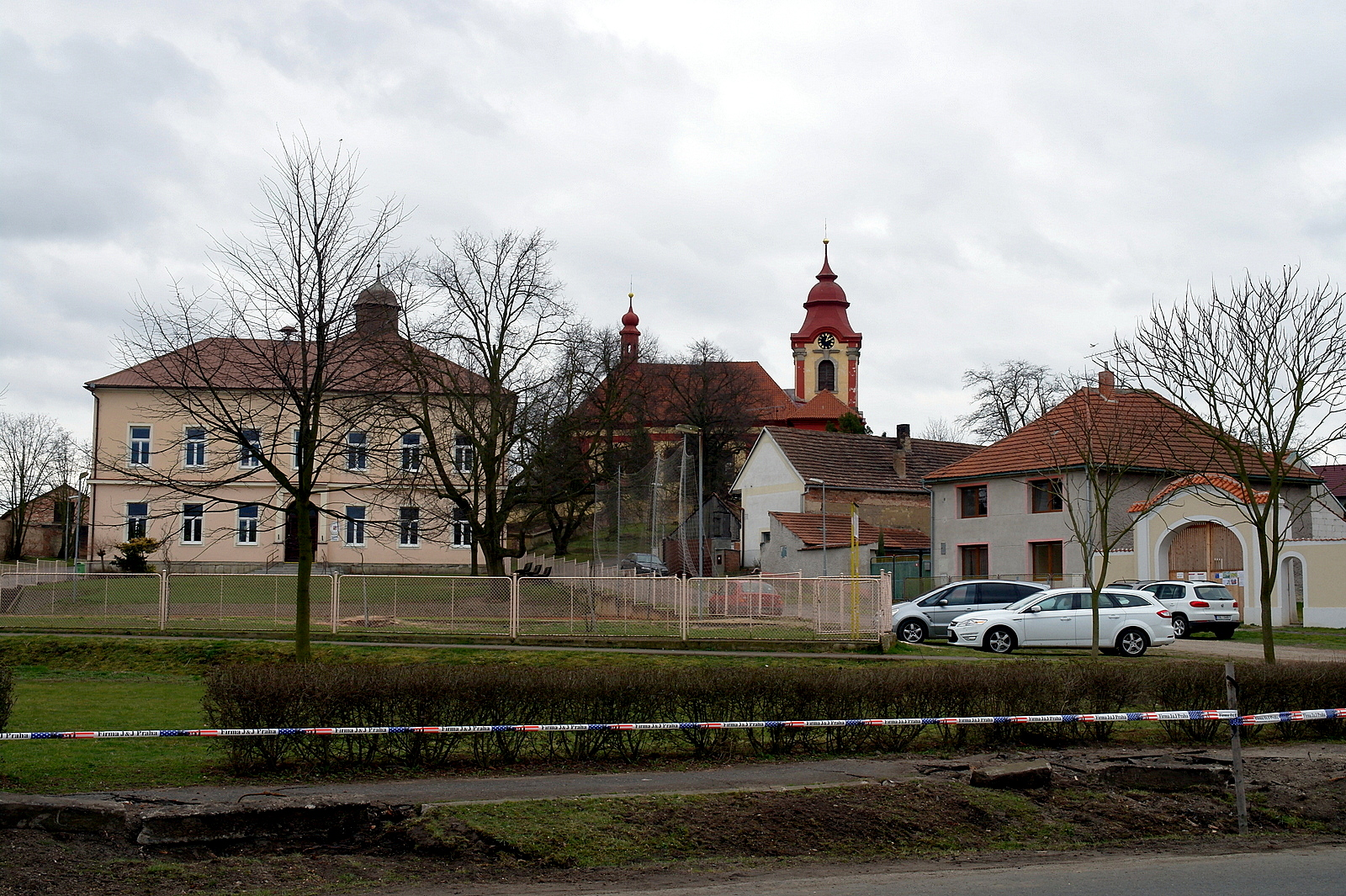
- View from the north

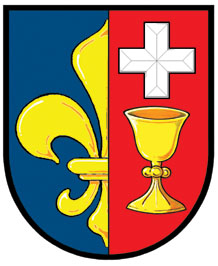
- Flag Coat of arms

- Location in the Czech Republic
- Coordinates: 50°20′28″N 14°22′31″E
- Country: Czech Republic
- Region: Central Bohemian
- District: Mělník
- First mentioned: 1226

Area
  - Total: 10.99 km^{2} (4.24 sq mi)
- Elevation: 238 m (781 ft)

Population (2026-01-01)
  - Total: 704
  - Density: 64.1/km^{2} (166/sq mi)
- Time zone: UTC+1 (CET)
  - Summer (DST): UTC+2 (CEST)
- Postal code: 277 08
- Website: www.ledcice.cz

Ledčice is a municipality and village in Mělník District in the Central Bohemian Region of the Czech Republic. It has about 700 inhabitants.

== Demographics ==
Historical population
Year	Pop.	±%
1869	826	—
1880	832	+0.7%
1890	909	+9.3%
1900	959	+5.5%
1910	1,053	+9.8%
1921	1,008	−4.3%
1930	929	−7.8%
1950	653	−29.7%
1961	673	+3.1%
1970	609	−9.5%
1980	566	−7.1%
1991	569	+0.5%
2001	563	−1.1%
2011	598	+6.2%
2021	675	+12.9%
Source: Censuses
