= Nedomice =

- Municipality
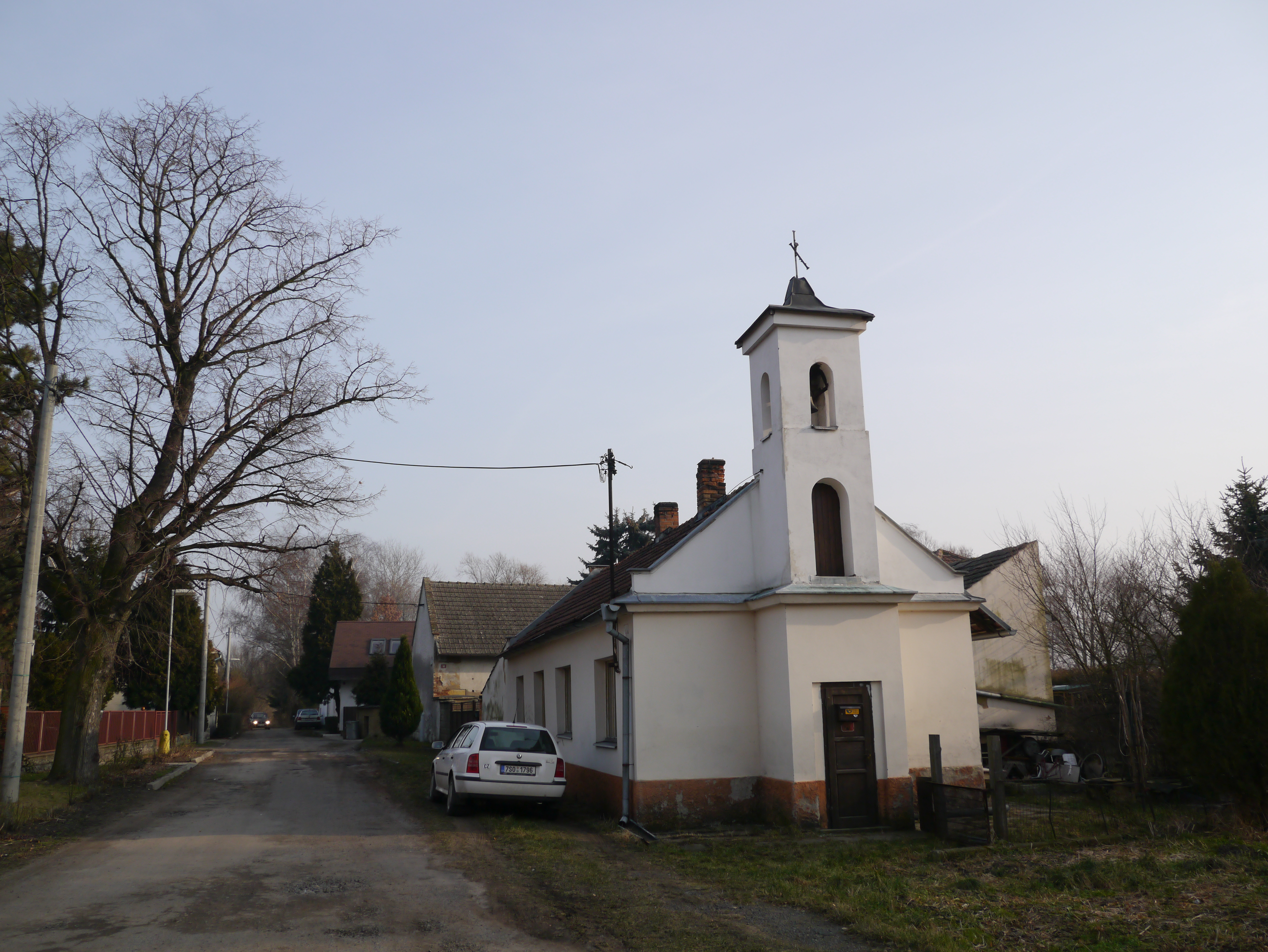
- Chapel in Nedomice

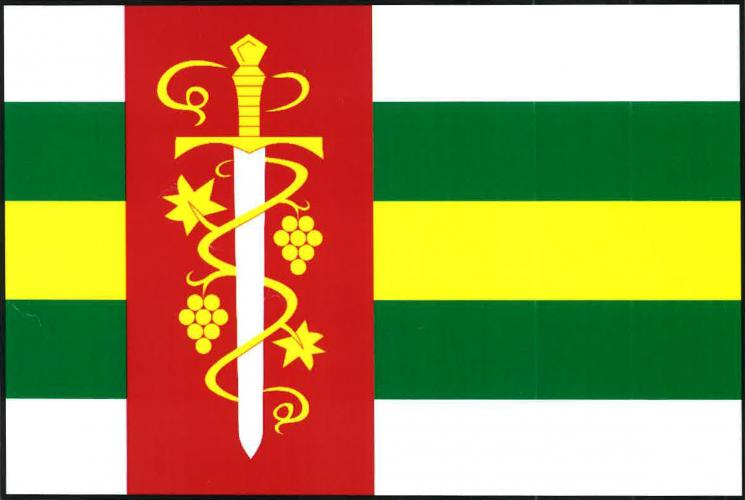
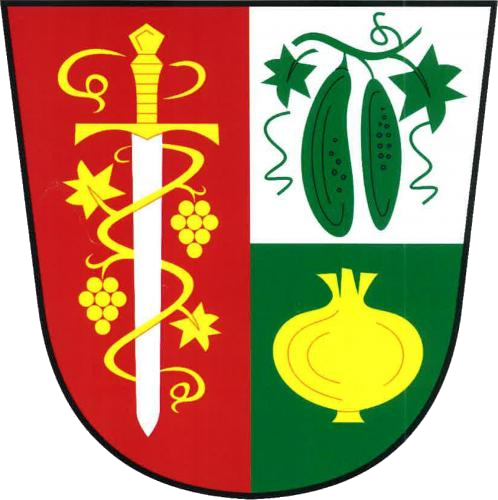
- Flag Coat of arms

- Location in the Czech Republic
- Coordinates: 50°15′35″N 14°36′58″E
- Country: Czech Republic
- Region: Central Bohemian
- District: Mělník
- First mentioned: 1381

Area
  - Total: 3.23 km^{2} (1.25 sq mi)
- Elevation: 172 m (564 ft)

Population (2026-01-01)
  - Total: 356
  - Density: 110/km^{2} (285/sq mi)
- Time zone: UTC+1 (CET)
  - Summer (DST): UTC+2 (CEST)
- Postal code: 277 14
- Website: www.nedomice.cz

Nedomice is a municipality and village in Mělník District in the Central Bohemian Region of the Czech Republic. It has about 400 inhabitants.

== Demographics ==
Historical population
Year	Pop.	±%
1869	368	—
1880	398	+8.2%
1890	355	−10.8%
1900	398	+12.1%
1910	416	+4.5%
1921	407	−2.2%
1930	362	−11.1%
1950	289	−20.2%
1961	267	−7.6%
1970	260	−2.6%
1980	241	−7.3%
1991	237	−1.7%
2001	267	+12.7%
2011	290	+8.6%
2021	308	+6.2%
Source: Censuses
