= Spomyšl =

- Municipality
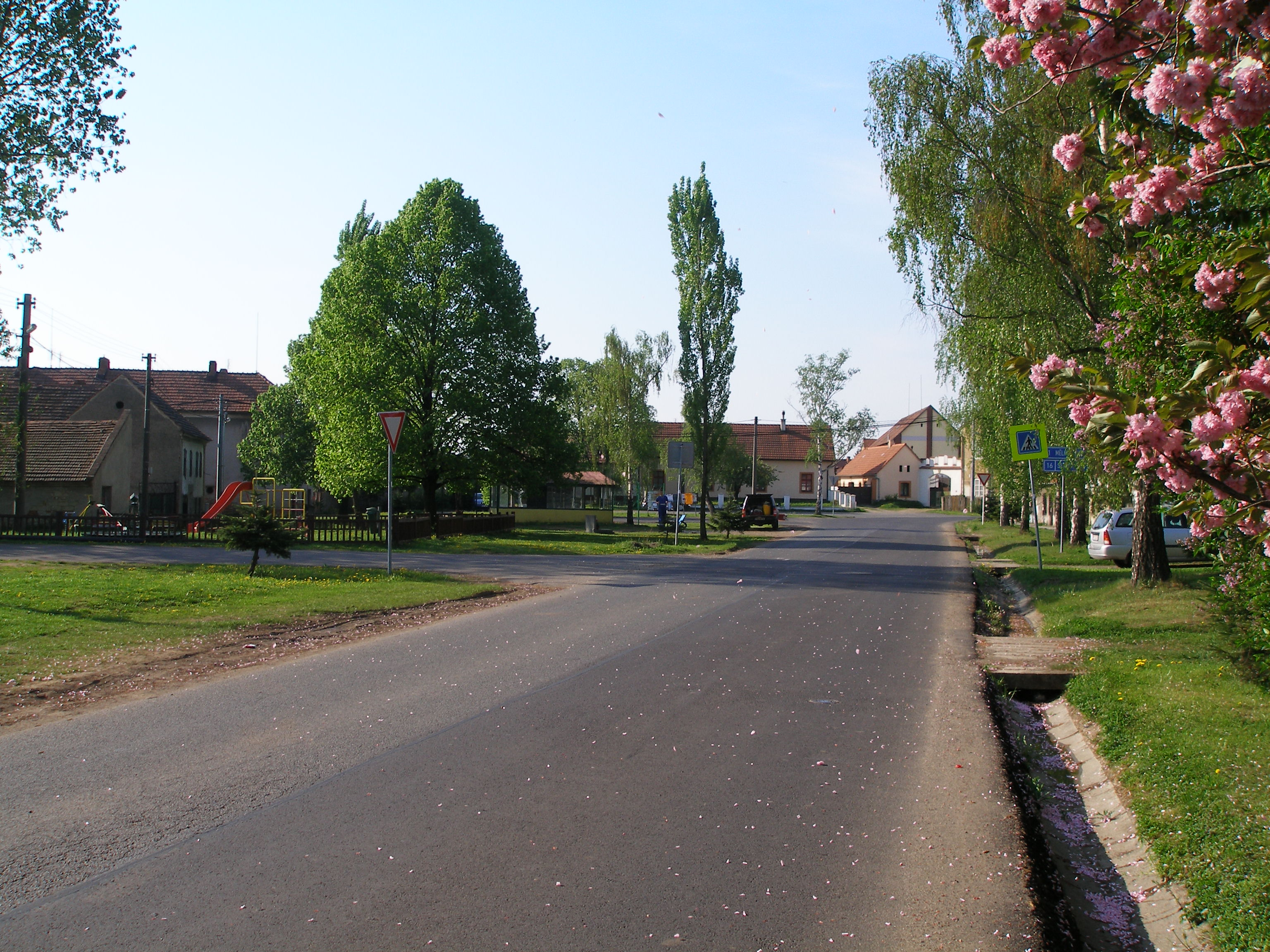
- Centre of Spomyšl

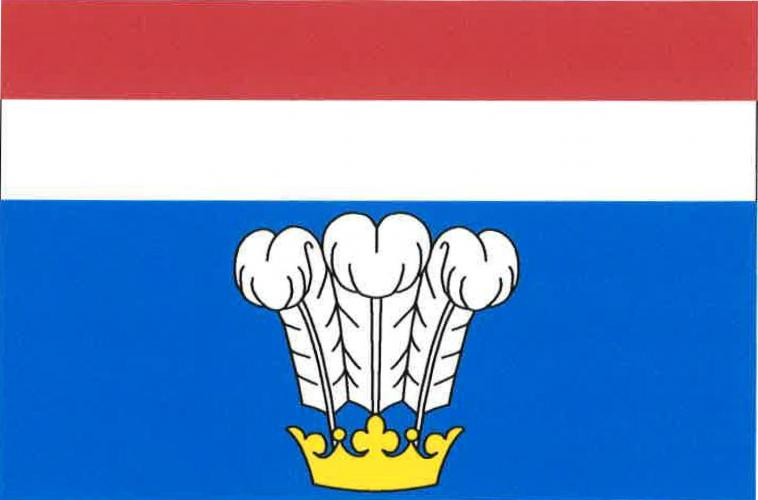
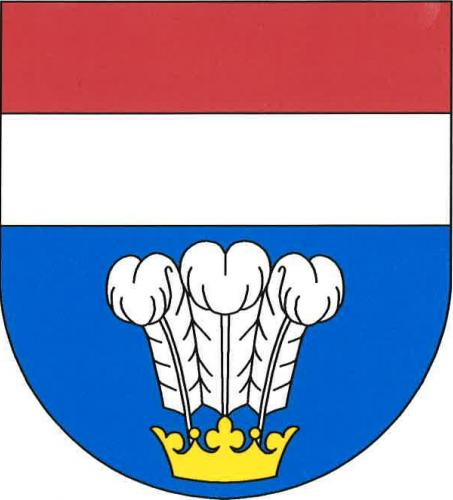
- Flag Coat of arms

- Location in the Czech Republic
- Coordinates: 50°23′26″N 14°40′15″E
- Country: Czech Republic
- Region: Central Bohemian
- District: Mělník
- First mentioned: 1403

Area
  - Total: 3.59 km^{2} (1.39 sq mi)
- Elevation: 178 m (584 ft)

Population (2026-01-01)
  - Total: 603
  - Density: 168/km^{2} (435/sq mi)
- Time zone: UTC+1 (CET)
  - Summer (DST): UTC+2 (CEST)
- Postal code: 277 05
- Website: www.spomysl.cz

Spomyšl is a municipality and village in Mělník District in the Central Bohemian Region of the Czech Republic. It has about 600 inhabitants.

== Demographics ==
Historical population
Year	Pop.	±%
1869	237	—
1880	287	+21.1%
1890	340	+18.5%
1900	384	+12.9%
1910	437	+13.8%
1921	456	+4.3%
1930	520	+14.0%
1950	423	−18.7%
1961	436	+3.1%
1970	436	+0.0%
1980	409	−6.2%
1991	415	+1.5%
2001	404	−2.7%
2011	464	+14.9%
2021	518	+11.6%
Source: Censuses
