= Kanina (Mělník District) =

- Municipality
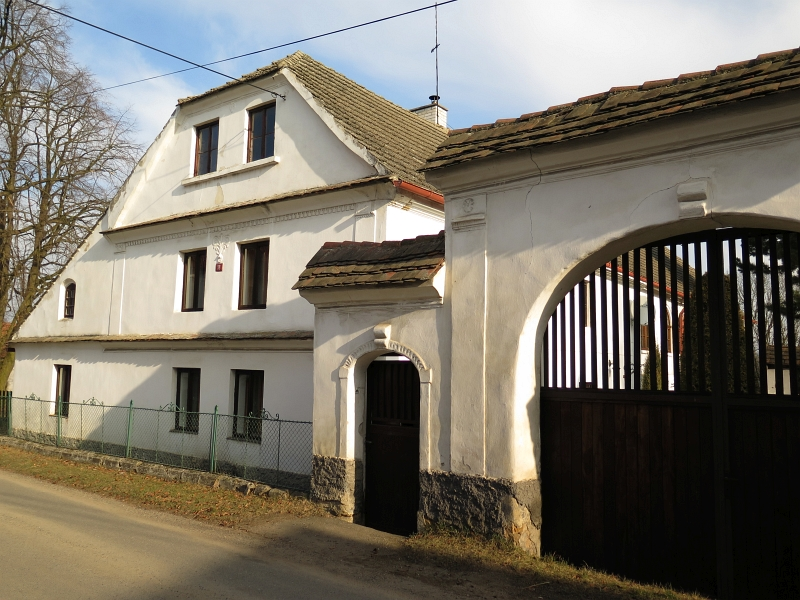
- Farmstead No. 18

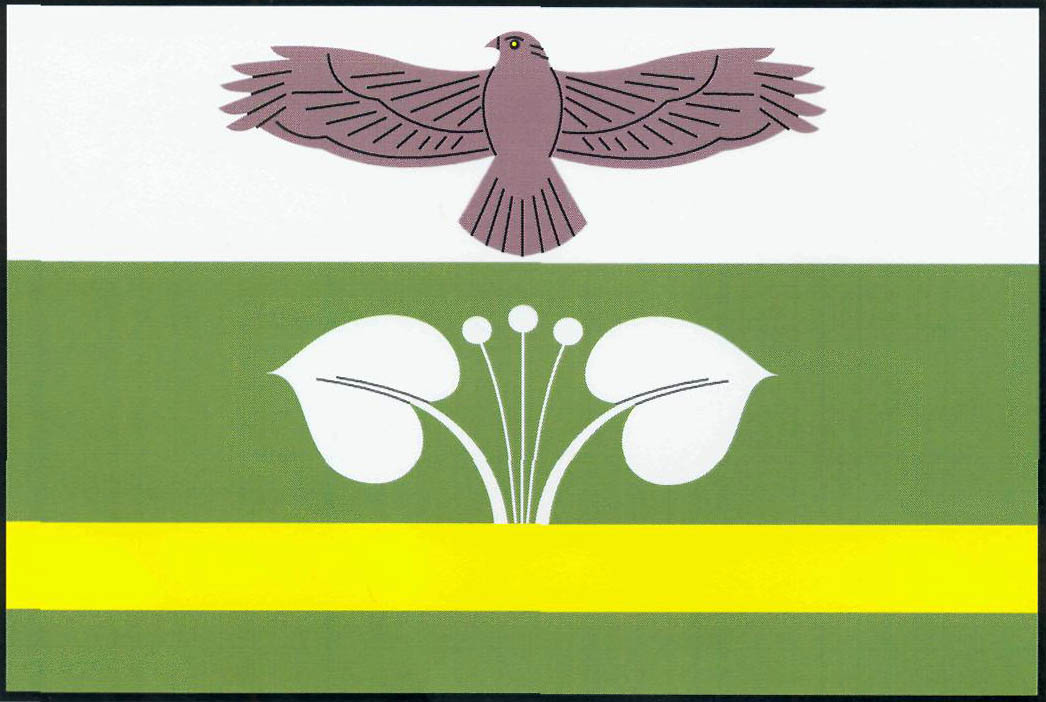
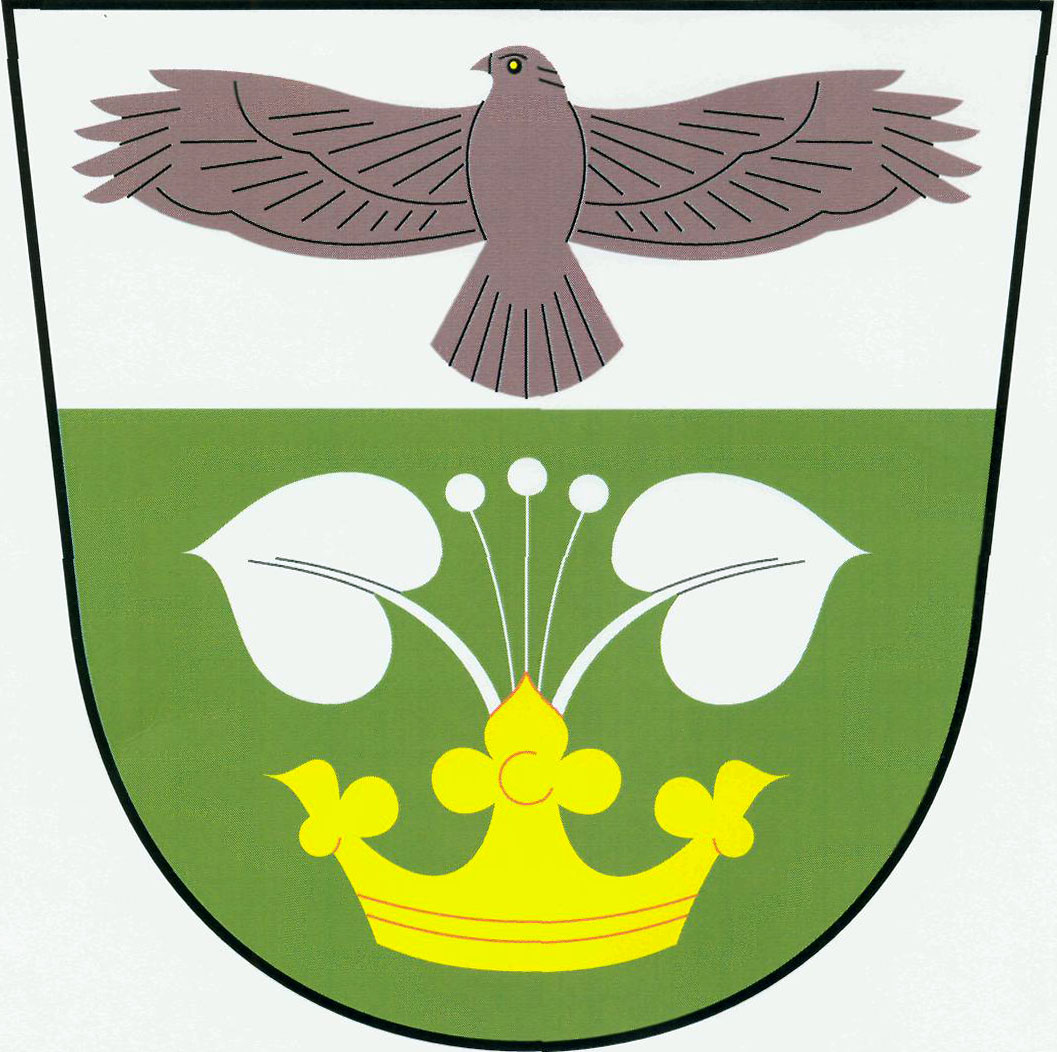
- Flag Coat of arms

- Location in the Czech Republic
- Coordinates: 50°25′29″N 14°36′0″E
- Country: Czech Republic
- Region: Central Bohemian
- District: Mělník
- First mentioned: 1207

Area
  - Total: 5.29 km^{2} (2.04 sq mi)
- Elevation: 342 m (1,122 ft)

Population (2026-01-01)
  - Total: 109
  - Density: 20.6/km^{2} (53.4/sq mi)
- Time zone: UTC+1 (CET)
  - Summer (DST): UTC+2 (CEST)
- Postal code: 277 35
- Website: kanina.cz

Kanina is a municipality and village in Mělník District in the Central Bohemian Region of the Czech Republic. It has about 100 inhabitants.

== History ==
The first written mention of Kanina is from 1207.

== Demographics ==
Historical population
| Year | Pop. | ±% |
|---|---|---|
| 1869 | 257 | — |
| 1880 | 278 | +8.2% |
| 1890 | 292 | +5.0% |
| 1900 | 286 | −2.1% |
| 1910 | 309 | +8.0% |
| 1921 | 320 | +3.6% |
| 1930 | 273 | −14.7% |
| 1950 | 209 | −23.4% |
| 1961 | 183 | −12.4% |
| 1970 | 213 | +16.4% |
| 1980 | 114 | −46.5% |
| 1991 | 60 | −47.4% |
| 2001 | 45 | −25.0% |
| 2011 | 70 | +55.6% |
| 2021 | 86 | +22.9% |
Source: Censuses
