= Tuhaň (Mělník District) =

- Municipality
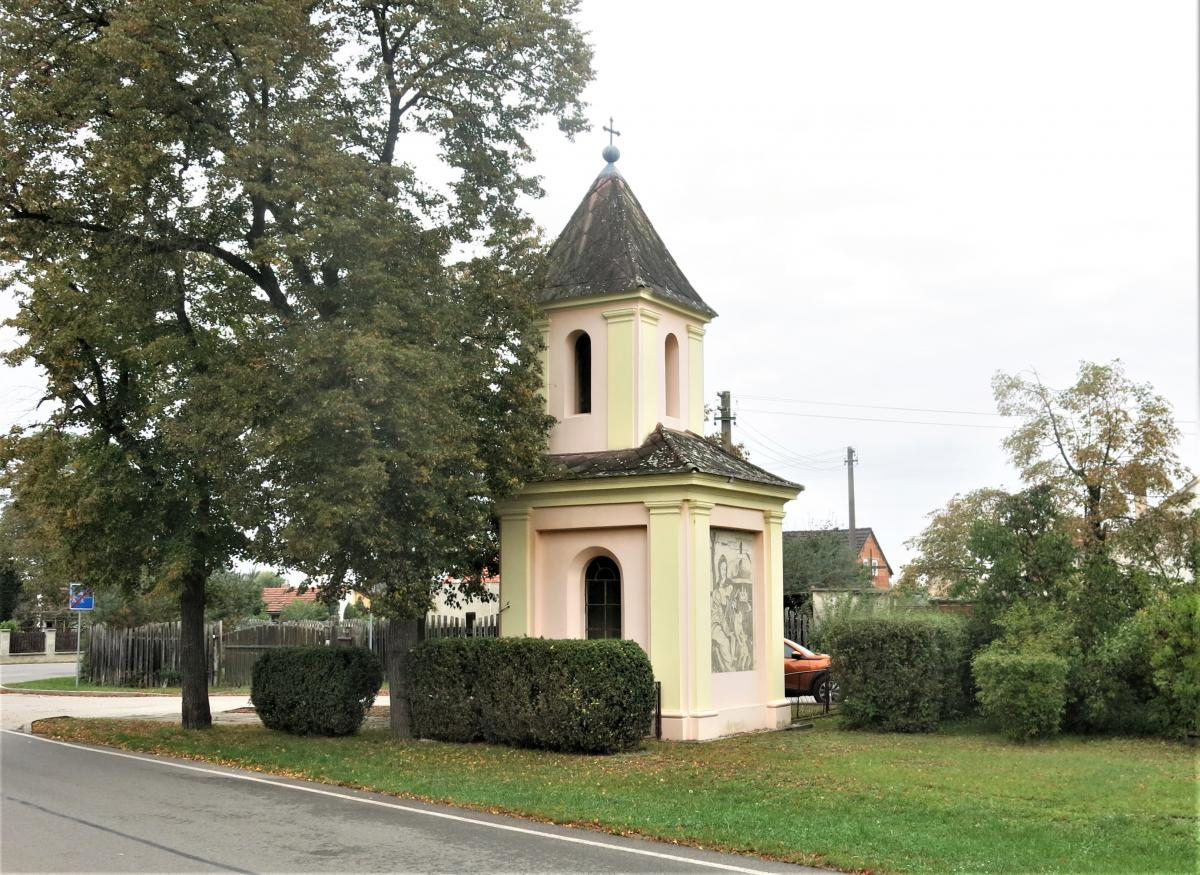
- Chapel in the centre

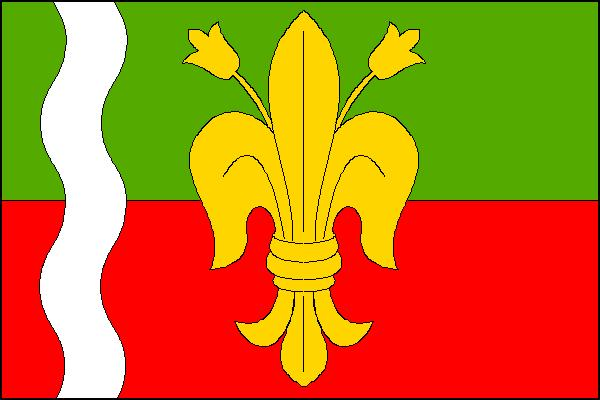
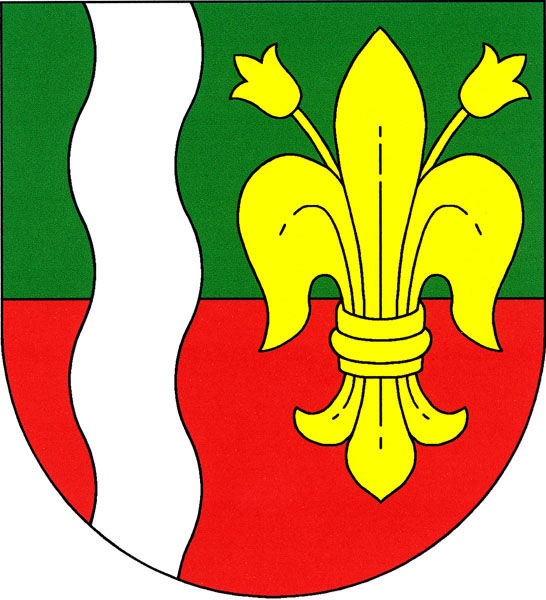
- Flag Coat of arms

- Location in the Czech Republic
- Coordinates: 50°17′44″N 14°31′2″E
- Country: Czech Republic
- Region: Central Bohemian
- District: Mělník
- First mentioned: 1548

Area
  - Total: 4.62 km^{2} (1.78 sq mi)
- Elevation: 161 m (528 ft)

Population (2026-01-01)
  - Total: 893
  - Density: 193/km^{2} (501/sq mi)
- Time zone: UTC+1 (CET)
  - Summer (DST): UTC+2 (CEST)
- Postal code: 277 41
- Website: www.tuhan.cz

Tuhaň is a municipality and village in Mělník District in the Central Bohemian Region of the Czech Republic. It has about 900 inhabitants.

== Demographics ==
Historical population
Year	Pop.	±%
1869	522	—
1880	543	+4.0%
1890	628	+15.7%
1900	651	+3.7%
1910	755	+16.0%
1921	724	−4.1%
1930	761	+5.1%
1950	742	−2.5%
1961	731	−1.5%
1970	702	−4.0%
1980	602	−14.2%
1991	509	−15.4%
2001	546	+7.3%
2011	638	+16.8%
2021	807	+26.5%
Source: Censuses
