= Mělník District =

Mělník District Okres Mělník
- District
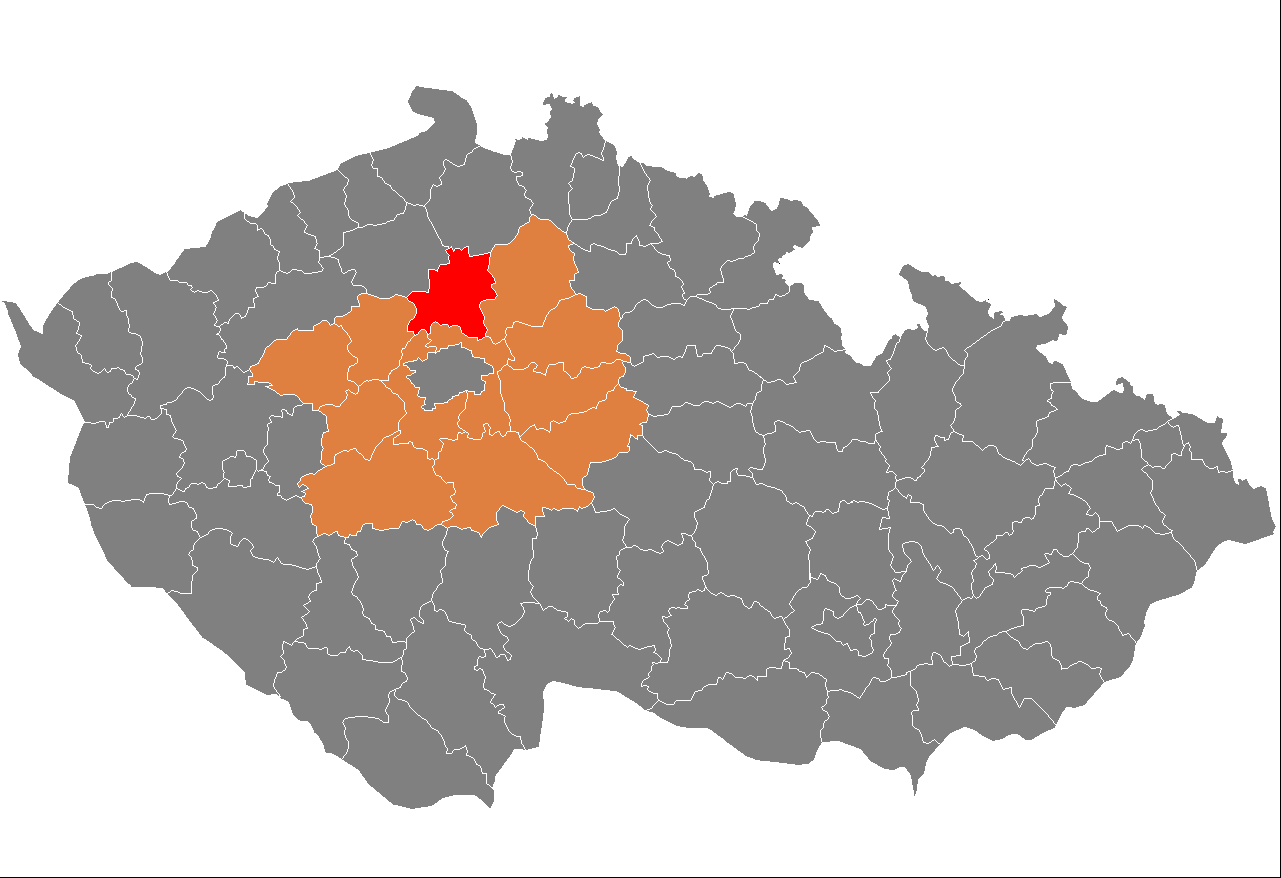
- Location in the Central Bohemian Region within the Czech Republic

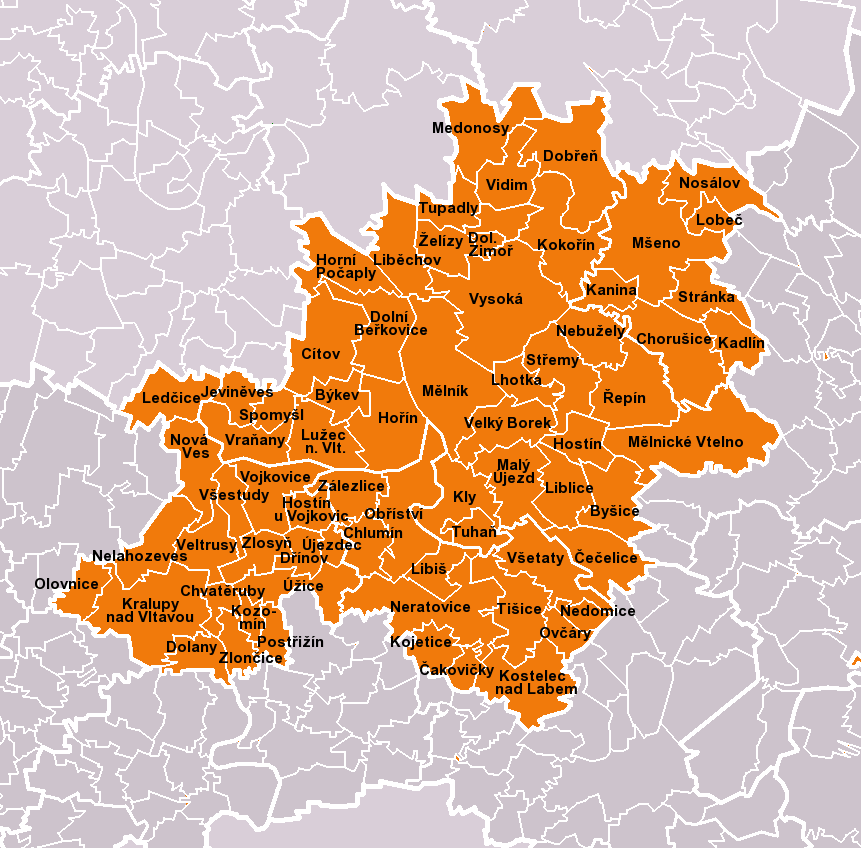
- Coordinates: 50°21′N 14°31′E
- Country: Czech Republic
- Region: Central Bohemian
- Capital: Mělník

Area
  - Total: 701.07 km^{2} (270.68 sq mi)

Population (2026)
  - Total: 115,209
  - Density: 164.33/km^{2} (425.62/sq mi)
- Time zone: UTC+1 (CET)
  - Summer (DST): UTC+2 (CEST)
- Municipalities: 69
- * Towns: 7
- * Market towns: 1

Mělník District (Czech: okres Mělník) is a district in the Central Bohemian Region of the Czech Republic. Its capital is the town of Mělník.

== Administrative division ==
Mělník District is divided into three administrative districts of municipalities with extended competence: Mělník, Kralupy nad Vltavou and Neratovice.

=== List of municipalities ===
Towns are marked in bold and market towns in italics:

Býkev - Byšice - Čakovičky - Čečelice - Chlumín - Chorušice - Chvatěruby - Cítov - Dobřeň - Dolany nad Vltavou - Dolní Beřkovice - Dolní Zimoř - Dřínov - Hořín - Horní Počaply - Hostín - Hostín u Vojkovic - Jeviněves - Kadlín - Kanina - Kly - Kojetice - Kokořín - Kostelec nad Labem - Kozomín - Kralupy nad Vltavou - Ledčice - Lhotka - Liběchov - Libiš - Liblice - Lobeč - Lužec nad Vltavou - Malý Újezd - Medonosy - Mělnické Vtelno - Mělník - Mšeno - Nebužely - Nedomice - Nelahozeves - Neratovice - Nosálov - Nová Ves - Obříství - Olovnice - Ovčáry - Postřižín - Řepín - Spomyšl - Stránka - Střemy - Tišice - Tuhaň - Tupadly - Újezdec - Úžice - Velký Borek - Veltrusy - Vidim - Vojkovice - Vraňany - Všestudy - Všetaty - Vysoká - Zálezlice - Želízy - Zlončice - Zlosyň

== Geography ==
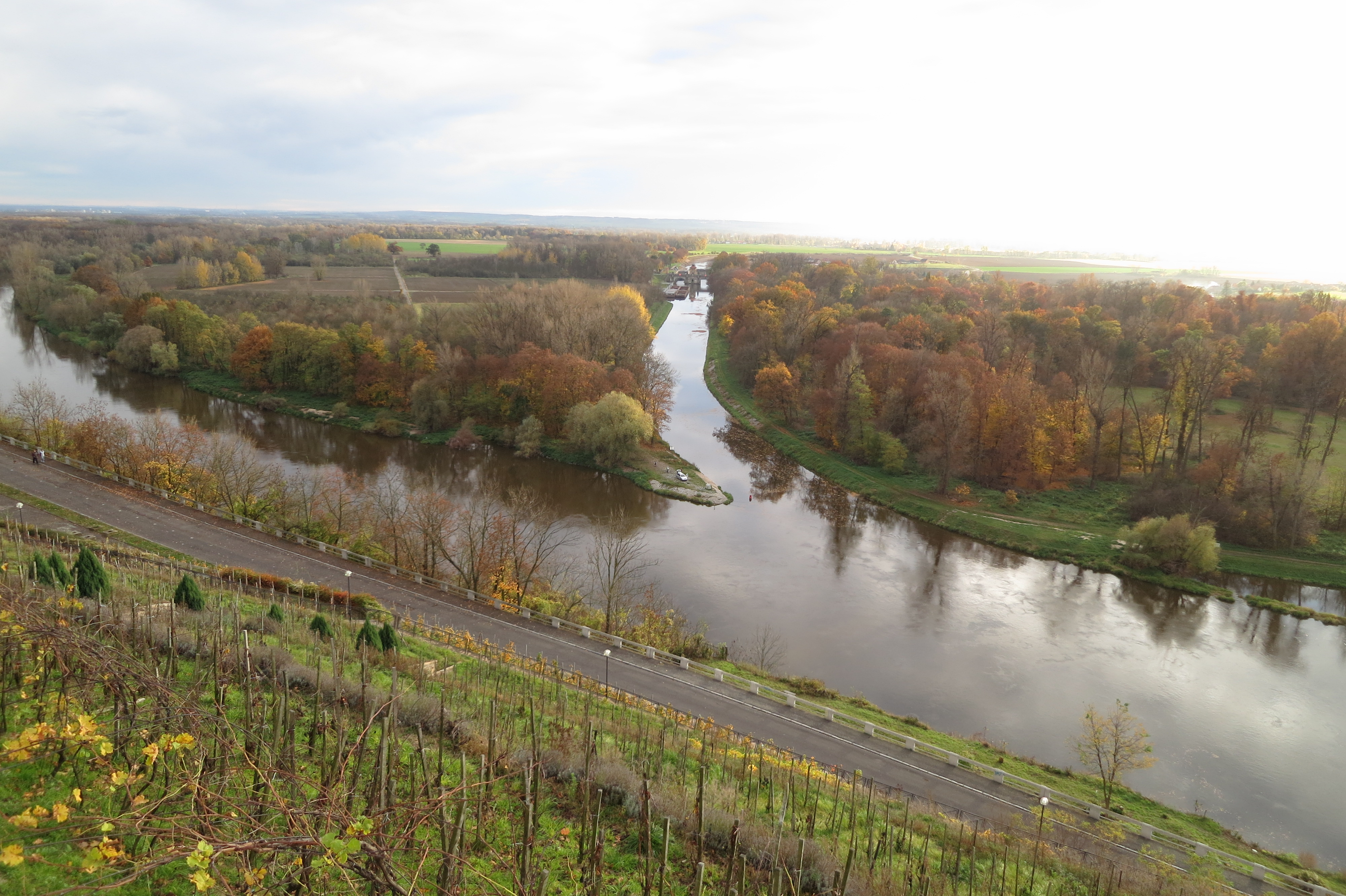
Confluence of the Elbe with a channel of the Vltava

The landscape is mostly flat and belongs to the Polabí lowlands, only the northern part of the district is hilly and forested areas prevail. The territory extends into four geomorphological mesoregions: Jizera Table (east), Ralsko Uplands (north), Lower Ohře Table (west) and Central Elbe Table (south). The highest point of the district is the hill Vrátenská hora in Nosálov with an elevation of 507 m (1,663 ft), the lowest point is the river bed of the Elbe in Horní Počaply at 153 m (502 ft). It is also the lowest point of the entire Central Bohemian Region.

From the total district area of 701.1 km^{2} (270.7 sq mi), agricultural land occupies 458.9 km^{2} (177.2 sq mi), forests occupy 133.0 km^{2} (51.4 sq mi), and water area occupies 14.7 km^{2} (5.7 sq mi). Forests cover 19.0% of the district's area.

The confluence of the two longest rivers in the country, Elbe and Vltava, is located in the centre of the district. The Elbe then flows further to the north. There are not many bodies of water.

Kokořínsko – Máchův kraj is the only protected landscape area that extends into the district, into its northern part.

== Demographics ==
Historical population

Year	Pop.	±%
1869	62,294	—
1880	68,428	+9.8%
1890	70,939	+3.7%
1900	75,381	+6.3%
1910	80,348	+6.6%

Year	Pop.	±%
1921	81,817	+1.8%
1930	89,660	+9.6%
1950	80,358	−10.4%
1961	85,827	+6.8%
1970	90,593	+5.6%

Year	Pop.	±%
1980	98,191	+8.4%
1991	94,241	−4.0%
2001	94,635	+0.4%
2011	104,659	+10.6%
2021	110,243	+5.3%

Source: Censuses

=== Most populous municipalities ===
Name	Population	Area (km^{2})
Mělník	20,301	25
Kralupy nad Vltavou	19,138	22
Neratovice	16,279	20
Kostelec nad Labem	4,459	16
Tišice	2,636	13
Všetaty	2,495	13
Libiš	2,425	7
Veltrusy	2,328	8
Nelahozeves	2,213	10
Postřižín	2,033	4

== Economy ==
The largest employers with headquarters in Mělník District and at least 500 employees are:

Economic entity	Location	Number of employees	Main activity
Bidfood Czech Republic	Kralupy nad Vltavou	1,500–1,999	Wholesale trade
Mělnická zdravotní	Mělník	1,000–1,499	Health care
Orkla Foods Česko a Slovensko	Byšice	500–999	Food industry
Synthos Kralupy	Kralupy nad Vltavou	500–999	Chemical industry
Erwin Junker Grinding Technology	Mělník	500–999	Manufacture of grinding tools
Vibracoustic CZ	Mělník	500–999	Manufacture of rubber products
Zásobování a.s.	Mělník	500–999	Wholesale trade
Spolana	Neratovice	500–999	Chemical industry

== Transport ==
The D8 motorway from Prague to Ústí nad Labem passes through the western part of the district.

== Sights ==
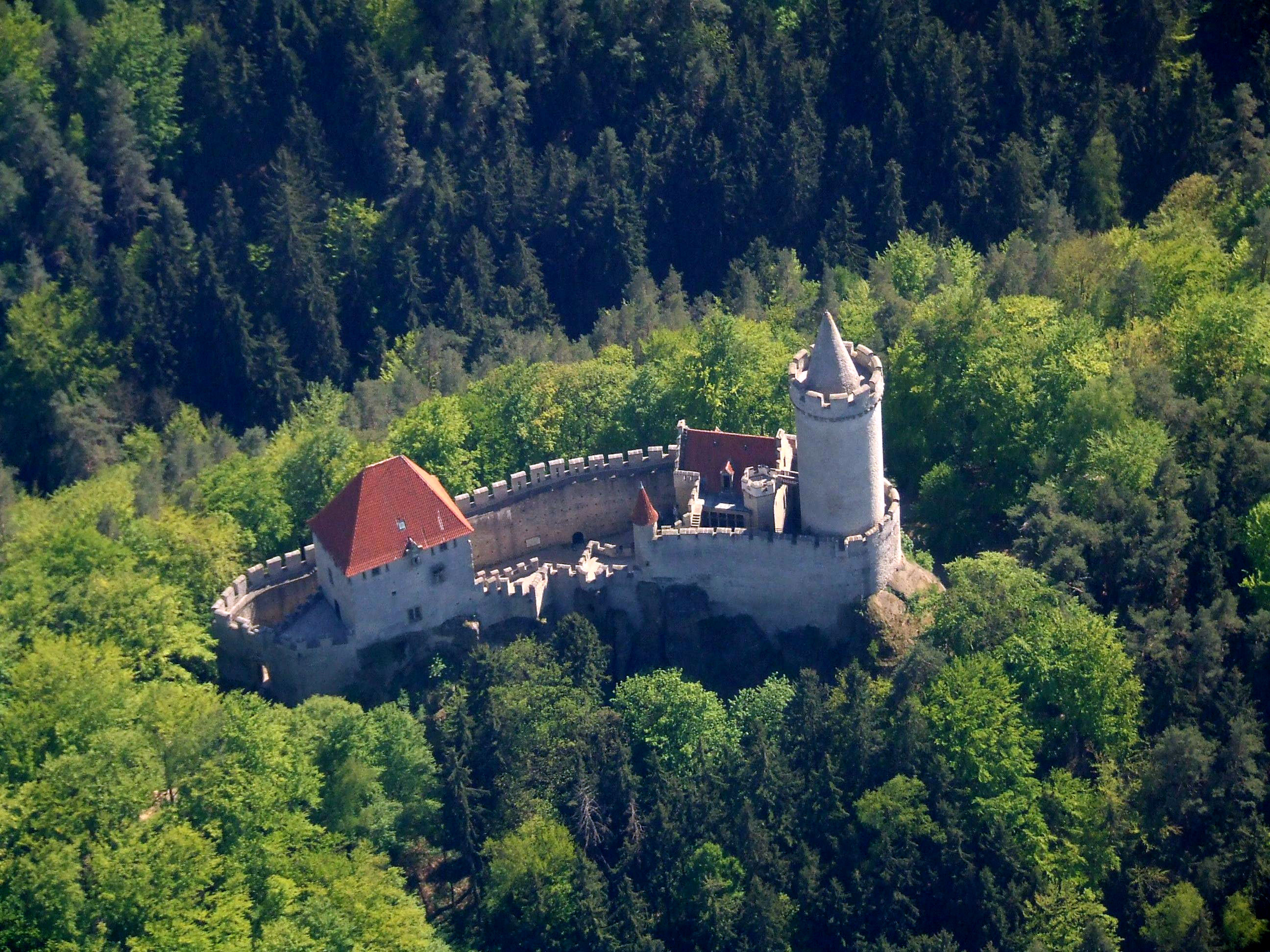
Kokořín Castle

The most important monuments in the district, protected as national cultural monuments, are:

- Kokořín Castle
- Veltrusy Mansion

The best-preserved settlements, protected as monument reservations and monument zones, are:

- Dobřeň (monument reservation)
- Nosálov (monument reservation)
- Nové Osinalice (monument reservation)
- Olešno (monument reservation)
- Kostelec nad Labem
- Mělník
- Mšeno
- Debrno
- Jestřebice
- Lobeč
- Sitné
- Střezivojice
- Vidim
- Vrbno

The most visited tourist destination is the Kokořín Castle.
