= Nebužely =

- Municipality
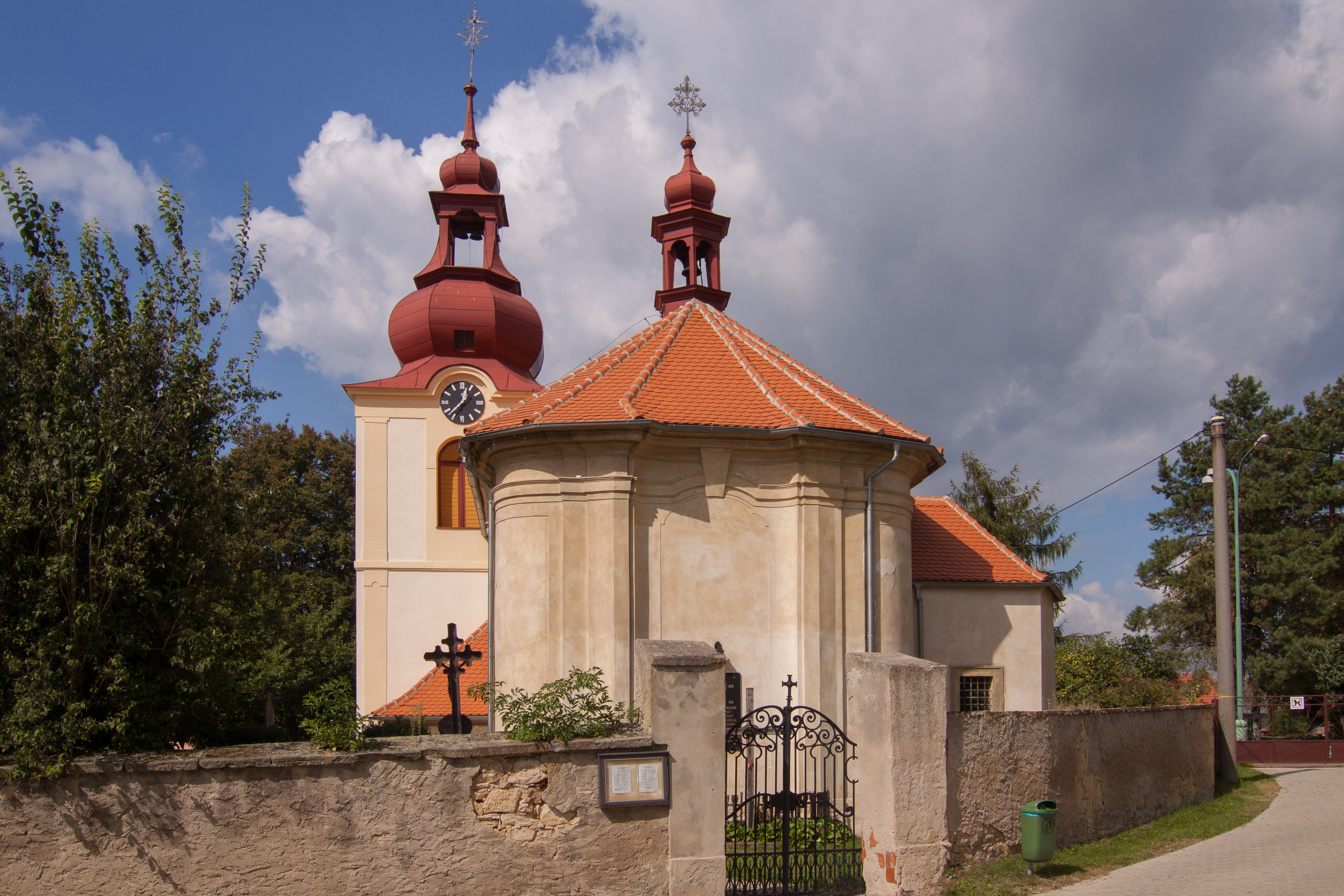
- Church of Saint Giles

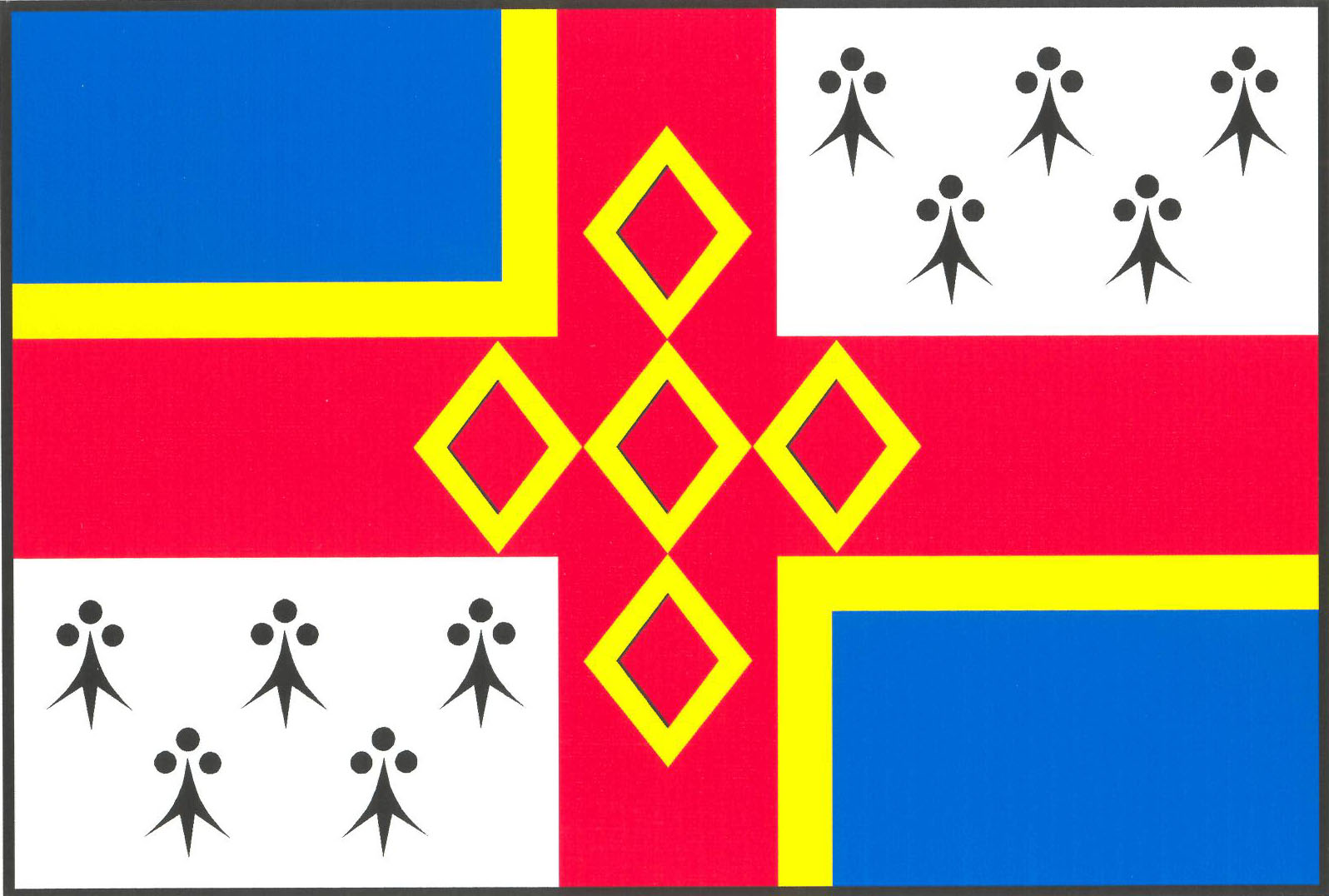
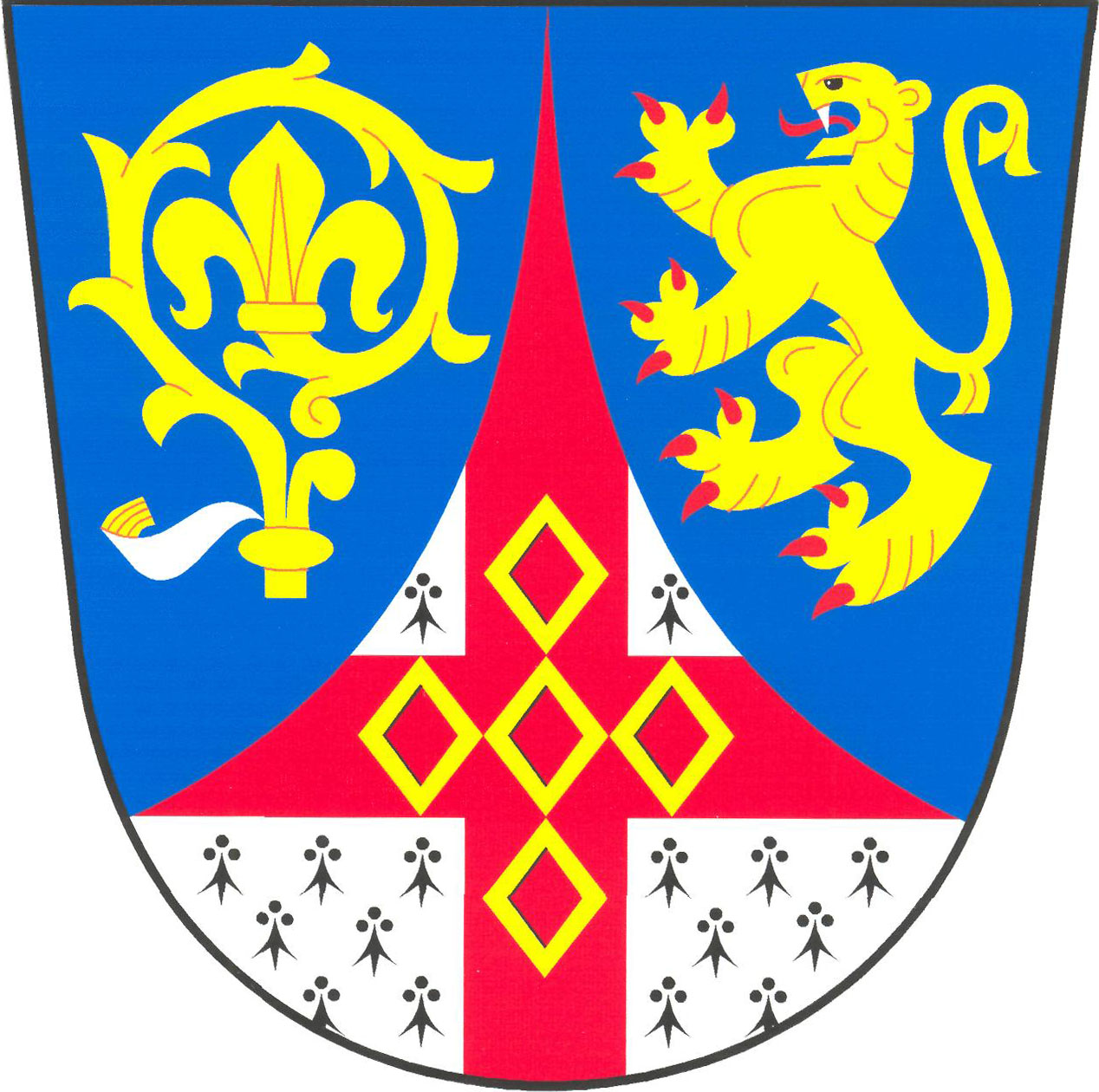
- Flag Coat of arms

- Location in the Czech Republic
- Coordinates: 50°23′25″N 14°35′27″E
- Country: Czech Republic
- Region: Central Bohemian
- District: Mělník
- First mentioned: 1227

Area
  - Total: 8.61 km^{2} (3.32 sq mi)
- Elevation: 311 m (1,020 ft)

Population (2026-01-01)
  - Total: 408
  - Density: 47.4/km^{2} (123/sq mi)
- Time zone: UTC+1 (CET)
  - Summer (DST): UTC+2 (CEST)
- Postal code: 277 34
- Website: www.nebuzely.cz

Nebužely is a municipality and village in Mělník District in the Central Bohemian Region of the Czech Republic. It has about 400 inhabitants.

== Demographics ==
Historical population
Year	Pop.	±%
1869	525	—
1880	557	+6.1%
1890	577	+3.6%
1900	577	+0.0%
1910	567	−1.7%
1921	647	+14.1%
1930	643	−0.6%
1950	487	−24.3%
1961	489	+0.4%
1970	459	−6.1%
1980	475	+3.5%
1991	391	−17.7%
2001	390	−0.3%
2011	417	+6.9%
2021	407	−2.4%
Source: Censuses
