= Čakovičky =

- Municipality
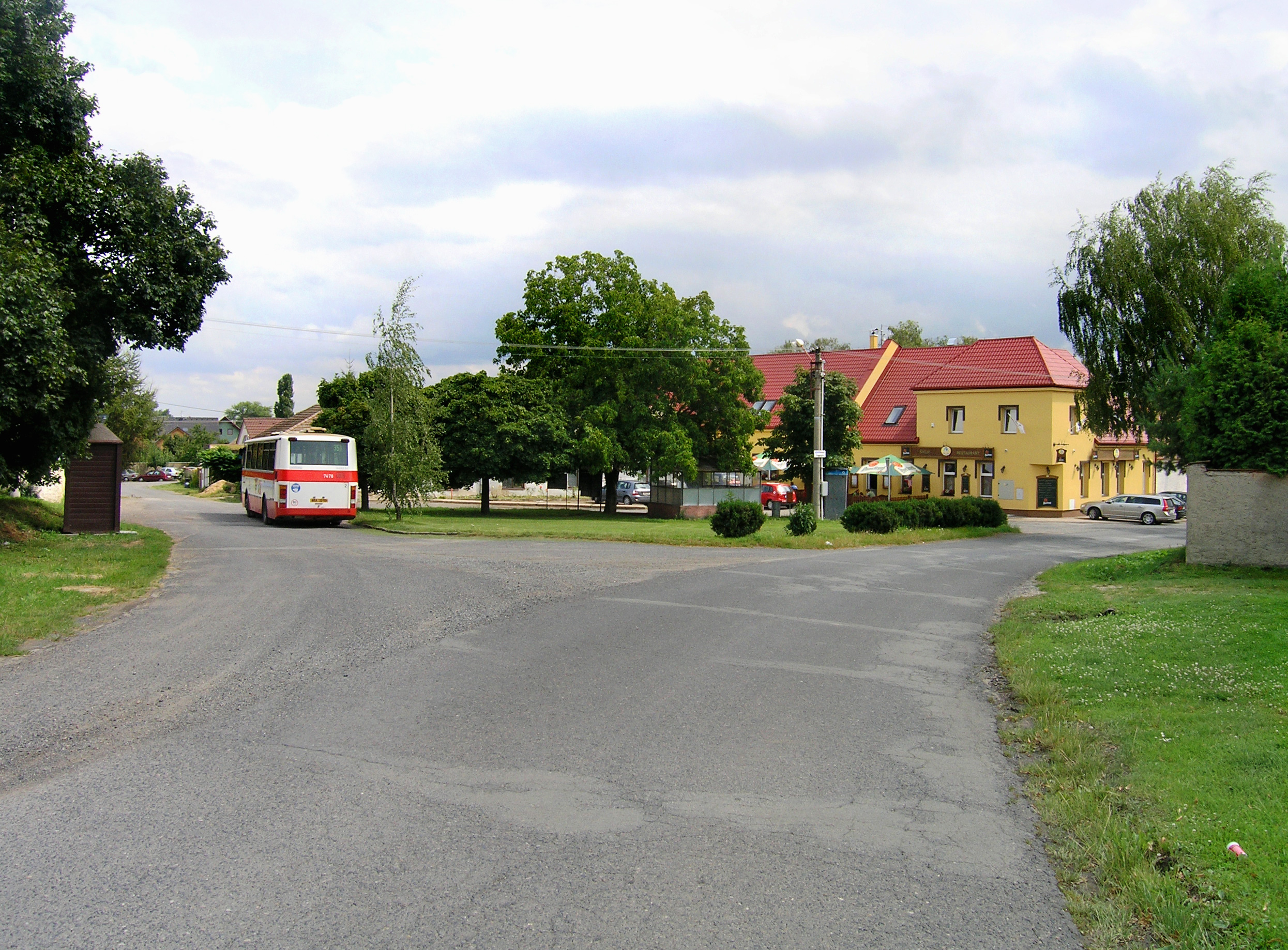
- Centre of Čakovičky

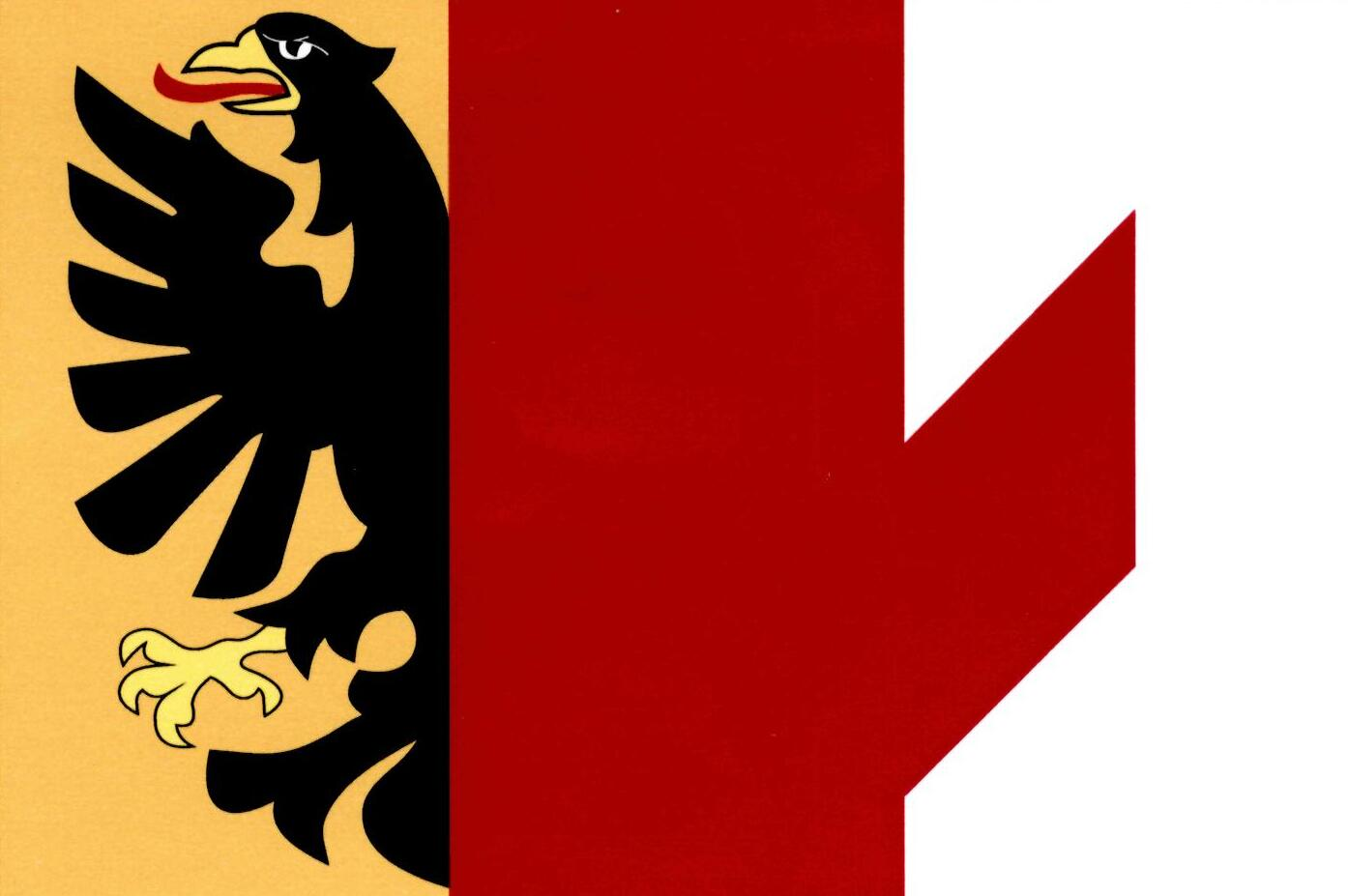
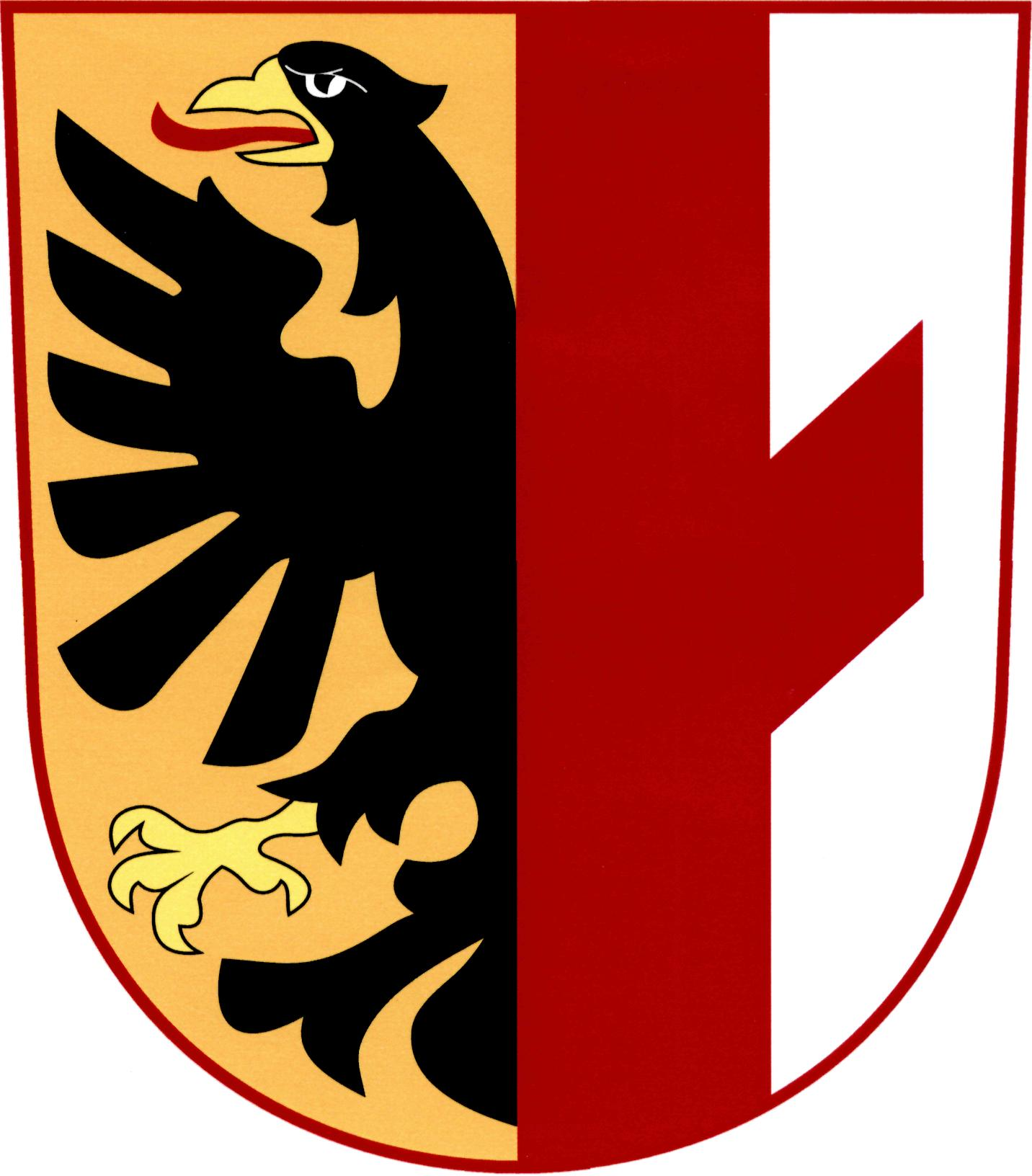
- Flag Coat of arms

- Location in the Czech Republic
- Coordinates: 50°13′54″N 14°31′53″E
- Country: Czech Republic
- Region: Central Bohemian
- District: Mělník
- First mentioned: 1266

Area
  - Total: 3.14 km^{2} (1.21 sq mi)
- Elevation: 176 m (577 ft)

Population (2026-01-01)
  - Total: 737
  - Density: 235/km^{2} (608/sq mi)
- Time zone: UTC+1 (CET)
  - Summer (DST): UTC+2 (CEST)
- Postal code: 250 63
- Website: www.cakovicky.cz

Čakovičky is a municipality and village in Mělník District in the Central Bohemian Region of the Czech Republic. It has about 700 inhabitants.

== Demographics ==
Historical population
Year	Pop.	±%
1869	262	—
1880	287	+9.5%
1890	314	+9.4%
1900	374	+19.1%
1910	358	−4.3%
1921	325	−9.2%
1930	394	+21.2%
1950	263	−33.2%
1961	240	−8.7%
1970	204	−15.0%
1980	206	+1.0%
1991	186	−9.7%
2001	241	+29.6%
2011	554	+129.9%
2021	779	+40.6%
Source: Censuses
