= Střemy =

- Municipality
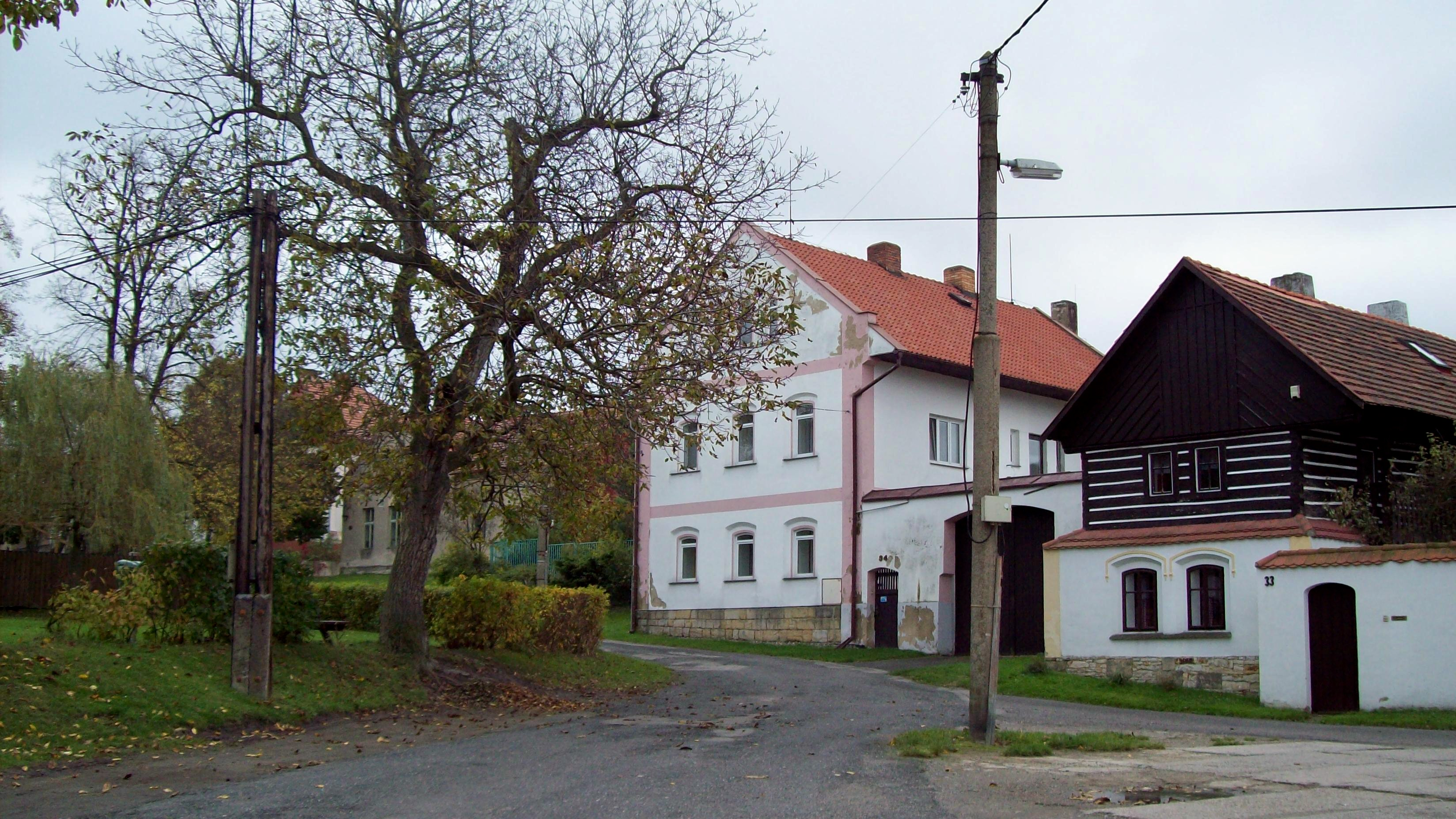
- Centre of Střemy

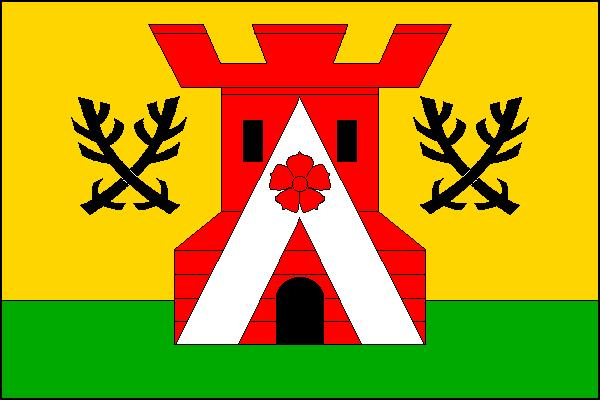
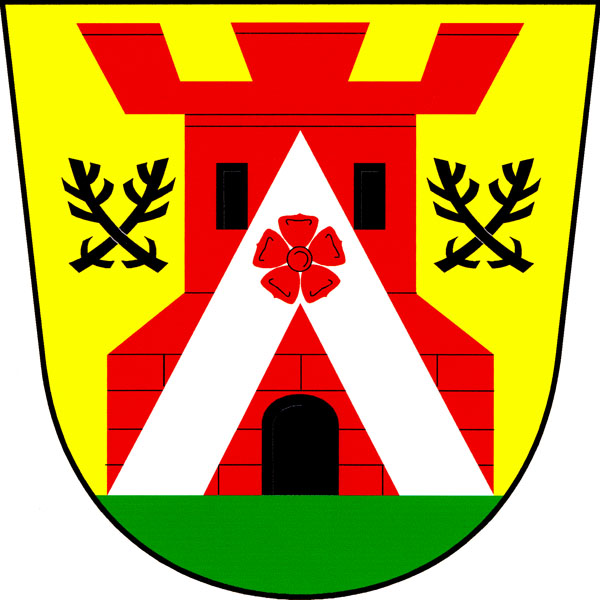
- Flag Coat of arms

- Location in the Czech Republic
- Coordinates: 50°23′3″N 14°33′56″E
- Country: Czech Republic
- Region: Central Bohemian
- District: Mělník
- First mentioned: 1245

Area
  - Total: 11.71 km^{2} (4.52 sq mi)
- Elevation: 275 m (902 ft)

Population (2026-01-01)
  - Total: 494
  - Density: 42.2/km^{2} (109/sq mi)
- Time zone: UTC+1 (CET)
  - Summer (DST): UTC+2 (CEST)
- Postal code: 277 34
- Website: www.stremy.cz

Střemy is a municipality and village in Mělník District in the Central Bohemian Region of the Czech Republic. It has about 500 inhabitants.

== Administrative division ==
Střemy consists of two municipal parts (in brackets population according to the 2021 census):

- Střemy (320)
- Jenichov (144)

== Demographics ==
Historical population
Year	Pop.	±%
1869	662	—
1880	696	+5.1%
1890	748	+7.5%
1900	736	−1.6%
1910	693	−5.8%
1921	698	+0.7%
1930	624	−10.6%
1950	477	−23.6%
1961	493	+3.4%
1970	434	−12.0%
1980	381	−12.2%
1991	337	−11.5%
2001	360	+6.8%
2011	390	+8.3%
2021	464	+19.0%
Source: Censuses
