= Chorušice =

- Municipality
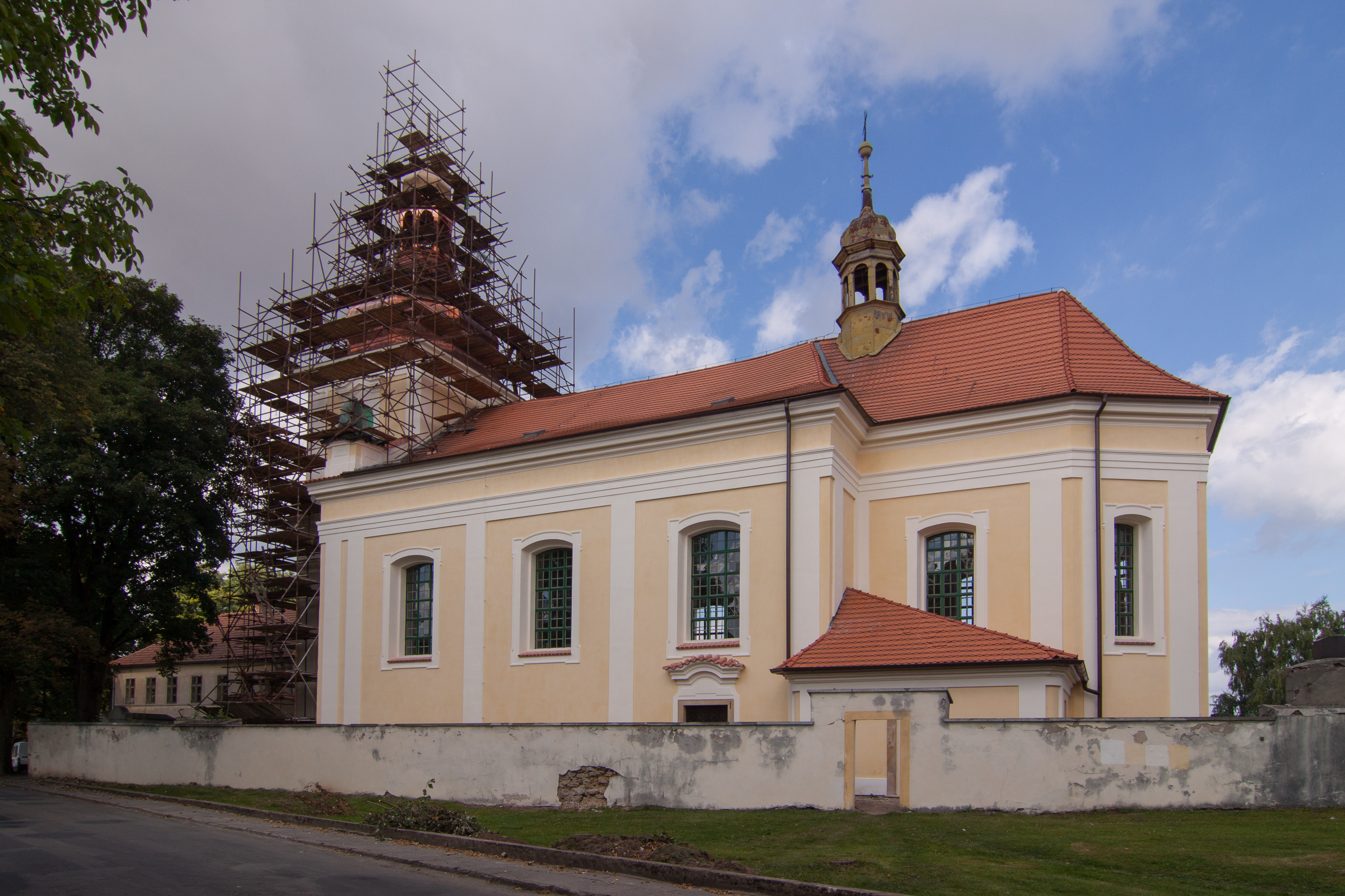
- Church of the Assumption of the Virgin Mary

- Location in the Czech Republic
- Coordinates: 50°23′26″N 14°40′15″E
- Country: Czech Republic
- Region: Central Bohemian
- District: Mělník
- First mentioned: 1233

Area
  - Total: 17.76 km^{2} (6.86 sq mi)
- Elevation: 303 m (994 ft)

Population (2026-01-01)
  - Total: 567
  - Density: 31.9/km^{2} (82.7/sq mi)
- Time zone: UTC+1 (CET)
  - Summer (DST): UTC+2 (CEST)
- Postal codes: 277 35, 277 37
- Website: www.chorusice.cz

Chorušice is a municipality and village in Mělník District in the Central Bohemian Region of the Czech Republic. It has about 600 inhabitants.

== Administrative division ==
Chorušice consists of four municipal parts (in brackets population according to the 2021 census):

- Chorušice (271)
- Choroušky (16)
- Velký Újezd (230)
- Zahájí (36)

== Demographics ==
Historical population
Year	Pop.	±%
1869	1,103	—
1880	1,139	+3.3%
1890	1,233	+8.3%
1900	1,232	−0.1%
1910	1,273	+3.3%
1921	1,304	+2.4%
1930	1,198	−8.1%
1950	866	−27.7%
1961	689	−20.4%
1970	614	−10.9%
1980	528	−14.0%
1991	444	−15.9%
2001	452	+1.8%
2011	451	−0.2%
2021	553	+22.6%
Source: Censuses
