= Lhotka (Mělník District) =

- Municipality
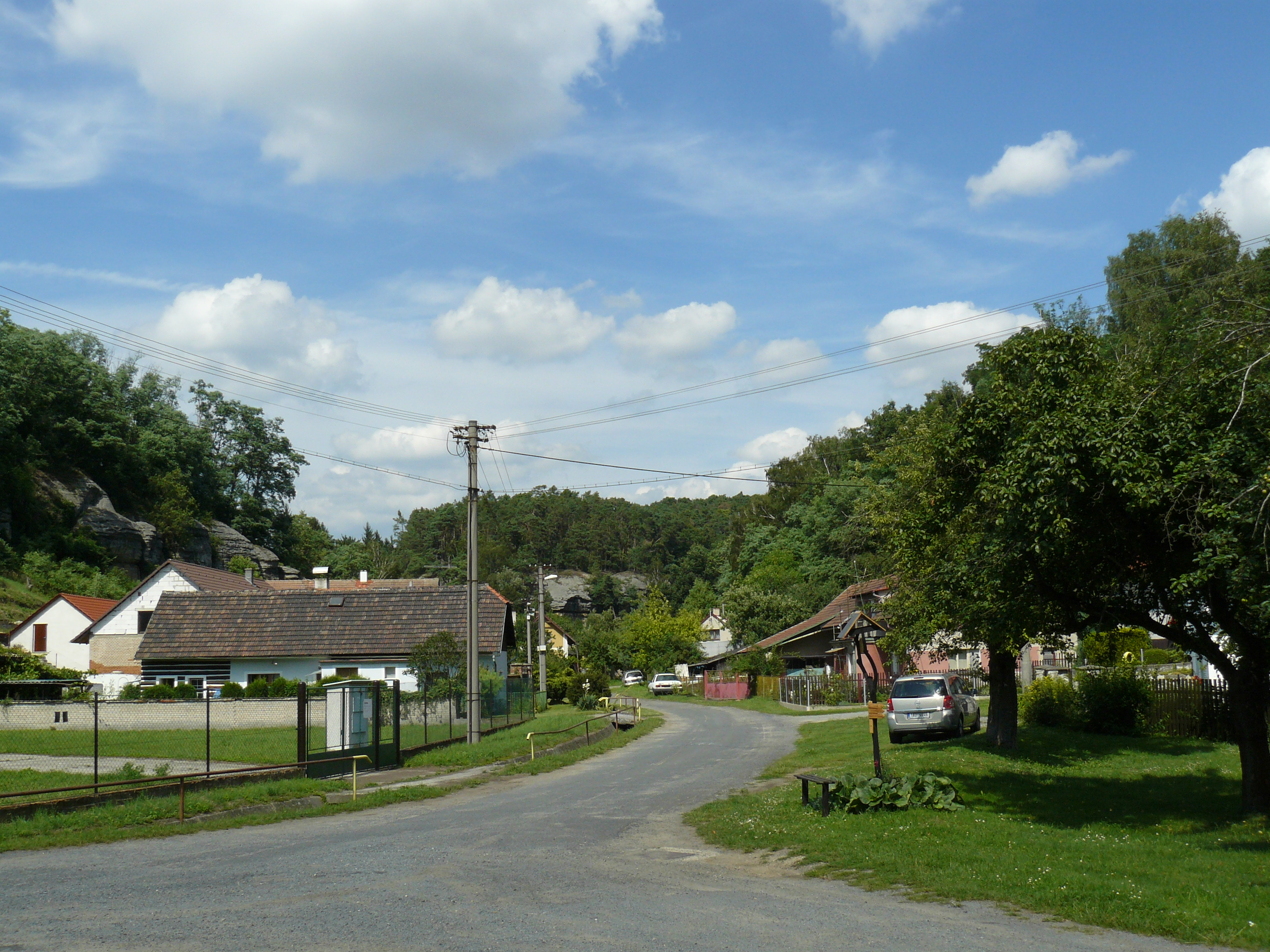
- Northeastern part of Lhotka

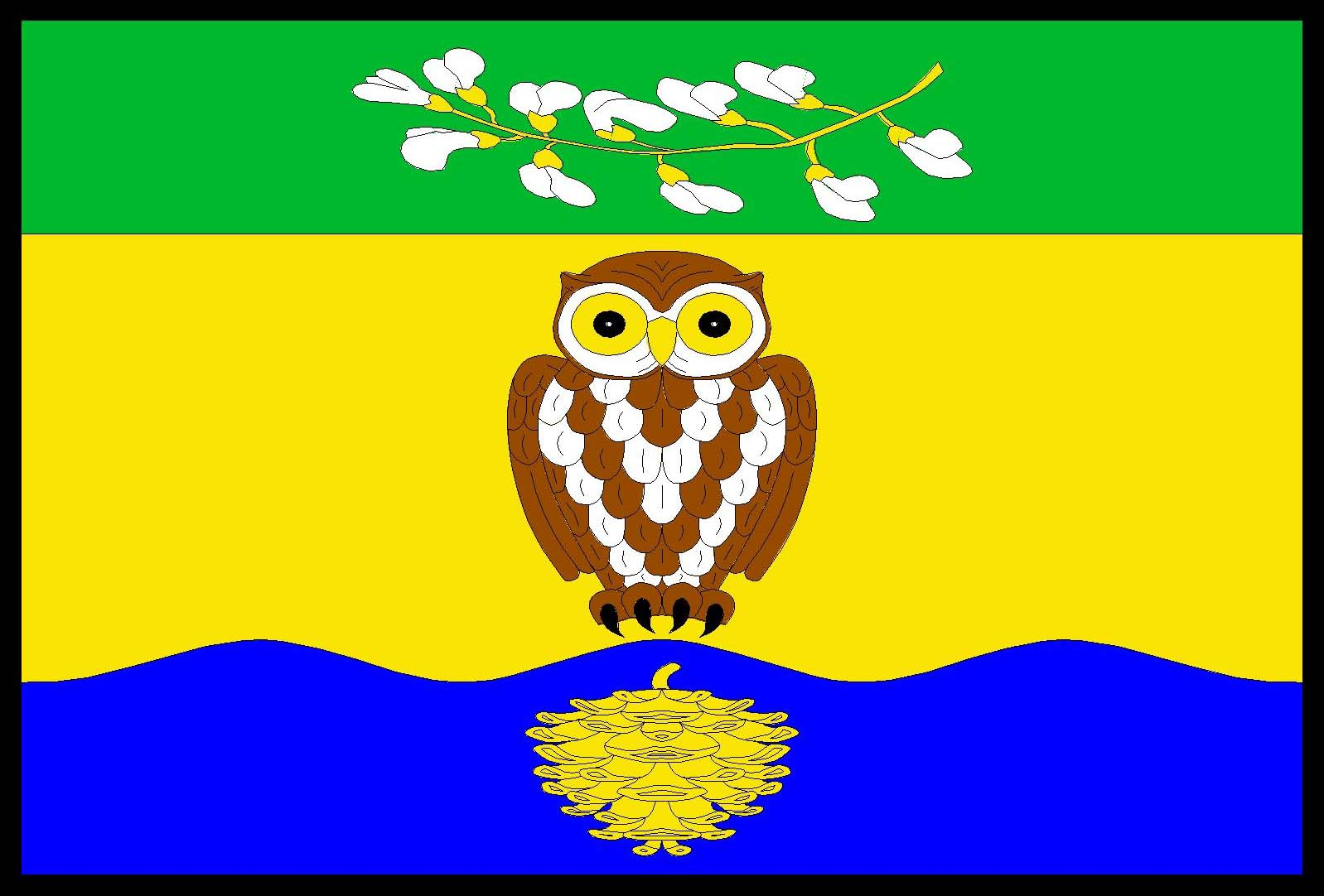
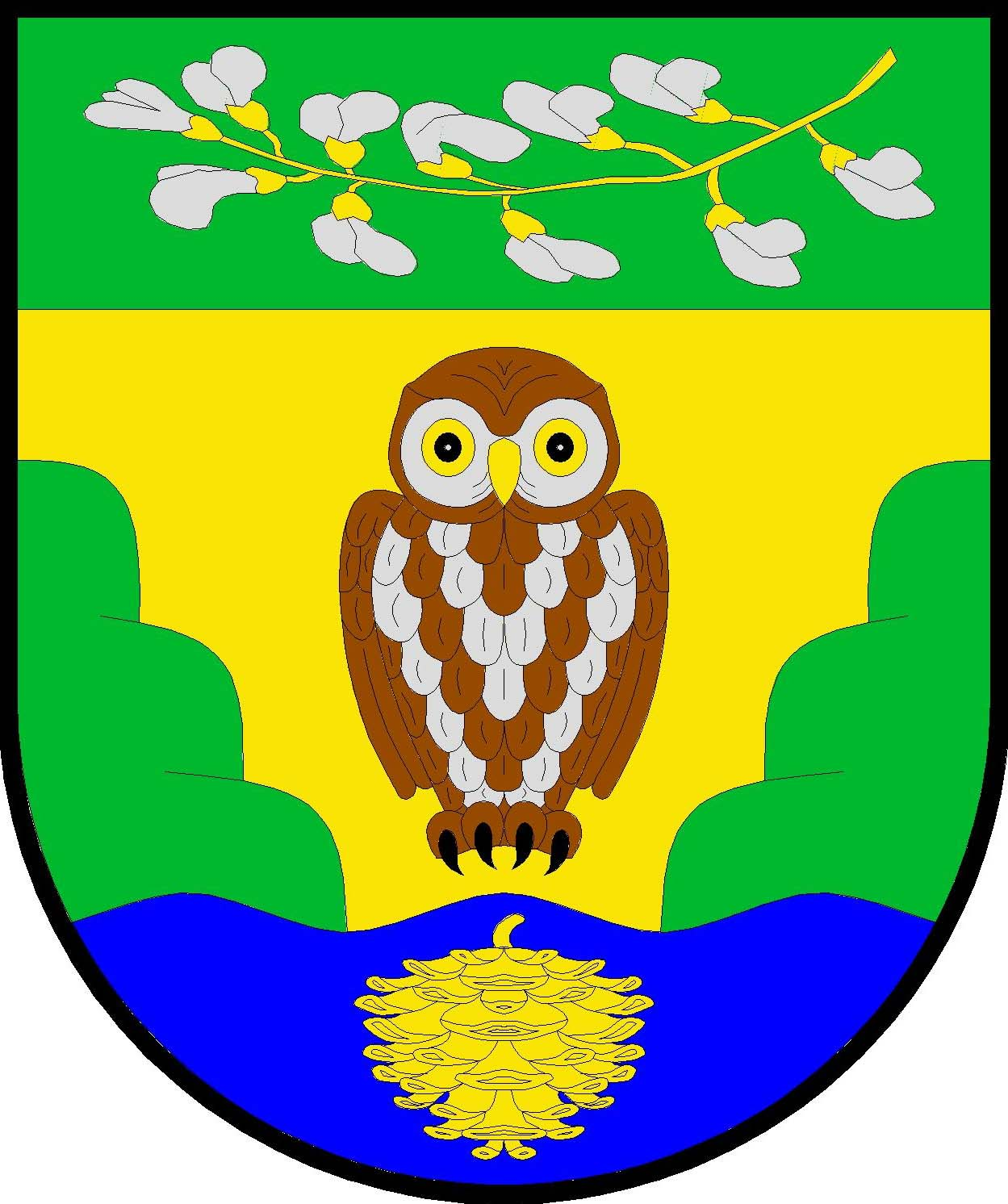
- Flag Coat of arms

- Location in the Czech Republic
- Coordinates: 50°22′17″N 14°32′56″E
- Country: Czech Republic
- Region: Central Bohemian
- District: Mělník
- First mentioned: 1318

Area
  - Total: 5.33 km^{2} (2.06 sq mi)
- Elevation: 205 m (673 ft)

Population (2026-01-01)
  - Total: 334
  - Density: 62.7/km^{2} (162/sq mi)
- Time zone: UTC+1 (CET)
  - Summer (DST): UTC+2 (CEST)
- Postal code: 277 31
- Website: www.lhotka.cz

Lhotka is a municipality and village in Mělník District in the Central Bohemian Region of the Czech Republic. It has about 300 inhabitants.

== Administrative division ==
Lhotka consists of two municipal parts (in brackets population according to the 2021 census):

- Lhotka (259)
- Hleďsebe (64)

== Demographics ==
Historical population
Year	Pop.	±%
1869	385	—
1880	413	+7.3%
1890	411	−0.5%
1900	429	+4.4%
1910	423	−1.4%
1921	527	+24.6%
1930	504	−4.4%
1950	456	−9.5%
1961	440	−3.5%
1970	366	−16.8%
1980	272	−25.7%
1991	197	−27.6%
2001	214	+8.6%
2011	310	+44.9%
2021	323	+4.2%
Source: Censuses
