= Jeviněves =

- Municipality
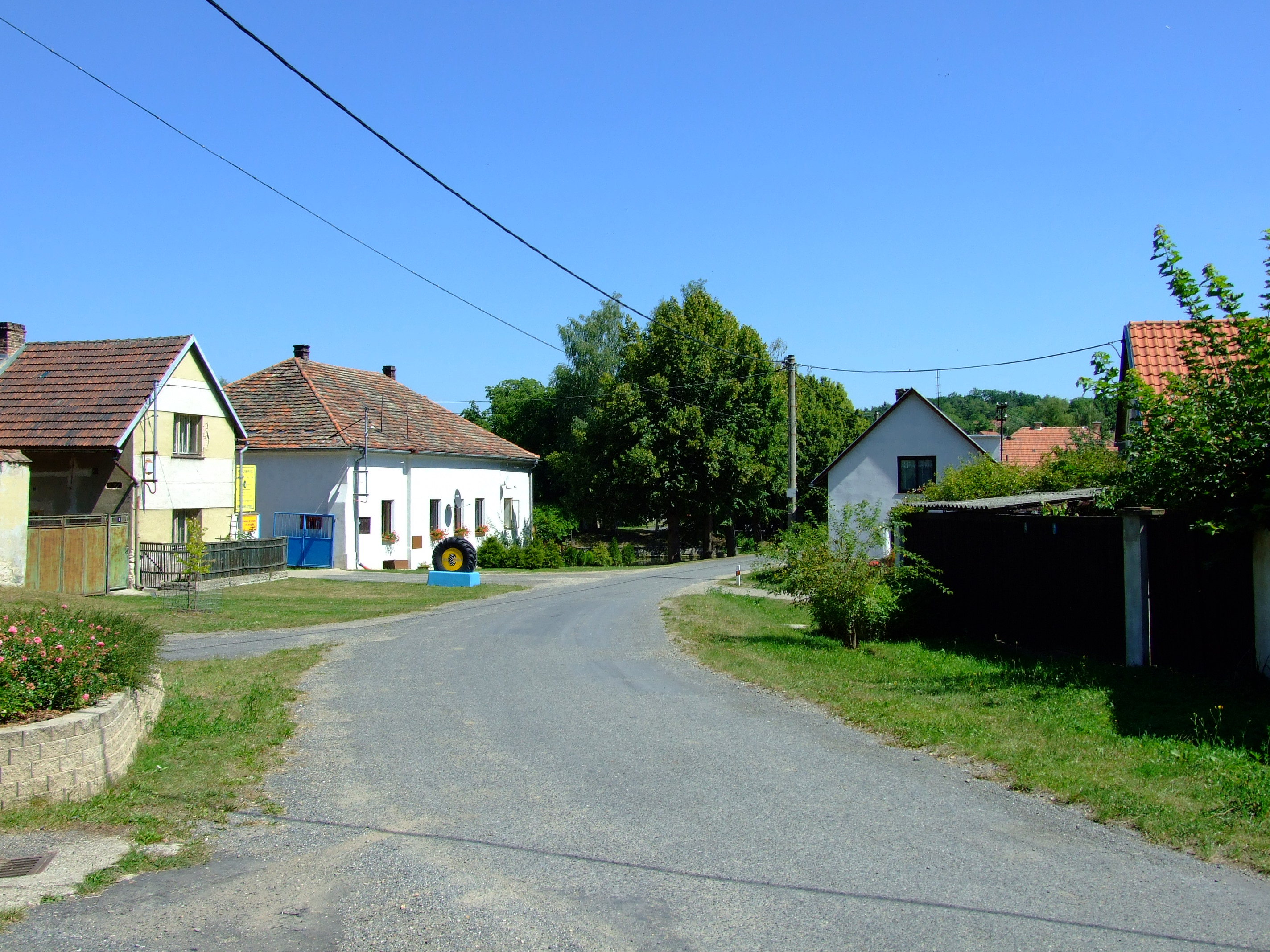
- A street in Jeviněves

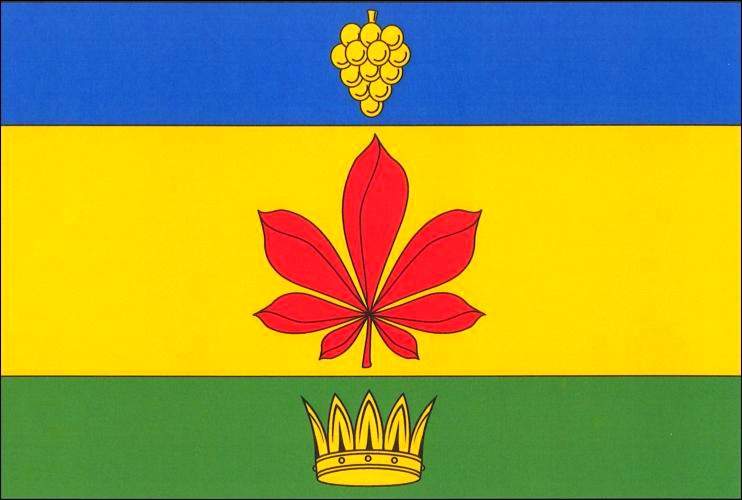
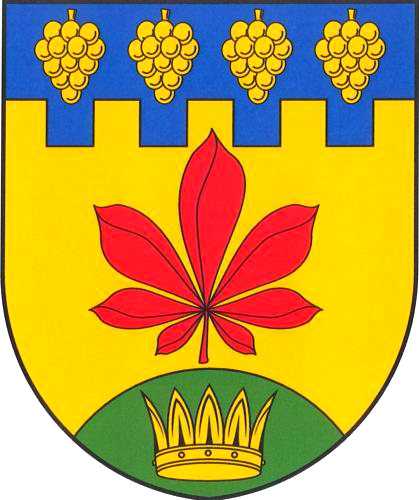
- Flag Coat of arms

- Location in the Czech Republic
- Coordinates: 50°20′43″N 14°20′17″E
- Country: Czech Republic
- Region: Central Bohemian
- District: Mělník
- First mentioned: 1374

Area
  - Total: 5.13 km^{2} (1.98 sq mi)
- Elevation: 212 m (696 ft)

Population (2026-01-01)
  - Total: 279
  - Density: 54.4/km^{2} (141/sq mi)
- Time zone: UTC+1 (CET)
  - Summer (DST): UTC+2 (CEST)
- Postal code: 277 05
- Website: www.jevineves.cz

Jeviněves is a municipality and village in Mělník District in the Central Bohemian Region of the Czech Republic. It has about 300 inhabitants.

== Demographics ==
Historical population
Year	Pop.	±%
1869	362	—
1880	391	+8.0%
1890	489	+25.1%
1900	465	−4.9%
1910	509	+9.5%
1921	500	−1.8%
1930	470	−6.0%
1950	398	−15.3%
1961	405	+1.8%
1970	352	−13.1%
1980	240	−31.8%
1991	181	−24.6%
2001	154	−14.9%
2011	216	+40.3%
2021	269	+24.5%
Source: Censuses
