= Stránka =

- Municipality
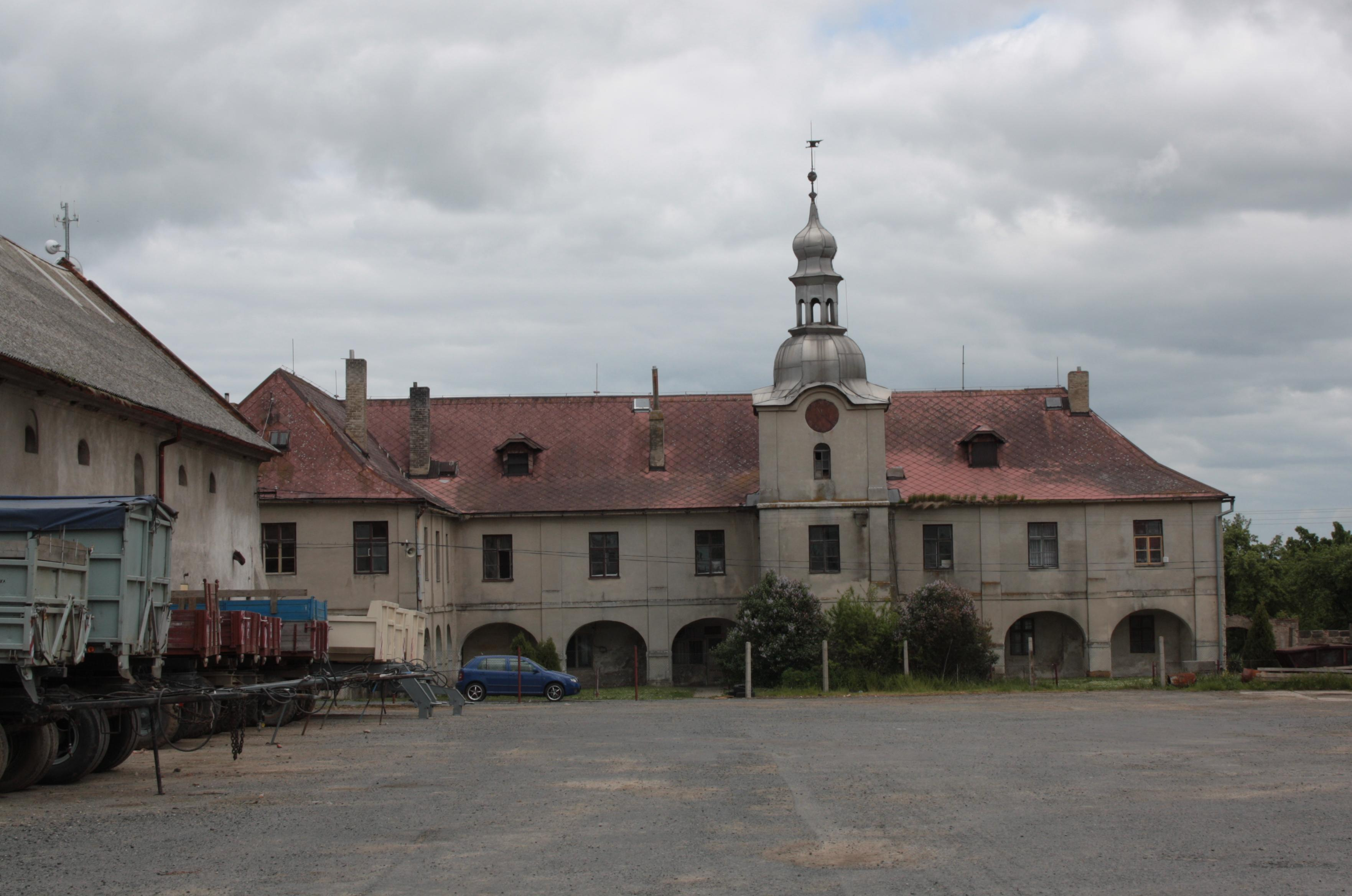
- Stránka Castle

- Location in the Czech Republic
- Coordinates: 50°25′23″N 14°39′40″E
- Country: Czech Republic
- Region: Central Bohemian
- District: Mělník
- First mentioned: 1357

Area
  - Total: 8.79 km^{2} (3.39 sq mi)
- Elevation: 309 m (1,014 ft)

Population (2026-01-01)
  - Total: 213
  - Density: 24.2/km^{2} (62.8/sq mi)
- Time zone: UTC+1 (CET)
  - Summer (DST): UTC+2 (CEST)
- Postal code: 277 35
- Website: www.oustranka.cz

Stránka is a municipality and village in Mělník District in the Central Bohemian Region of the Czech Republic. It has about 200 inhabitants.

== Administrative division ==
Stránka consists of three municipal parts (in brackets population according to the 2021 census):

- Stránka (184)
- Ostrý (14)
- Tajná (8)

== Demographics ==
Historical population
Year	Pop.	±%
1869	630	—
1880	654	+3.8%
1890	627	−4.1%
1900	608	−3.0%
1910	630	+3.6%
1921	637	+1.1%
1930	564	−11.5%
1950	379	−32.8%
1961	368	−2.9%
1970	318	−13.6%
1980	256	−19.5%
1991	234	−8.6%
2001	218	−6.8%
2011	205	−6.0%
2021	206	+0.5%
Source: Censuses
