= Hostín =

- Municipality
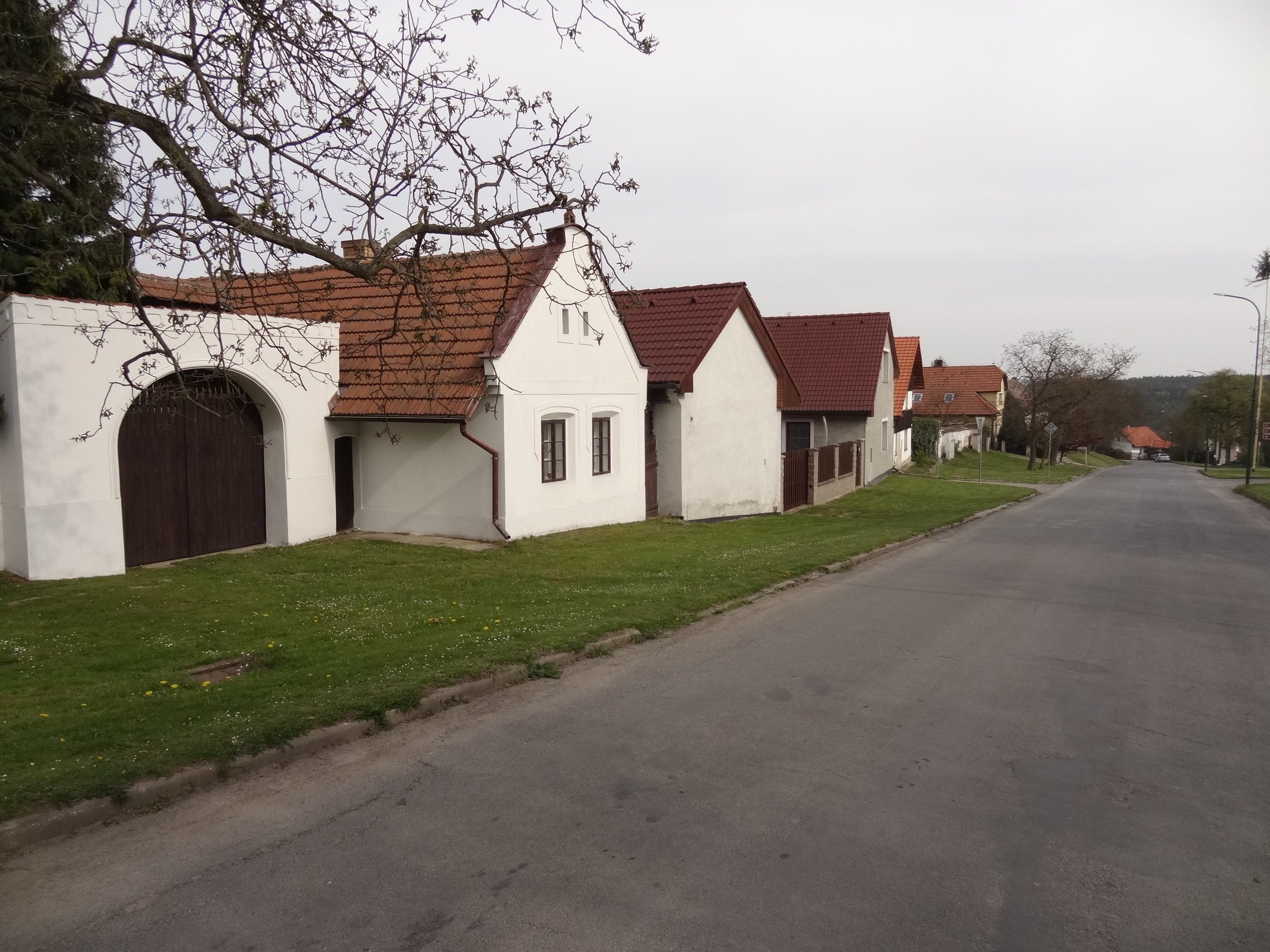
- Lower part of the common

- Location in the Czech Republic
- Coordinates: 50°20′26″N 14°35′20″E
- Country: Czech Republic
- Region: Central Bohemian
- District: Mělník
- First mentioned: 1345

Area
  - Total: 6.36 km^{2} (2.46 sq mi)
- Elevation: 284 m (932 ft)

Population (2026-01-01)
  - Total: 309
  - Density: 48.6/km^{2} (126/sq mi)
- Time zone: UTC+1 (CET)
  - Summer (DST): UTC+2 (CEST)
- Postal code: 277 32
- Website: www.hostin.cz

Hostín is a municipality and village in Mělník District in the Central Bohemian Region of the Czech Republic. It has about 300 inhabitants.

== Demographics ==
Historical population
Year	Pop.	±%
1869	470	—
1880	474	+0.9%
1890	494	+4.2%
1900	476	−3.6%
1910	450	−5.5%
1921	403	−10.4%
1930	432	+7.2%
1950	314	−27.3%
1961	294	−6.4%
1970	279	−5.1%
1980	261	−6.5%
1991	235	−10.0%
2001	214	−8.9%
2011	261	+22.0%
2021	302	+15.7%
Source: Censuses
