= Prague metropolitan area =

Metropolitan area in Czechia

Prague metropolitan area Pražská metropolitní oblast
- Metropolitan area
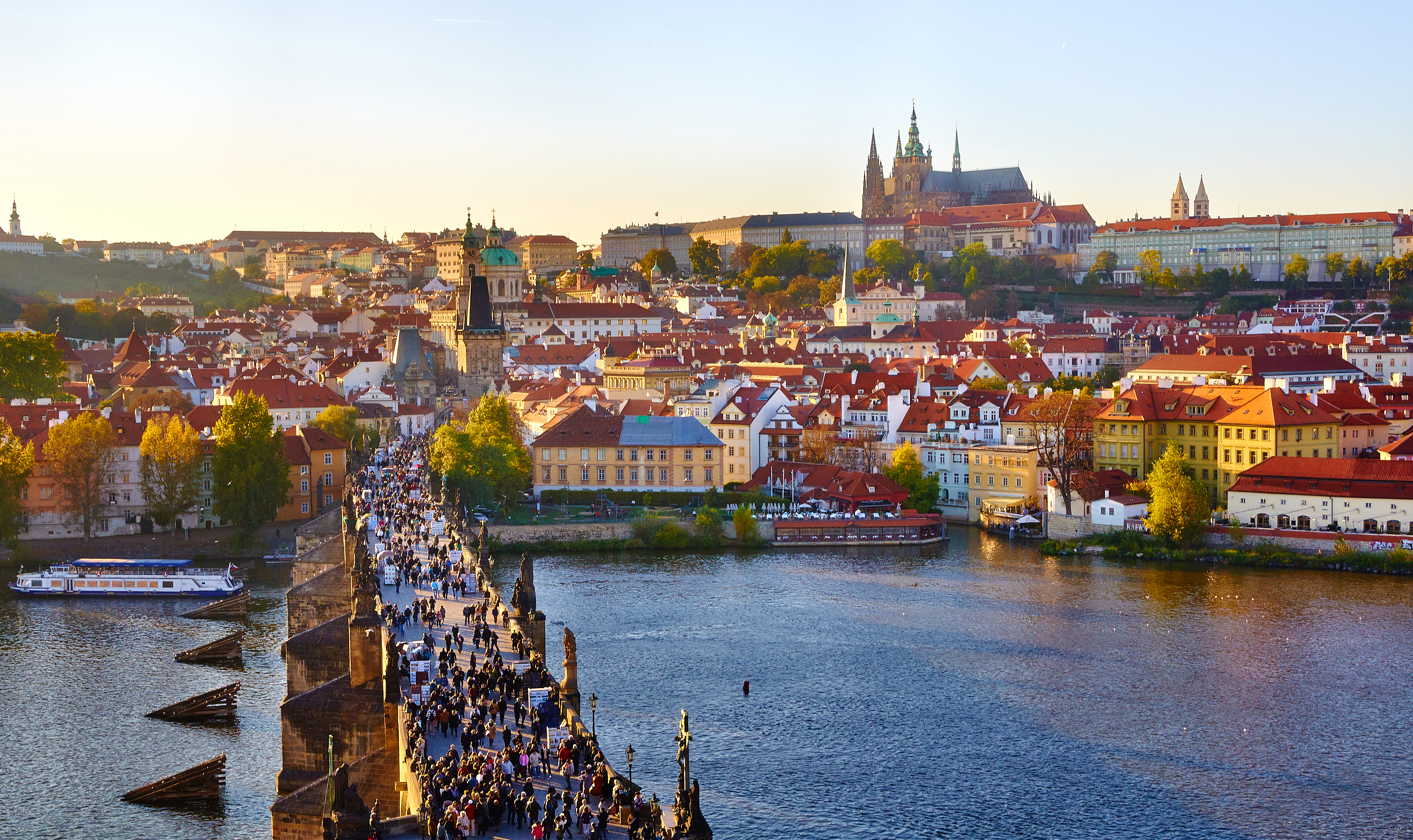
- Skyline of Prague

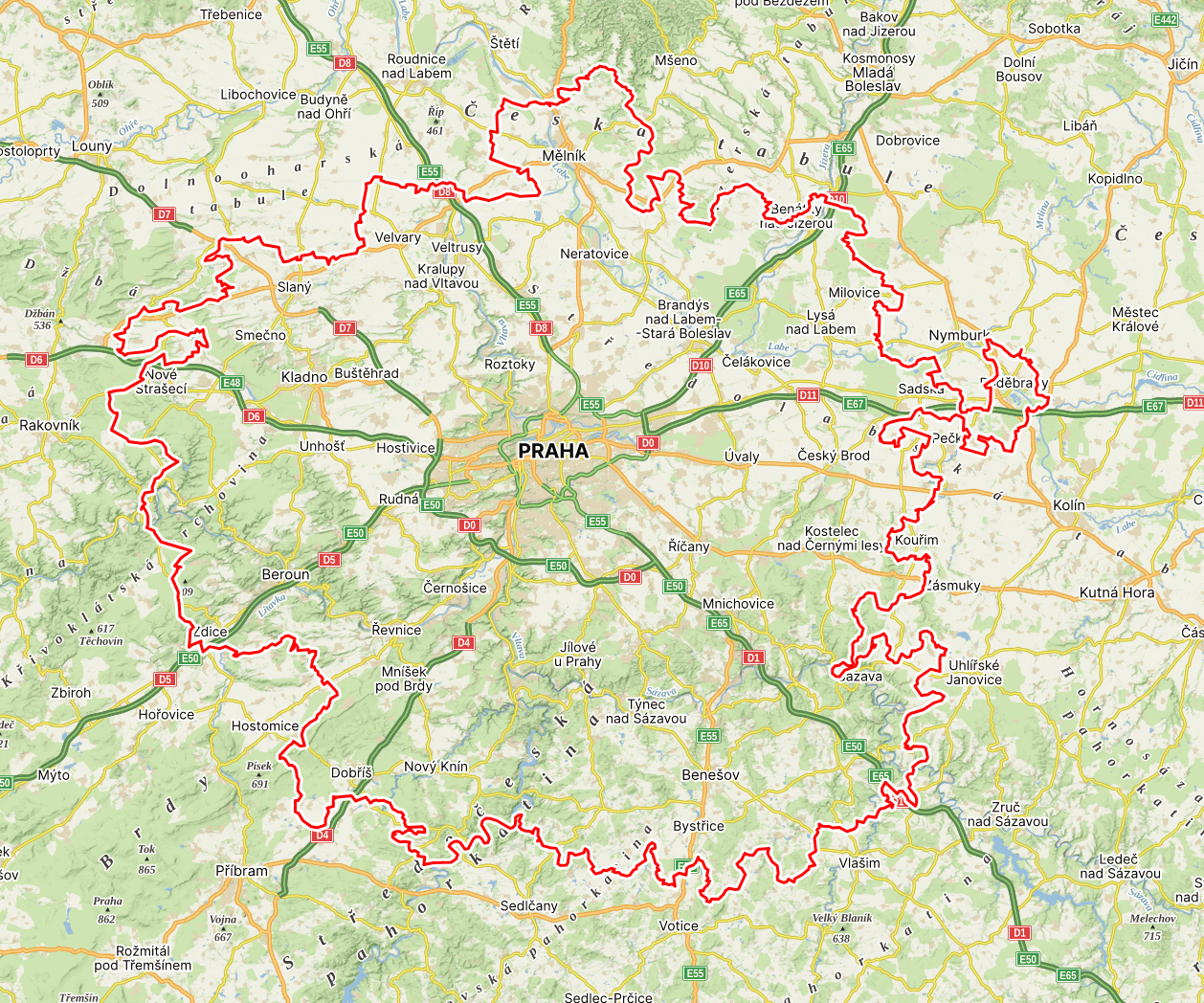
- Prague metropolitan area (red outline)
- Coordinates: 50°5′N 14°25′E
- Country: Czech Republic
- Largest city: Prague

Area
  - Metro: 4,822 km^{2} (1,862 sq mi)

Population (2024)
  - Metro: 2,264,690
  - Metro density: 469.7/km^{2} (1,216/sq mi)

GDP
  - Metro: €109.990 billion (2022)
- Time zone: UTC+1 (CET)
- Website: rsk-sk.cz/integrovane-nastroje/iti-prazske-metropolitni-oblasti/

The Prague metropolitan area (Czech: Pražská metropolitní oblast) is the metropolitan area of Prague, the capital city of the Czech Republic. The population is 2,264,690 as of 2024. It is the most populous metropolitan area in the country.

== Economy ==
In 2021, Prague's gross metropolitan product was €92.3 billion. This puts Prague in 24th place among cities in the European Union.

== Municipalities ==
The metropolitan area has 491 municipalities.

Historical population
Year	Pop.	±%
1950	1,613,575	—
1961	1,720,677	+6.6%
1970	1,730,570	+0.6%
1980	1,787,750	+3.3%
1991	1,800,663	+0.7%
2001	1,772,040	−1.6%
2011	2,017,284	+13.8%
2021	2,162,635	+7.2%
Source: Censuses

Name	Population (2024)
Babice	1,455
Bašť	3,062
Běleč	312
Běloky	184
Benátky nad Jizerou	7,877
Benešov	17,035
Beroun	21,272
Bílkovice	217
Blevice	285
Bojanovice	491
Borek	312
Borotice	426
Bořanovice	950
Brandýs nad Labem-Stará Boleslav	20,073
Brandýsek	2,256
Braškov	1,119
Bratronice	981
Bratřínov	203
Brázdim	712
Březí	654
Březová-Oleško	1,432
Břežany II	941
Bříství	392
Bubovice	583
Bukovany	819
Buš	333
Buštěhrad	3,995
Býkev	579
Bystřice	4,686
Byšice	1,437
Cítov	1,300
Cvrčovice	770
Čakov	128
Čakovičky	737
Čečelice	687
Čelákovice	12,463
Čerčany	3,134
Černé Voděrady	368
Černíky	172
Černolice	588
Černošice	7,675
Černuc	1,002
Červený Újezd	1,658
Český Brod	7,423
Český Šternberk	184
Čestlice	741
Číčovice	320
Čím	384
Čisovice	1,182
Čtyřkoly	783
Davle	1,833
Divišov	1,810
Dobročovice	337
Dobrovíz	569
Dobřejovice	1,324
Dobříč	478
Dobřichovice	3,776
Dobříš	8,867
Doksy	1,733
Dolany nad Vltavou	950
Dolany	286
Dolní Beřkovice	1,588
Dolní Břežany	4,694
Dolní Slivno	384
Doubek	475
Doubravčice	1,353
Drahelčice	1,566
Drahňovice	115
Drevníky	386
Drnek	186
Družec	1,077
Dřetovice	448
Dřevčice	776
Dřínov	517
Dřísy	1,084
Herink	1,089
Hlásná Třebaň	1,217
Hlavenec	521
Holubice	2,163
Horní Bezděkov	741
Horní Slivno	346
Horoměřice	5,405
Horoušany	1,965
Hořín	952
Hostín u Vojkovic	392
Hostivice	9,155
Hostouň	1,561
Hovorčovice	2,566
Hradečno	534
Hradešín	575
Hradištko (Nymburk District)	816
Hradištko (Prague-West District)	2,469
Hrdlív	518
Hrusice	926
Hřebeč	2,170
Hudlice	1,251
Husinec	1,581
Hvězdonice	341
Hvozdnice	593
Hýskov	2,209
Chářovice	221
Chleby	49
Chlístov	465
Chlumín	497
Chocerady	1,361
Choratice	65
Choteč	379
Chotilsko	608
Chotýšany	674
Chrást	532
Chrášťany (Benešov District)	255
Chrášťany (Kolín District)	777
Chrášťany (Prague-West District)	1,166
Chrustenice	1,093
Chržín	318
Chvatěruby	572
Chyňava	1,886
Chýně	4,817
Chýnice	437
Jemníky	285
Jeneč	1,337
Jenštejn	1,475
Jesenice	10,483
Jevany	856
Jílové u Prahy	5,227
Jíloviště	709
Jinočany	2,295
Jirny	3,218
Jiřice	325
Kačice	1,245
Kaliště	381
Kamenice	5,142
Kamenné Žehrovice	1,630
Kamenný Most	410
Kamenný Přívoz	1,579
Káraný	823
Karlík	487
Karlštejn	815
Kladno	69,078
Klecany	3,861
Klíčany	610
Klínec	816
Klokočná	287
Klučov	1,116
Kly	1,733
Kněževes	653
Knovíz	573
Kochánky	518
Kojetice	964
Koleč	600
Koněprusy	257
Konětopy	333
Konojedy	282
Korkyně	161
Korno	124
Kosoř	877
Kostelec nad Černými lesy	4,194
Kostelec nad Labem	4,336
Kostelec u Křížků	765
Kostelní Hlavno	519
Kostelní Lhota	915
Kounice	1,703
Kozmice	427
Kozojedy	976
Kozomín	478
Královice	279
Kralupy nad Vltavou	18,782
Králův Dvůr	10,613
Krhanice	1,113
Krňany	500
Krupá	409
Křečovice	828
Křenek	324
Křenice	1,031
Křivoklát	678
Křížkový Újezdec	320
Kšely	235
Kunice	1,884
Kutrovice	107
Květnice	1,993
Kvílice	89
Kyšice	618
Kytín	607
Lány	2,256
Lázně Toušeň	1,504
Ledce	484
Ledečko	237
Lešany	921
Lety	1,632
Lhota (Kladno District)	669
Lhota (Prague-East District)	506
Lhotka	330
Libčice nad Vltavou	3,577
Libeř	1,623
Líbeznice	3,211
Libež	264
Libiš	2,415
Libochovičky	81
Libovice	385
Libušín	3,588
Lidice	566
Lichoceves	413
Líšnice	797
Liteň	1,245
Litichovice	73
Loděnice	2,076
Louňovice	1,247
Lštění	498
Lužce	141
Lysá nad Labem	10,062
Makotřasy	534
Malá Hraštice	1,145
Malé Kyšice	556
Malé Přítočno	307
Malíkovice	387
Malotice	362
Malý Újezd	1,149
Maršovice	787
Máslovice	384
Masojedy	113
Mečeříž	568
Měchenice	858
Mělník	20,350
Měňany	306
Měšice	2,195
Mezouň	586
Milovice	13,920
Mirošovice	1,491
Mnichovice	4,095
Mníšek pod Brdy	6,334
Modletice	634
Mochov	1,663
Mokrovraty	806
Mořina	937
Mořinka	167
Mrač	874
Mratín	1,416
Mrzky	167
Mšec	892
Mukařov	2,997
Nedomice	329
Nehvizdy	4,383
Nelahozeves	2,216
Nenačovice	304
Neprobylice	169
Neratovice	16,217
Nespeky	803
Nesvačily	177
Netvořice	1,183
Neuměřice	441
Neveklov	2,769
Nižbor	2,131
Nová Ves (Mělník District)	1,048
Nová Ves (Prague-East District)	1,518
Nová Ves pod Pleší	1,559
Nové Dvory	268
Nové Strašecí	5,684
Nový Jáchymov	749
Nový Knín	2,126
Nový Vestec	503
Nučice (Prague-East District)	380
Nučice (Prague-West District)	2,409
Nupaky	2,077
Obříství	1,698
Odolena Voda	6,455
Ohrobec	1,535
Okoř	111
Okrouhlo	808
Oleška	979
Olovnice	576
Ondřejov	1,863
Oplany	112
Ořech	979
Ostrá	625
Ostředek	477
Otročiněves	511
Otvovice	788
Ovčáry	514
Panenské Břežany	660
Pavlov	216
Pětihosty	264
Petroupim	376
Petrov	820
Petříkov	643
Pchery	2,044
Písty	433
Pletený Újezd	675
Poděbrady	15,156
Podlešín	332
Podolanka	604
Pohoří	434
Polerady	745
Popovičky	472
Poříčany	1,557
Poříčí nad Sázavou	1,632
Postřižín	1,950
Postupice	1,456
Prague	1,384,732
Průhonice	2,822
Prusice	92
Předboj	1,396
Předměřice nad Jizerou	1,038
Přehvozdí	334
Přelíc	394
Přerov nad Labem	1,252
Přestavlky u Čerčan	430
Přezletice	2,315
Přistoupim	461
Přišimasy	898
Psáry	4,226
Ptice	1,033
Pyšely	2,230
Rabyně	292
Račice	169
Radějovice	544
Radonice	1,122
Radošovice	406
Rataje nad Sázavou	544
Ratenice	663
Roblín	254
Rosovice	885
Rostoklaty	643
Roztoky	9,034
Ruda	816
Rudná	5,395
Rynholec	1,082
Řehenice	529
Řevnice	3,769
Říčany	16,955
Řisuty	412
Řitka	1,386
Sadská	3,253
Samopše	190
Sázava	3,875
Sazená	362
Sedlec	544
Semice	1,547
Senohraby	1,364
Sibřina	1,119
Skorkov	720
Skuhrov	597
Skvrňov	222
Slaný	16,740
Slapy	968
Slatina	635
Slověnice	49
Sluhy	739
Sluštice	757
Smečno	1,977
Soběhrdy	451
Soběšín	175
Sojovice	585
Sokoleč	1,121
Srbsko	561
Stará Huť	1,620
Stará Lysá	826
Starý Vestec	233
Statenice	1,562
Stehelčeves	1,163
Stochov	5,354
Strančice	2,852
Stranný	122
Stratov	730
Struhařov (Benešov District)	995
Struhařov (Prague-East District)	994
Středokluky	1,305
Střemy	479
Stříbrná Skalice	1,570
Studeněves	522
Sudovo Hlavno	522
Sulice	2,552
Svárov	603
Svatá	551
Svatý Jan pod Skalou	198
Svémyslice	577
Světice	1,446
Svinaře	947
Svinařov	740
Svojetice	1,323
Svrkyně	304
Sýkořice	583
Šestajovice	4,113
Škvorec	2,218
Štěchovice	2,224
Štíhlice	210
Tachlovice	949
Tatce	674
Tehov	1,165
Tehovec	646
Teplýšovice	546
Tetín	879
Tisem	215
Tismice	570
Tišice	2,526
Tmaň	1,250
Trnová	607
Trubín	575
Trubská	194
Třebestovice	1,319
Třebešice	116
Třebichovice	582
Třebíz	240
Třebotov	1,506
Třebovle	569
Třebusice	490
Třtice	512
Tuhaň	840
Tuchlovice	2,779
Tuchoměřice	1,733
Tuchoraz	728
Tuklaty	1,084
Tursko	930
Tuřany	708
Tuřice	500
Týnec nad Sázavou	5,717
Úholičky	810
Úhonice	1,238
Uhy	404
Újezdec	144
Únětice	925
Unhošť	5,206
Úvaly	7,504
Úžice (Kutná Hora District)	719
Úžice (Mělník District)	1,123
Václavice	632
Veleň	1,987
Velenka	351
Veliká Ves	394
Velká Dobrá	1,799
Velká Lečice	197
Velké Popovice	3,375
Velké Přílepy	3,603
Velké Přítočno	1,088
Velký Borek	1,192
Veltrusy	2,297
Velvary	3,048
Vestec	3,120
Větrušice	707
Vinařice	2,117
Vitice	1,161
Vodochody	788
Vodslivy	98
Vojkovice	1,102
Vonoklasy	572
Voznice	710
Vrané nad Vltavou	2,679
Vranov	427
Vrátkov	291
Vráž	1,251
Vrbčany	419
Vrbová Lhota	581
Všechlapy	113
Všenory	1,741
Všestary	1,005
Všestudy	432
Všetaty	2,478
Vykáň	428
Vysoká	931
Vysoký Újezd (Benešov District)	189
Vysoký Újezd (Beroun District)	1,793
Vyšehořovice	689
Výžerky	186
Vyžlovka	799
Xaverov	57
Zadní Třebaň	982
Zahořany	355
Zájezd	138
Zákolany	625
Zálezlice	454
Zápy	924
Záryby	1,140
Zbečno	613
Zbožíčko	259
Zbuzany	1,445
Zdiby	3,961
Zdice	4,120
Zeleneč	3,203
Zlatá	428
Zlatníky-Hodkovice	1,388
Zlončice	582
Zlonín	1,331
Zlosyň	492
Zvánovice	588
Zvole	1,961
Zvoleněves	912
Ždánice	367
Želenice	214
Železná	322
Žilina	836
Žižice	762
Županovice	73
Total	2,264,690

== See also ==
- List of EU metropolitan areas by GDP
