= Račice (Rakovník District) =

- Municipality
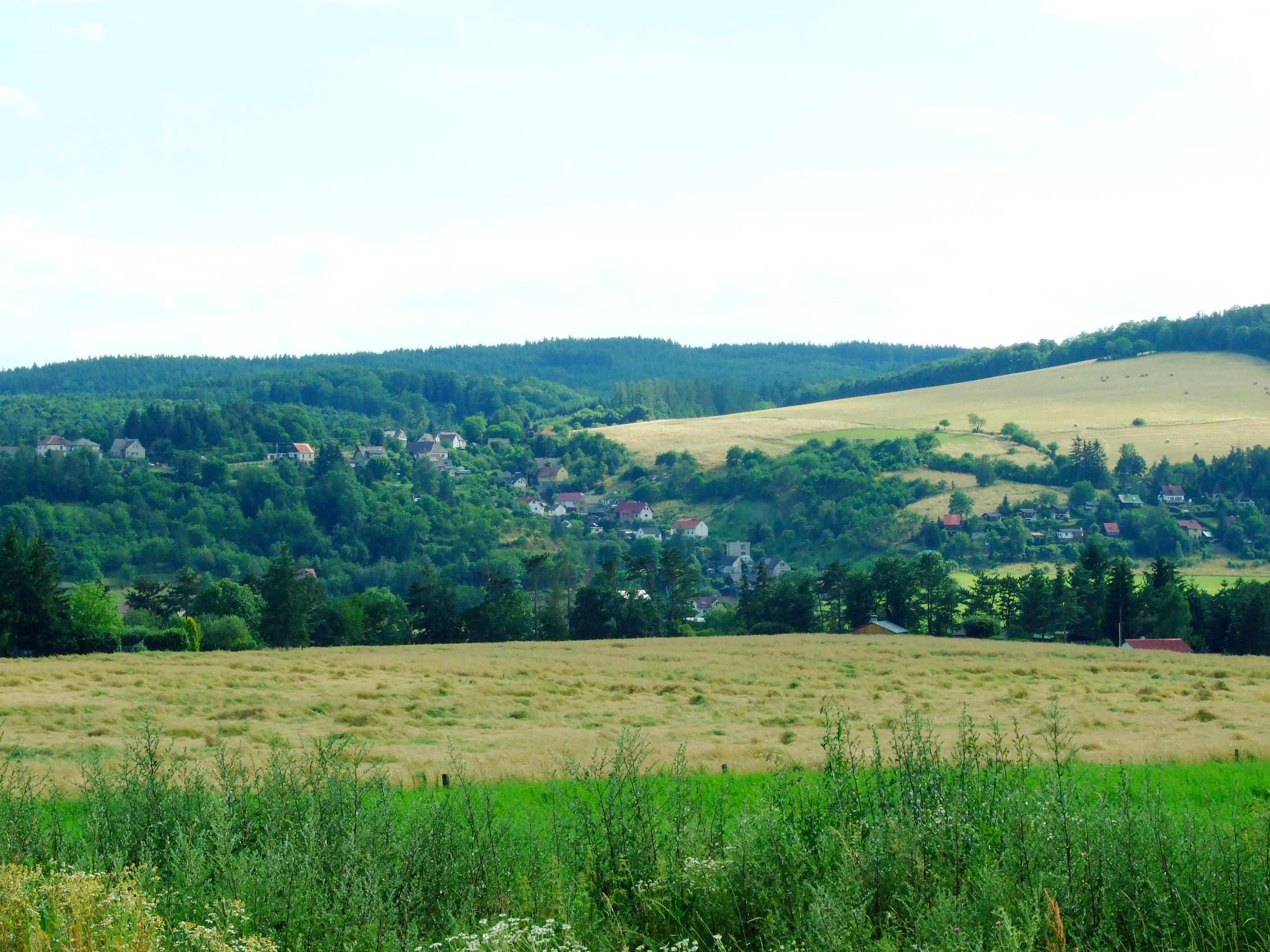
- View from the north

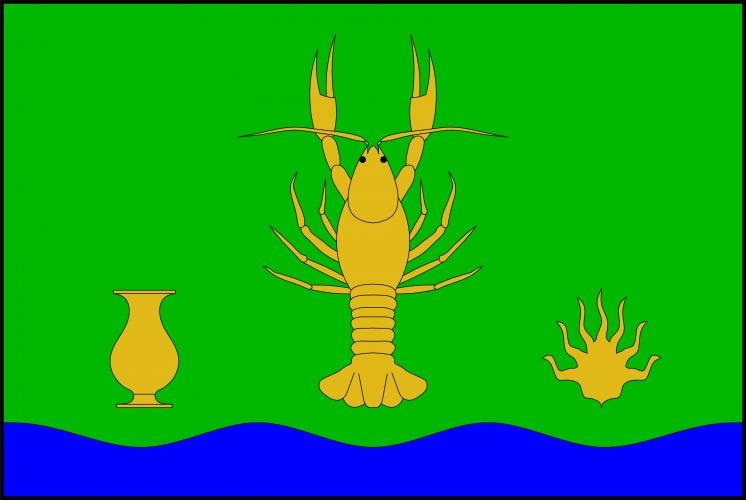
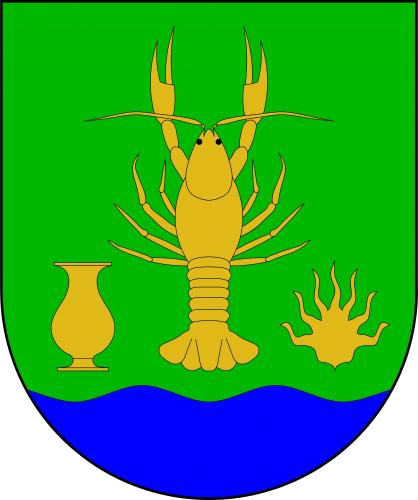
- Flag Coat of arms

- Location in the Czech Republic
- Coordinates: 50°1′29″N 13°55′23″E
- Country: Czech Republic
- Region: Central Bohemian
- District: Rakovník
- First mentioned: 1556

Area
  - Total: 9.83 km^{2} (3.80 sq mi)
- Elevation: 208 m (682 ft)

Population (2026-01-01)
  - Total: 175
  - Density: 17.8/km^{2} (46.1/sq mi)
- Time zone: UTC+1 (CET)
  - Summer (DST): UTC+2 (CEST)
- Postal code: 270 24
- Website: www.obec-racice.cz

Račice is a municipality and village in Rakovník District in the Central Bohemian Region of the Czech Republic. It has about 200 inhabitants. It lies on the Berounka River.

== Demographics ==
Historical population
Year	Pop.	±%
1869	222	—
1880	208	−6.3%
1890	236	+13.5%
1900	268	+13.6%
1910	236	−11.9%
1921	208	−11.9%
1930	218	+4.8%
1950	182	−16.5%
1961	195	+7.1%
1970	190	−2.6%
1980	160	−15.8%
1991	129	−19.4%
2001	153	+18.6%
2011	151	−1.3%
2021	162	+7.3%
Source: Censuses
