= Dřísy =

- Municipality
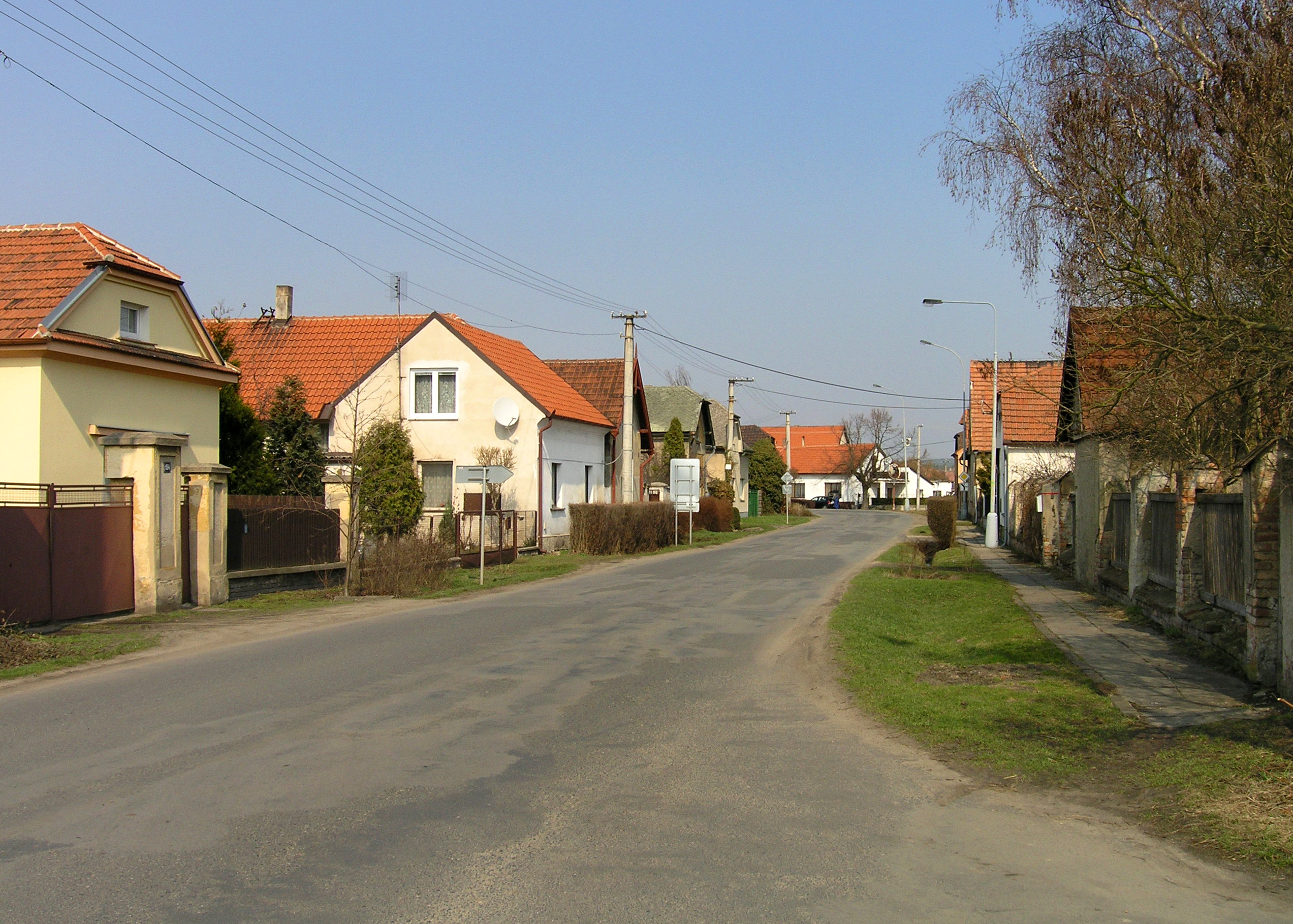
- Main street

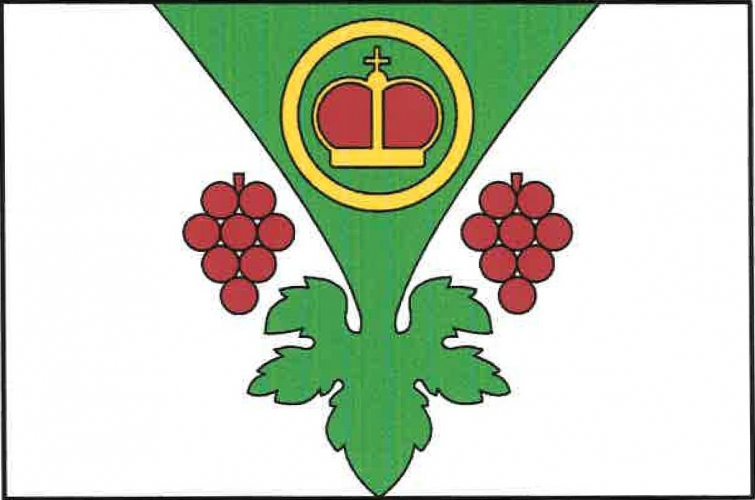
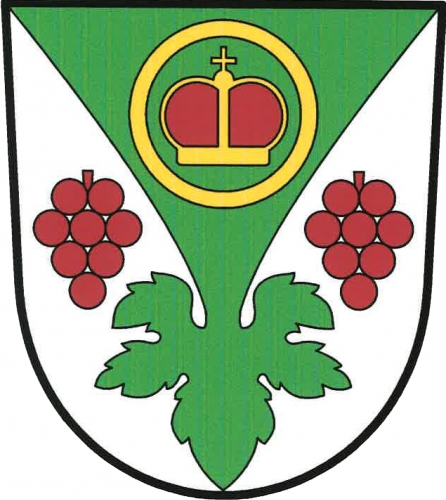
- Flag Coat of arms

- Location in the Czech Republic
- Coordinates: 50°15′22″N 14°38′37″E
- Country: Czech Republic
- Region: Central Bohemian
- District: Prague-East
- First mentioned: 1052

Area
  - Total: 8.44 km^{2} (3.26 sq mi)
- Elevation: 172 m (564 ft)

Population (2026-01-01)
  - Total: 1,111
  - Density: 132/km^{2} (341/sq mi)
- Time zone: UTC+1 (CET)
  - Summer (DST): UTC+2 (CEST)
- Postal code: 277 14
- Website: www.drisy.cz

Dřísy is a municipality and village in Prague-East District in the Central Bohemian Region of the Czech Republic. It has about 1,100 inhabitants.

== Demographics ==
Historical population
Year	Pop.	±%
1869	546	—
1880	591	+8.2%
1890	653	+10.5%
1900	594	−9.0%
1910	681	+14.6%
1921	775	+13.8%
1930	890	+14.8%
1950	874	−1.8%
1961	917	+4.9%
1970	858	−6.4%
1980	822	−4.2%
1991	721	−12.3%
2001	736	+2.1%
2011	897	+21.9%
2021	1,038	+15.7%
Source: Censuses
