= Mratín =

- Municipality
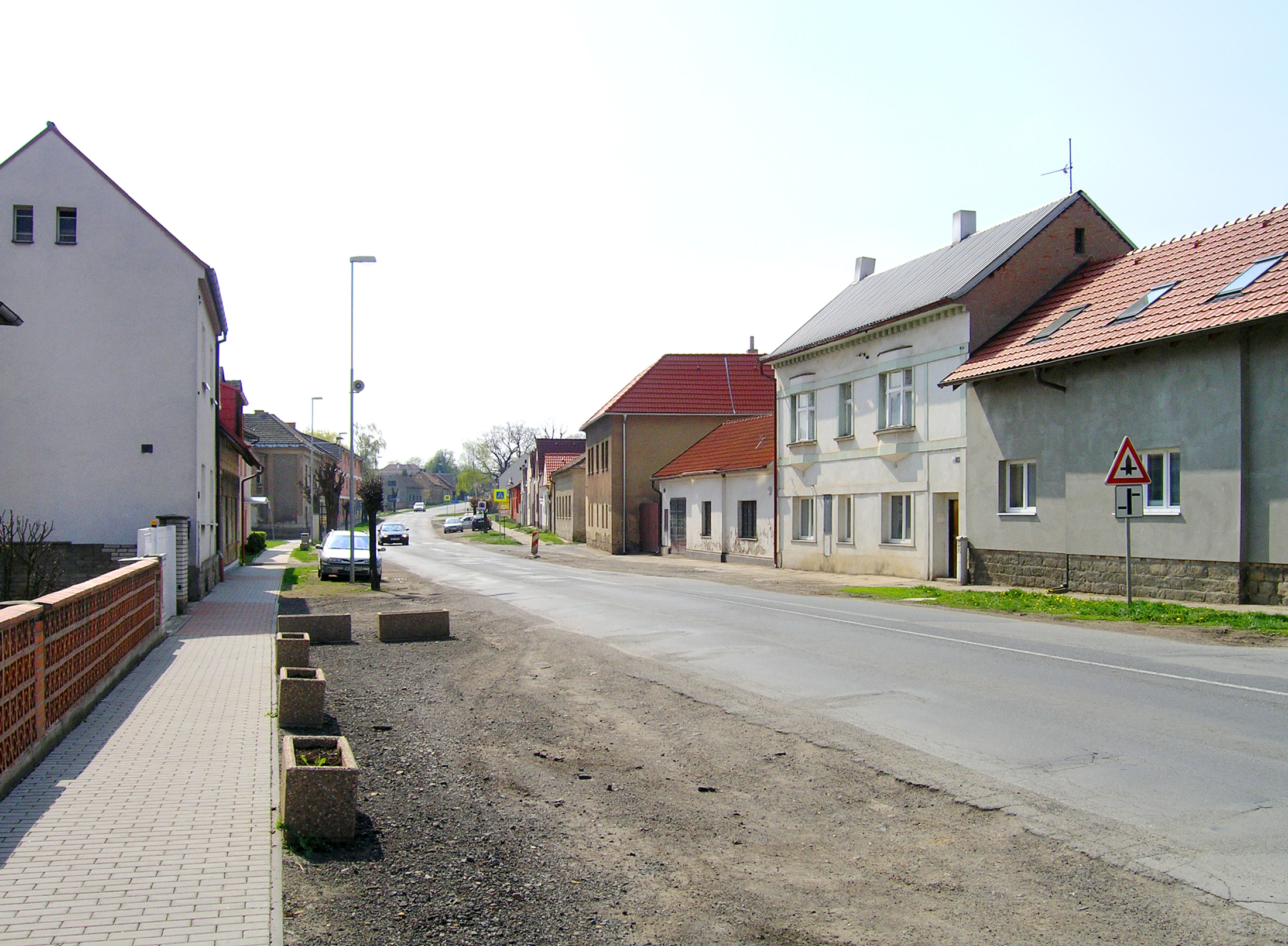
- Main street

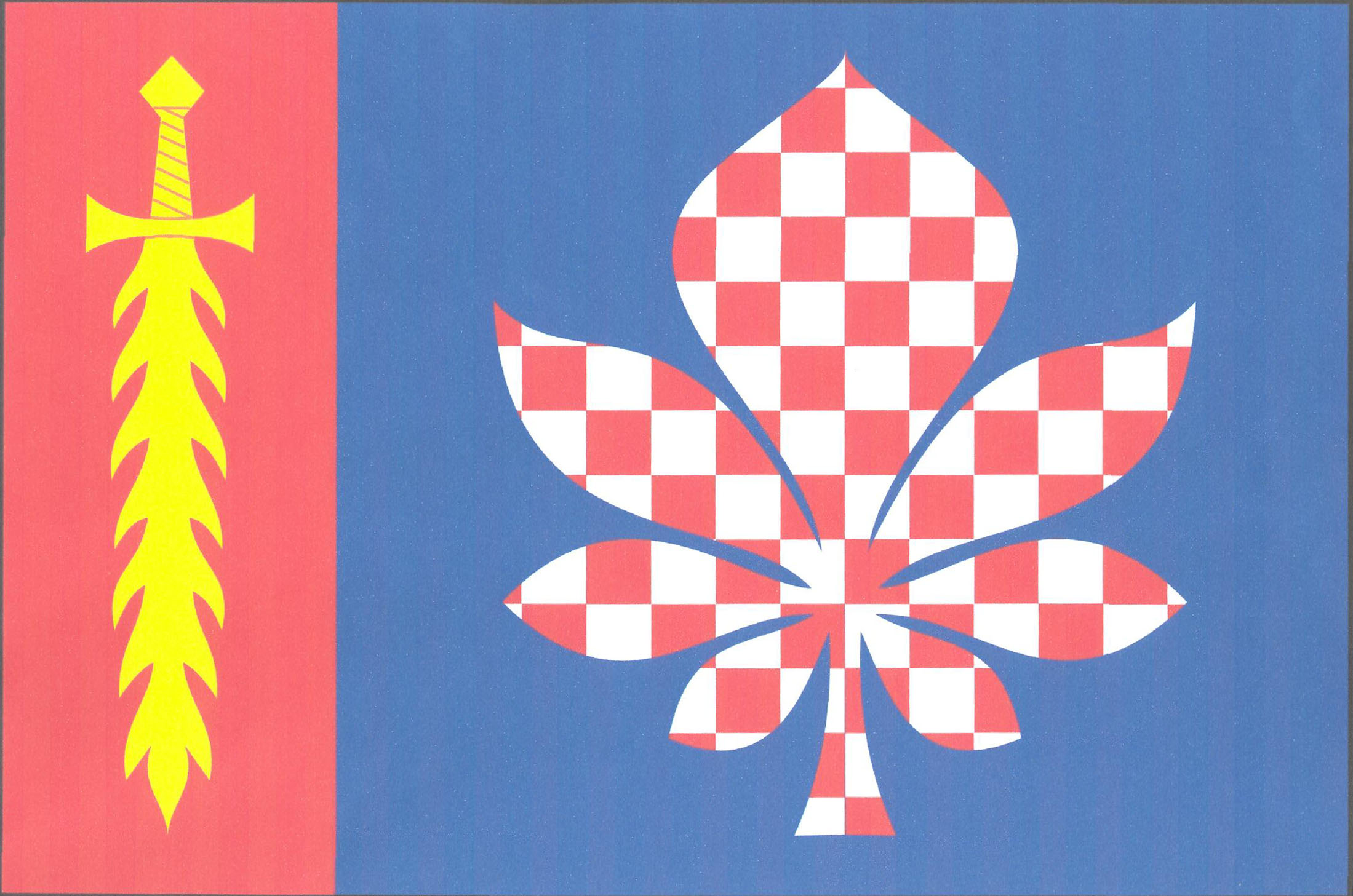
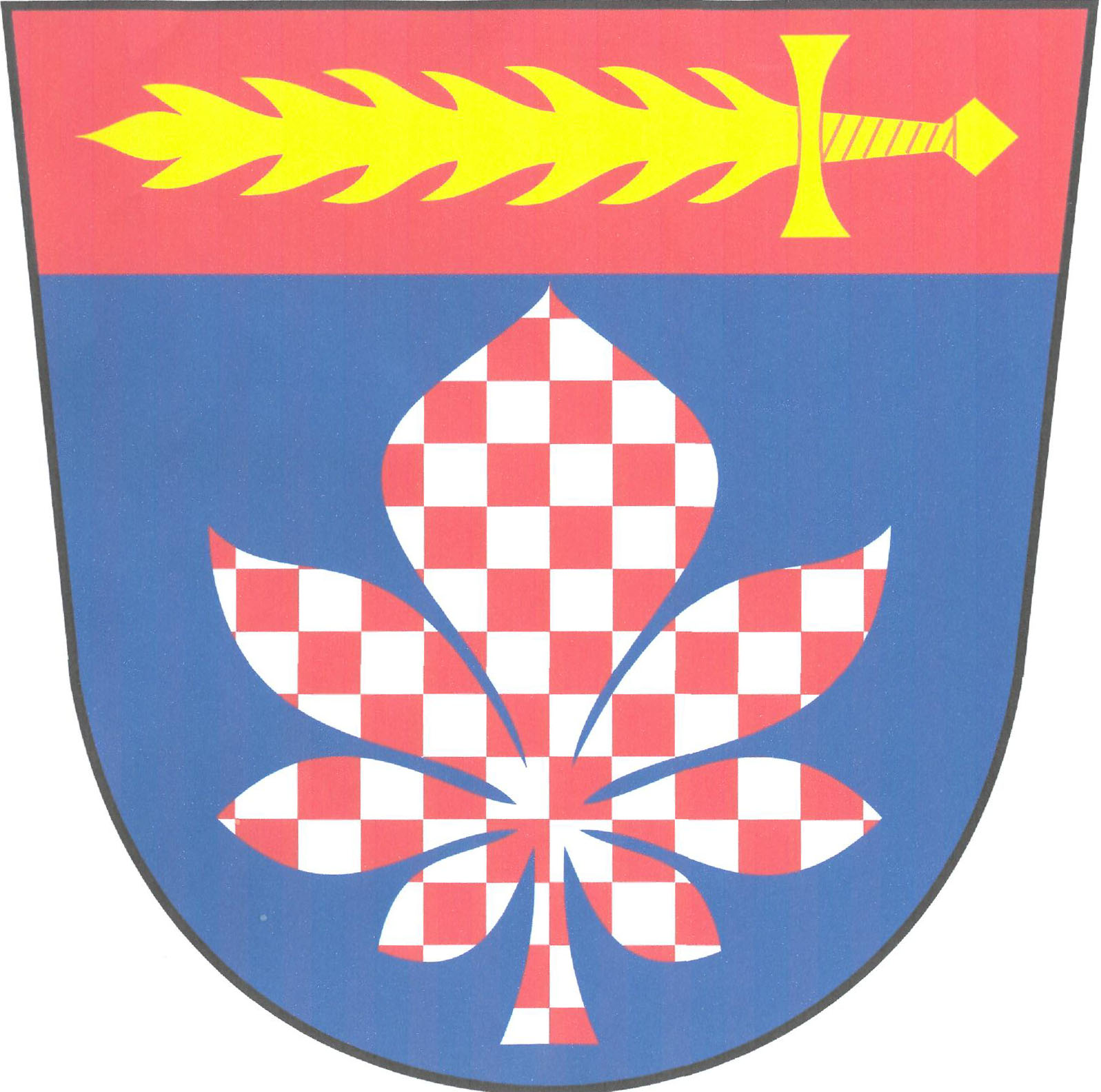
- Flag Coat of arms

- Location in the Czech Republic
- Coordinates: 50°12′11″N 14°33′4″E
- Country: Czech Republic
- Region: Central Bohemian
- District: Prague-East
- First mentioned: 1372

Area
  - Total: 4.90 km^{2} (1.89 sq mi)
- Elevation: 192 m (630 ft)

Population (2026-01-01)
  - Total: 1,394
  - Density: 284/km^{2} (737/sq mi)
- Time zone: UTC+1 (CET)
  - Summer (DST): UTC+2 (CEST)
- Postal code: 250 63
- Website: www.mratin.cz

Mratín is a municipality and village in Prague-East District in the Central Bohemian Region of the Czech Republic. It has about 1,400 inhabitants.

== Etymology ==
The name is derived from the personal name Mrata, meaning "Mrata's (court)".

== Geography ==
Mratín is located about 11 kilometres (7 mi) north of Prague. It lies in a flat agricultural landscape in the Central Elbe Table. The highest point is at 206 m (676 ft) above sea level. The stream Mratínský potok flows through the municipality. A system of three fishponds is located south of the village.

== History ==
The first written mention of Mratín is from 1372.

== Demographics ==
Historical population

Year	Pop.	±%
1869	530	—
1880	658	+24.2%
1890	781	+18.7%
1900	748	−4.2%
1910	764	+2.1%

Year	Pop.	±%
1921	717	−6.2%
1930	905	+26.2%
1950	641	−29.2%
1961	626	−2.3%
1970	584	−6.7%

Year	Pop.	±%
1980	541	−7.4%
1991	538	−0.6%
2001	570	+5.9%
2011	1,256	+120.4%
2021	1,464	+16.6%

Source: Censuses

== Transport ==
There are no railways or major roads passing through the municipality.

== Sights ==
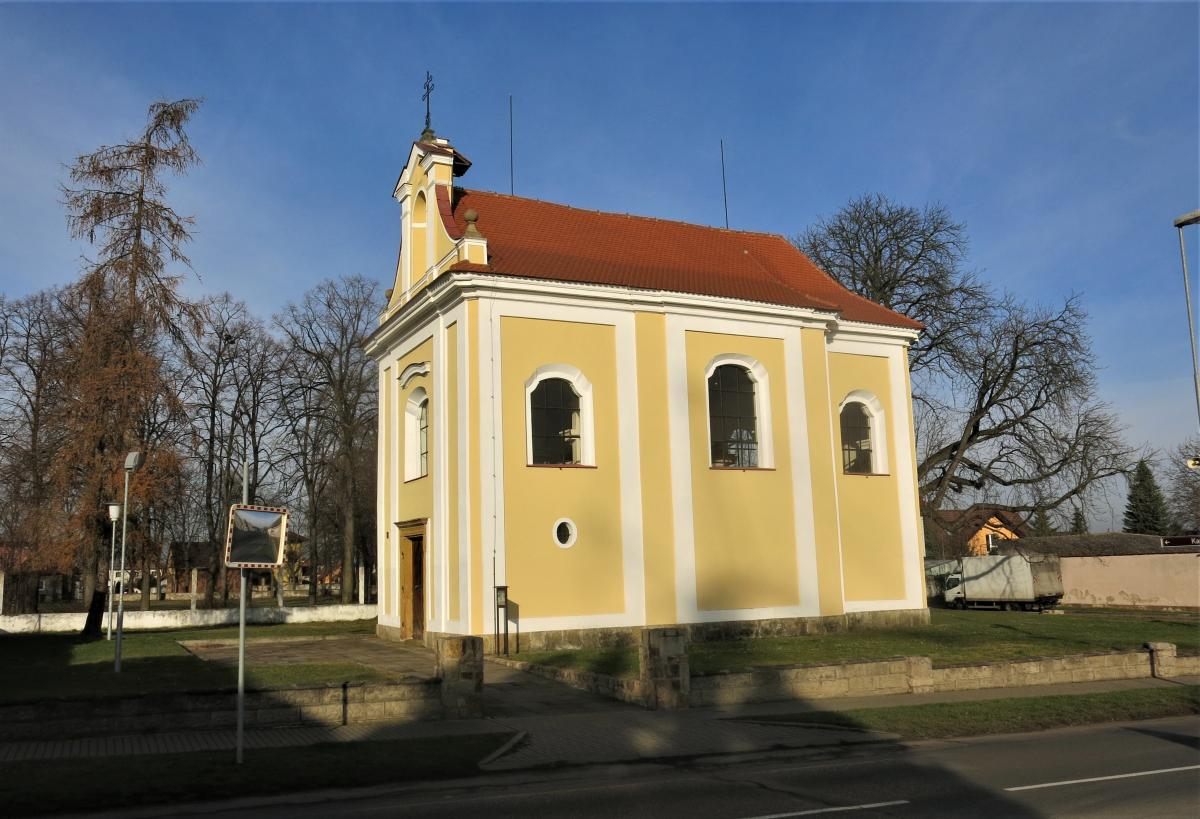
Chapel of Saint Michael the Archangel

The main landmark of Mratín is the Chapel of Saint Michael the Archangel. It was built in the Baroque style in the first half of the 18th century.

A historical monument is the small Baroque castle from the end of the 18th century. It has a Neoclassical façade. Today the building houses a kindergarten.
