= Písty =

- Municipality
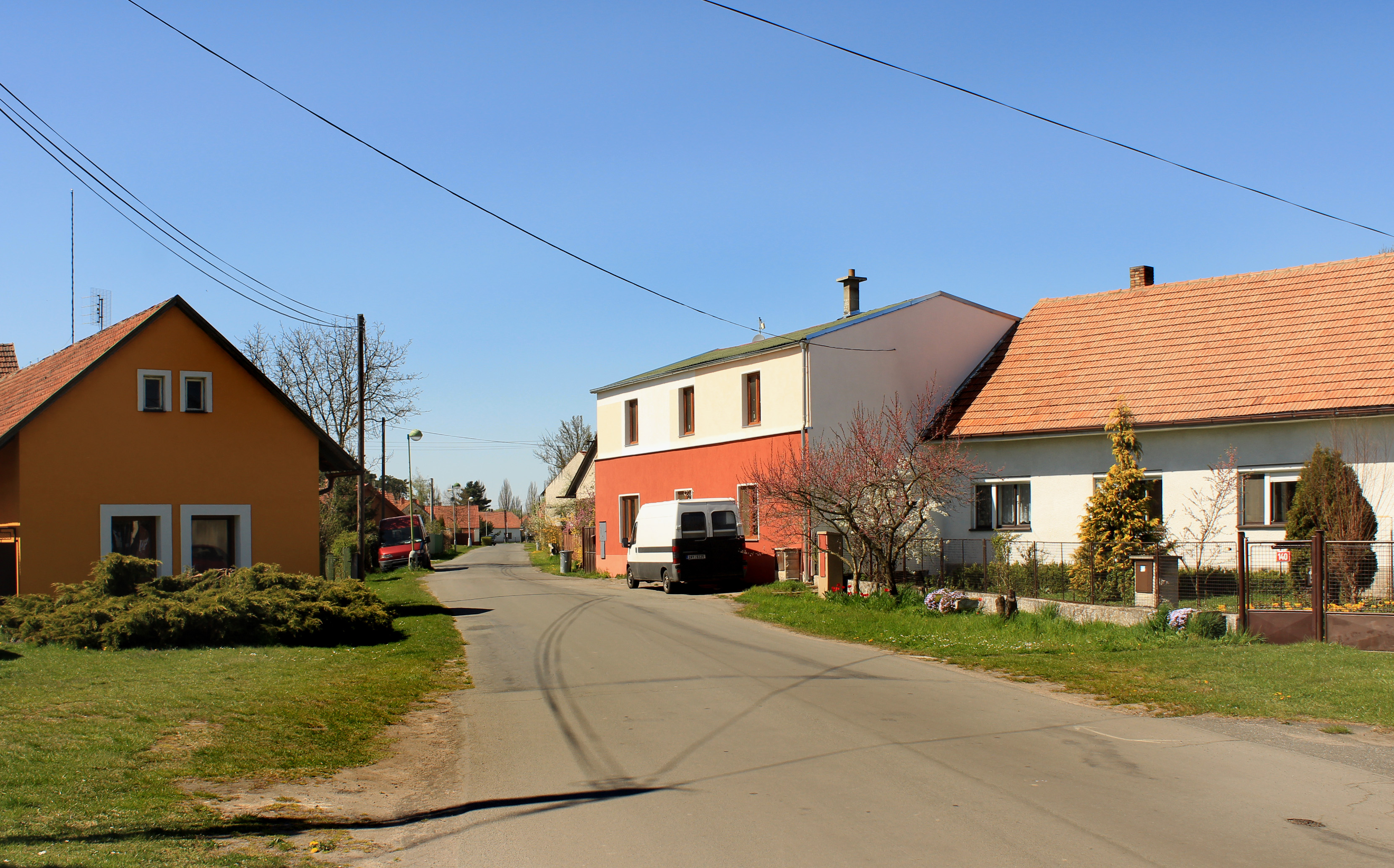
- Centre of Písty

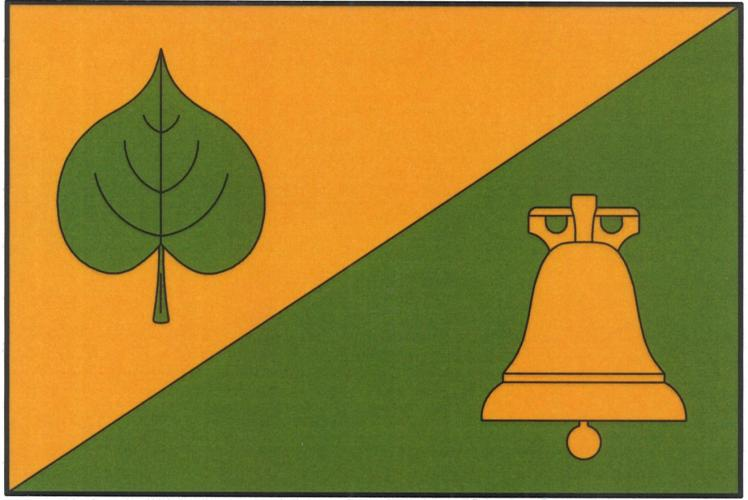
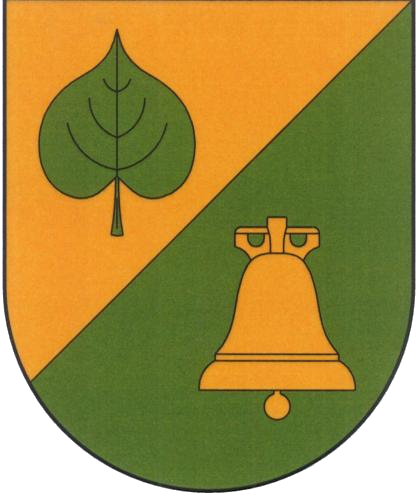
- Flag Coat of arms

- Location in the Czech Republic
- Coordinates: 50°9′53″N 15°0′5″E
- Country: Czech Republic
- Region: Central Bohemian
- District: Nymburk
- First mentioned: 1338

Area
  - Total: 1.75 km^{2} (0.68 sq mi)
- Elevation: 184 m (604 ft)

Population (2026-01-01)
  - Total: 452
  - Density: 258/km^{2} (669/sq mi)
- Time zone: UTC+1 (CET)
  - Summer (DST): UTC+2 (CEST)
- Postal code: 289 13
- Website: pisty-nb.cz

Písty is a municipality and village in Nymburk District in the Central Bohemian Region of the Czech Republic. It has about 500 inhabitants.

== Demographics ==
Historical population
| Year | Pop. | ±% |
|---|---|---|
| 1869 | 214 | — |
| 1880 | 231 | +7.9% |
| 1890 | 248 | +7.4% |
| 1900 | 250 | +0.8% |
| 1910 | 279 | +11.6% |
| 1921 | 315 | +12.9% |
| 1930 | 313 | −0.6% |
| 1950 | 402 | +28.4% |
| 1961 | 400 | −0.5% |
| 1970 | 337 | −15.7% |
| 1980 | 310 | −8.0% |
| 1991 | 307 | −1.0% |
| 2001 | 344 | +12.1% |
| 2011 | 405 | +17.7% |
| 2021 | 429 | +5.9% |
Source: Censuses
