= Soběhrdy =

- Municipality
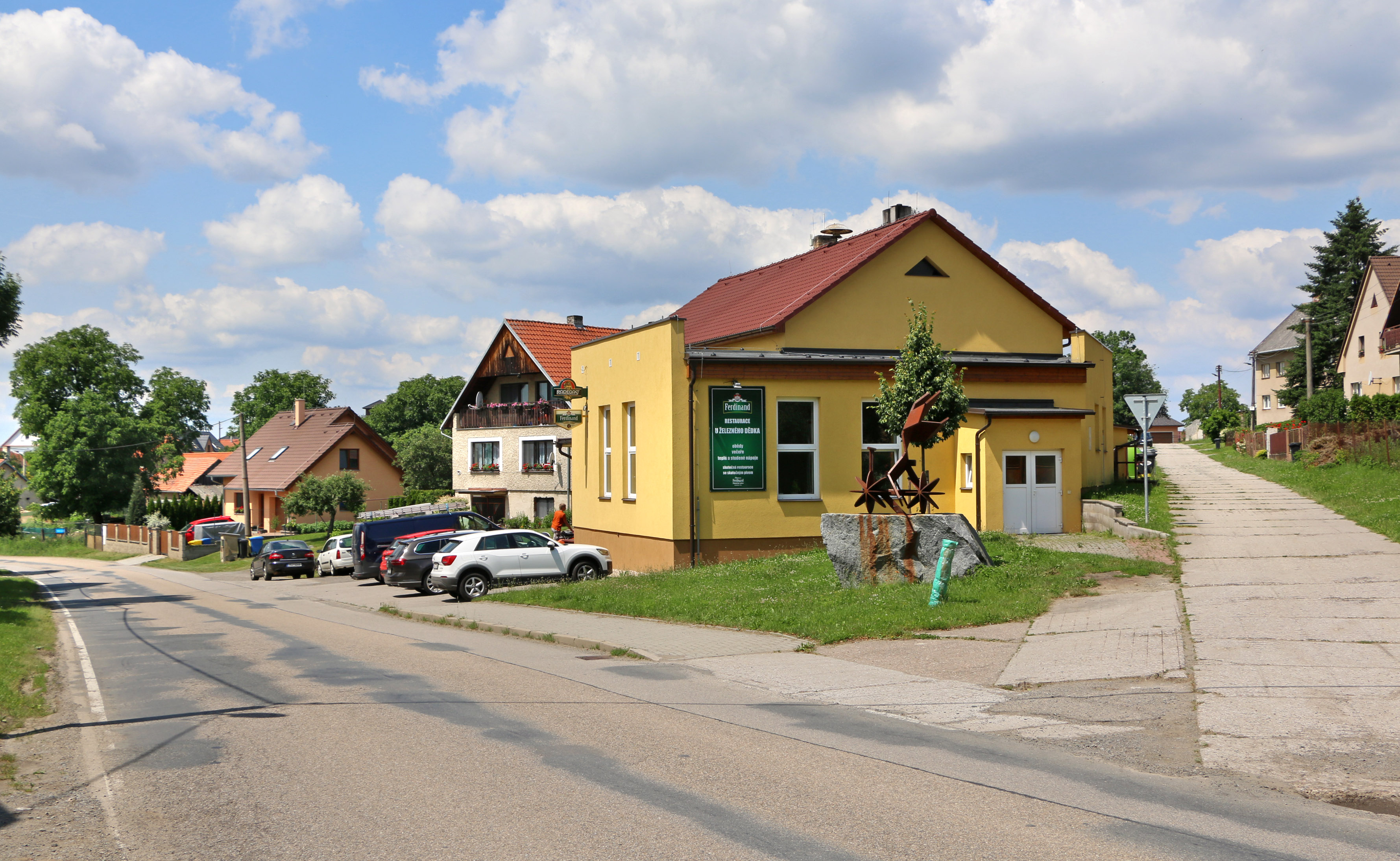
- Restaurant and municipal office

- Flag Coat of arms

- Location in the Czech Republic
- Coordinates: 49°49′16″N 14°44′3″E
- Country: Czech Republic
- Region: Central Bohemian
- District: Benešov
- First mentioned: 1360

Area
  - Total: 10.12 km^{2} (3.91 sq mi)
- Elevation: 409 m (1,342 ft)

Population (2026-01-01)
  - Total: 469
  - Density: 46.3/km^{2} (120/sq mi)
- Time zone: UTC+1 (CET)
  - Summer (DST): UTC+2 (CEST)
- Postal code: 256 01
- Website: www.sobehrdy.cz

Soběhrdy is a municipality and village in Benešov District in the Central Bohemian Region of the Czech Republic. It has about 500 inhabitants.

== Administrative division ==
Soběhrdy consists of five municipal parts (in brackets population according to the 2021 census):

- Soběhrdy (309)
- Mezihoří (89)
- Phov (22)
- Žíňánky (40)
- Žíňany (19)

== History ==
The first written mention of Soběhrdy is from 1360.

== Demographics ==
Historical population
Year	Pop.	±%
1869	742	—
1880	755	+1.8%
1890	771	+2.1%
1900	662	−14.1%
1910	625	−5.6%
1921	613	−1.9%
1930	623	+1.6%
1950	500	−19.7%
1961	442	−11.6%
1970	396	−10.4%
1980	320	−19.2%
1991	270	−15.6%
2001	286	+5.9%
2011	342	+19.6%
2021	479	+40.1%
Source: Censuses
