= Doubravčice =

- Municipality
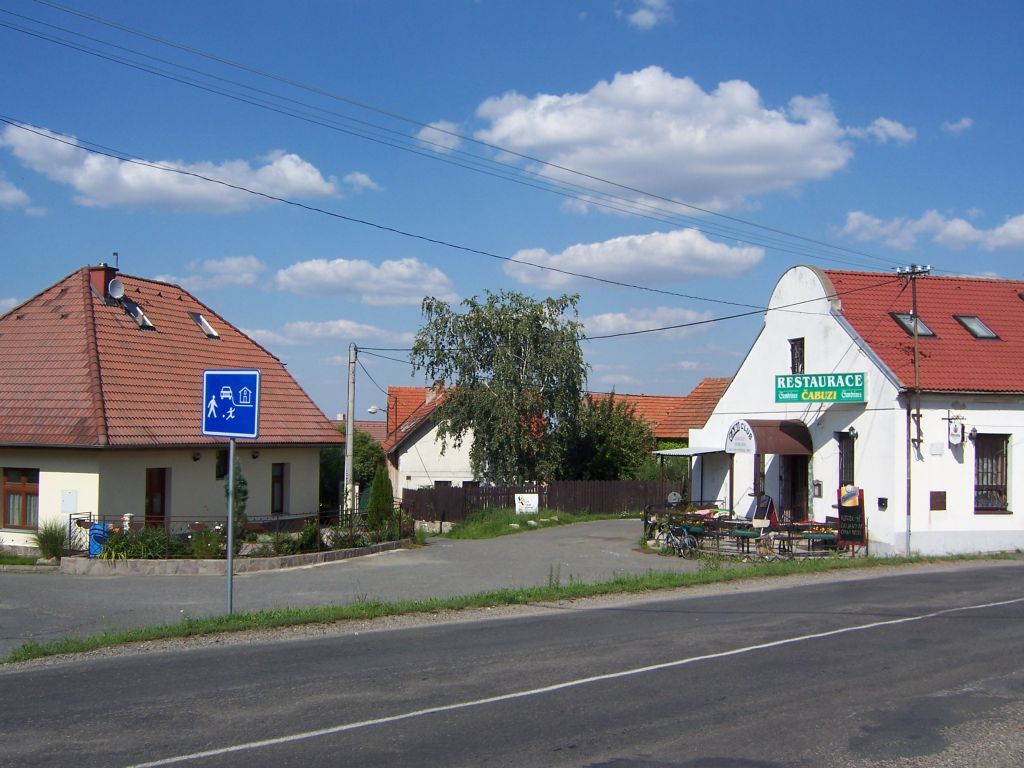
- Centre with a restaurant

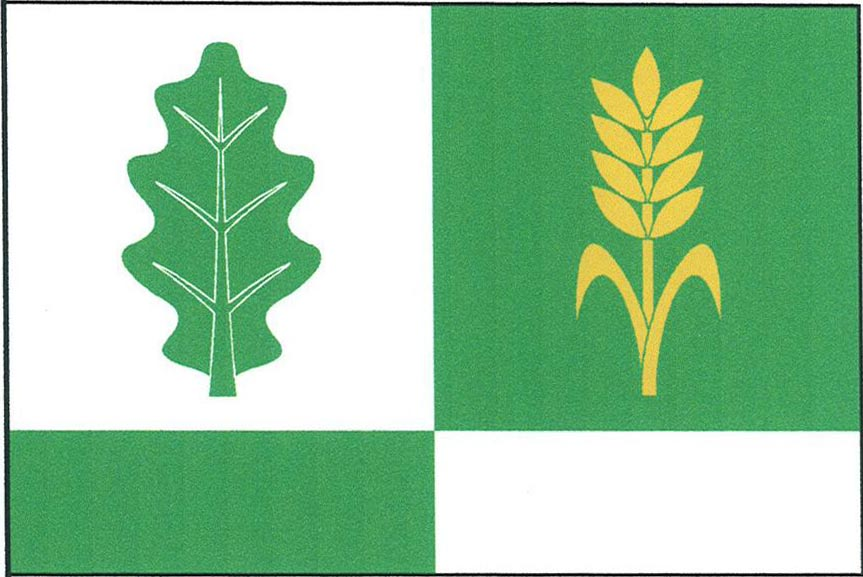
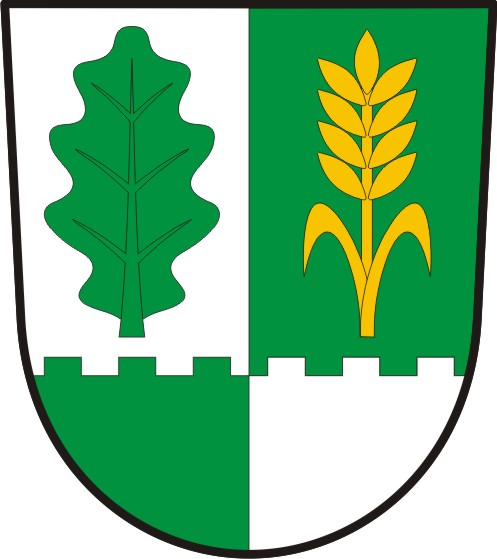
- Flag Coat of arms

- Location in the Czech Republic
- Coordinates: 50°1′20″N 14°47′35″E
- Country: Czech Republic
- Region: Central Bohemian
- District: Kolín
- First mentioned: 1331

Area
  - Total: 9.18 km^{2} (3.54 sq mi)
- Elevation: 350 m (1,150 ft)

Population (2026-01-01)
  - Total: 1,415
  - Density: 154/km^{2} (399/sq mi)
- Time zone: UTC+1 (CET)
  - Summer (DST): UTC+2 (CEST)
- Postal code: 282 01
- Website: www.doubravcice.cz

Doubravčice is a municipality and village in Kolín District in the Central Bohemian Region of the Czech Republic. It has about 1,400 inhabitants.

== Etymology ==
The name is derived from the personal name Doubravka, meaning "the village of Doubravka's people".

== Geography ==
Doubravčice is located about 29 kilometres (18 mi) west of Kolín and 21 km (13 mi) east of Prague. It lies in the Benešov Uplands. The highest point is at 397 m (1,302 ft) above sea level. The Šembera Stream flows through the municipality.

== History ==
The first written mention of Doubravčice is from 1331.

== Demographics ==
Historical population

Year	Pop.	±%
1869	343	—
1880	401	+16.9%
1890	366	−8.7%
1900	362	−1.1%
1910	395	+9.1%

Year	Pop.	±%
1921	319	−19.2%
1930	306	−4.1%
1950	229	−25.2%
1961	232	+1.3%
1970	208	−10.3%

Year	Pop.	±%
1980	203	−2.4%
1991	194	−4.4%
2001	205	+5.7%
2011	523	+155.1%
2021	1,211	+131.5%

Source: Censuses

== Transport ==
There are no railways or major roads passing through the municipality.

== Sights ==
The only protected cultural monuments in the municipality are two archaeological sites, one on the site of the extinct medieval village of Dolánky and one on the site of a Slavic gord from the early Middle Ages.
