= Braškov =

- Municipality
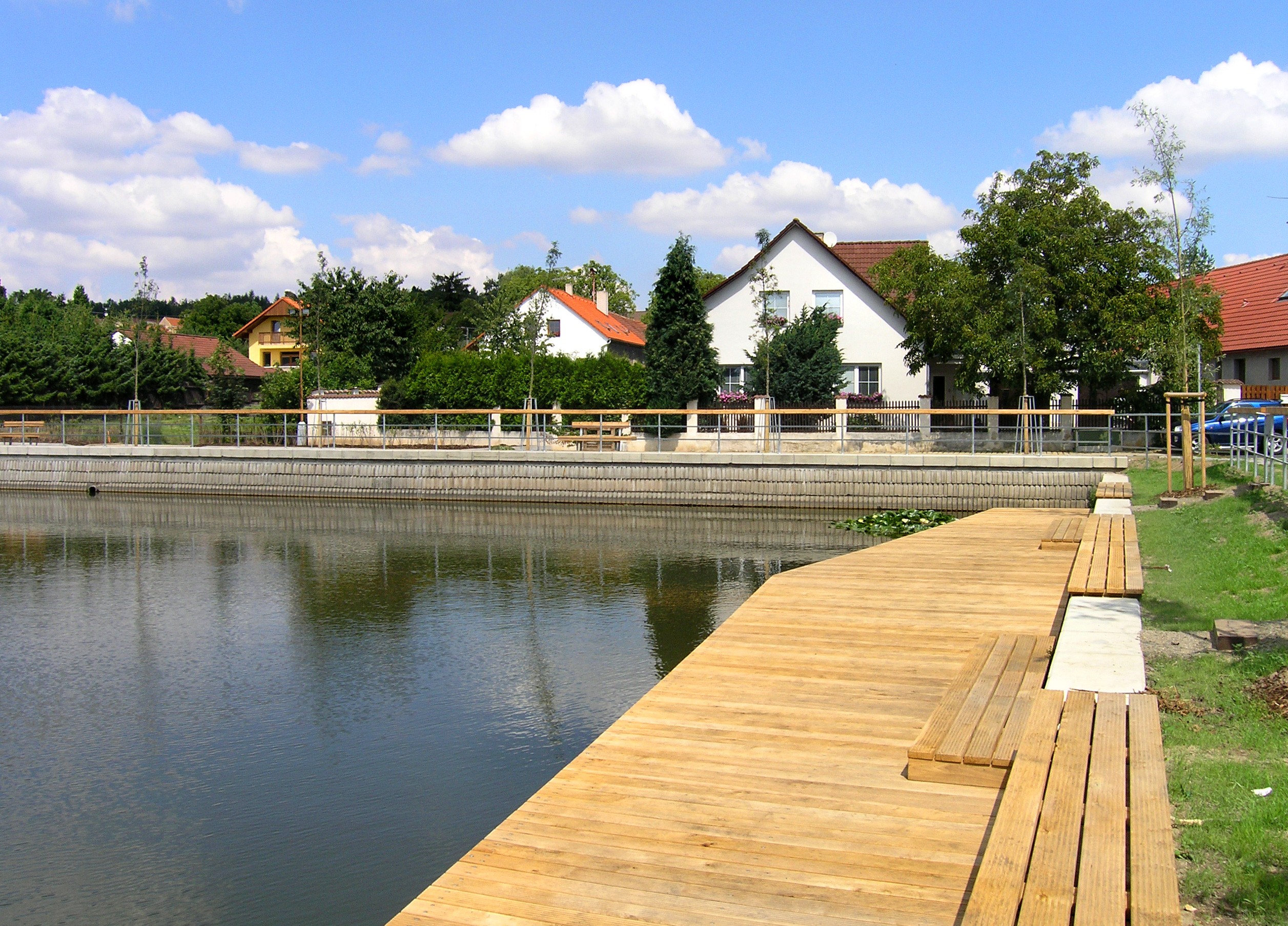
- Common pond

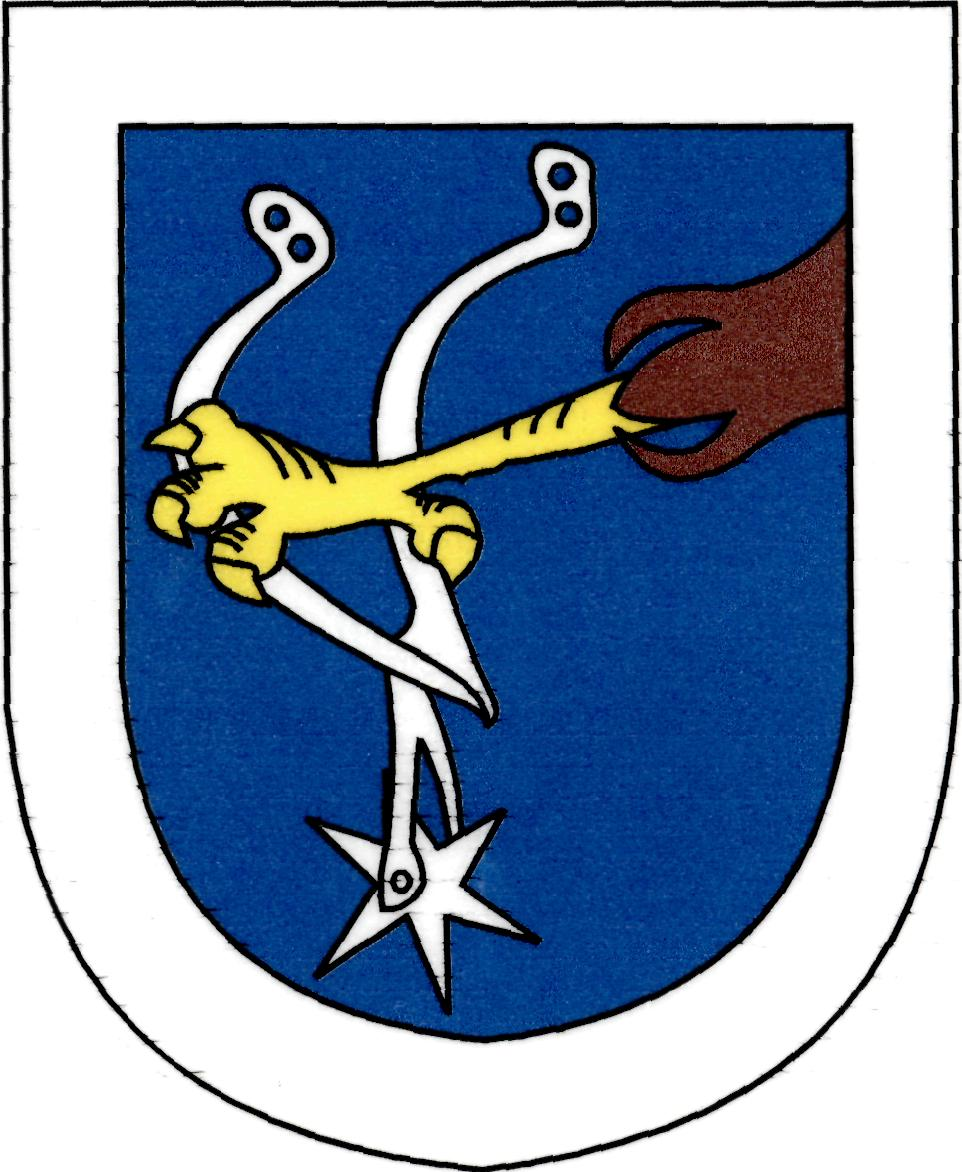
- Flag Coat of arms

- Location in the Czech Republic
- Coordinates: 50°6′8″N 14°6′3″E
- Country: Czech Republic
- Region: Central Bohemian
- District: Kladno
- First mentioned: 1249

Area
  - Total: 4.77 km^{2} (1.84 sq mi)
- Elevation: 416 m (1,365 ft)

Population (2026-01-01)
  - Total: 1,125
  - Density: 236/km^{2} (611/sq mi)
- Time zone: UTC+1 (CET)
  - Summer (DST): UTC+2 (CEST)
- Postal code: 273 51
- Website: www.braskov.cz

Braškov is a municipality and village in Kladno District in the Central Bohemian Region of the Czech Republic. It has about 1,100 inhabitants.

== Etymology ==
The name is derived from the personal name Bražek of Brašek, meaning "Bražek's/Brašek's (court)".

== Geography ==
Braškov is located about 4 kilometres (2 mi) south of Kladno and 17 km (11 mi) west of Prague. It lies in the Křivoklát Highlands. The highest point is the flat hill Horka at 447 m (1,467 ft) above sea level.

== History ==
The first written mention of Braškov is from 1249.

== Demographics ==
Historical population

Year	Pop.	±%
1869	472	—
1880	525	+11.2%
1890	577	+9.9%
1900	631	+9.4%
1910	760	+20.4%

Year	Pop.	±%
1921	723	−4.9%
1930	901	+24.6%
1950	878	−2.6%
1961	926	+5.5%
1970	915	−1.2%

Year	Pop.	±%
1980	813	−11.1%
1991	795	−2.2%
2001	866	+8.9%
2011	1,016	+17.3%
2021	1,118	+10.0%

Source: Censuses

== Transport ==
The D6 motorway from Prague to Karlovy Vary runs through the northern part of the municipality.

== Sights ==
Among the protected cultural monuments are a column shrine from 1897 and a former inn, which is an early Baroque building from the 17th century.
