= Nesvačily =

- Municipality
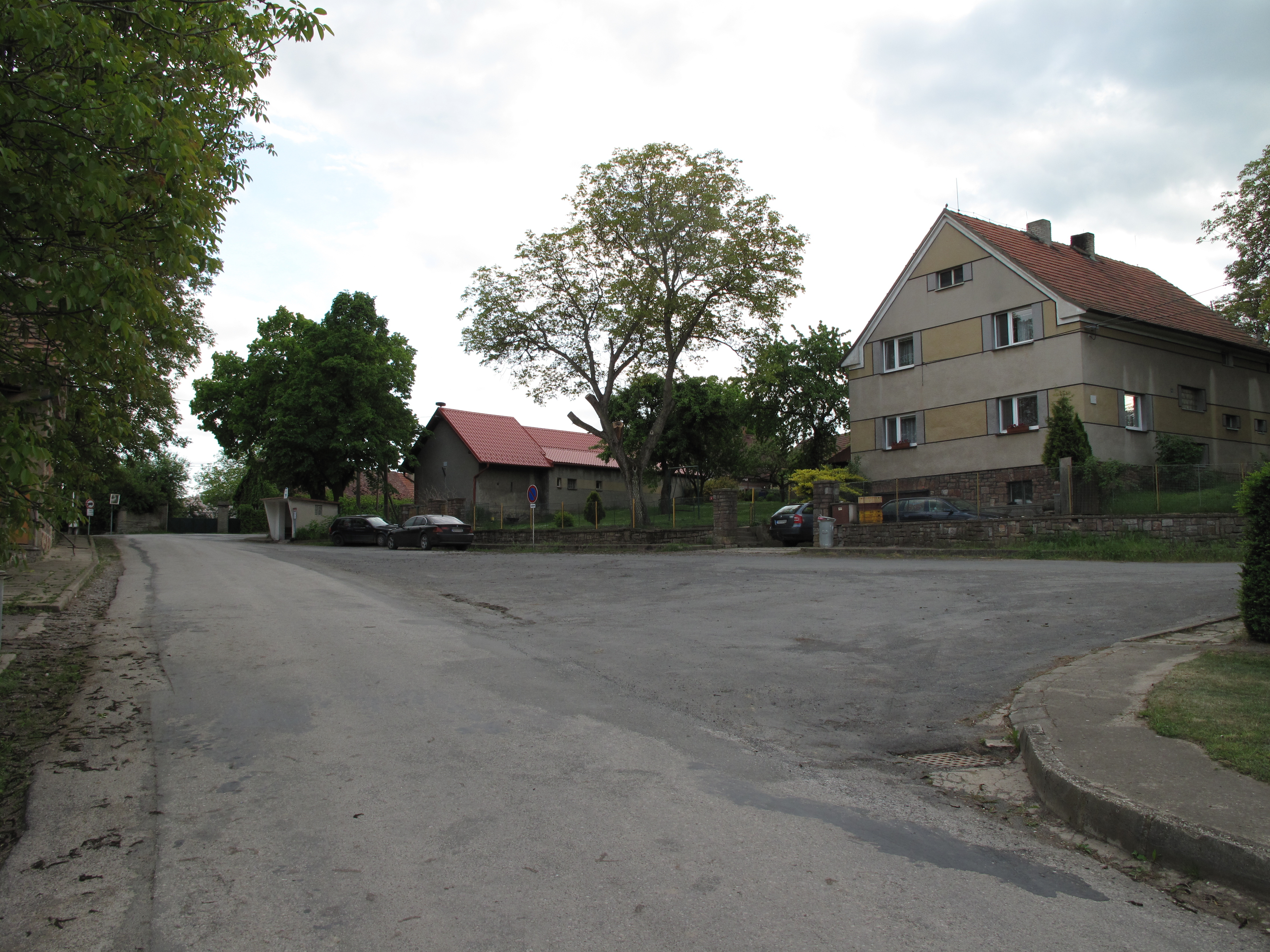
- Crossroads in Nesvačily

- Location in the Czech Republic
- Coordinates: 49°52′53″N 14°7′28″E
- Country: Czech Republic
- Region: Central Bohemian
- District: Beroun
- First mentioned: 1391

Area
  - Total: 2.74 km^{2} (1.06 sq mi)
- Elevation: 325 m (1,066 ft)

Population (2026-01-01)
  - Total: 181
  - Density: 66.1/km^{2} (171/sq mi)
- Time zone: UTC+1 (CET)
  - Summer (DST): UTC+2 (CEST)
- Postal code: 267 27
- Website: nesvacily.cz

Nesvačily is a municipality and village in Beroun District in the Central Bohemian Region of the Czech Republic. It has about 200 inhabitants.

== Demographics ==
Historical population
| Year | Pop. | ±% |
|---|---|---|
| 1869 | 245 | — |
| 1880 | 268 | +9.4% |
| 1890 | 249 | −7.1% |
| 1900 | 263 | +5.6% |
| 1910 | 218 | −17.1% |
| 1921 | 211 | −3.2% |
| 1930 | 225 | +6.6% |
| 1950 | 177 | −21.3% |
| 1961 | 167 | −5.6% |
| 1970 | 146 | −12.6% |
| 1980 | 128 | −12.3% |
| 1991 | 112 | −12.5% |
| 2001 | 107 | −4.5% |
| 2011 | 146 | +36.4% |
| 2021 | 192 | +31.5% |
Source: Censuses
