= Malíkovice =

- Municipality
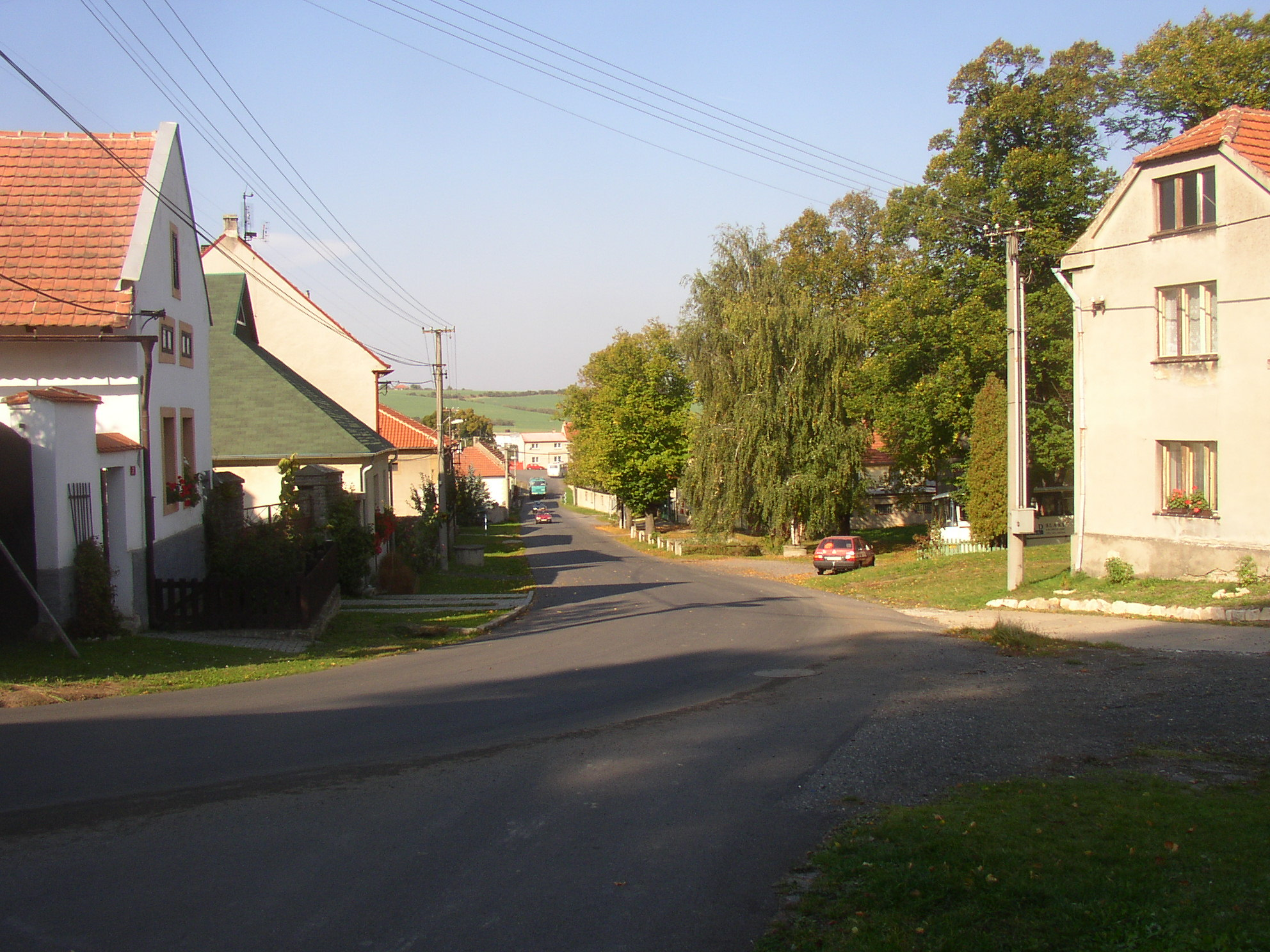
- Centre of Malíkovice

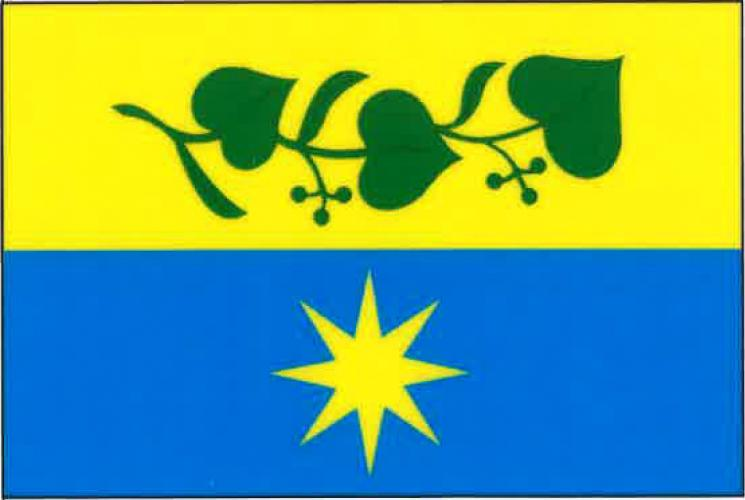
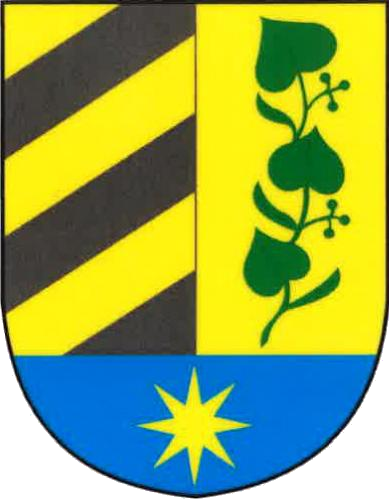
- Flag Coat of arms

- Location in the Czech Republic
- Coordinates: 50°12′41″N 13°58′57″E
- Country: Czech Republic
- Region: Central Bohemian
- District: Kladno
- First mentioned: 1349

Area
  - Total: 6.25 km^{2} (2.41 sq mi)
- Elevation: 345 m (1,132 ft)

Population (2026-01-01)
  - Total: 388
  - Density: 62.1/km^{2} (161/sq mi)
- Time zone: UTC+1 (CET)
  - Summer (DST): UTC+2 (CEST)
- Postal code: 273 77
- Website: www.malikovice.cz

Malíkovice is a municipality and village in Kladno District in the Central Bohemian Region of the Czech Republic. It has about 400 inhabitants.

== Administrative division ==
Malíkovice consists of three municipal parts (in brackets population according to the 2021 census):

- Malíkovice (220)
- Čanovice (24)
- Hvězda (125)

== Demographics ==
Historical population
Year	Pop.	±%
1869	600	—
1880	639	+6.5%
1890	594	−7.0%
1900	615	+3.5%
1910	690	+12.2%
1921	734	+6.4%
1930	712	−3.0%
1950	550	−22.8%
1961	516	−6.2%
1970	493	−4.5%
1980	421	−14.6%
1991	339	−19.5%
2001	332	−2.1%
2011	367	+10.5%
2021	369	+0.5%
Source: Censuses
