= Mečeříž =

- Municipality
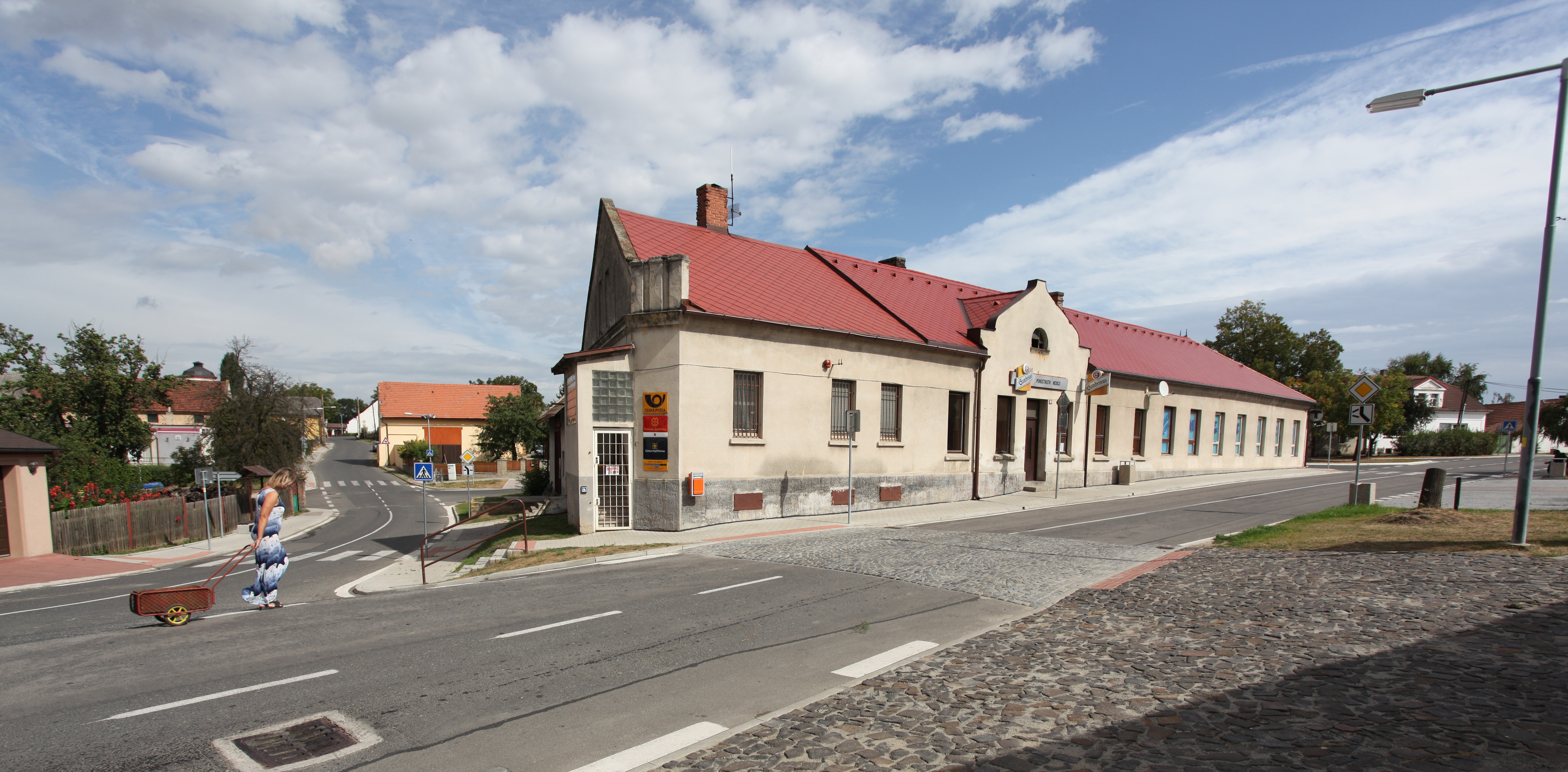
- Post office and inn in the centre of Mečeříž

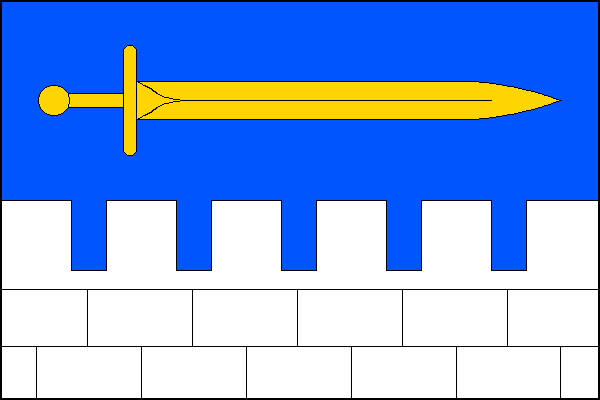
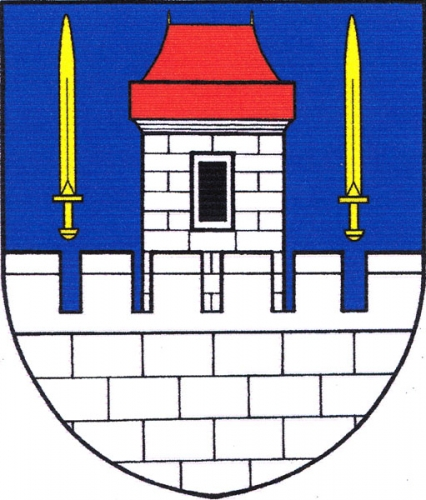
- Flag Coat of arms

- Location in the Czech Republic
- Coordinates: 50°17′26″N 14°44′13″E
- Country: Czech Republic
- Region: Central Bohemian
- District: Mladá Boleslav
- First mentioned: 1046

Area
  - Total: 7.06 km^{2} (2.73 sq mi)
- Elevation: 290 m (950 ft)

Population (2026-01-01)
  - Total: 559
  - Density: 79.2/km^{2} (205/sq mi)
- Time zone: UTC+1 (CET)
  - Summer (DST): UTC+2 (CEST)
- Postal code: 294 77
- Website: www.meceriz.cz

Mečeříž is a municipality and village in Mladá Boleslav District in the Central Bohemian Region of the Czech Republic. It has about 600 inhabitants.

== Demographics ==
Historical population
Year	Pop.	±%
1869	527	—
1880	662	+25.6%
1890	604	−8.8%
1900	649	+7.5%
1910	709	+9.2%
1921	684	−3.5%
1930	670	−2.0%
1950	521	−22.2%
1961	521	+0.0%
1970	471	−9.6%
1980	416	−11.7%
1991	395	−5.0%
2001	380	−3.8%
2011	465	+22.4%
2021	540	+16.1%
Source: Censuses
