= Tehovec, Czech Republic =

Tehovec
- Municipality
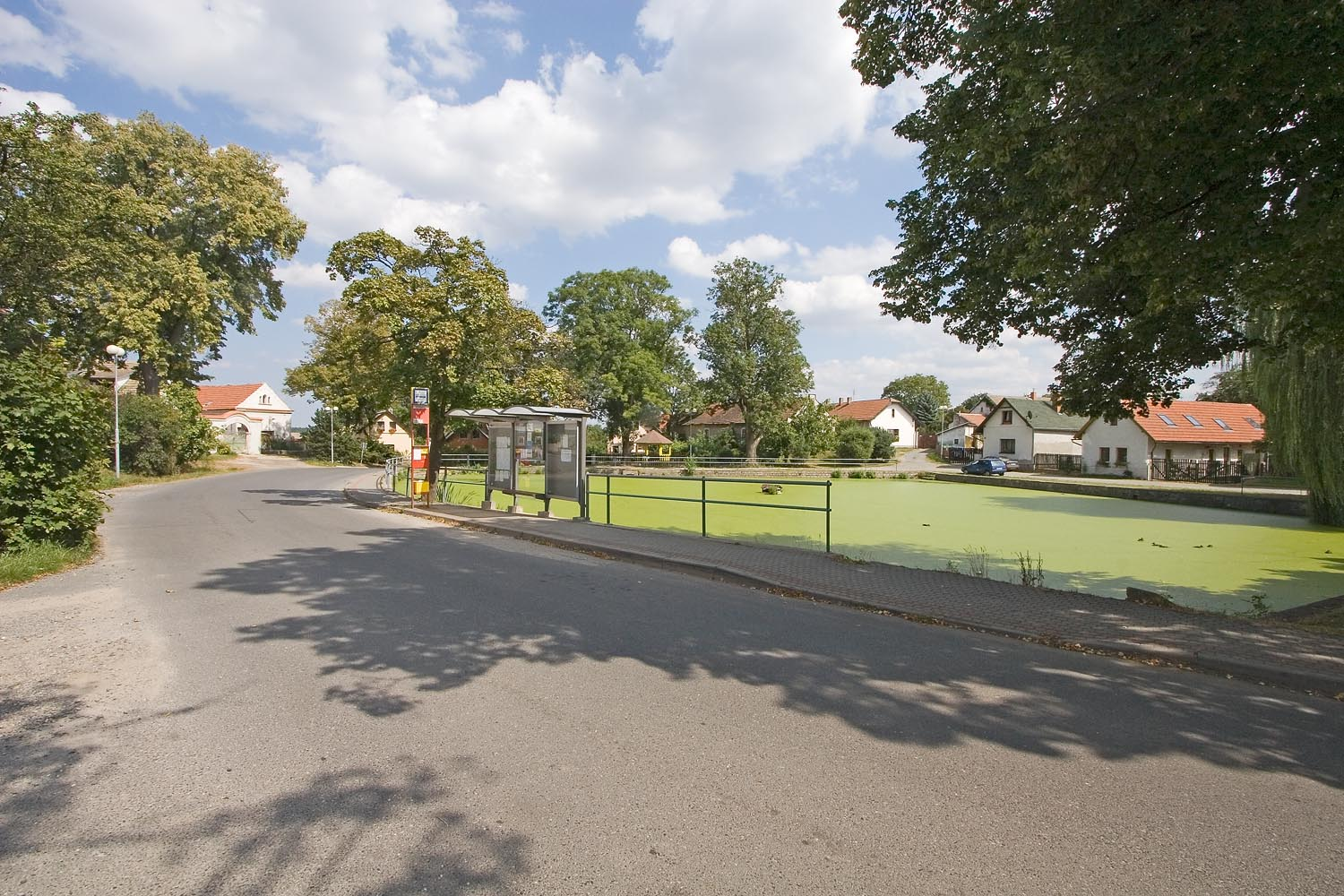
- Pond in the centre of Tehovec

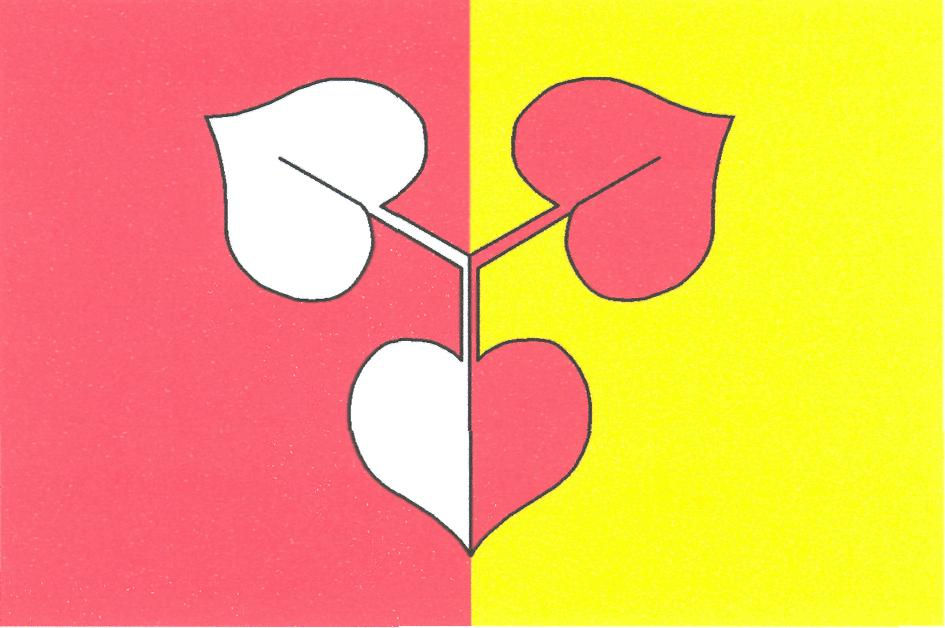
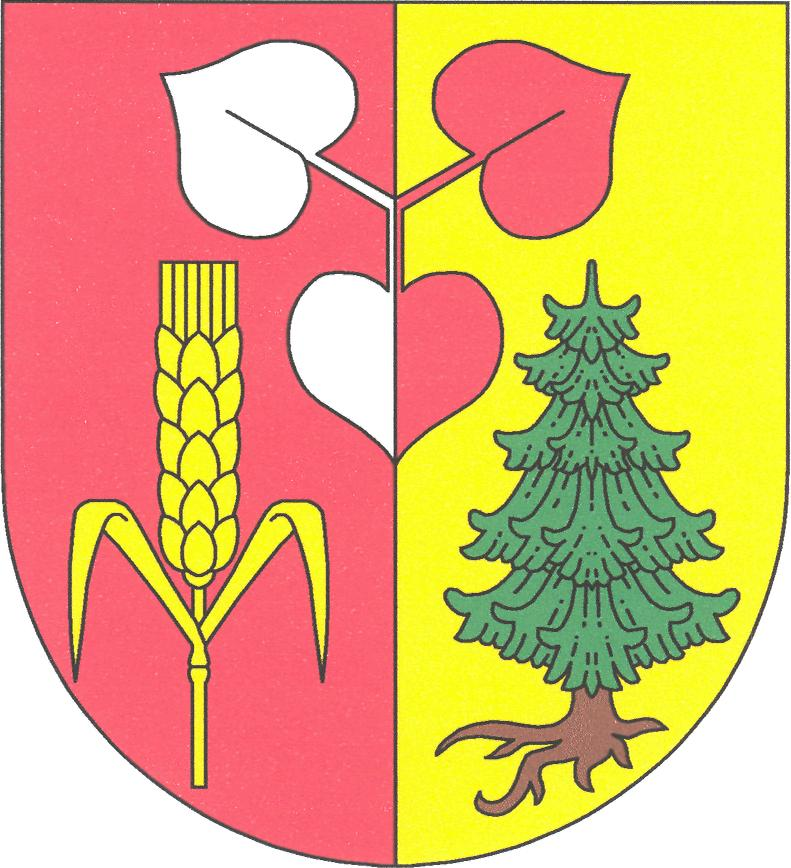
- Flag Coat of arms

- Location in the Czech Republic
- Coordinates: 49°58′54″N 14°43′49″E
- Country: Czech Republic
- Region: Central Bohemian
- District: Prague-East
- First mentioned: 1373

Area
  - Total: 2.78 km^{2} (1.07 sq mi)
- Elevation: 440 m (1,440 ft)

Population (2026-01-01)
  - Total: 700
  - Density: 250/km^{2} (650/sq mi)
- Time zone: UTC+1 (CET)
  - Summer (DST): UTC+2 (CEST)
- Postal code: 251 62
- Website: www.tehovec.cz

Tehovec is a municipality and village in Prague-East District in the Central Bohemian Region of the Czech Republic. It has about 700 inhabitants.

== Demographics ==
Historical population
Year	Pop.	±%
1869	268	—
1880	284	+6.0%
1890	276	−2.8%
1900	278	+0.7%
1910	318	+14.4%
1921	296	−6.9%
1930	299	+1.0%
1950	395	+32.1%
1961	272	−31.1%
1970	266	−2.2%
1980	255	−4.1%
1991	211	−17.3%
2001	216	+2.4%
2011	481	+122.7%
2021	676	+40.5%
Source: Censuses
