= Malotice =

- Municipality
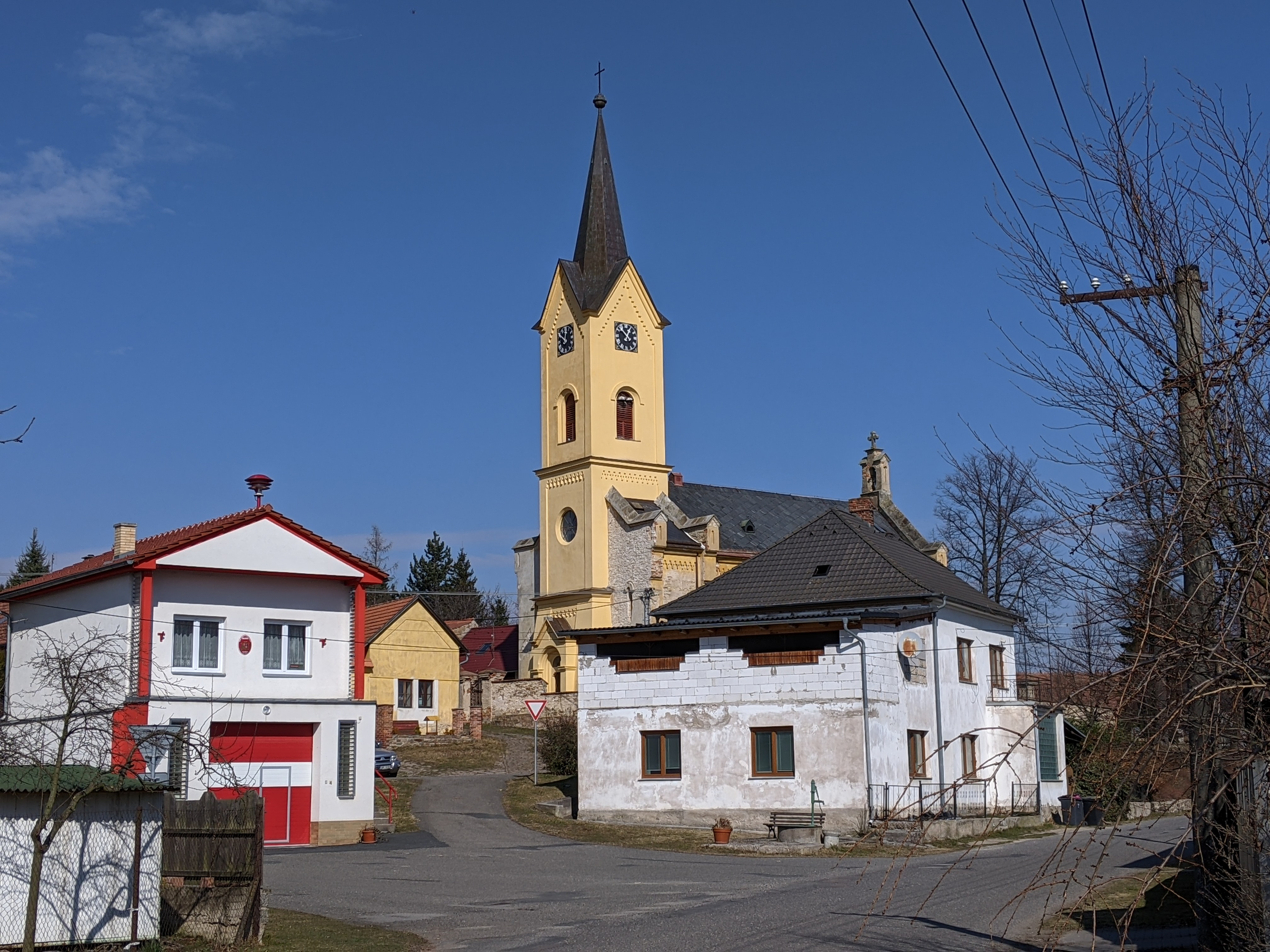
- View towards the Church of Saint Matthew

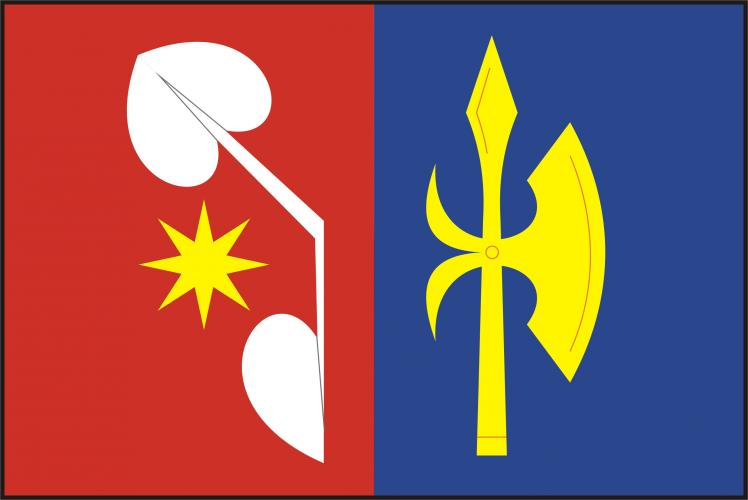
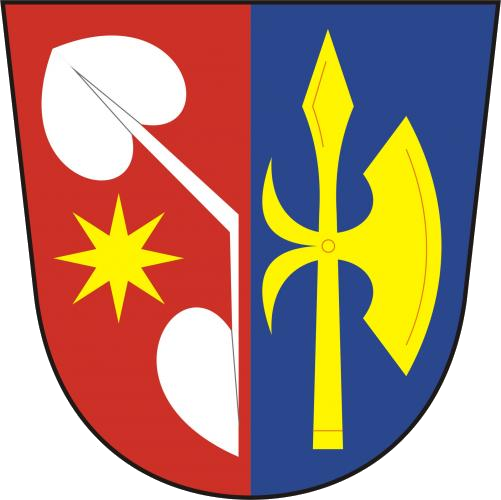
- Flag Coat of arms

- Location in the Czech Republic
- Coordinates: 49°57′55″N 14°58′40″E
- Country: Czech Republic
- Region: Central Bohemian
- District: Kolín
- First mentioned: 1295

Area
  - Total: 8.57 km^{2} (3.31 sq mi)
- Elevation: 315 m (1,033 ft)

Population (2026-01-01)
  - Total: 374
  - Density: 43.6/km^{2} (113/sq mi)
- Time zone: UTC+1 (CET)
  - Summer (DST): UTC+2 (CEST)
- Postal code: 281 63
- Website: www.malotice-obec.cz

Malotice is a municipality and village in Kolín District in the Central Bohemian Region of the Czech Republic. It has about 400 inhabitants.

== Administrative division ==
Malotice consists of two municipal parts (in brackets population according to the 2021 census):

- Malotice (250)
- Lhotky (128)

== Demographics ==
Historical population
Year	Pop.	±%
1869	573	—
1880	662	+15.5%
1890	686	+3.6%
1900	629	−8.3%
1910	622	−1.1%
1921	614	−1.3%
1930	563	−8.3%
1950	425	−24.5%
1961	410	−3.5%
1970	335	−18.3%
1980	311	−7.2%
1991	298	−4.2%
2001	268	−10.1%
2011	283	+5.6%
2021	378	+33.6%
Source: Censuses
