= Brázdim =

- Municipality
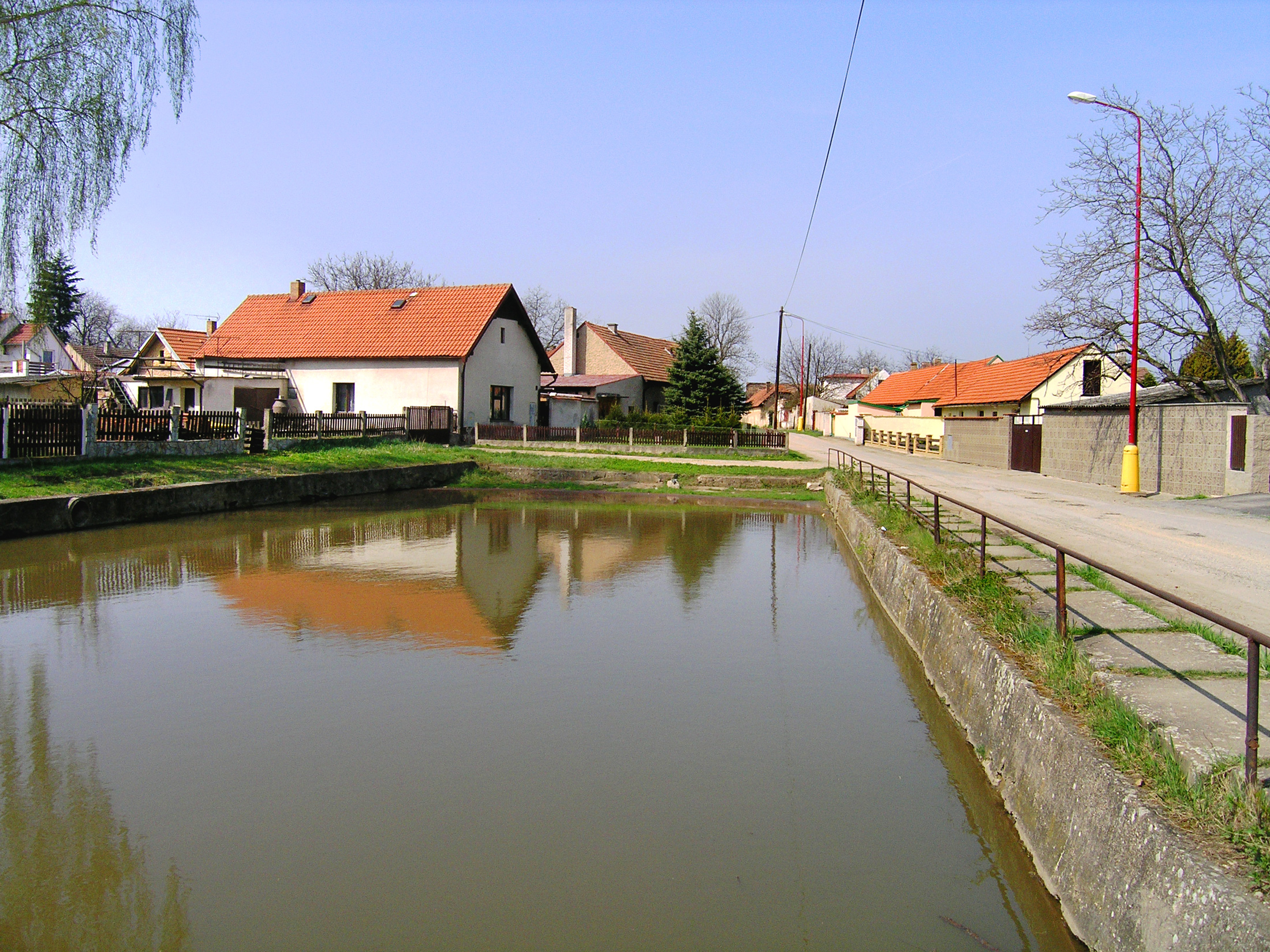
- Pond in Brázdim

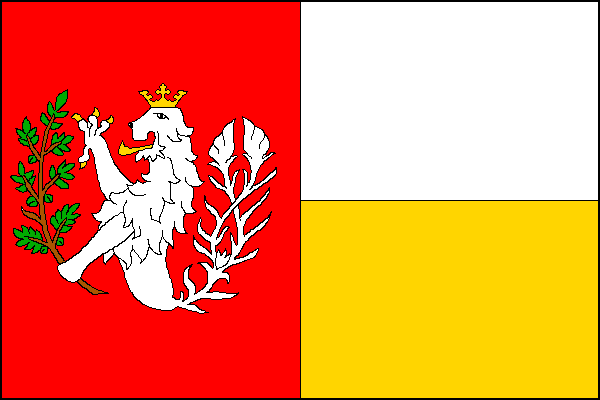
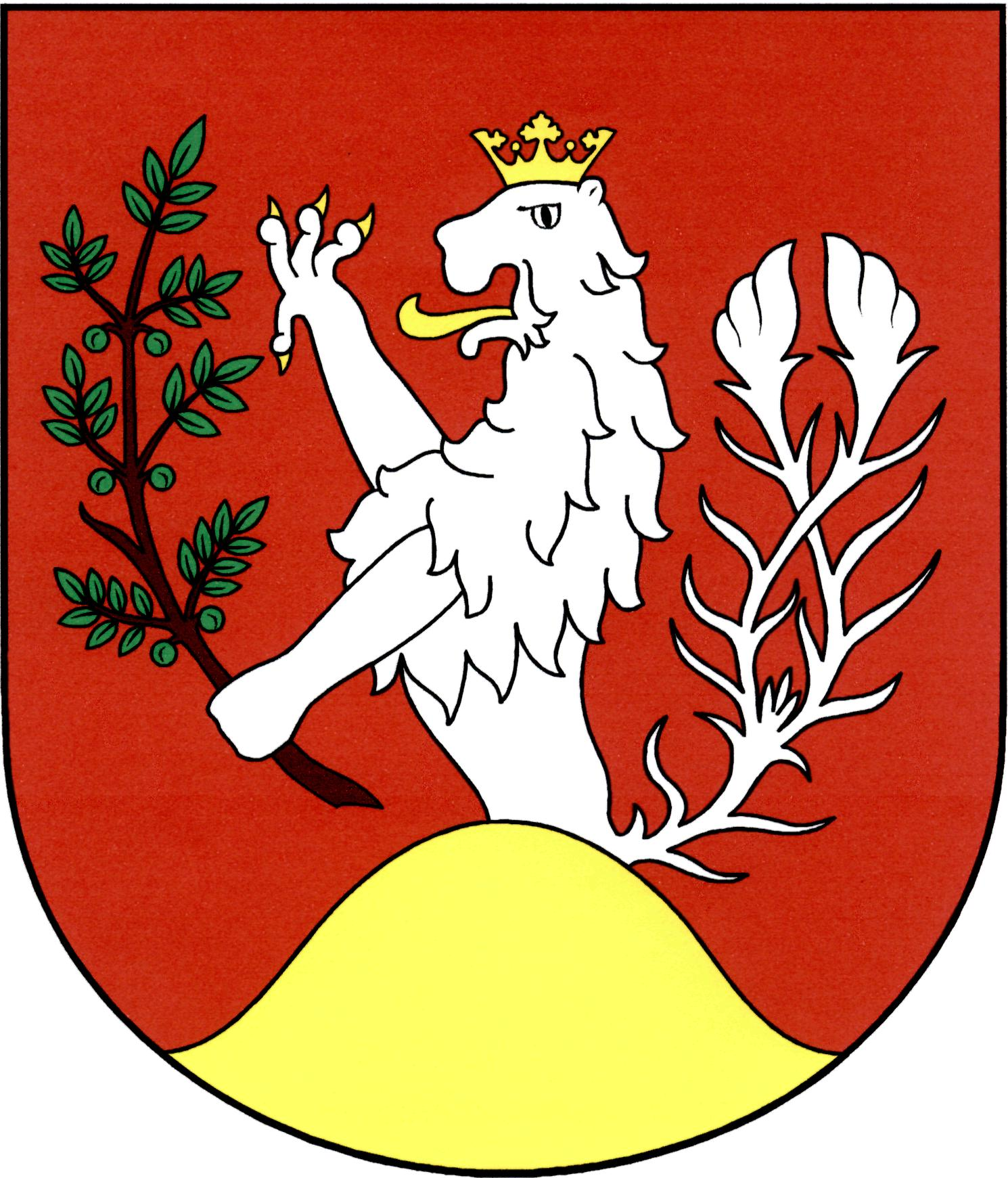
- Flag Coat of arms

- Location in the Czech Republic
- Coordinates: 50°11′6″N 14°35′23″E
- Country: Czech Republic
- Region: Central Bohemian
- District: Prague-East
- First mentioned: 1052

Area
  - Total: 5.48 km^{2} (2.12 sq mi)
- Elevation: 248 m (814 ft)

Population (2026-01-01)
  - Total: 720
  - Density: 130/km^{2} (340/sq mi)
- Time zone: UTC+1 (CET)
  - Summer (DST): UTC+2 (CEST)
- Postal code: 250 63
- Website: www.obecbrazdim.cz

Brázdim (until 1949 Veliký Brázdim) is a municipality in Prague-East District in the Central Bohemian Region of the Czech Republic. It has about 700 inhabitants.

== Administrative division ==
Brázdim consists of three municipal parts (in brackets population according to the 2021 census):

- Nový Brázdim (397)
- Starý Brázdim (242)
- Veliký Brázdim (102)

== Geography ==
Brázdim is located about 11 kilometres (7 mi) northeast of Prague. It lies in a flat agricultural landscape in the Central Elbe Table.

== History ==
The first written mention of Brázdim is from 1052. At that time, it was formed by several cottages and two fortresses called Velký Brázdim and Malý Brázdim. In 1777, the village of Nový Brázdim was founded and Malý Brázdim was renamed Starý Brázdim.

== Demographics ==
Historical population

Year	Pop.	±%
1869	530	—
1880	562	+6.0%
1890	597	+6.2%
1900	680	+13.9%
1910	708	+4.1%

Year	Pop.	±%
1921	600	−15.3%
1930	686	+14.3%
1950	567	−17.3%
1961	606	+6.9%
1970	567	−6.4%

Year	Pop.	±%
1980	543	−4.2%
1991	537	−1.1%
2001	602	+12.1%
2011	654	+8.6%
2021	741	+13.3%

Source: Censuses

== Transport ==
There are no railways or major roads passing through the municipality.

== Sights ==
There are no protected cultural monuments in the municipality.
