= Chářovice =

- Municipality
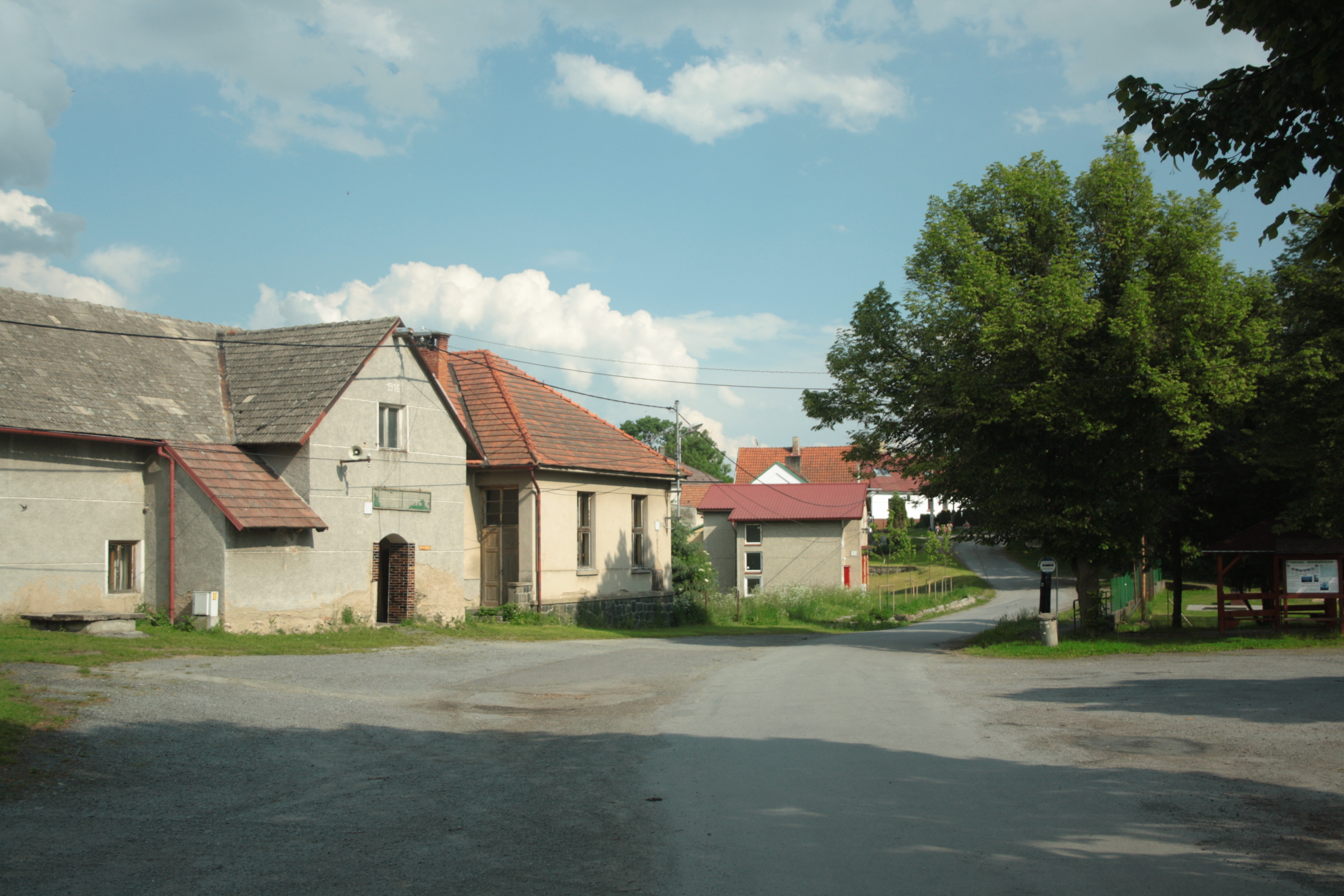
- Centre of Chářovice

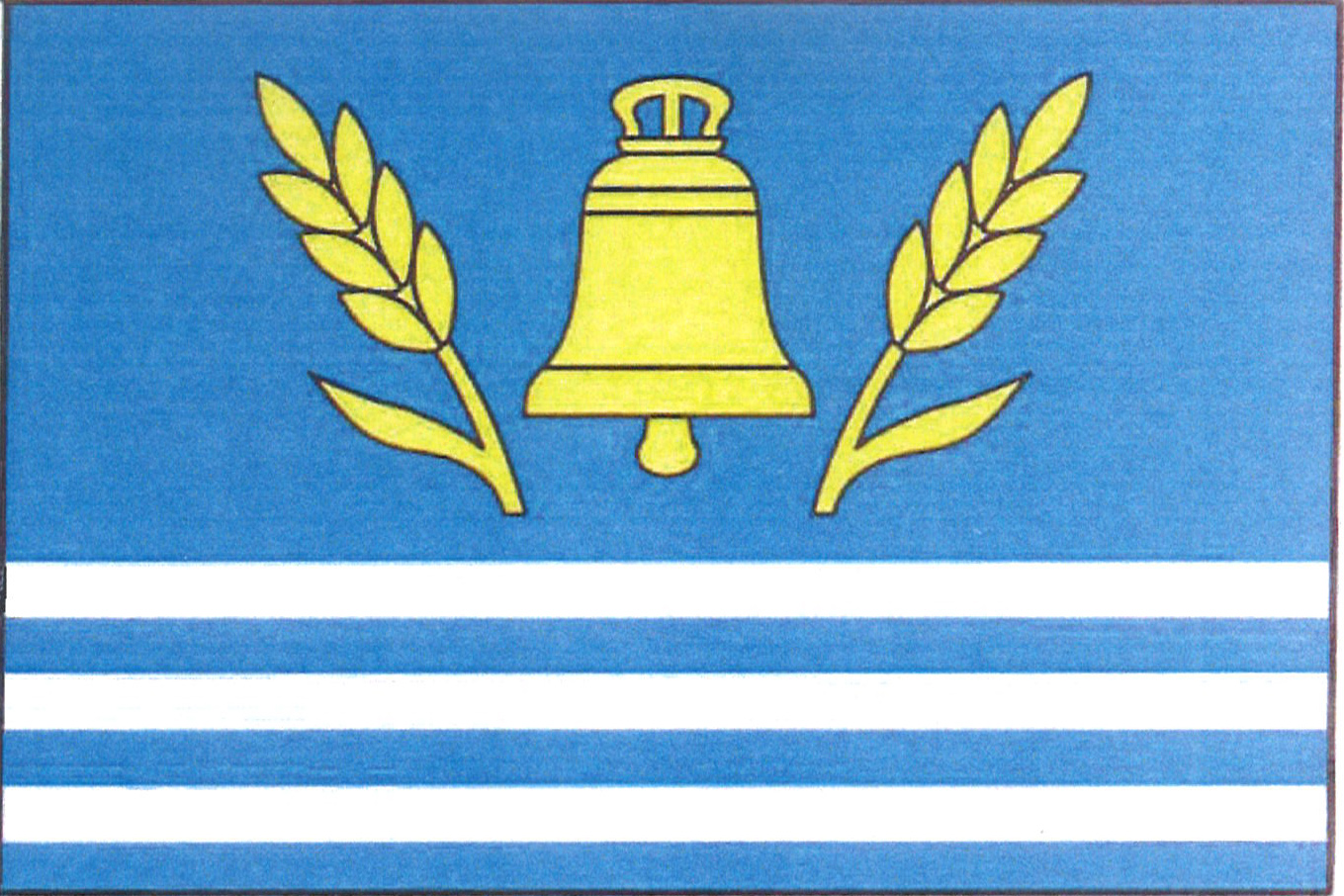
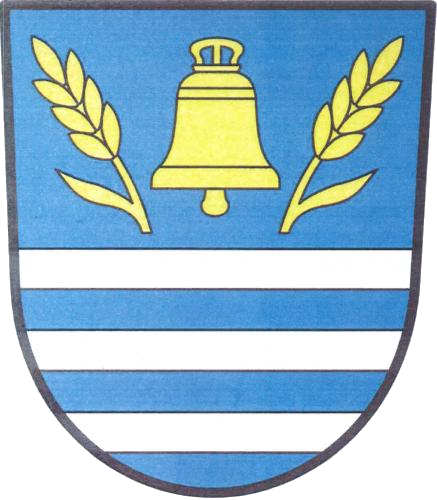
- Flag Coat of arms

- Location in the Czech Republic
- Coordinates: 49°49′13″N 14°34′40″E
- Country: Czech Republic
- Region: Central Bohemian
- District: Benešov
- First mentioned: 1394

Area
  - Total: 4.17 km^{2} (1.61 sq mi)
- Elevation: 305 m (1,001 ft)

Population (2026-01-01)
  - Total: 226
  - Density: 54.2/km^{2} (140/sq mi)
- Time zone: UTC+1 (CET)
  - Summer (DST): UTC+2 (CEST)
- Postal code: 257 41
- Website: www.charovice.cz

Chářovice is a municipality and village in Benešov District in the Central Bohemian Region of the Czech Republic. It has about 200 inhabitants.

== Etymology ==
The name is derived from the personal name Chář, meaning "the village of Chář's people".

== Geography ==
Chářovice is located about 9 kilometres (6 mi) northwest of Benešov and 25 km (16 mi) south of Prague. It lies in the Benešov Uplands. The highest point is a nameless hill at 356 m (1,168 ft) above sea level. The municipal territory is rich in fishponds.

== History ==
The first written mention of Chářovice is from 1394.

== Demographics ==
Historical population

Year	Pop.	±%
1869	223	—
1880	221	−0.9%
1890	240	+8.6%
1900	202	−15.8%
1910	209	+3.5%

Year	Pop.	±%
1921	193	−7.7%
1930	160	−17.1%
1950	158	−1.2%
1961	163	+3.2%
1970	185	+13.5%

Year	Pop.	±%
1980	206	+11.4%
1991	169	−18.0%
2001	158	−6.5%
2011	188	+19.0%
2021	220	+17.0%

Source: Censuses

== Transport ==
There are no railways or major roads passing through the municipality.

== Sights ==
There are no protected cultural monuments in the municipality.
