= Vrbčany =

- Municipality
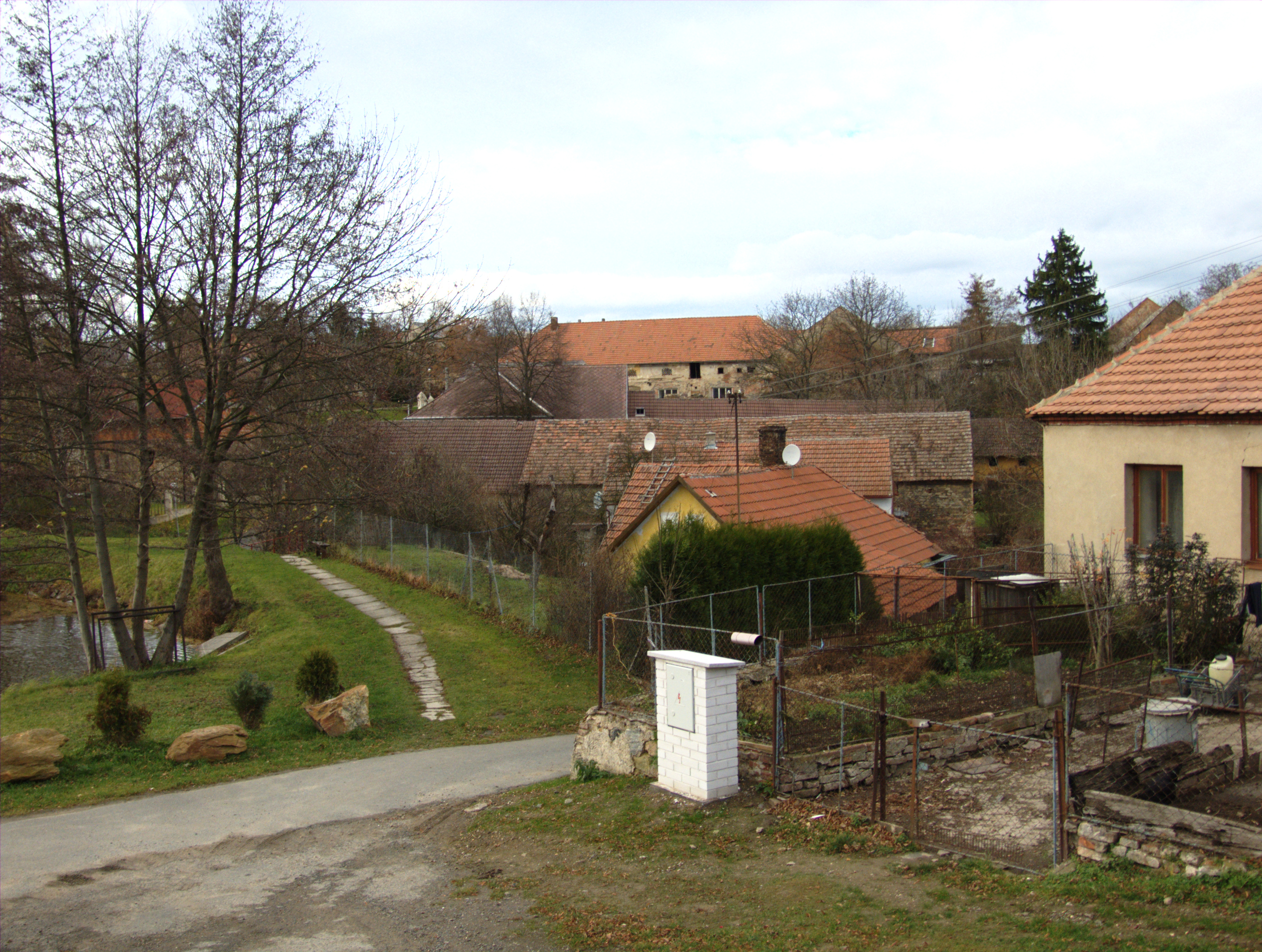
- Houses in Vrbčany

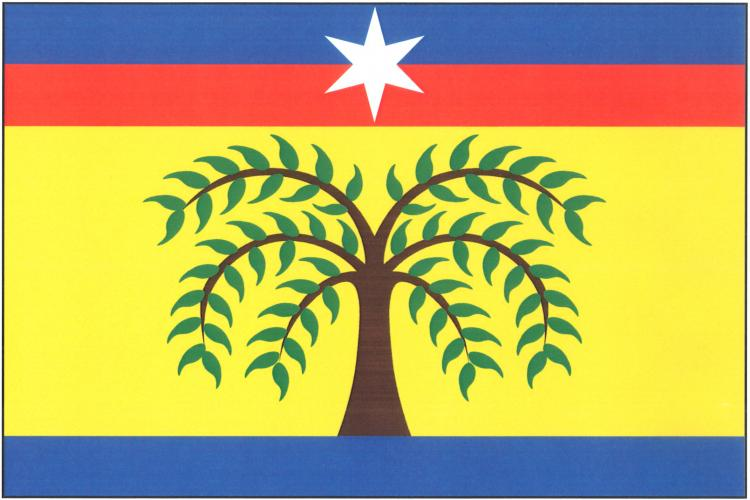
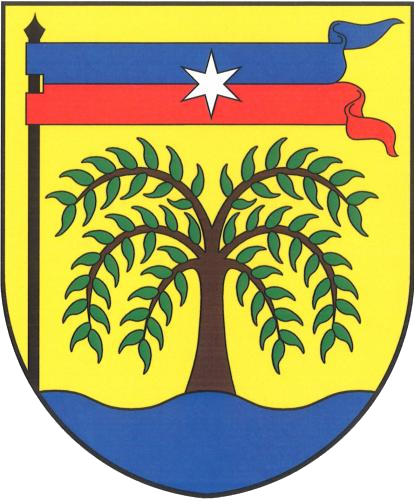
- Flag Coat of arms

- Location in the Czech Republic
- Coordinates: 50°3′0″N 14°59′34″E
- Country: Czech Republic
- Region: Central Bohemian
- District: Kolín
- First mentioned: 1070

Area
  - Total: 6.20 km^{2} (2.39 sq mi)
- Elevation: 221 m (725 ft)

Population (2026-01-01)
  - Total: 424
  - Density: 68.4/km^{2} (177/sq mi)
- Time zone: UTC+1 (CET)
  - Summer (DST): UTC+2 (CEST)
- Postal code: 280 02
- Website: www.obecvrbcany.cz

Vrbčany is a municipality and village in Kolín District in the Central Bohemian Region of the Czech Republic. It has about 400 inhabitants.

== Demographics ==
Historical population
Year	Pop.	±%
1869	530	—
1880	645	+21.7%
1890	711	+10.2%
1900	784	+10.3%
1910	810	+3.3%
1921	774	−4.4%
1930	822	+6.2%
1950	561	−31.8%
1961	550	−2.0%
1970	453	−17.6%
1980	379	−16.3%
1991	343	−9.5%
2001	311	−9.3%
2011	344	+10.6%
2021	413	+20.1%
Source: Censuses
