= Skuhrov (Beroun District) =

- Municipality
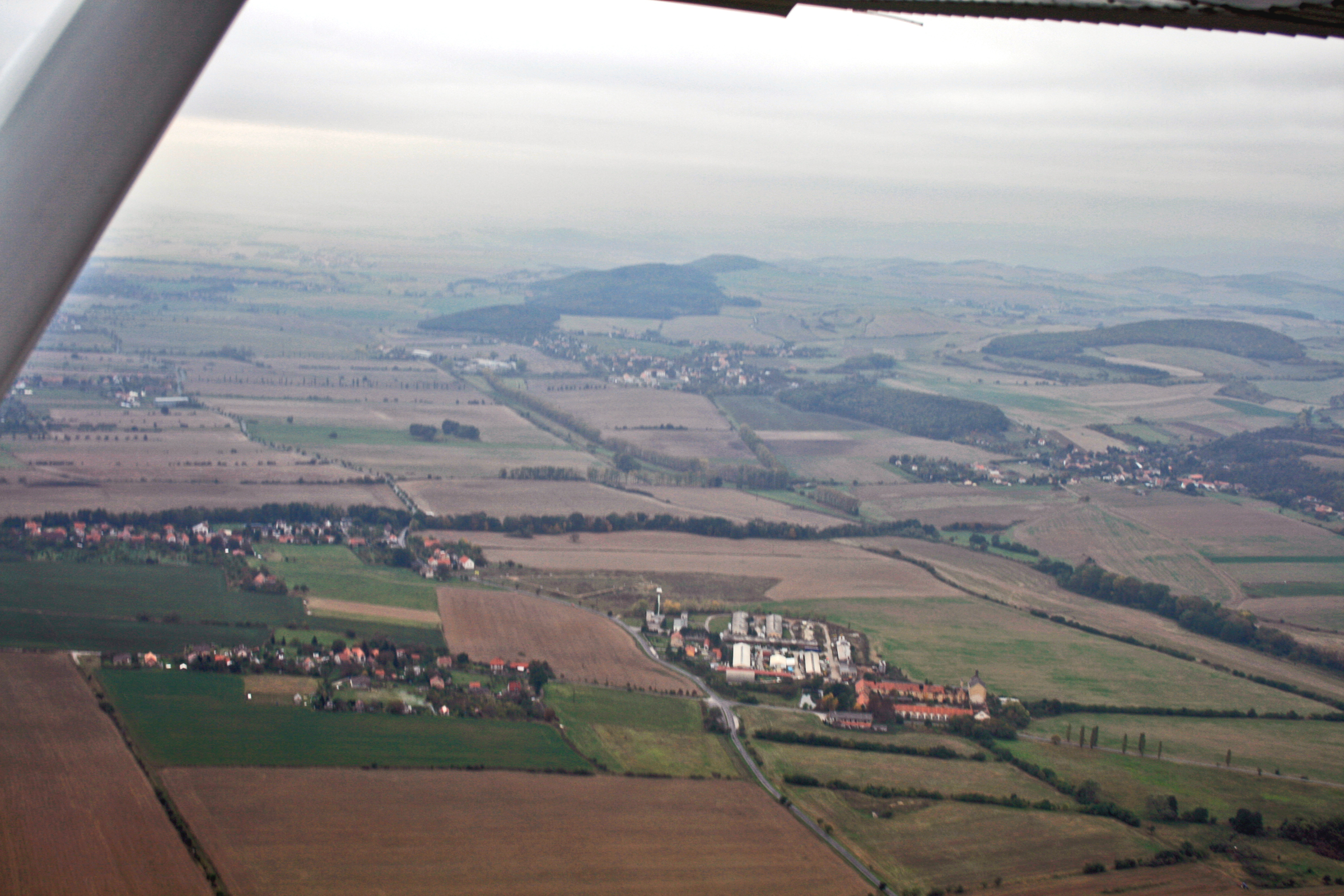
- Aerial view

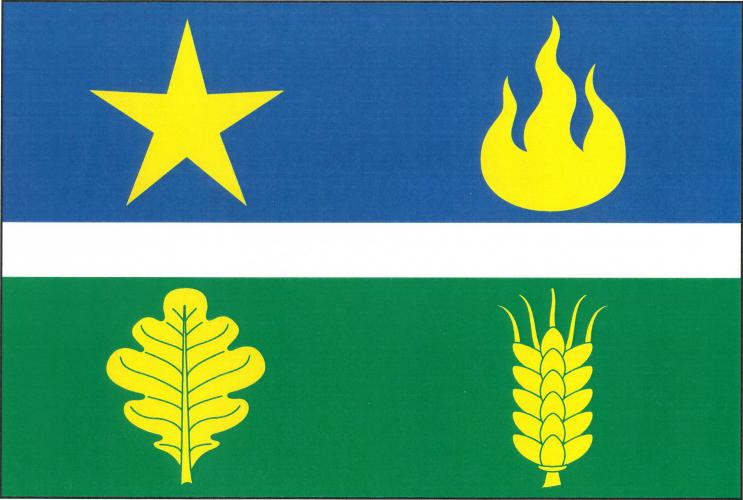
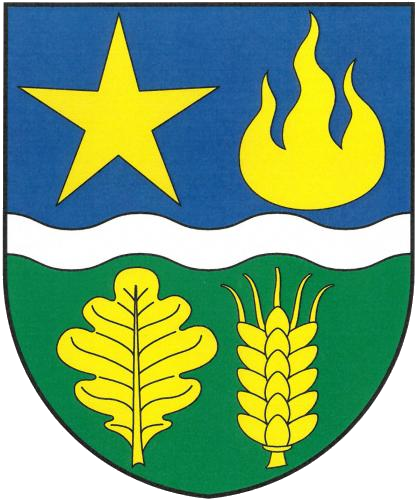
- Flag Coat of arms

- Location in the Czech Republic
- Coordinates: 49°52′24″N 14°8′48″E
- Country: Czech Republic
- Region: Central Bohemian
- District: Beroun
- First mentioned: 1316

Area
  - Total: 8.68 km^{2} (3.35 sq mi)
- Elevation: 342 m (1,122 ft)

Population (2026-01-01)
  - Total: 606
  - Density: 69.8/km^{2} (181/sq mi)
- Time zone: UTC+1 (CET)
  - Summer (DST): UTC+2 (CEST)
- Postal code: 267 27
- Website: www.obecskuhrov.cz

Skuhrov is a municipality and village in Beroun District in the Central Bohemian Region of the Czech Republic. It has about 600 inhabitants.

== Administrative division ==
Skuhrov consists of five municipal parts (in brackets population according to the 2021 census):

- Skuhrov (53)
- Drahlovice (140)
- Hatě (310)
- Hodyně (85)
- Leč (18)

== Demographics ==
Historical population
Year	Pop.	±%
1869	608	—
1880	606	−0.3%
1890	597	−1.5%
1900	646	+8.2%
1910	568	−12.1%
1921	492	−13.4%
1930	447	−9.1%
1950	362	−19.0%
1961	389	+7.5%
1970	386	−0.8%
1980	366	−5.2%
1991	362	−1.1%
2001	341	−5.8%
2011	449	+31.7%
2021	606	+35.0%
Source: Censuses
