= Slatina (Kladno District) =

- Municipality
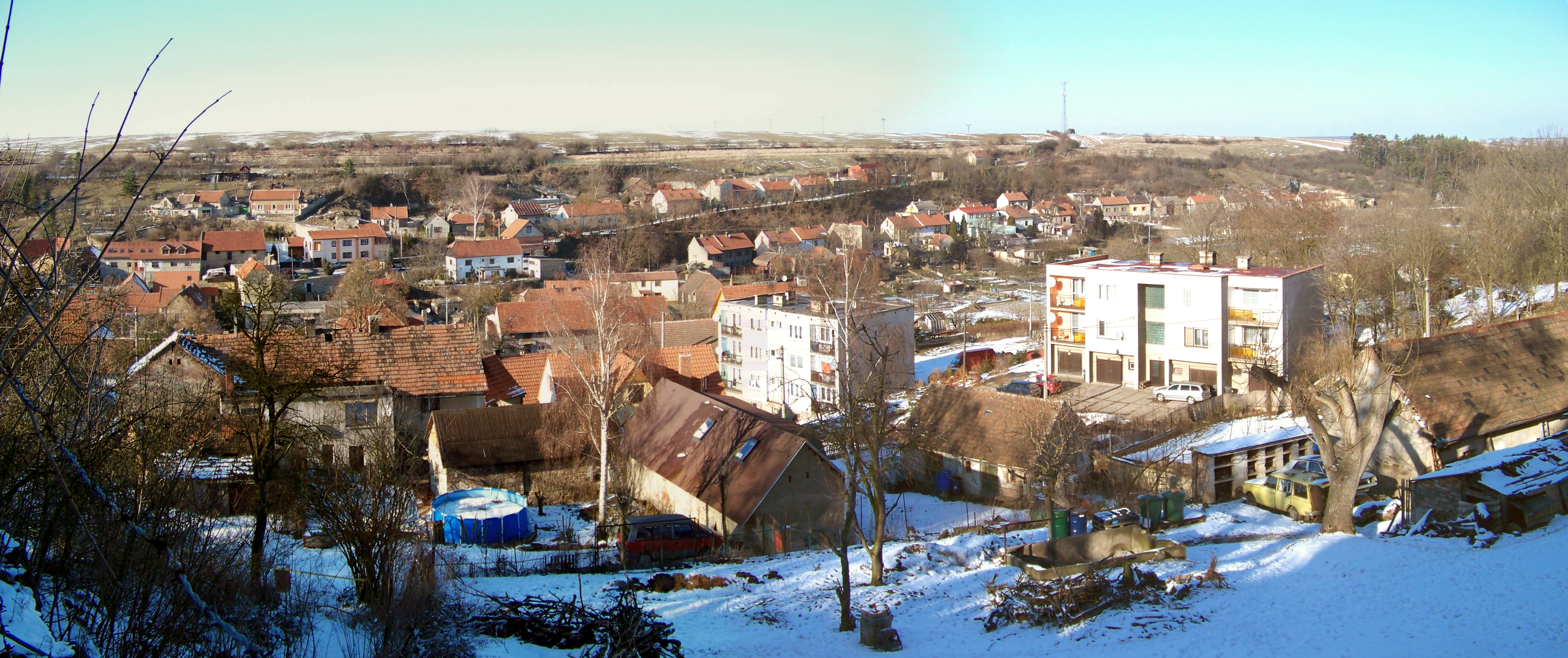
- General view

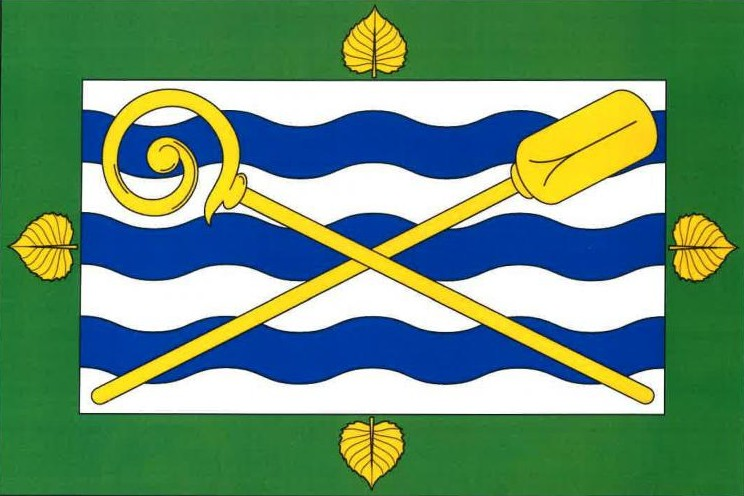
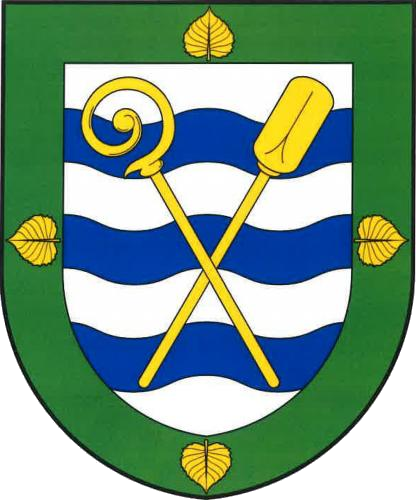
- Flag Coat of arms

- Location in the Czech Republic
- Coordinates: 50°13′27″N 14°13′15″E
- Country: Czech Republic
- Region: Central Bohemian
- District: Kladno
- First mentioned: 1318

Area
  - Total: 5.21 km^{2} (2.01 sq mi)
- Elevation: 234 m (768 ft)

Population (2026-01-01)
  - Total: 637
  - Density: 122/km^{2} (317/sq mi)
- Time zone: UTC+1 (CET)
  - Summer (DST): UTC+2 (CEST)
- Postal code: 273 26
- Website: www.ouslatina.cz

Slatina is a municipality and village in Kladno District in the Central Bohemian Region of the Czech Republic. It has about 600 inhabitants.

== Demographics ==
Historical population
Year	Pop.	±%
1869	530	—
1880	652	+23.0%
1890	615	−5.7%
1900	601	−2.3%
1910	649	+8.0%
1921	688	+6.0%
1930	657	−4.5%
1950	545	−17.0%
1961	537	−1.5%
1970	517	−3.7%
1980	503	−2.7%
1991	424	−15.7%
2001	403	−5.0%
2011	460	+14.1%
2021	667	+45.0%
Source: Censuses
