= Lipec =

Lipec may refer to:

- Lipec (Kolín District), Czech Republic
- Lipec, Vinica, North Macedonia
