= Bělušice =

Bělušice may refer to places in the Czech Republic:

- Bělušice (Kolín District), a municipality and village in the Central Bohemian Region
- Bělušice (Most District), a municipality and village in the Ústí nad Labem Region
