= Dománovice =

- Municipality
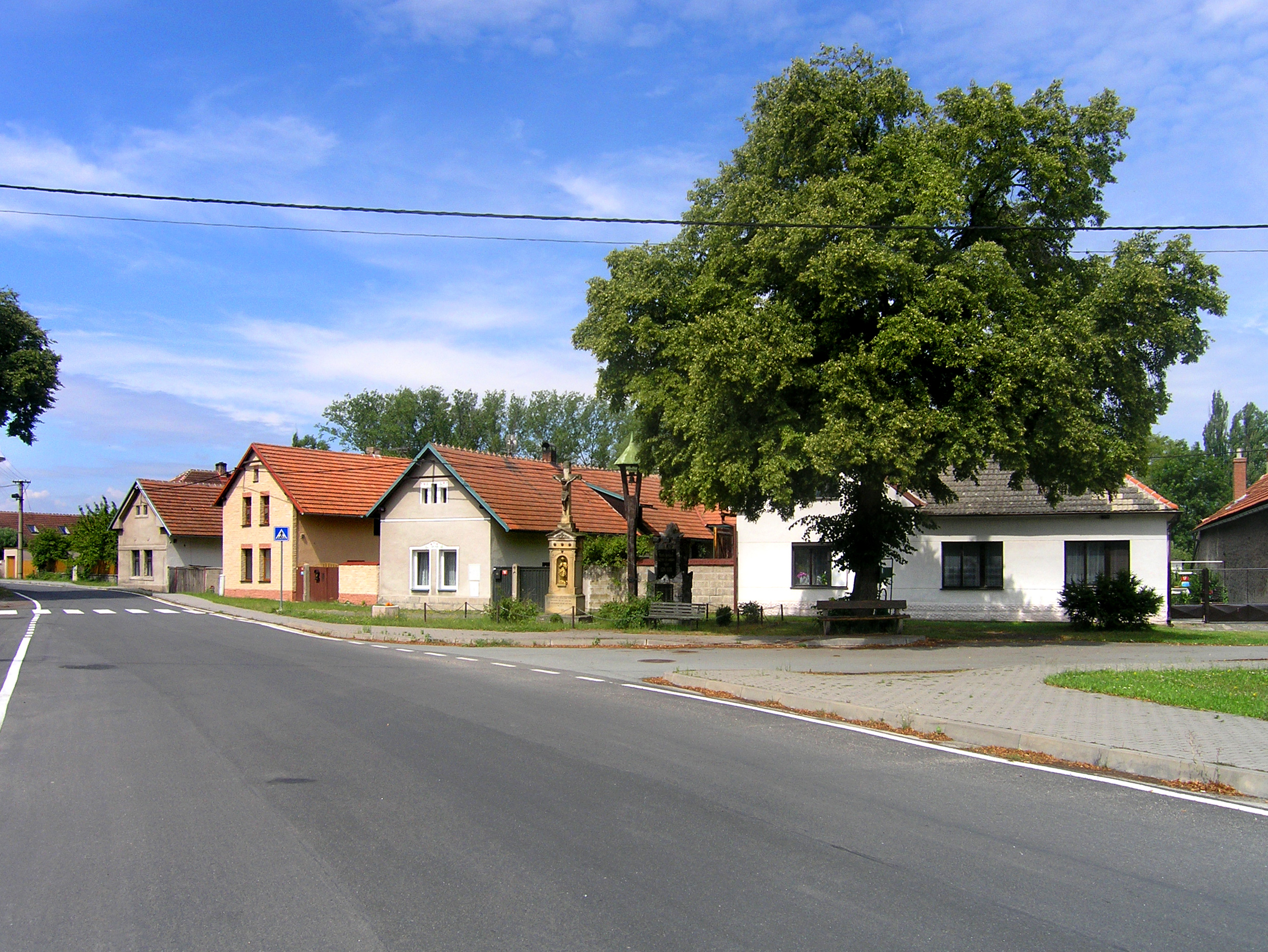
- Centre of Dománovice

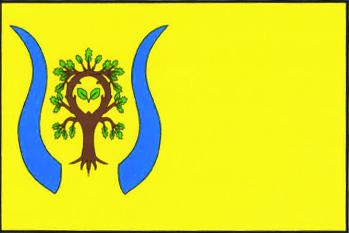
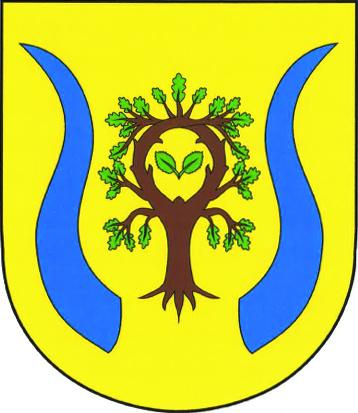
- Flag Coat of arms

- Location in the Czech Republic
- Coordinates: 50°6′43″N 15°19′21″E
- Country: Czech Republic
- Region: Central Bohemian
- District: Kolín
- First mentioned: 1378

Area
  - Total: 2.78 km^{2} (1.07 sq mi)
- Elevation: 254 m (833 ft)

Population (2026-01-01)
  - Total: 114
  - Density: 41.0/km^{2} (106/sq mi)
- Time zone: UTC+1 (CET)
  - Summer (DST): UTC+2 (CEST)
- Postal code: 280 02
- Website: www.domanovice.kolinsko.info

Dománovice is a municipality and village in Kolín District in the Central Bohemian Region of the Czech Republic. It has about 100 inhabitants.

== Demographics ==
Historical population
Year	Pop.	±%
1869	165	—
1880	188	+13.9%
1890	189	+0.5%
1900	216	+14.3%
1910	246	+13.9%
1921	238	−3.3%
1930	234	−1.7%
1950	174	−25.6%
1961	158	−9.2%
1970	147	−7.0%
1980	149	+1.4%
1991	123	−17.4%
2001	132	+7.3%
2011	126	−4.5%
2021	118	−6.3%
Source: Censuses
