= Pňov-Předhradí =

- Municipality
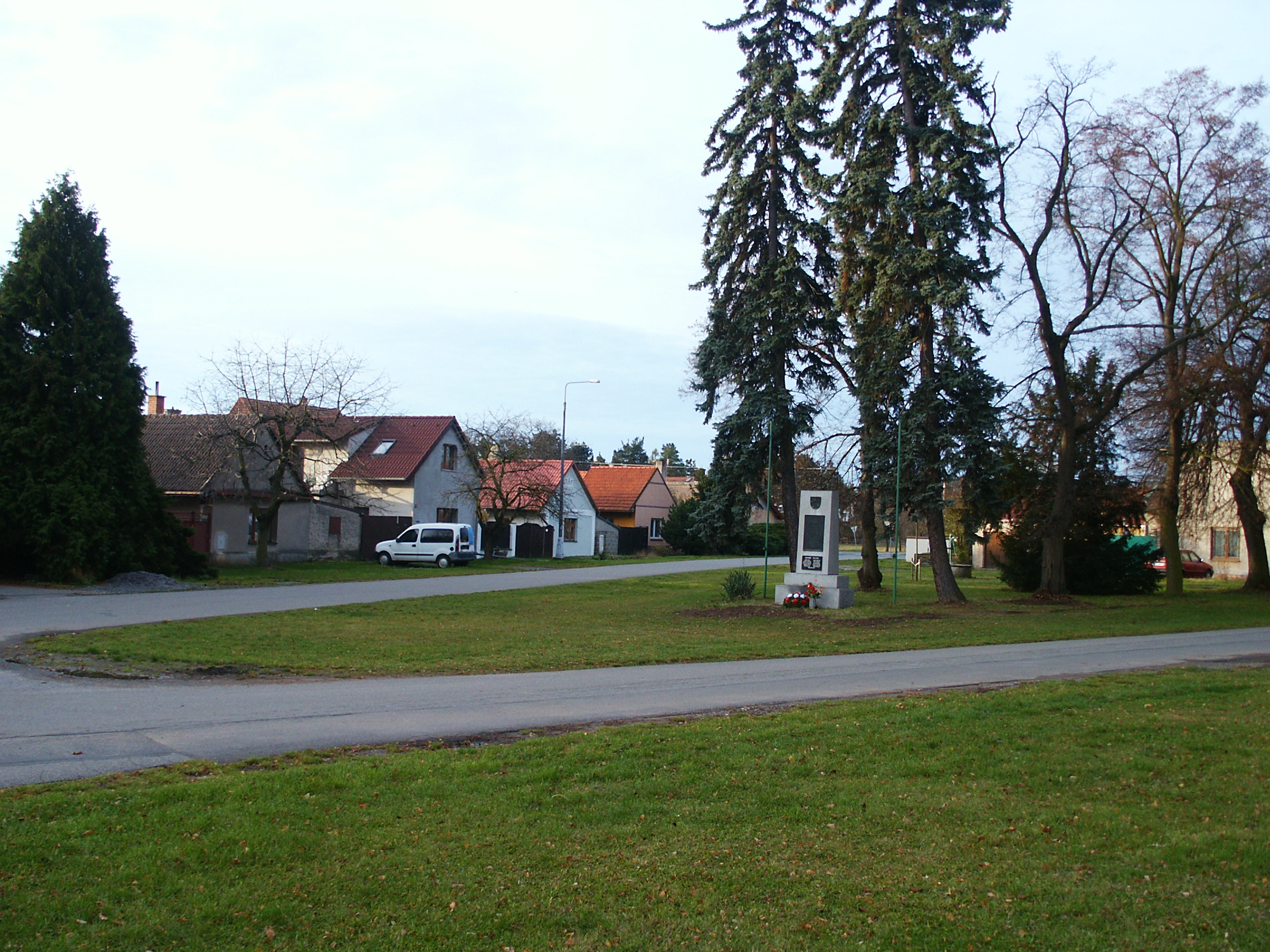
- Centre of Předhradí

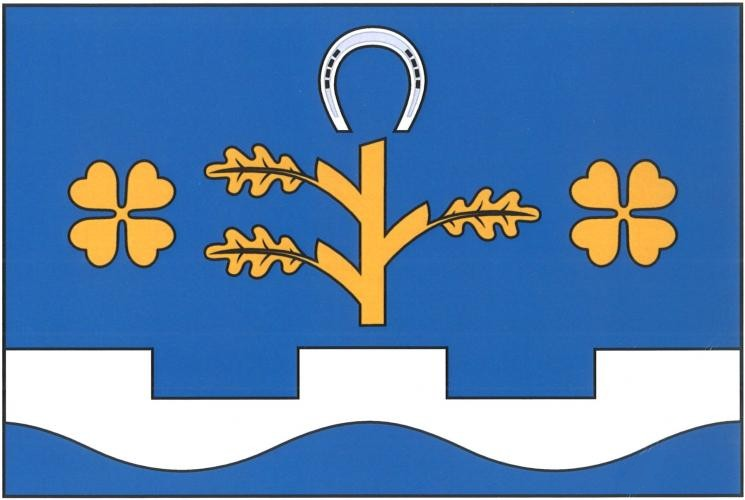
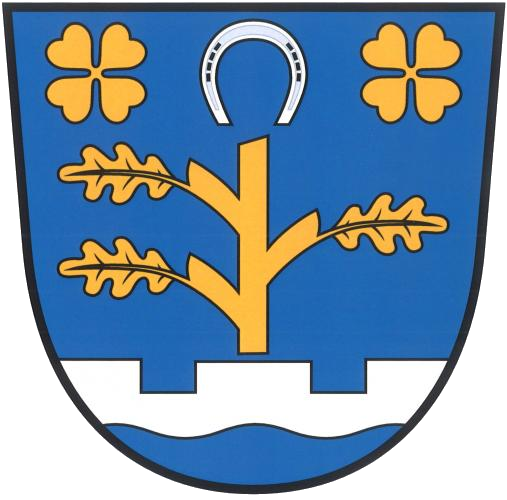
- Flag Coat of arms

- Location in the Czech Republic
- Coordinates: 50°5′9″N 15°8′53″E
- Country: Czech Republic
- Region: Central Bohemian
- District: Kolín
- First mentioned: 1265

Area
  - Total: 9.42 km^{2} (3.64 sq mi)
- Elevation: 190 m (620 ft)

Population (2026-01-01)
  - Total: 621
  - Density: 65.9/km^{2} (171/sq mi)
- Time zone: UTC+1 (CET)
  - Summer (DST): UTC+2 (CEST)
- Postal code: 289 41
- Website: pnov-predhradi.wbs.cz

Pňov-Předhradí is a municipality in Kolín District in the Central Bohemian Region of the Czech Republic. It has about 600 inhabitants.

== Administrative division ==
Pňov-Předhradí consists of three municipal parts (in brackets population according to the 2021 census):

- Pňov (280)
- Předhradí (249)
- Klipec (102)

== Demographics ==
Historical population
Year	Pop.	±%
1869	721	—
1880	864	+19.8%
1890	954	+10.4%
1900	963	+0.9%
1910	981	+1.9%
1921	1,004	+2.3%
1930	923	−8.1%
1950	799	−13.4%
1961	797	−0.3%
1970	723	−9.3%
1980	672	−7.1%
1991	581	−13.5%
2001	535	−7.9%
2011	521	−2.6%
2021	631	+21.1%
Source: Censuses
