= Uhlířská Lhota =

- Municipality
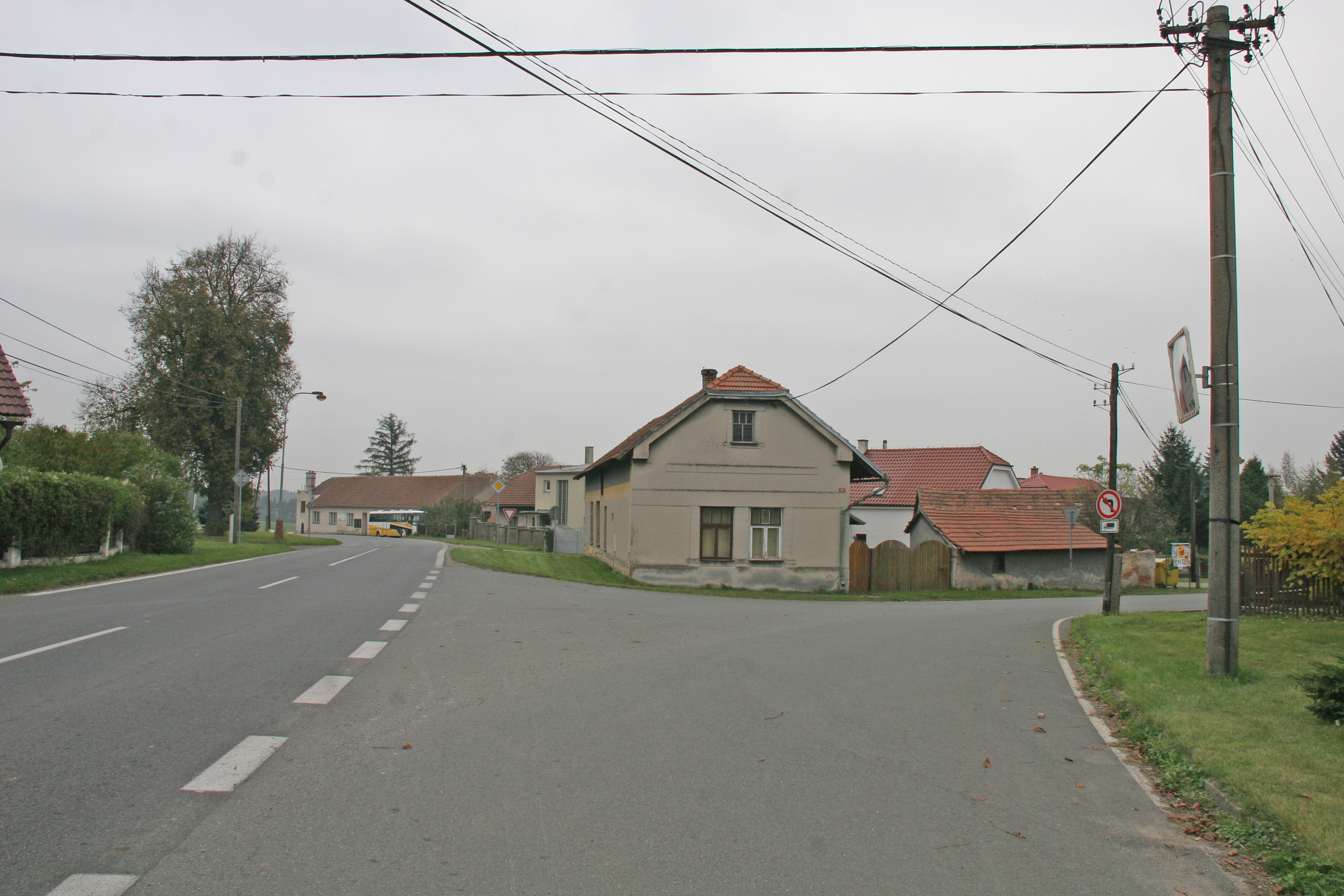
- Crossroads

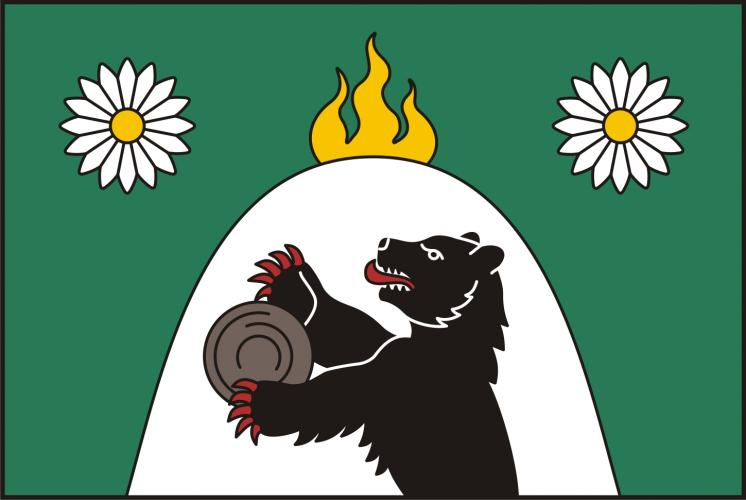
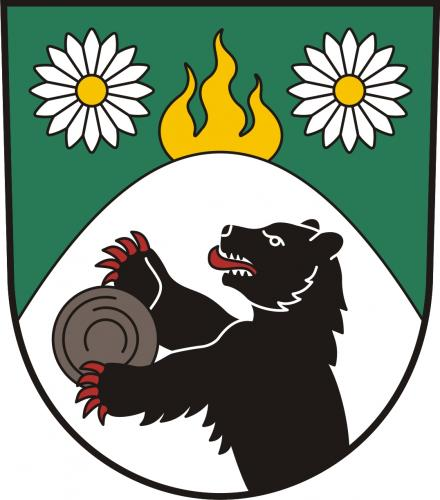
- Flag Coat of arms

- Location in the Czech Republic
- Coordinates: 50°4′44″N 15°23′28″E
- Country: Czech Republic
- Region: Central Bohemian
- District: Kolín
- First mentioned: 1436

Area
  - Total: 9.09 km^{2} (3.51 sq mi)
- Elevation: 235 m (771 ft)

Population (2026-01-01)
  - Total: 356
  - Density: 39.2/km^{2} (101/sq mi)
- Time zone: UTC+1 (CET)
  - Summer (DST): UTC+2 (CEST)
- Postal code: 281 26
- Website: www.uhlirskalhota.cz

Uhlířská Lhota is a municipality and village in Kolín District in the Central Bohemian Region of the Czech Republic. It has about 400 inhabitants.

== Administrative division ==
Uhlířská Lhota consists of two municipal parts (in brackets population according to the 2021 census):

- Uhlířská Lhota (200)
- Rasochy (144)

== Demographics ==
Historical population
| Year | Pop. | ±% |
|---|---|---|
| 1869 | 642 | — |
| 1880 | 719 | +12.0% |
| 1890 | 661 | −8.1% |
| 1900 | 685 | +3.6% |
| 1910 | 698 | +1.9% |
| 1921 | 651 | −6.7% |
| 1930 | 638 | −2.0% |
| 1950 | 504 | −21.0% |
| 1961 | 515 | +2.2% |
| 1970 | 448 | −13.0% |
| 1980 | 411 | −8.3% |
| 1991 | 339 | −17.5% |
| 2001 | 354 | +4.4% |
| 2011 | 354 | +0.0% |
| 2021 | 344 | −2.8% |
Source: Censuses
