= Zalešany =

- Municipality
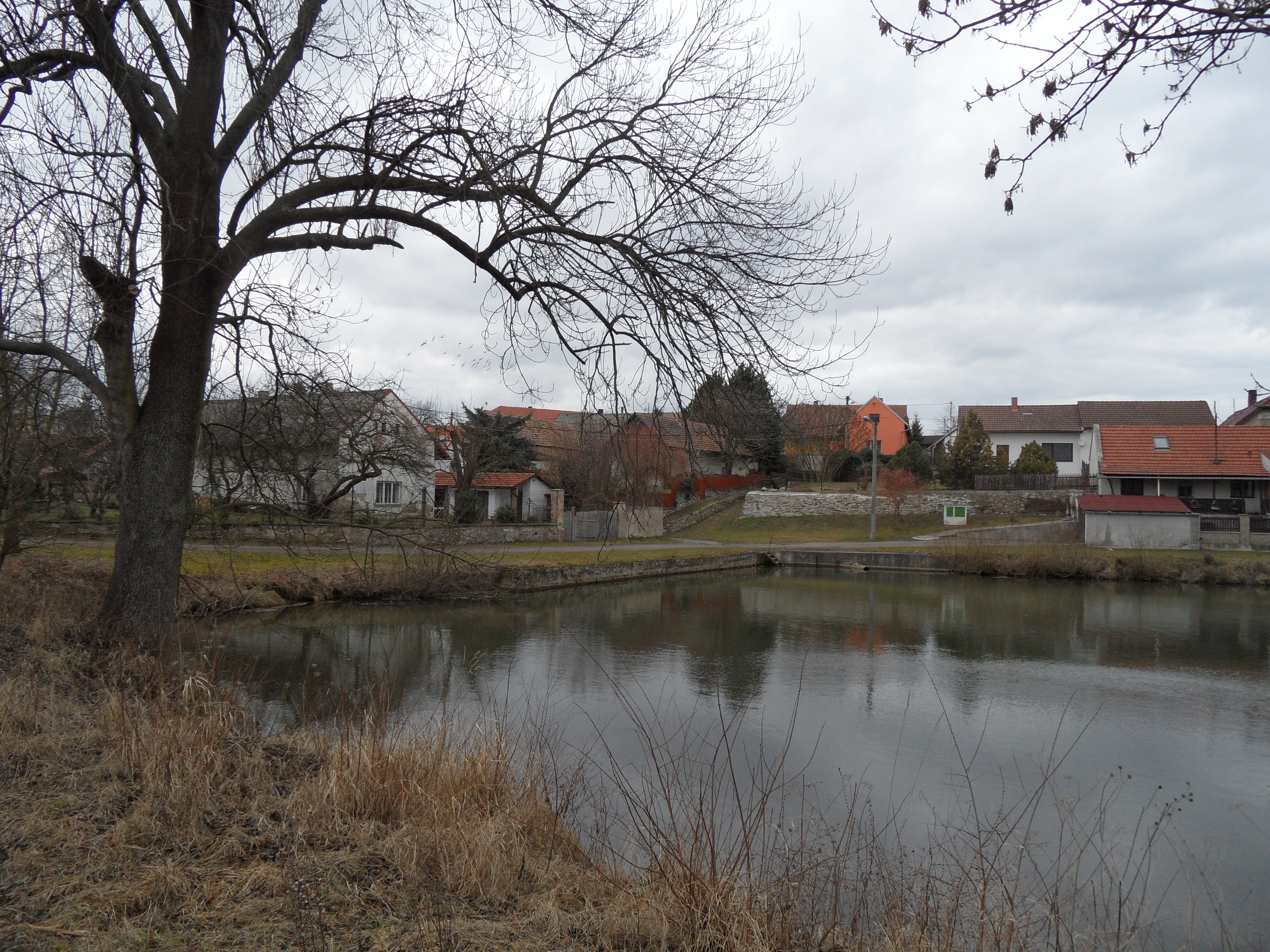
- A pond in Zalešany

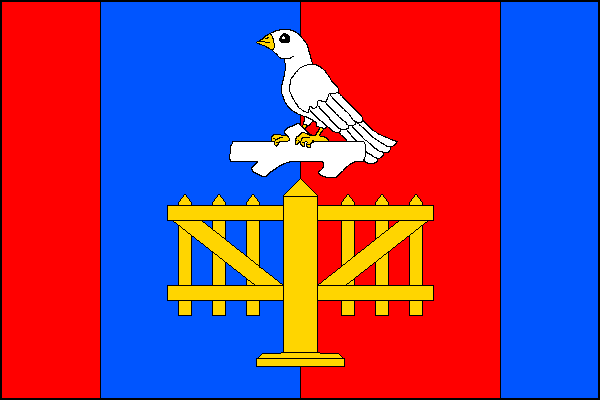
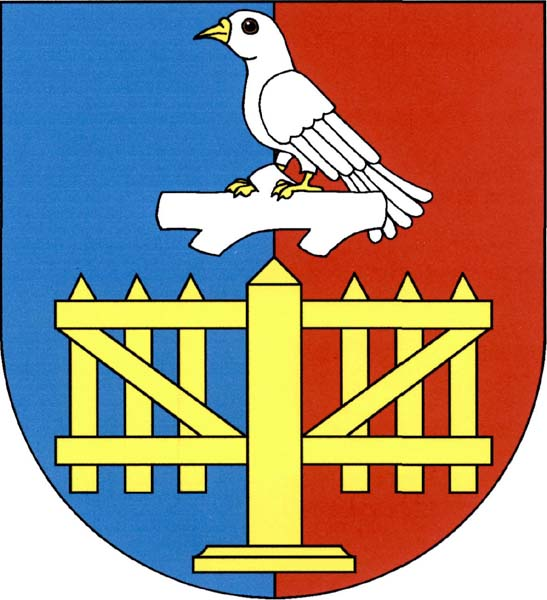
- Flag Coat of arms

- Location in the Czech Republic
- Coordinates: 50°2′9″N 15°0′28″E
- Country: Czech Republic
- Region: Central Bohemian
- District: Kolín
- First mentioned: 1319

Area
  - Total: 4.90 km^{2} (1.89 sq mi)
- Elevation: 240 m (790 ft)

Population (2026-01-01)
  - Total: 104
  - Density: 21.2/km^{2} (55.0/sq mi)
- Time zone: UTC+1 (CET)
  - Summer (DST): UTC+2 (CEST)
- Postal code: 280 02
- Website: www.zalesany.eu

Zalešany is a municipality and village in Kolín District in the Central Bohemian Region of the Czech Republic. It has about 100 inhabitants.

== Administrative division ==
Zalešany consists of two municipal parts (in brackets population according to the 2021 census):

- Zalešany (85)
- Přebozy (34)

== Demographics ==
Historical population
Year	Pop.	±%
1869	425	—
1880	456	+7.3%
1890	524	+14.9%
1900	527	+0.6%
1910	501	−4.9%
1921	506	+1.0%
1930	485	−4.2%
1950	380	−21.6%
1961	333	−12.4%
1970	268	−19.5%
1980	192	−28.4%
1991	131	−31.8%
2001	104	−20.6%
2011	116	+11.5%
2021	119	+2.6%
Source: Censuses
