= Kořenice =

- Municipality
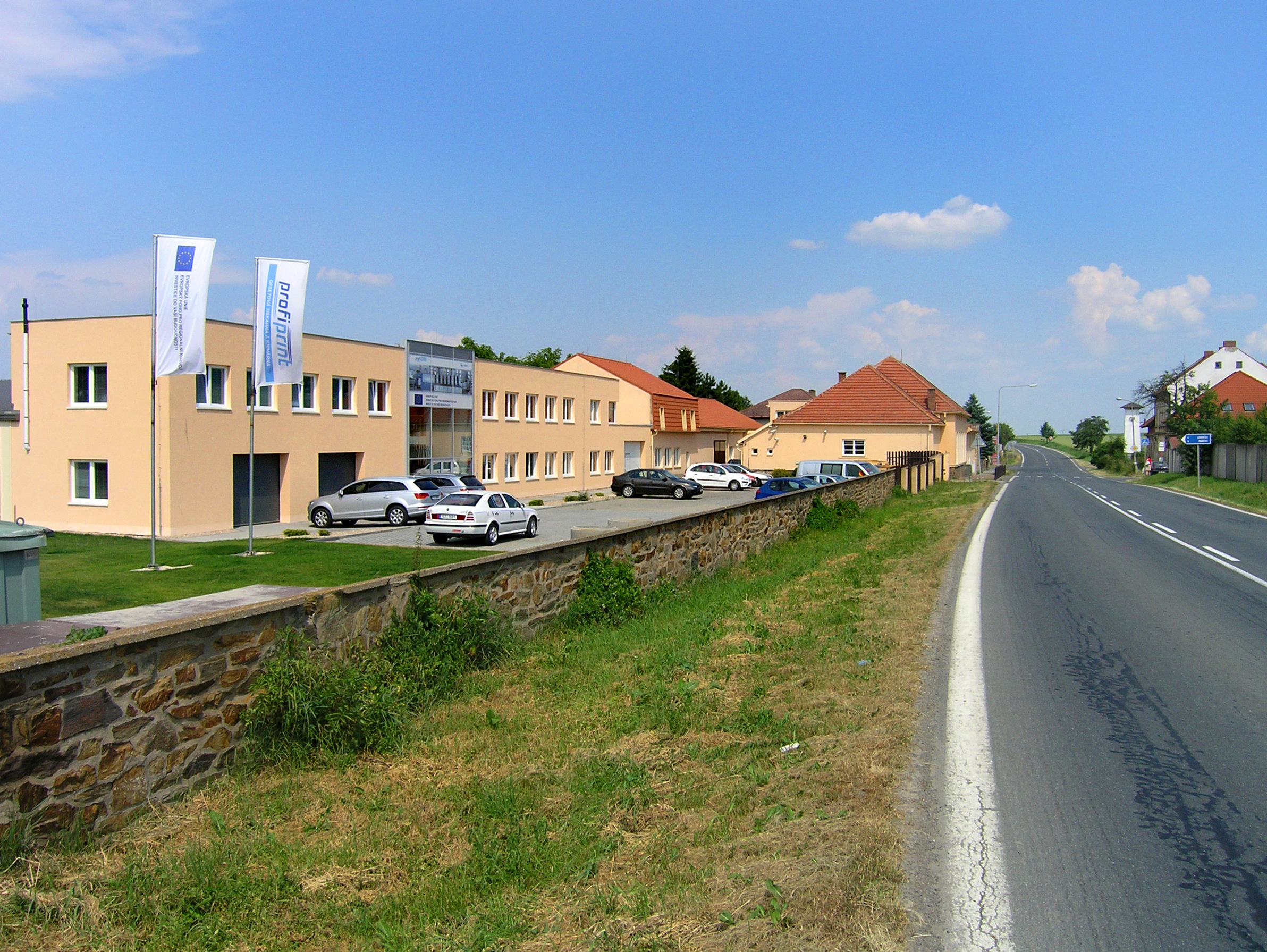
- Pučery, a part of Kořenice

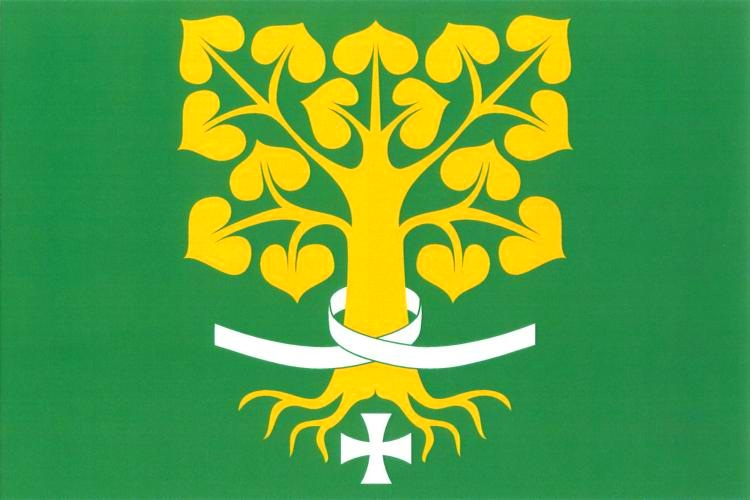
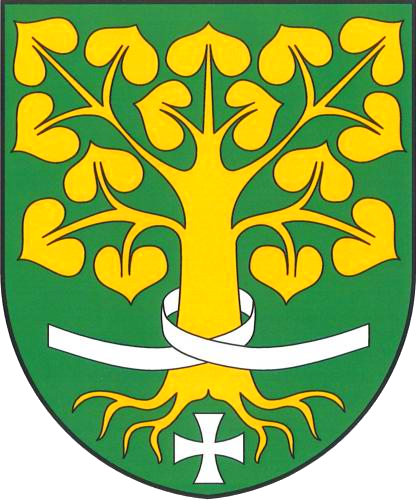
- Flag Coat of arms

- Location in the Czech Republic
- Coordinates: 49°58′38″N 15°8′27″E
- Country: Czech Republic
- Region: Central Bohemian
- District: Kolín
- First mentioned: 1358

Area
  - Total: 10.29 km^{2} (3.97 sq mi)
- Elevation: 323 m (1,060 ft)

Population (2026-01-01)
  - Total: 631
  - Density: 61.3/km^{2} (159/sq mi)
- Time zone: UTC+1 (CET)
  - Summer (DST): UTC+2 (CEST)
- Postal codes: 280 02, 281 44
- Website: www.korenice.cz

Kořenice is a municipality and village in Kolín District in the Central Bohemian Region of the Czech Republic. It has about 600 inhabitants.

== Administrative division ==
Kořenice consists of three municipal parts (in brackets population according to the 2021 census):

- Kořenice (261)
- Chotouchov (211)
- Pučery (147)

== Demographics ==
Historical population
Year	Pop.	±%
1869	1,051	—
1880	1,096	+4.3%
1890	1,138	+3.8%
1900	1,167	+2.5%
1910	1,137	−2.6%
1921	1,069	−6.0%
1930	1,020	−4.6%
1950	815	−20.1%
1961	849	+4.2%
1970	769	−9.4%
1980	687	−10.7%
1991	607	−11.6%
2001	579	−4.6%
2011	549	−5.2%
2021	619	+12.8%
Source: Censuses
