= Kšely =

- Municipality
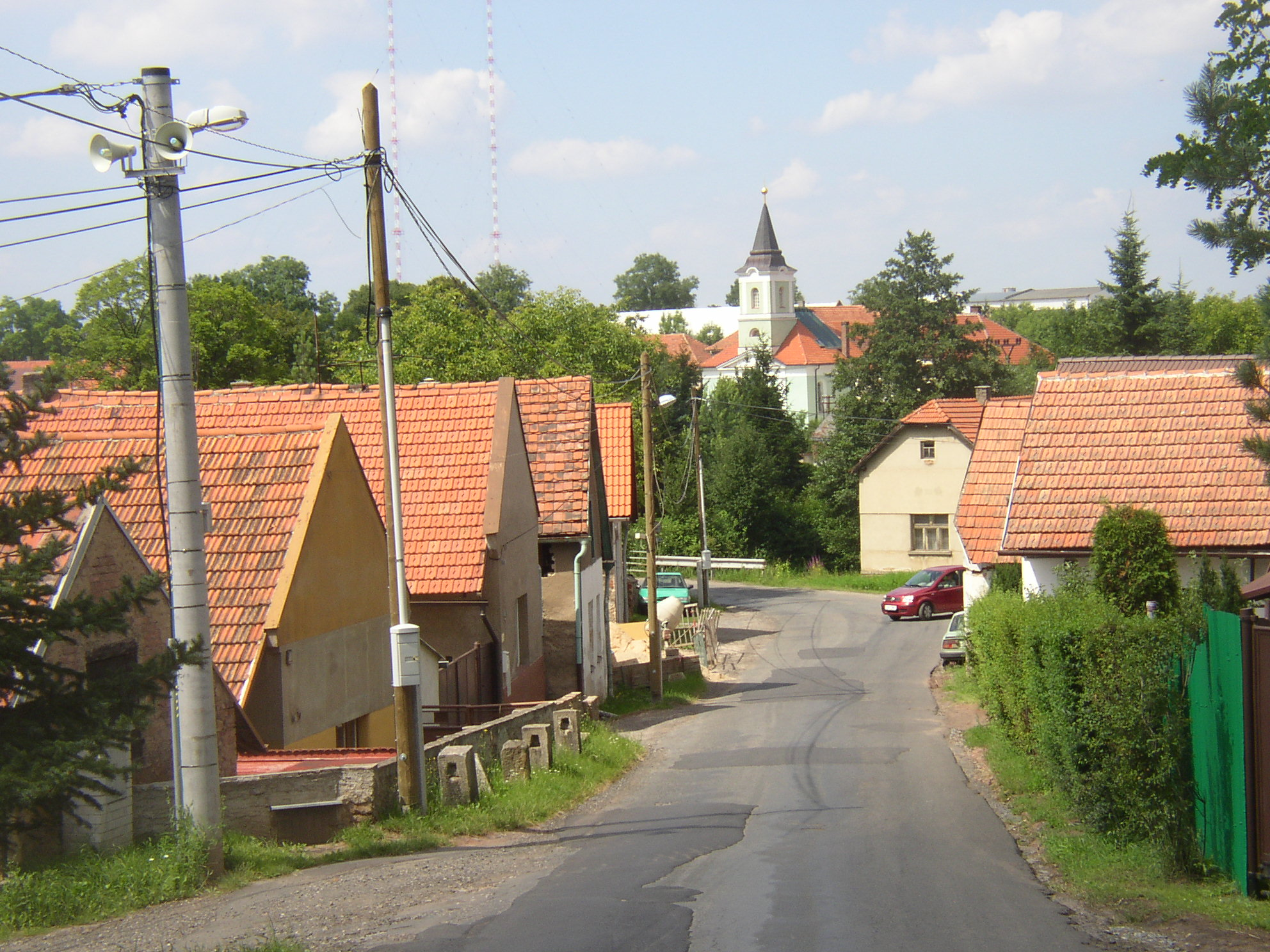
- View from the southeast

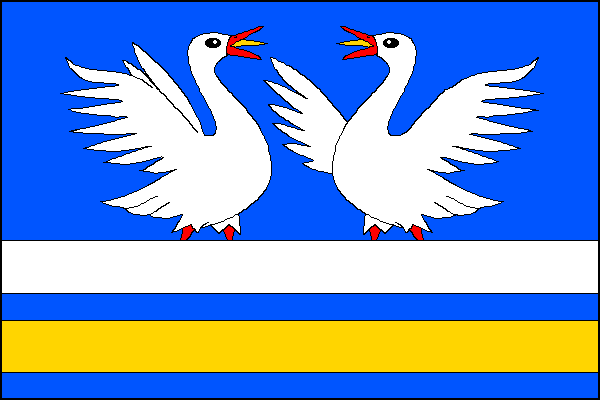
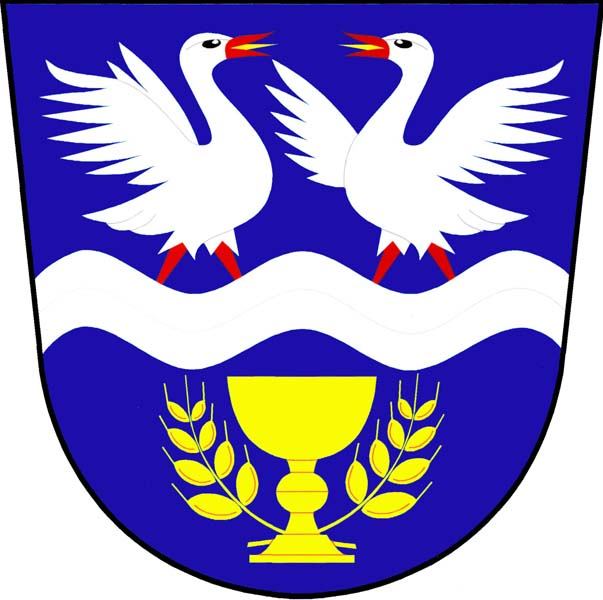
- Flag Coat of arms

- Location in the Czech Republic
- Coordinates: 50°2′37″N 14°54′7″E
- Country: Czech Republic
- Region: Central Bohemian
- District: Kolín
- First mentioned: 1266

Area
  - Total: 4.52 km^{2} (1.75 sq mi)
- Elevation: 248 m (814 ft)

Population (2026-01-01)
  - Total: 223
  - Density: 49.3/km^{2} (128/sq mi)
- Time zone: UTC+1 (CET)
  - Summer (DST): UTC+2 (CEST)
- Postal code: 282 01
- Website: www.ksely.cz

Kšely is a municipality and village in Kolín District in the Central Bohemian Region of the Czech Republic. It has about 200 inhabitants.

== Demographics ==
Historical population
Year	Pop.	±%
1869	447	—
1880	482	+7.8%
1890	442	−8.3%
1900	427	−3.4%
1910	472	+10.5%
1921	430	−8.9%
1930	432	+0.5%
1950	285	−34.0%
1961	283	−0.7%
1970	255	−9.9%
1980	276	+8.2%
1991	218	−21.0%
2001	228	+4.6%
2011	232	+1.8%
2021	246	+6.0%
Source: Censuses
