= Krychnov =

- Municipality
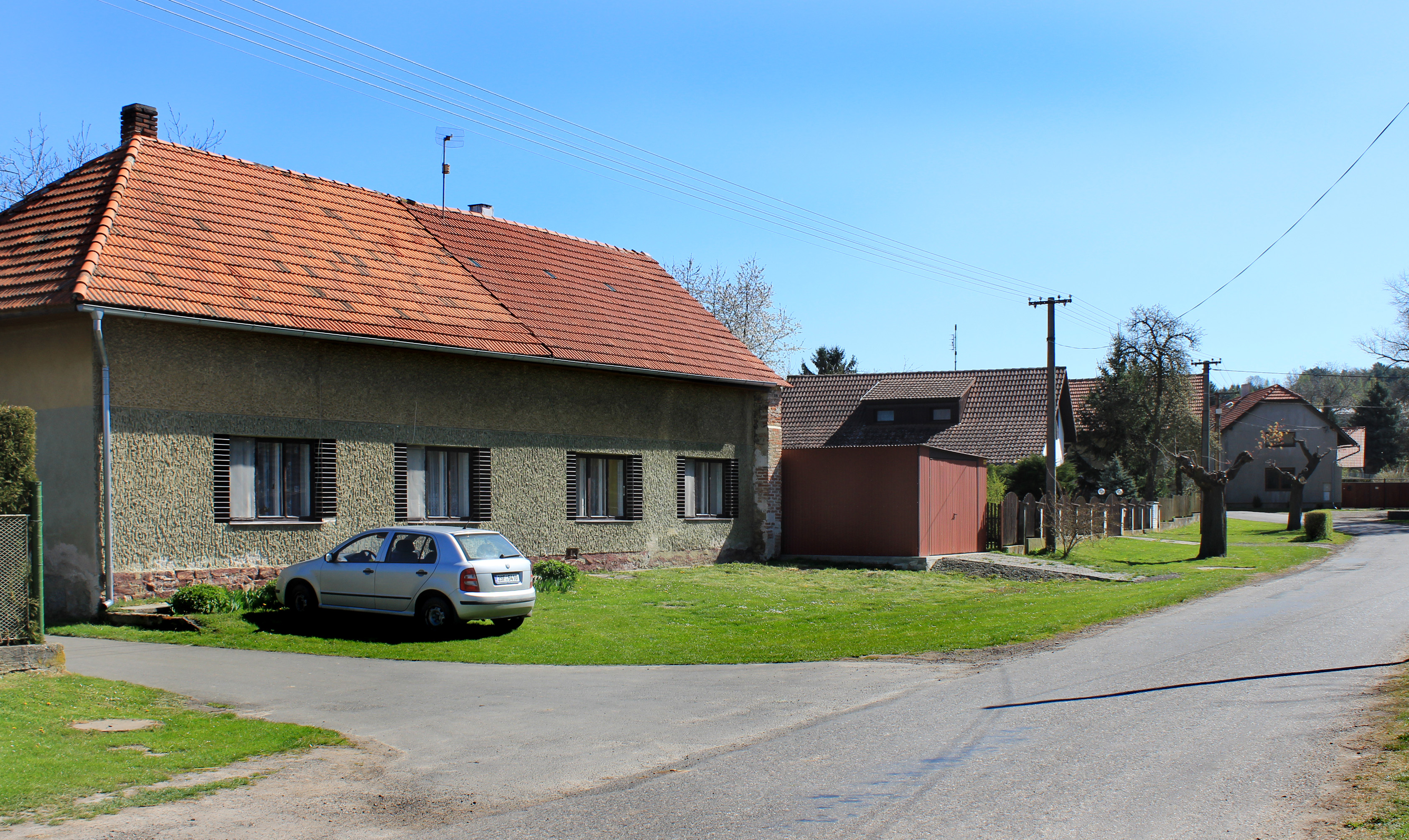
- Eastern part of Krychlov

- Location in the Czech Republic
- Coordinates: 50°0′22″N 15°3′28″E
- Country: Czech Republic
- Region: Central Bohemian
- District: Kolín
- First mentioned: 1436

Area
  - Total: 2.58 km^{2} (1.00 sq mi)
- Elevation: 269 m (883 ft)

Population (2026-01-01)
  - Total: 107
  - Density: 41.5/km^{2} (107/sq mi)
- Time zone: UTC+1 (CET)
  - Summer (DST): UTC+2 (CEST)
- Postal code: 280 02
- Website: www.krychnov.cz

Krychnov is a municipality and village in Kolín District in the Central Bohemian Region of the Czech Republic. It has about 100 inhabitants.

== Demographics ==
Historical population
Year	Pop.	±%
1869	265	—
1880	286	+7.9%
1890	306	+7.0%
1900	299	−2.3%
1910	267	−10.7%
1921	243	−9.0%
1930	216	−11.1%
1950	148	−31.5%
1961	177	+19.6%
1970	172	−2.8%
1980	147	−14.5%
1991	107	−27.2%
2001	101	−5.6%
2011	108	+6.9%
2021	104	−3.7%
Source: Censuses
