= Vrátkov =

- Municipality
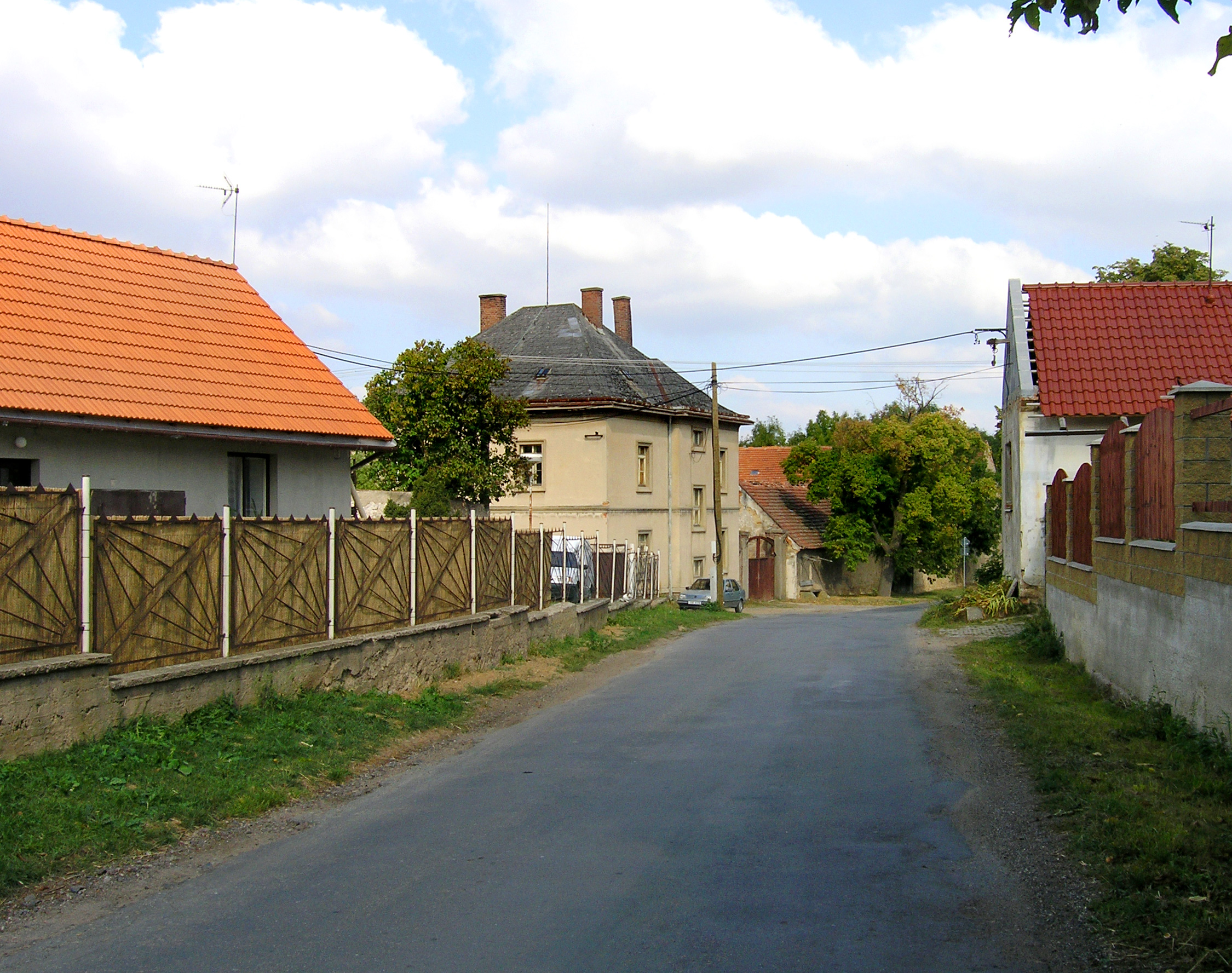
- Southern part of Vrátkov

- Location in the Czech Republic
- Coordinates: 50°2′49″N 14°50′5″E
- Country: Czech Republic
- Region: Central Bohemian
- District: Kolín
- First mentioned: 1381

Area
  - Total: 2.42 km^{2} (0.93 sq mi)
- Elevation: 275 m (902 ft)

Population (2026-01-01)
  - Total: 306
  - Density: 126/km^{2} (327/sq mi)
- Time zone: UTC+1 (CET)
  - Summer (DST): UTC+2 (CEST)
- Postal code: 282 01
- Website: www.vratkov.cz

Vrátkov is a municipality and village in Kolín District in the Central Bohemian Region of the Czech Republic. It has about 300 inhabitants.

== Demographics ==
Historical population
| Year | Pop. | ±% |
|---|---|---|
| 1869 | 283 | — |
| 1880 | 279 | −1.4% |
| 1890 | 310 | +11.1% |
| 1900 | 293 | −5.5% |
| 1910 | 331 | +13.0% |
| 1921 | 355 | +7.3% |
| 1930 | 355 | +0.0% |
| 1950 | 302 | −14.9% |
| 1961 | 318 | +5.3% |
| 1970 | 282 | −11.3% |
| 1980 | 252 | −10.6% |
| 1991 | 214 | −15.1% |
| 2001 | 224 | +4.7% |
| 2011 | 247 | +10.3% |
| 2021 | 248 | +0.4% |
Source: Censuses
