= Mrzky =

- Municipality
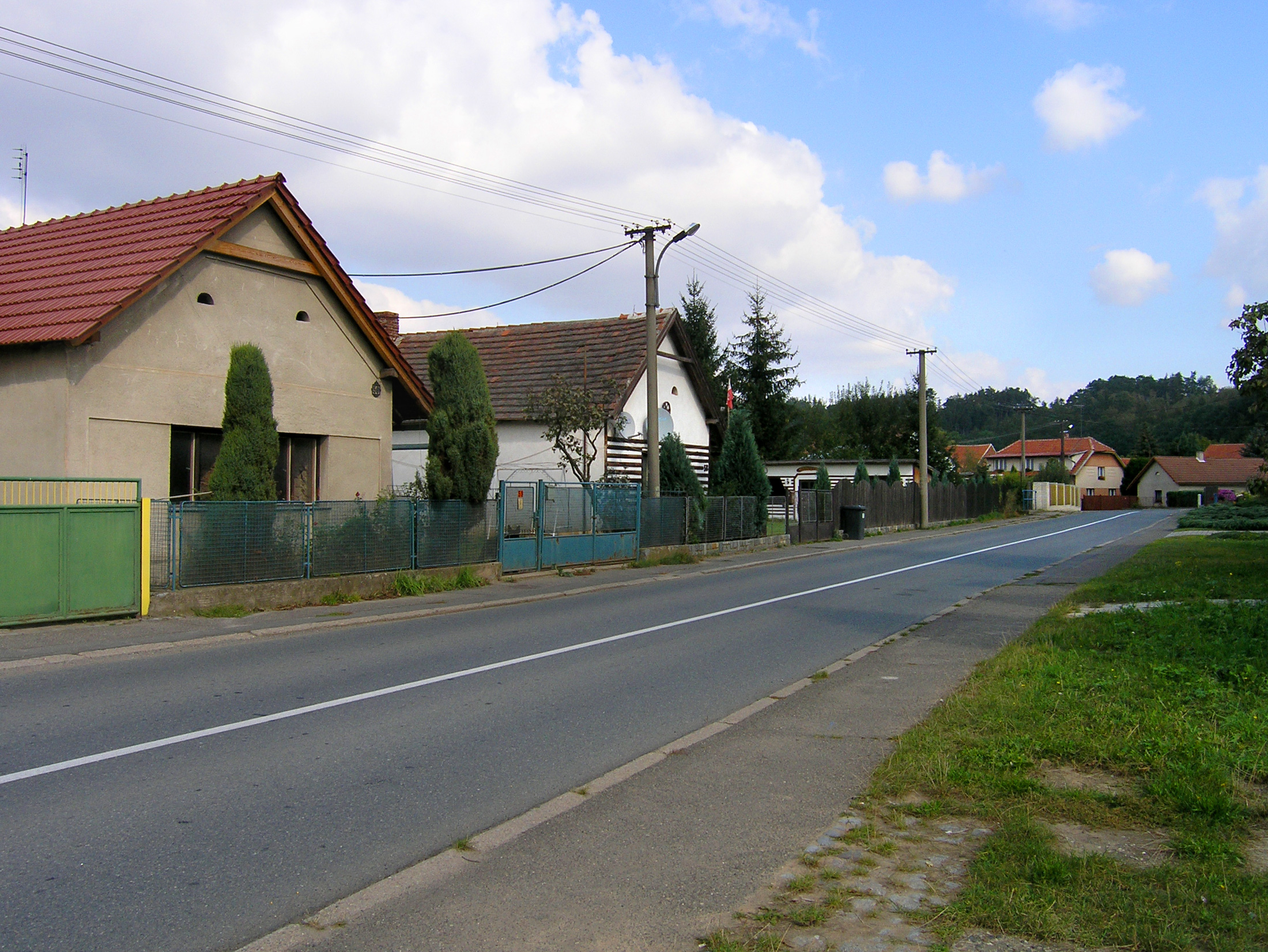
- Main street

- Location in the Czech Republic
- Coordinates: 50°2′41″N 14°48′36″E
- Country: Czech Republic
- Region: Central Bohemian
- District: Kolín
- First mentioned: 1295

Area
  - Total: 2.86 km^{2} (1.10 sq mi)
- Elevation: 245 m (804 ft)

Population (2026-01-01)
  - Total: 169
  - Density: 59.1/km^{2} (153/sq mi)
- Time zone: UTC+1 (CET)
  - Summer (DST): UTC+2 (CEST)
- Postal code: 282 01
- Website: www.mrzky.cz

Mrzky is a municipality and village in Kolín District in the Central Bohemian Region of the Czech Republic. It has about 200 inhabitants.

== Demographics ==
Historical population
Year	Pop.	±%
1869	341	—
1880	358	+5.0%
1890	373	+4.2%
1900	381	+2.1%
1910	377	−1.0%
1921	346	−8.2%
1930	407	+17.6%
1950	310	−23.8%
1961	272	−12.3%
1970	249	−8.5%
1980	161	−35.3%
1991	138	−14.3%
2001	112	−18.8%
2011	176	+57.1%
2021	177	+0.6%
Source: Censuses
