= Volárna =

- Municipality
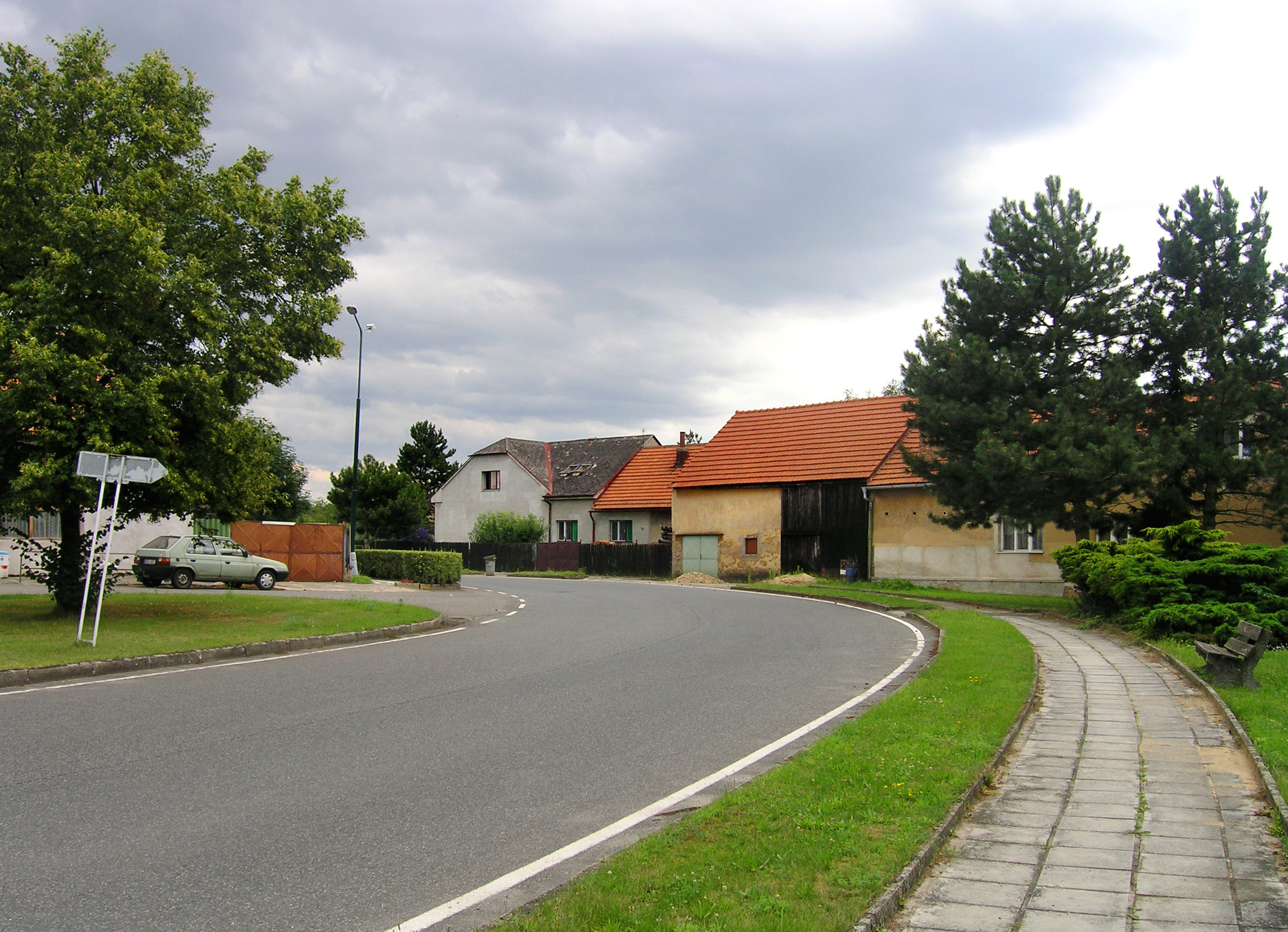
- Main road

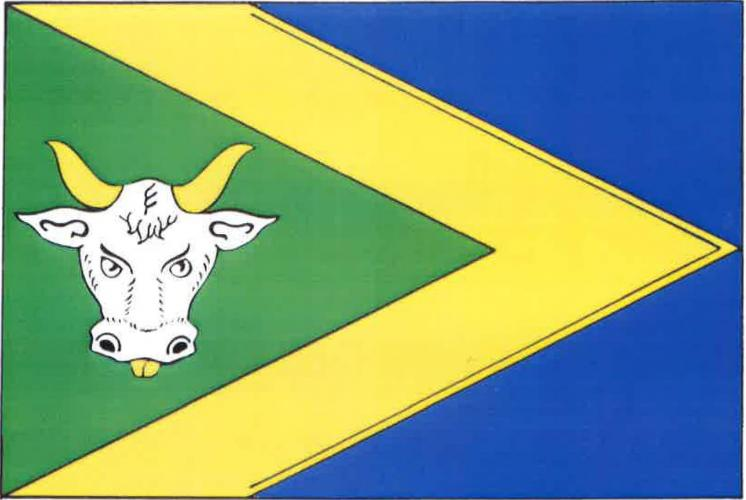
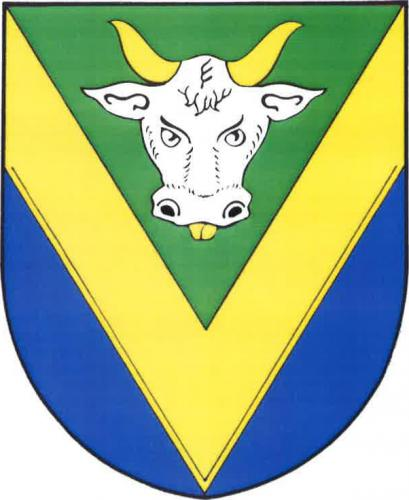
- Flag Coat of arms

- Location in the Czech Republic
- Coordinates: 50°5′31″N 15°14′26″E
- Country: Czech Republic
- Region: Central Bohemian
- District: Kolín
- First mentioned: 1778

Area
  - Total: 4.06 km^{2} (1.57 sq mi)
- Elevation: 196 m (643 ft)

Population (2026-01-01)
  - Total: 554
  - Density: 136/km^{2} (353/sq mi)
- Time zone: UTC+1 (CET)
  - Summer (DST): UTC+2 (CEST)
- Postal code: 280 02
- Website: www.volarna.cz

Volárna is a municipality and village in Kolín District in the Central Bohemian Region of the Czech Republic. It has about 600 inhabitants.

== Demographics ==
Historical population
Year	Pop.	±%
1869	530	—
1880	541	+2.1%
1890	555	+2.6%
1900	520	−6.3%
1910	581	+11.7%
1921	602	+3.6%
1930	584	−3.0%
1950	487	−16.6%
1961	524	+7.6%
1970	514	−1.9%
1980	473	−8.0%
1991	436	−7.8%
2001	458	+5.0%
2011	513	+12.0%
2021	510	−0.6%
Source: Censuses
