= Skvrňov =

- Municipality
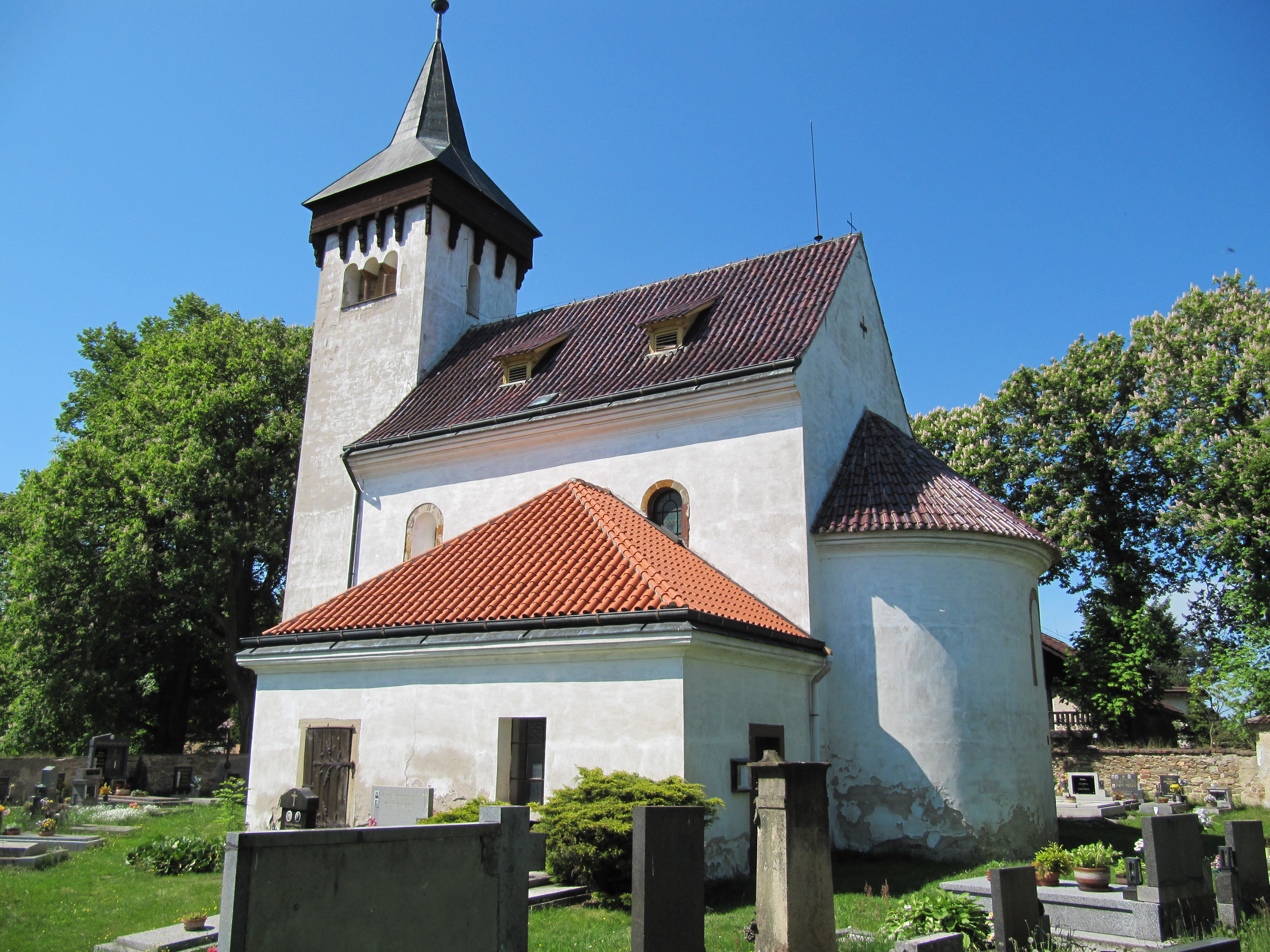
- Church of Saint Gall

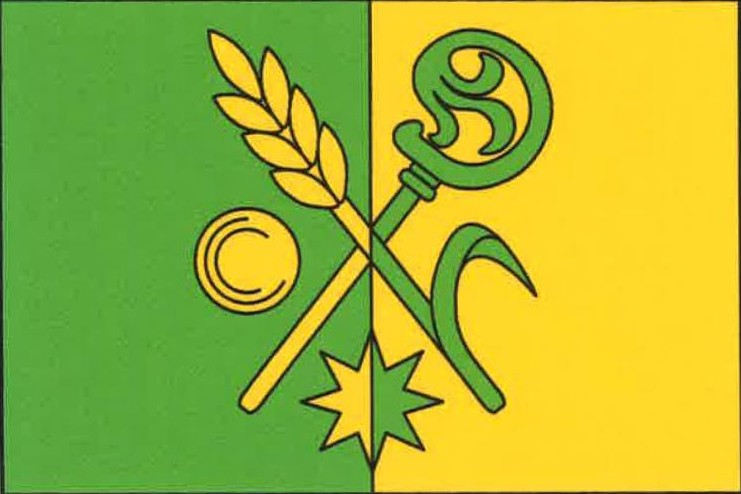
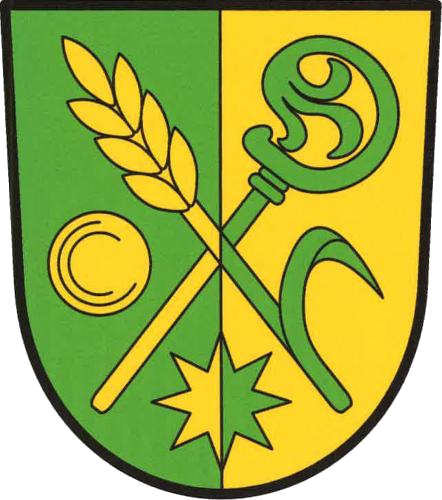
- Flag Coat of arms

- Location in the Czech Republic
- Coordinates: 49°53′50″N 15°0′7″E
- Country: Czech Republic
- Region: Central Bohemian
- District: Kolín
- First mentioned: 1295

Area
  - Total: 6.17 km^{2} (2.38 sq mi)
- Elevation: 393 m (1,289 ft)

Population (2026-01-01)
  - Total: 226
  - Density: 36.6/km^{2} (94.9/sq mi)
- Time zone: UTC+1 (CET)
  - Summer (DST): UTC+2 (CEST)
- Postal code: 281 44
- Website: www.skvrnov.cz

Skvrňov is a municipality and village in Kolín District in the Central Bohemian Region of the Czech Republic. It has about 200 inhabitants.

== Demographics ==
Historical population
| Year | Pop. | ±% |
|---|---|---|
| 1869 | 494 | — |
| 1880 | 467 | −5.5% |
| 1890 | 500 | +7.1% |
| 1900 | 483 | −3.4% |
| 1910 | 453 | −6.2% |
| 1921 | 446 | −1.5% |
| 1930 | 403 | −9.6% |
| 1950 | 320 | −20.6% |
| 1961 | 314 | −1.9% |
| 1970 | 257 | −18.2% |
| 1980 | 251 | −2.3% |
| 1991 | 212 | −15.5% |
| 2001 | 166 | −21.7% |
| 2011 | 181 | +9.0% |
| 2021 | 219 | +21.0% |
Source: Censuses
