= Tuchoraz =

- Municipality
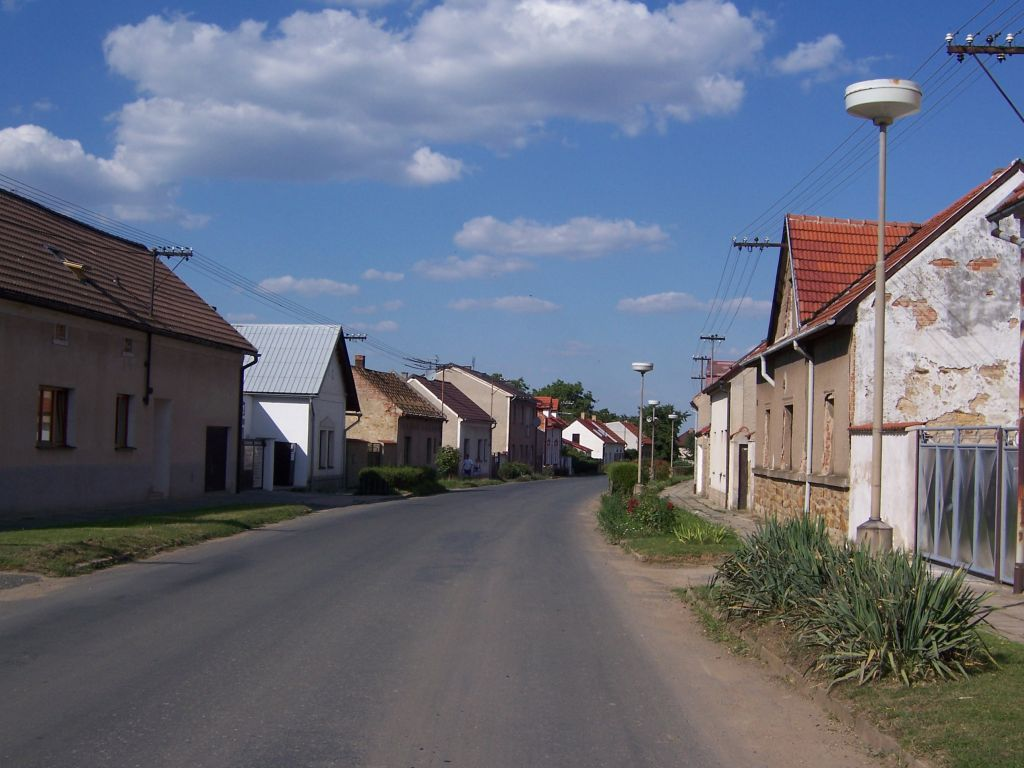
- Main street

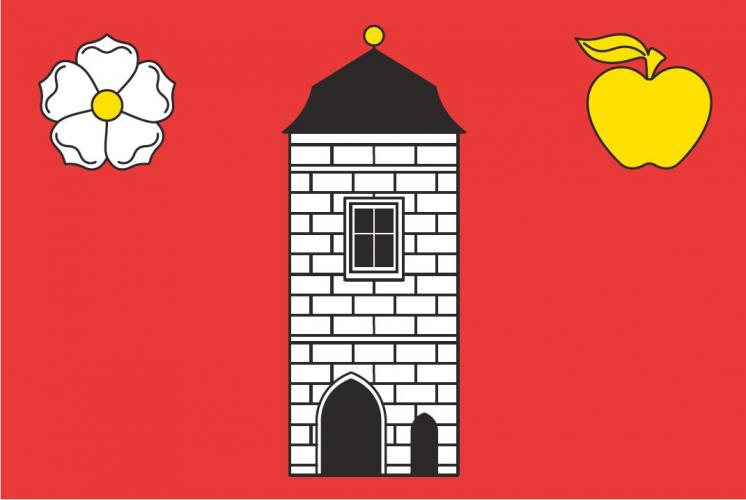
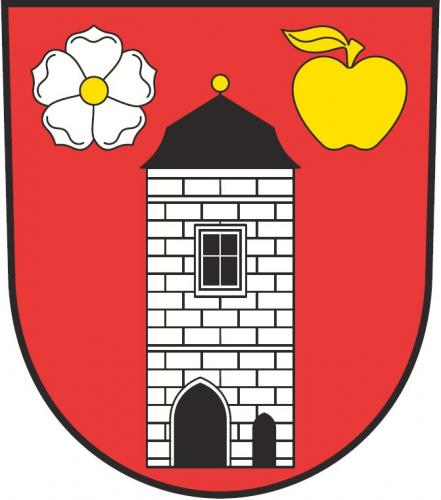
- Flag Coat of arms

- Location in the Czech Republic
- Coordinates: 50°2′55″N 14°50′57″E
- Country: Czech Republic
- Region: Central Bohemian
- District: Kolín
- First mentioned: 1295

Area
  - Total: 5.93 km^{2} (2.29 sq mi)
- Elevation: 273 m (896 ft)

Population (2026-01-01)
  - Total: 682
  - Density: 115/km^{2} (298/sq mi)
- Time zone: UTC+1 (CET)
  - Summer (DST): UTC+2 (CEST)
- Postal code: 282 01
- Website: www.tuchoraz.cz

Tuchoraz is a municipality and village in Kolín District in the Central Bohemian Region of the Czech Republic. It has about 700 inhabitants.

== Demographics ==
Historical population
Year	Pop.	±%
1869	283	—
1880	280	−1.1%
1890	315	+12.5%
1900	375	+19.0%
1910	377	+0.5%
1921	404	+7.2%
1930	433	+7.2%
1950	335	−22.6%
1961	354	+5.7%
1970	321	−9.3%
1980	335	+4.4%
1991	326	−2.7%
2001	355	+8.9%
2011	444	+25.1%
2021	590	+32.9%
Source: Censuses
