= Drahobudice =

- Municipality
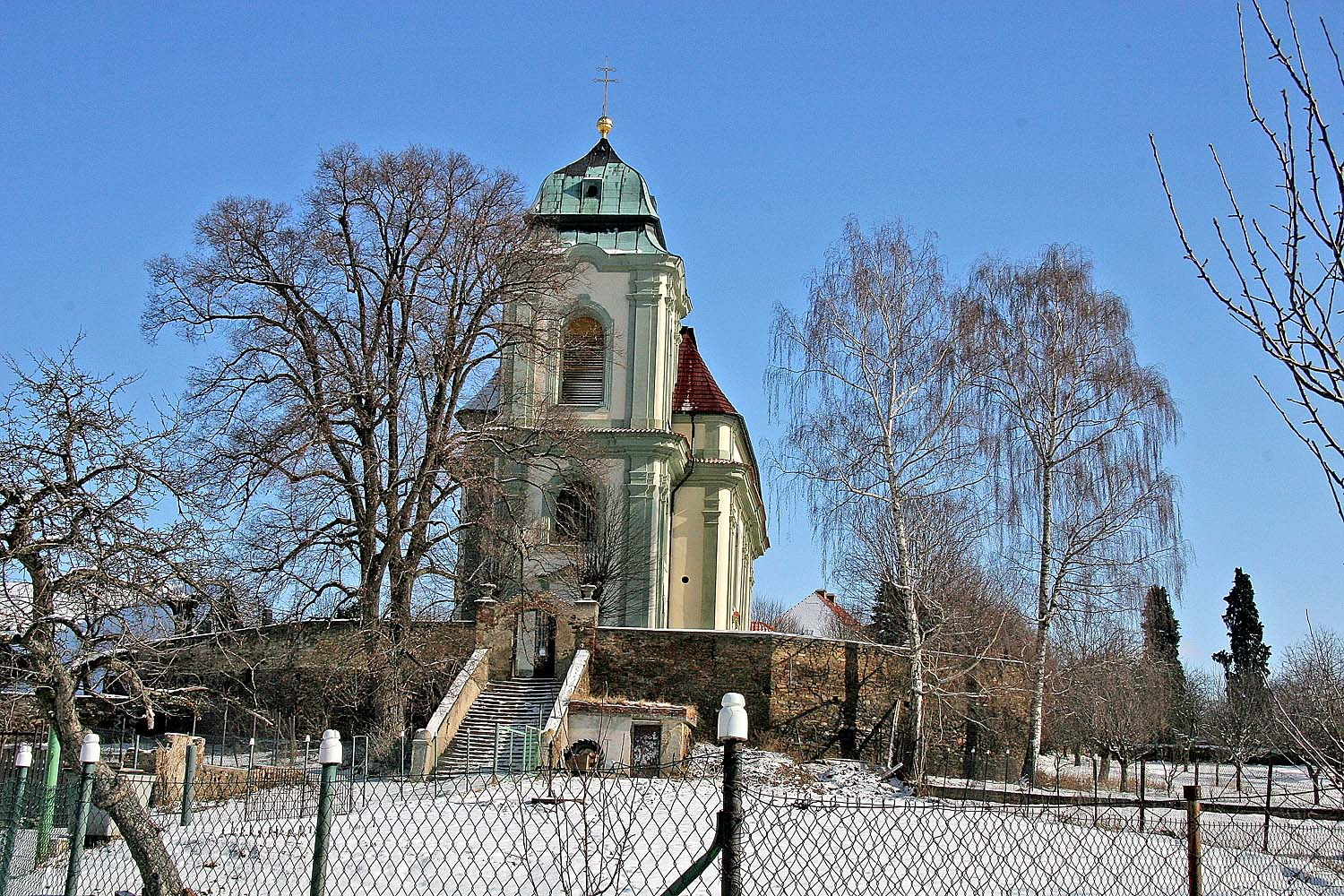
- Church of the Holy Trinity

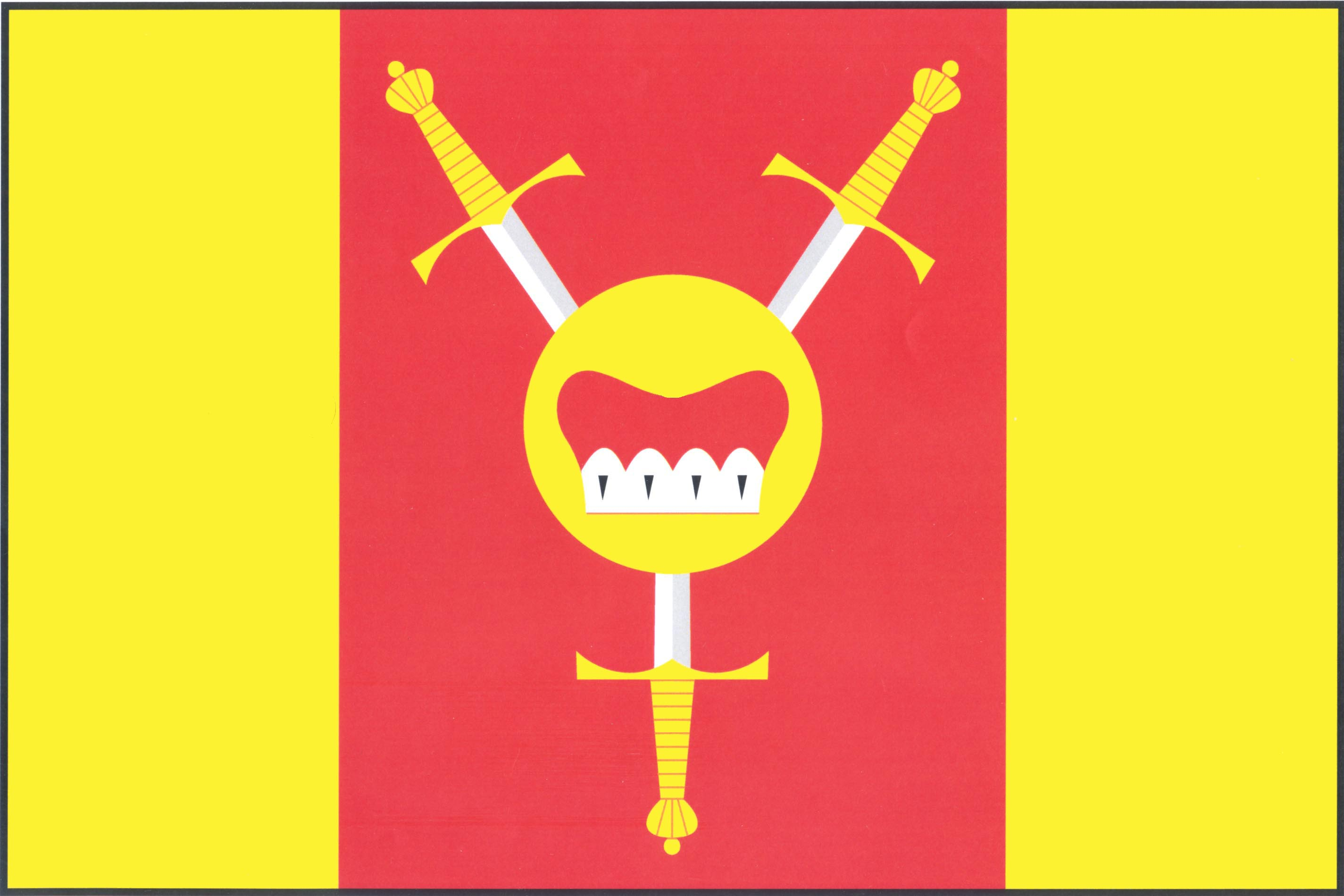
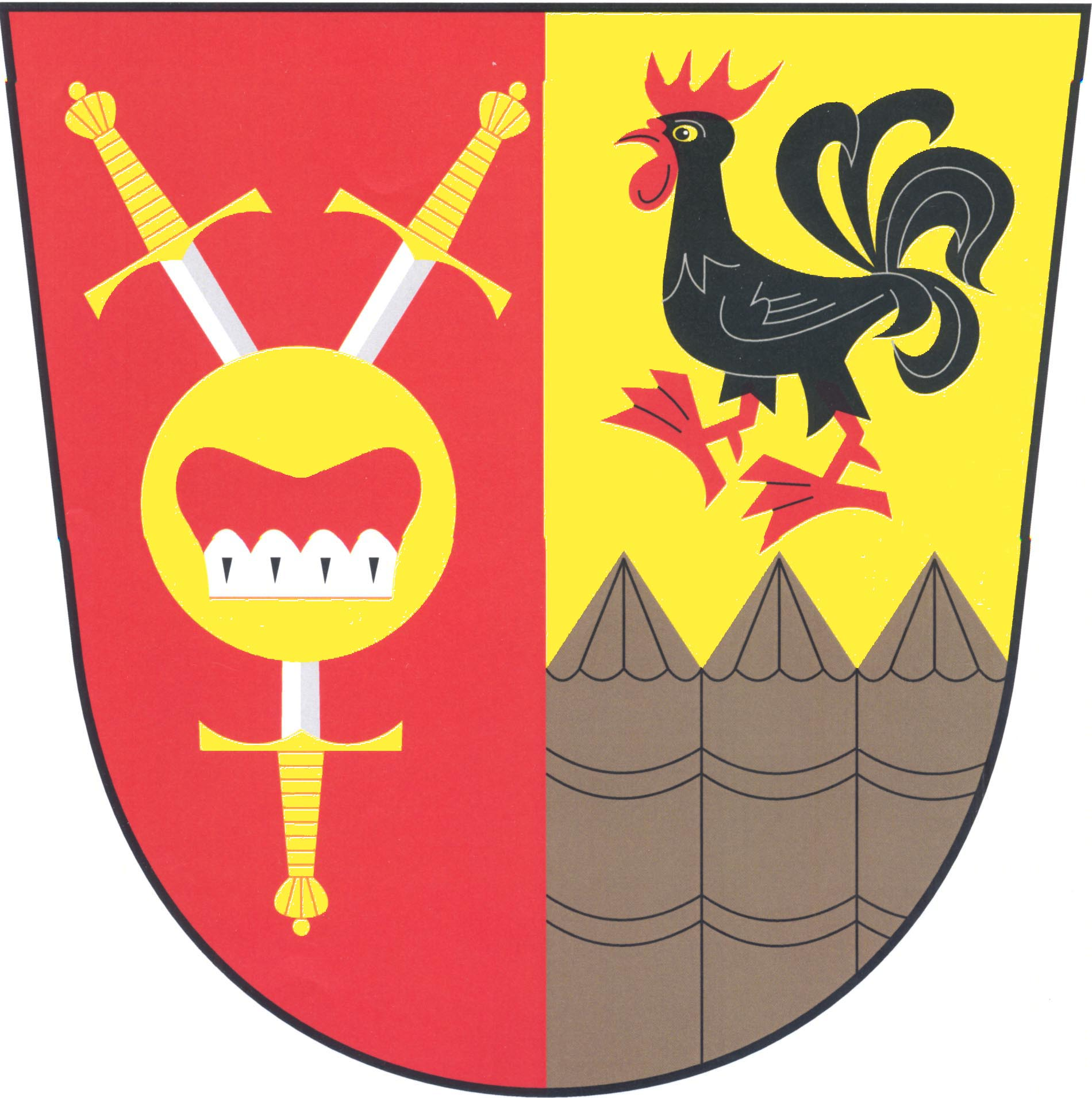
- Flag Coat of arms

- Location in the Czech Republic
- Coordinates: 49°56′15″N 15°3′59″E
- Country: Czech Republic
- Region: Central Bohemian
- District: Kolín
- First mentioned: 1338

Area
  - Total: 5.56 km^{2} (2.15 sq mi)
- Elevation: 339 m (1,112 ft)

Population (2026-01-01)
  - Total: 238
  - Density: 42.8/km^{2} (111/sq mi)
- Time zone: UTC+1 (CET)
  - Summer (DST): UTC+2 (CEST)
- Postal code: 281 44
- Website: www.obec-drahobudice.cz

Drahobudice is a municipality and village in Kolín District in the Central Bohemian Region of the Czech Republic. It has about 200 inhabitants.

== Demographics ==
Historical population
Year	Pop.	±%
1869	530	—
1880	603	+13.8%
1890	570	−5.5%
1900	529	−7.2%
1910	525	−0.8%
1921	487	−7.2%
1930	416	−14.6%
1950	316	−24.0%
1961	288	−8.9%
1970	284	−1.4%
1980	236	−16.9%
1991	220	−6.8%
2001	213	−3.2%
2011	235	+10.3%
2021	248	+5.5%
Source: Censuses
