= Hradešín =

- Municipality
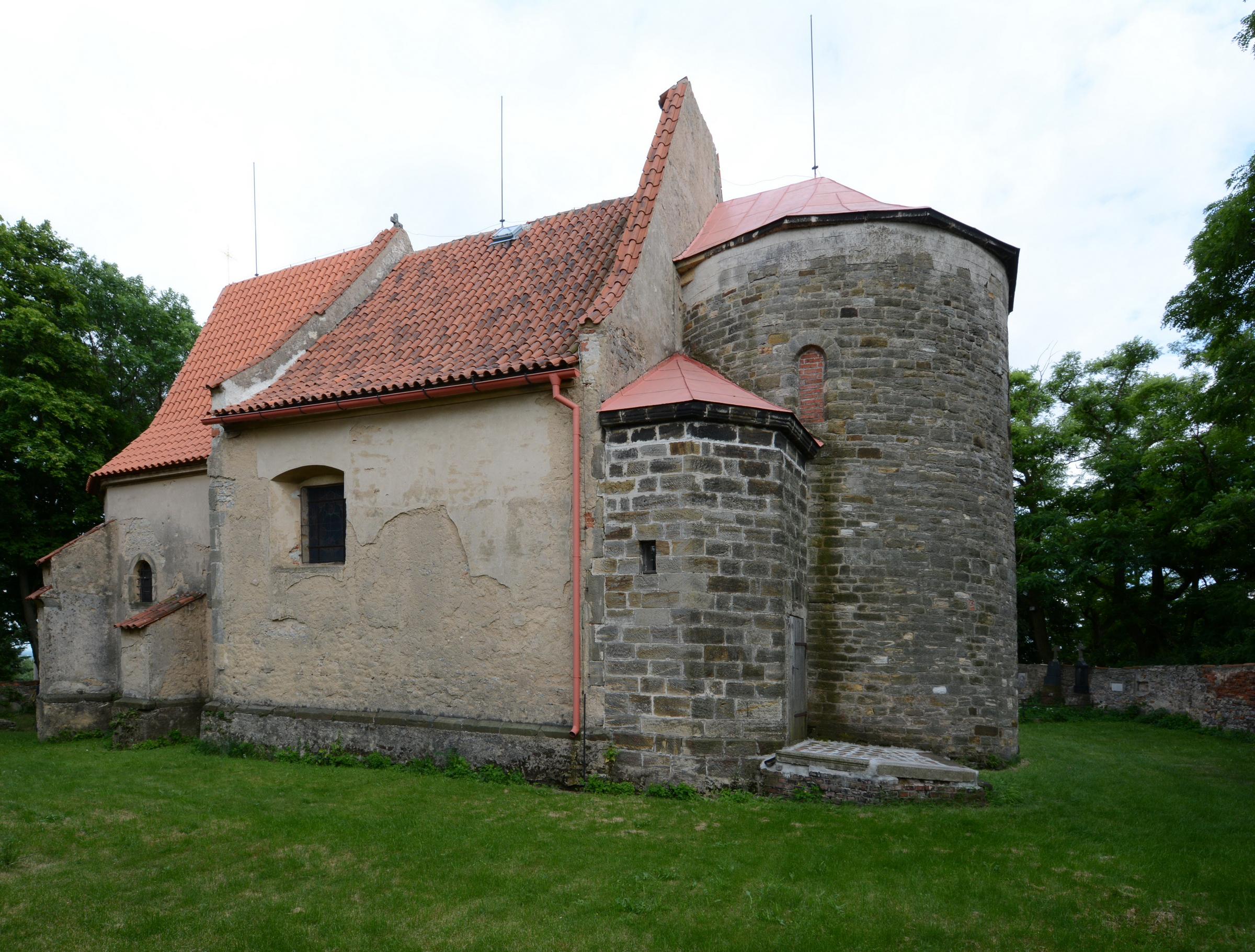
- Church of Saint George

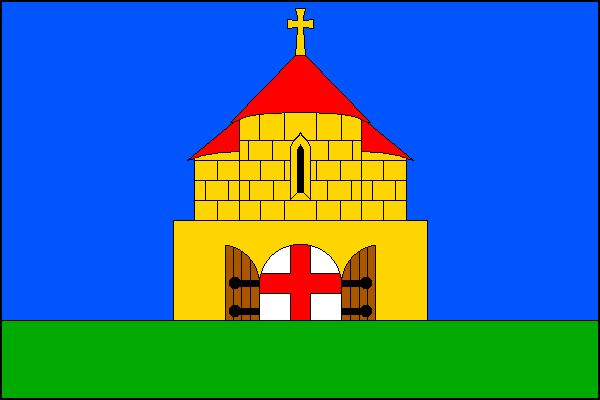
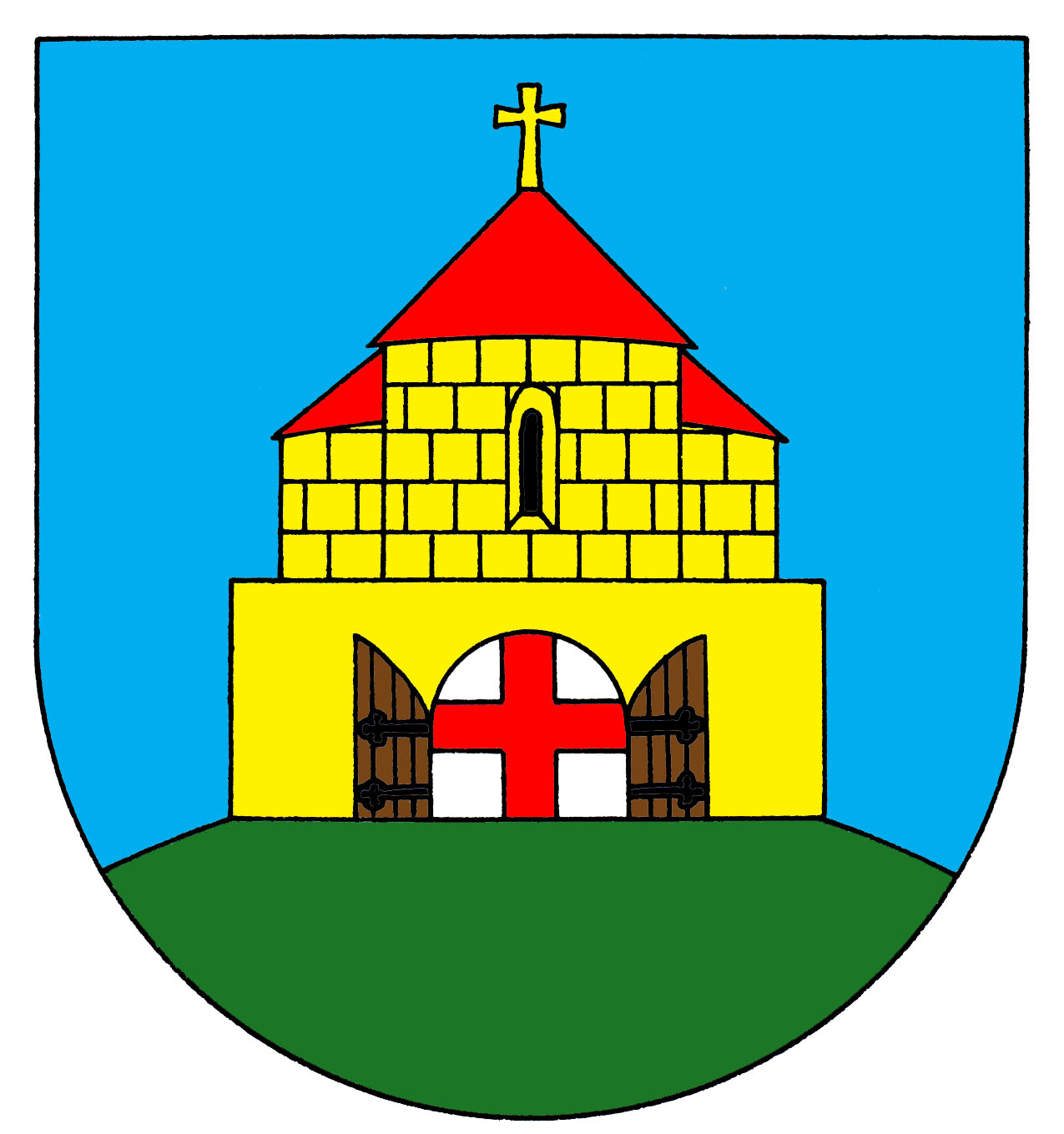
- Flag Coat of arms

- Location in the Czech Republic
- Coordinates: 50°2′20″N 14°45′24″E
- Country: Czech Republic
- Region: Central Bohemian
- District: Kolín
- First mentioned: 1358

Area
  - Total: 4.24 km^{2} (1.64 sq mi)
- Elevation: 398 m (1,306 ft)

Population (2026-01-01)
  - Total: 601
  - Density: 142/km^{2} (367/sq mi)
- Time zone: UTC+1 (CET)
  - Summer (DST): UTC+2 (CEST)
- Postal code: 282 01
- Website: www.hradesin.cz

Hradešín is a municipality and village in Kolín District in the Central Bohemian Region of the Czech Republic. It has about 600 inhabitants.

== Demographics ==
Historical population
Year	Pop.	±%
1869	352	—
1880	364	+3.4%
1890	358	−1.6%
1900	376	+5.0%
1910	401	+6.6%
1921	376	−6.2%
1930	387	+2.9%
1950	267	−31.0%
1961	318	+19.1%
1970	310	−2.5%
1980	242	−21.9%
1991	190	−21.5%
2001	185	−2.6%
2011	334	+80.5%
2021	597	+78.7%
Source: Censuses
