= Kbel (Kolín District) =

- Municipality
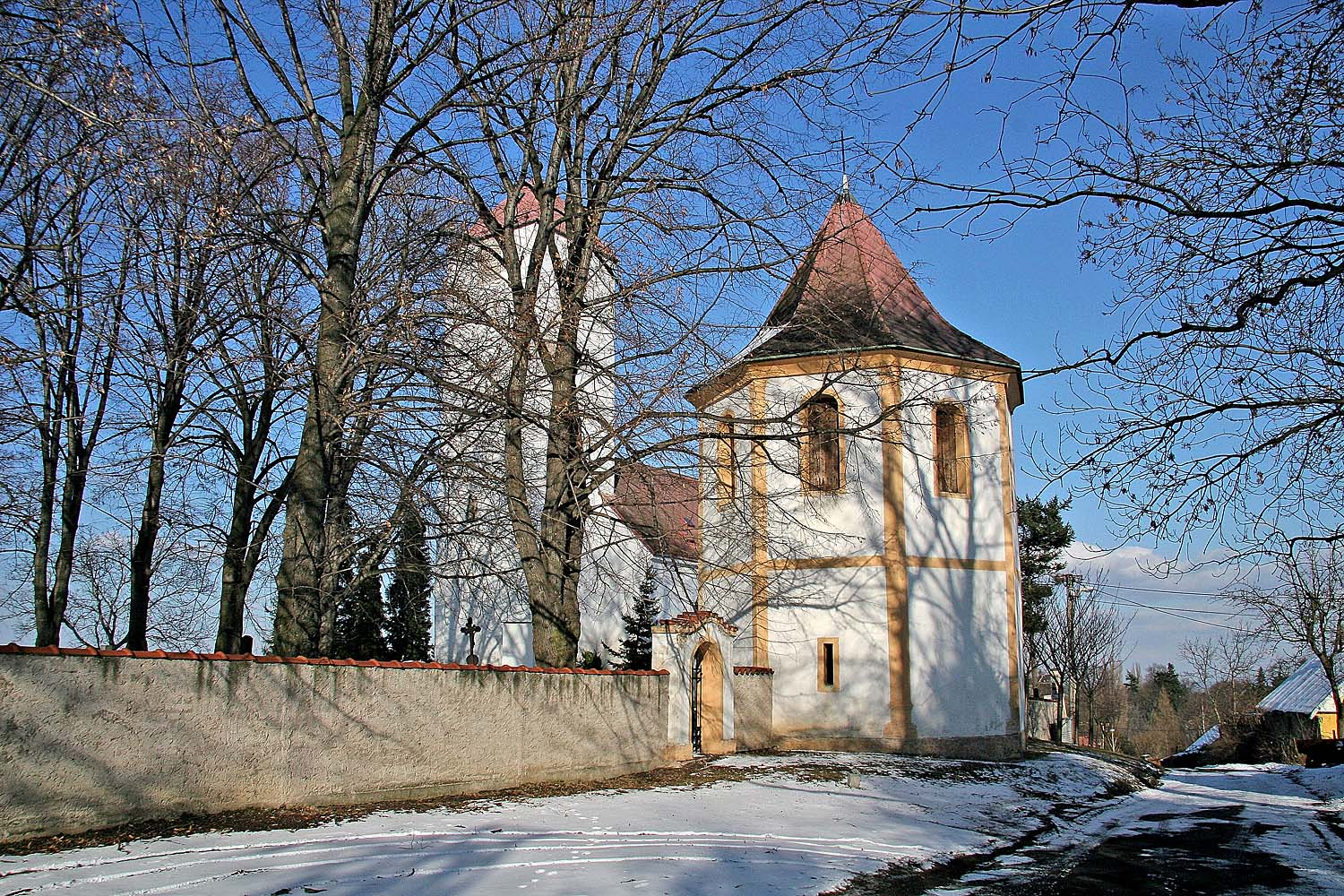
- Church of the Assumption of the Virgin Mary

- Flag Coat of arms

- Location in the Czech Republic
- Coordinates: 49°59′18″N 15°8′37″E
- Country: Czech Republic
- Region: Central Bohemian
- District: Kolín
- First mentioned: 1295

Area
  - Total: 2.02 km^{2} (0.78 sq mi)
- Elevation: 212 m (696 ft)

Population (2026-01-01)
  - Total: 219
  - Density: 108/km^{2} (281/sq mi)
- Time zone: UTC+1 (CET)
  - Summer (DST): UTC+2 (CEST)
- Postal code: 280 02
- Website: www.ou-kbel.cz

Kbel is a municipality and village in Kolín District in the Central Bohemian Region of the Czech Republic. It has about 200 inhabitants.

== Administrative division ==
Kbel consists of two municipal parts (in brackets population according to the 2021 census):

- Kbel (77)
- Kbílek (126)

== Demographics ==
Historical population
Year	Pop.	±%
1869	365	—
1880	406	+11.2%
1890	434	+6.9%
1900	386	−11.1%
1910	377	−2.3%
1921	405	+7.4%
1930	390	−3.7%
1950	312	−20.0%
1961	385	+23.4%
1970	315	−18.2%
1980	282	−10.5%
1991	233	−17.4%
2001	207	−11.2%
2011	208	+0.5%
2021	203	−2.4%
Source: Censuses
