= Polní Chrčice =

- Municipality
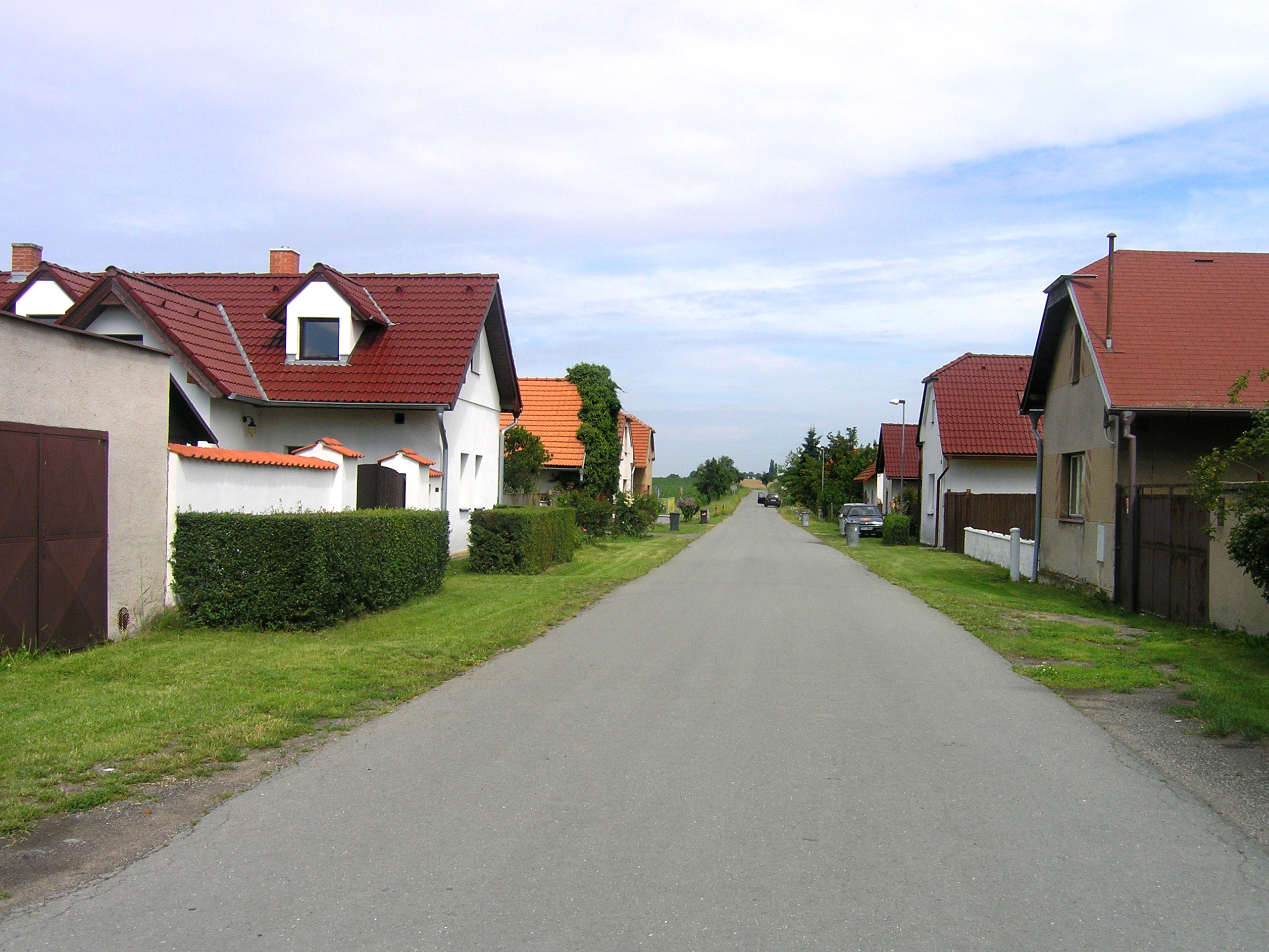
- Northern part of Polní Chrčice

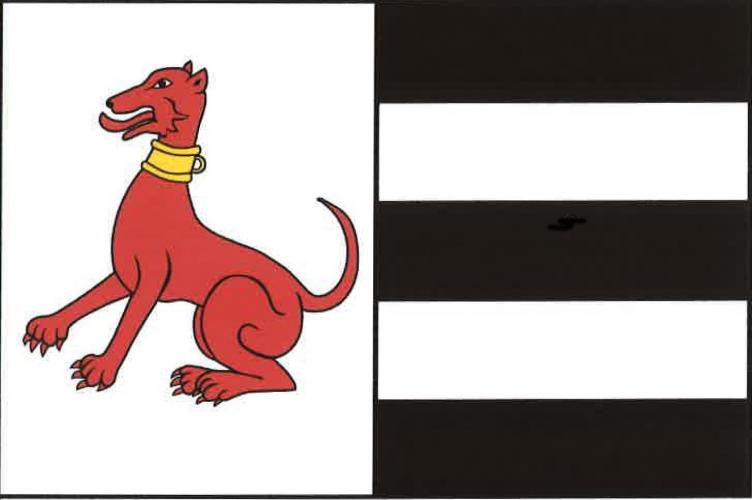
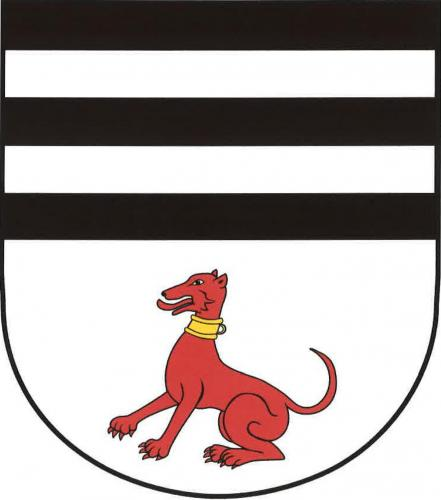
- Flag Coat of arms

- Location in the Czech Republic
- Coordinates: 50°6′36″N 15°17′48″E
- Country: Czech Republic
- Region: Central Bohemian
- District: Kolín
- First mentioned: 1361

Area
  - Total: 5.26 km^{2} (2.03 sq mi)
- Elevation: 223 m (732 ft)

Population (2026-01-01)
  - Total: 183
  - Density: 34.8/km^{2} (90.1/sq mi)
- Time zone: UTC+1 (CET)
  - Summer (DST): UTC+2 (CEST)
- Postal code: 280 02
- Website: www.polnichrcice.cz

Polní Chrčice is a municipality and village in Kolín District in the Central Bohemian Region of the Czech Republic. It has about 200 inhabitants.

== Demographics ==
Historical population
Year	Pop.	±%
1869	331	—
1880	331	+0.0%
1890	371	+12.1%
1900	364	−1.9%
1910	350	−3.8%
1921	366	+4.6%
1930	345	−5.7%
1950	269	−22.0%
1961	259	−3.7%
1970	235	−9.3%
1980	209	−11.1%
1991	150	−28.2%
2001	144	−4.0%
2011	151	+4.9%
2021	193	+27.8%
Source: Censuses
