= Kolín District =

Kolín District Okres Kolín
- District
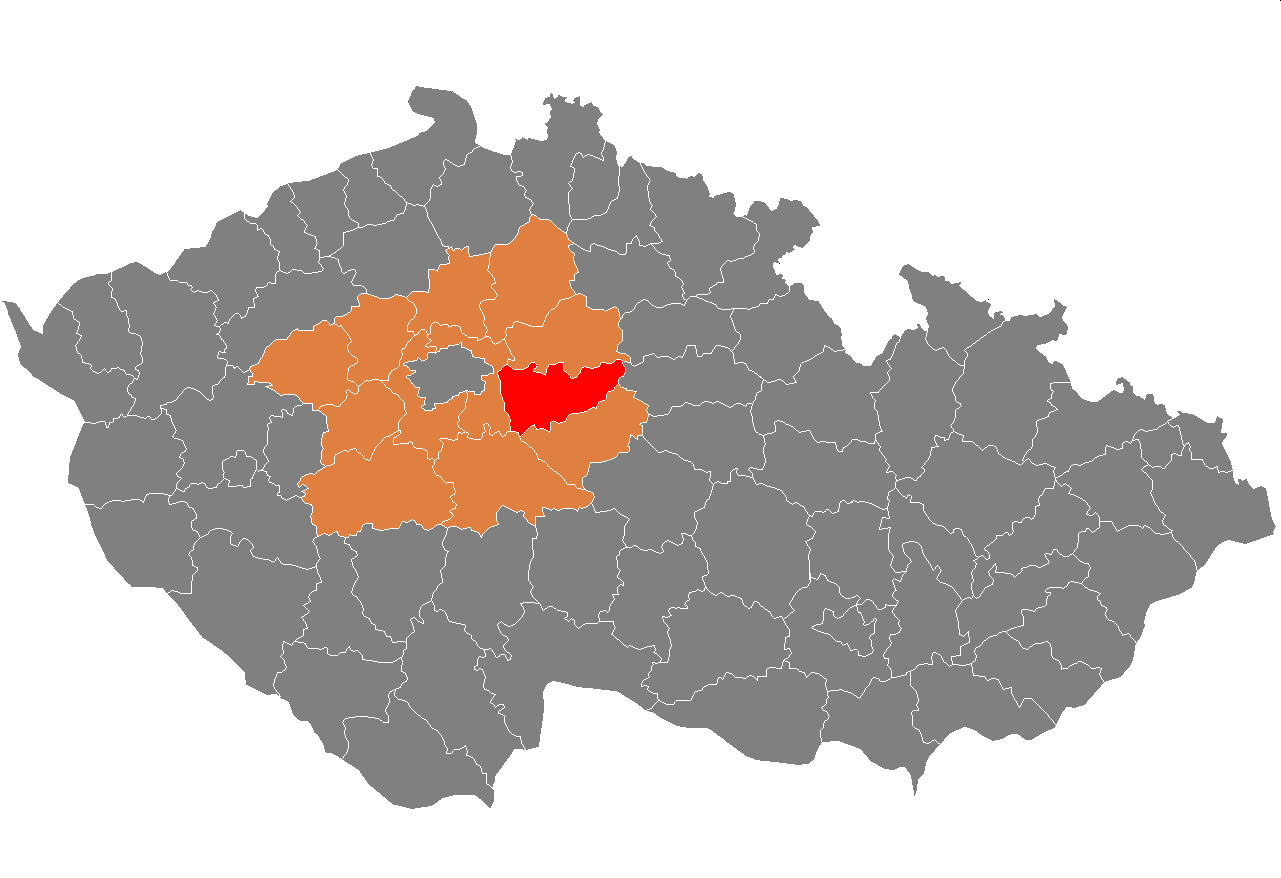
- Location in the Central Bohemian Region within the Czech Republic
- Coordinates: 50°2′N 15°6′E
- Country: Czech Republic
- Region: Central Bohemian
- Capital: Kolín

Area
  - Total: 747.61 km^{2} (288.65 sq mi)

Population (2026)
  - Total: 108,760
  - Density: 145.48/km^{2} (376.78/sq mi)
- Time zone: UTC+1 (CET)
  - Summer (DST): UTC+2 (CEST)
- Municipalities: 90
- * Towns: 6
- * Market towns: 3

Kolín District (Czech: okres Kolín) is a district in the Central Bohemian Region of the Czech Republic. Its capital is the town of Kolín.

== Administrative division ==
Kolín District is divided into two administrative districts of municipalities with extended competence: Kolín and Český Brod.

=== List of municipalities ===
Towns are marked in bold and market towns in italics:

Barchovice - Bečváry - Bělušice - Břežany I - Břežany II - Býchory - Cerhenice - Černíky - Červené Pečky - Český Brod - Chotutice - Choťovice - Chrášťany - Církvice - Dobřichov - Dolní Chvatliny - Dománovice - Doubravčice - Drahobudice - Grunta - Horní Kruty - Hradešín - Jestřabí Lhota - Kbel - Klášterní Skalice - Klučov - Kolín - Konárovice - Kořenice - Kouřim - Krakovany - Křečhoř - Krupá - Krychnov - Kšely - Libenice - Libodřice - Lipec - Lošany - Malotice - Masojedy - Mrzky - Nebovidy - Němčice - Nová Ves I - Ohaře - Ovčáry - Pašinka - Pečky - Plaňany - Pňov-Předhradí - Polepy - Polní Chrčice - Polní Voděrady - Poříčany - Přehvozdí - Přistoupim - Přišimasy - Radim - Radovesnice I - Radovesnice II - Ratboř - Ratenice - Rostoklaty - Skvrňov - Starý Kolín - Svojšice - Tatce - Tismice - Toušice - Třebovle - Tři Dvory - Tuchoraz - Tuklaty - Týnec nad Labem - Uhlířská Lhota - Veletov - Velim - Velký Osek - Veltruby - Vitice - Volárna - Vrátkov - Vrbčany - Žabonosy - Zalešany - Zásmuky - Ždánice - Žehuň - Žiželice

== Geography ==
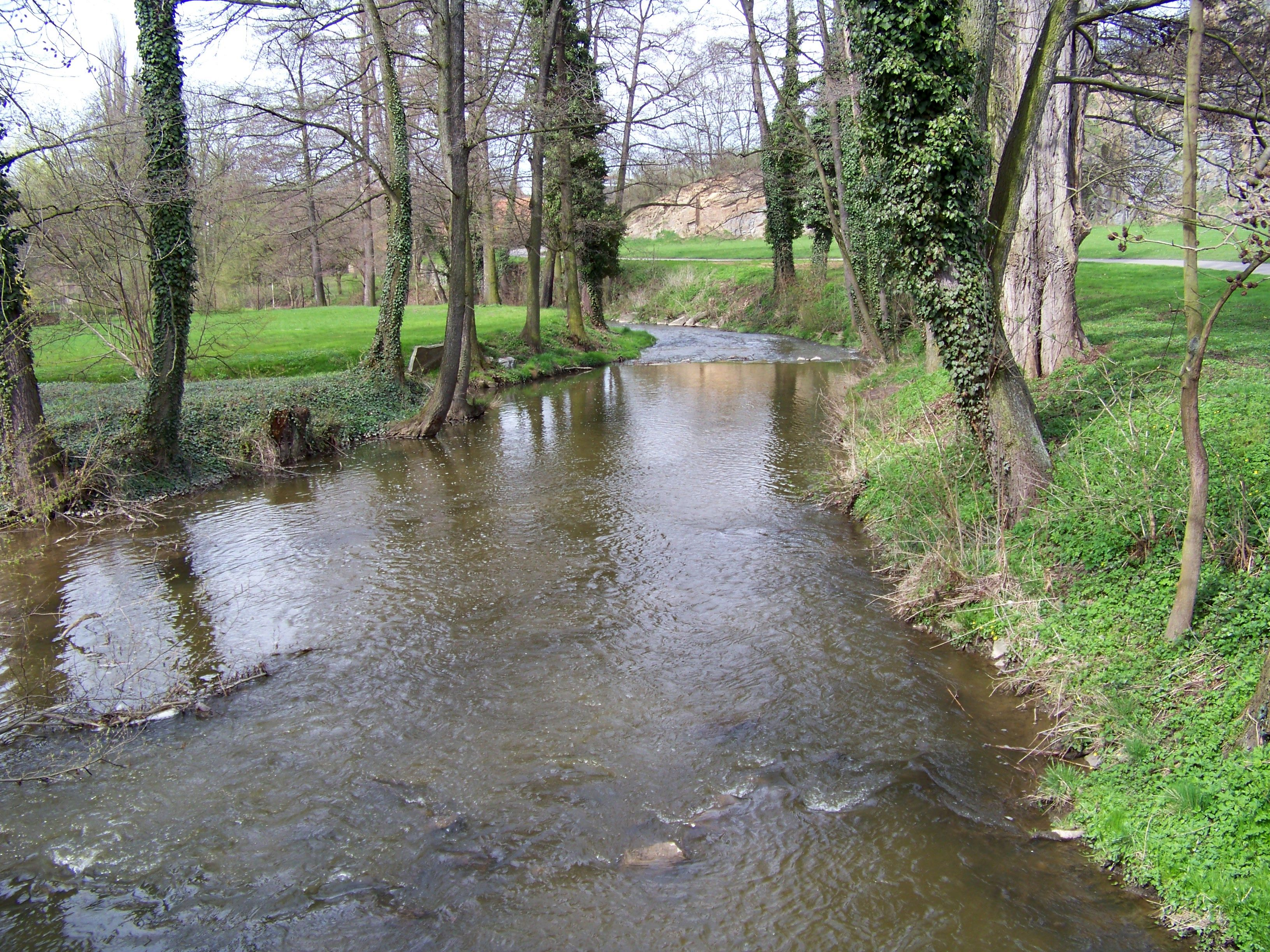
The Výrovka River in Kouřim

The district is located in an agricultural and deforested landscape, which is mostly flat and belongs to the Polabí region. The territory extends into three geomorphological mesoregions: Central Elbe Table (most of the territory), Upper Sázava Hills (southeastern part) and East Elbe Table (small northeastern part). The highest point of the district is the hill Kamenný vrch in Barchovice with an elevation of 456 m (1,496 ft), the lowest point is the river basin of the Elbe in Pňov-Předhradí at 188 m (617 ft).

From the total district area of 747.6 km^{2} (288.6 sq mi), agricultural land occupies 552.3 km^{2} (213.2 sq mi), forests occupy 94.9 km^{2} (36.6 sq mi), and water area occupies 17.3 km^{2} (6.7 sq mi). Forests cover 12.7% of the district's area.

The most important river is the Elbe, however, the longest river within the territory is the Výrovka. A short section of the Klejnárka River before its confluence with the Elbe is also located in the district.

There are no large-scale protected areas.

== Demographics ==
Historical population

| Year | Pop. | ±% |
|---|---|---|
| 1869 | 81,499 | — |
| 1880 | 92,599 | +13.6% |
| 1890 | 98,444 | +6.3% |
| 1900 | 101,954 | +3.6% |
| 1910 | 106,284 | +4.2% |

| Year | Pop. | ±% |
|---|---|---|
| 1921 | 104,505 | −1.7% |
| 1930 | 108,612 | +3.9% |
| 1950 | 96,404 | −11.2% |
| 1961 | 99,159 | +2.9% |
| 1970 | 97,235 | −1.9% |

| Year | Pop. | ±% |
|---|---|---|
| 1980 | 97,383 | +0.2% |
| 1991 | 91,762 | −5.8% |
| 2001 | 89,475 | −2.5% |
| 2011 | 96,117 | +7.4% |
| 2021 | 104,227 | +8.4% |

Source: Censuses (Note: Including Černíky, which was part of Nymburk District until 2020.)

=== Most populous municipalities ===
| Name | Population | Area (km^{2}) |
|---|---|---|
| Kolín | 33,392 | 35 |
| Český Brod | 7,355 | 20 |
| Pečky | 4,951 | 11 |
| Velký Osek | 2,666 | 11 |
| Velim | 2,215 | 16 |
| Zásmuky | 2,182 | 24 |
| Týnec nad Labem | 2,173 | 16 |
| Červené Pečky | 2,098 | 16 |
| Žiželice | 2,002 | 19 |
| Kouřim | 1,981 | 14 |

== Economy ==
The largest employers with headquarters in Kolín District and at least 500 employees are:

| Economic entity | Location | Number of employees | Main activity |
|---|---|---|---|
| Toyota Motor Manufacturing Czech Republic | Kolín | 3,000–3,999 | Automobile manufacture |
| Regional Hospital Kolín | Kolín | 2,000–2,499 | Health care |

== Transport ==
The D11 motorway from Prague to Hradec Králové passes through the northern part of the district.

== Sights ==
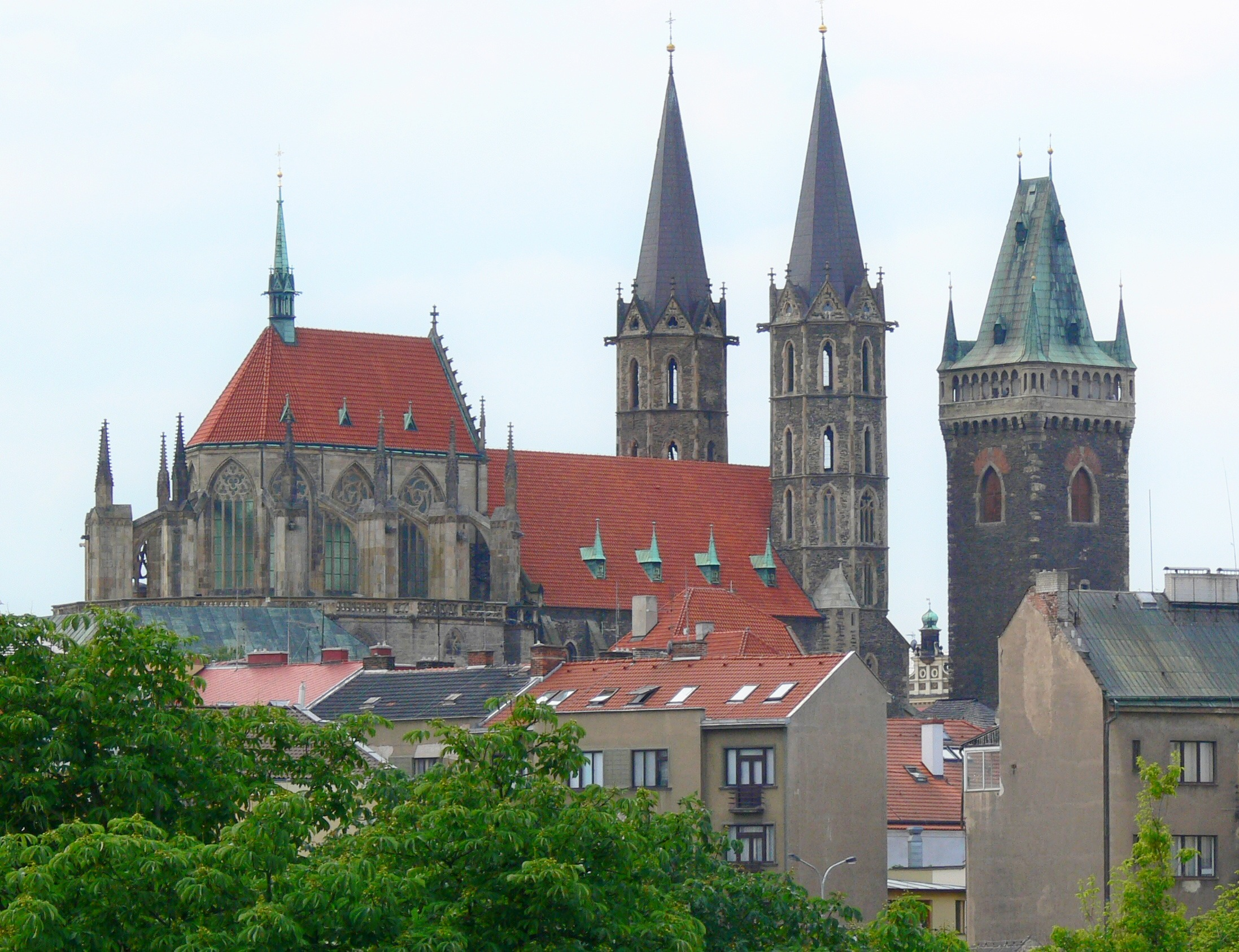
Church of Saint Bartholomew in Kolín

The most important monuments in the district, protected as national cultural monuments, are:

- Church of Saint Bartholomew in Kolín
- Town fortifications in Kouřim

The best-preserved settlements and archaeological sites, protected as monument reservations and monument zones, are:

- Kolín (monument reservation)
- Tumuli near Libodřice (monument reservation)
- Český Brod
- Kouřim
- Týnec nad Labem

The most visited tourist destination is the Regional Museum in Kolín.
