= Veletov =

- Municipality
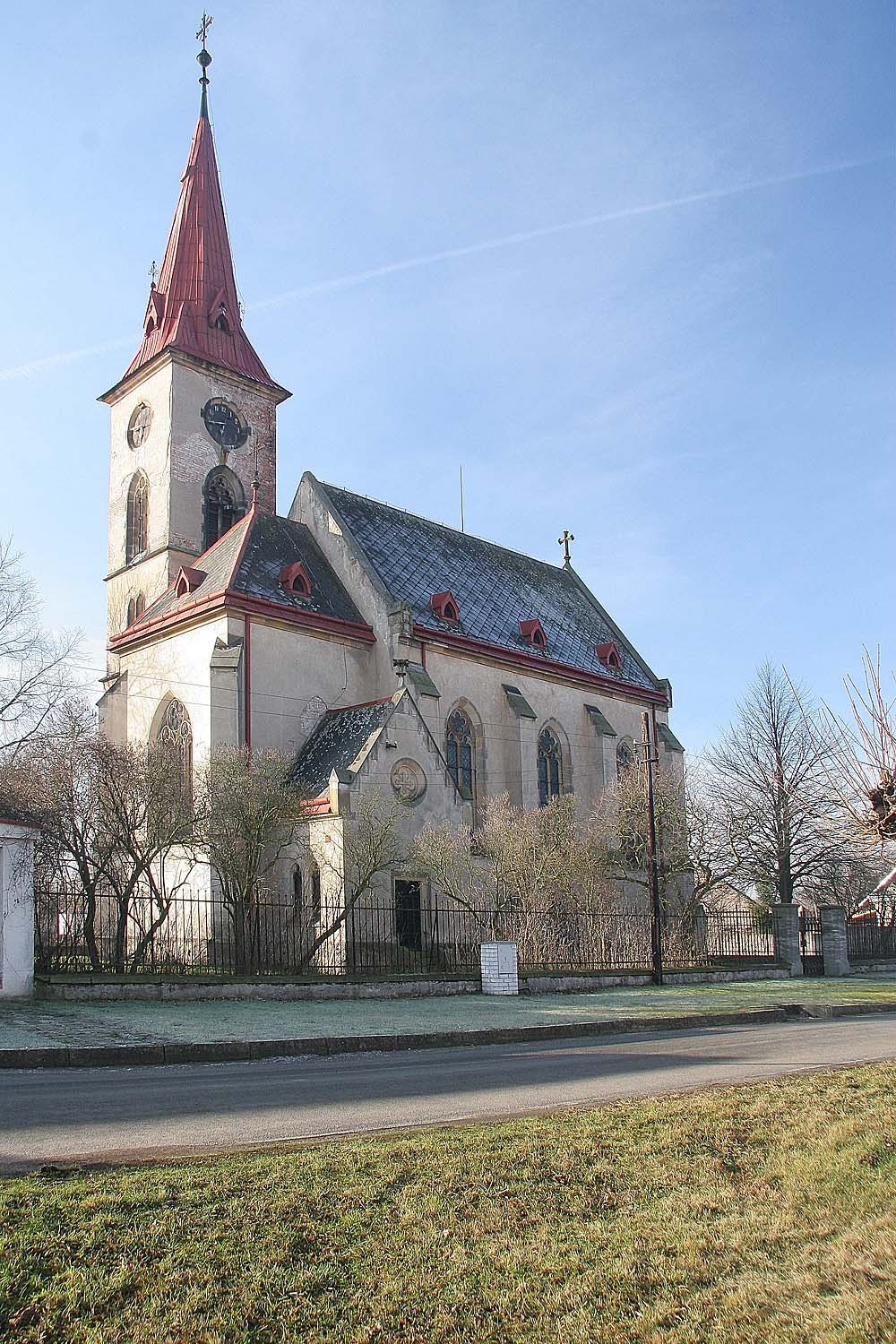
- Church of the Annunciation

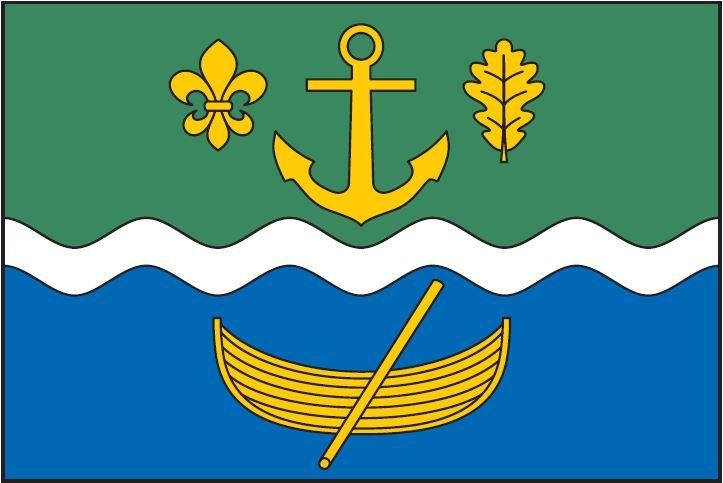
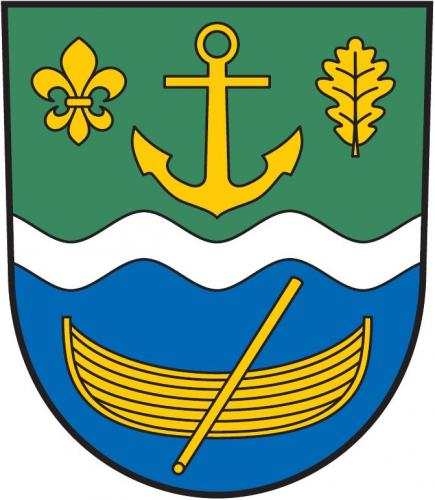
- Flag Coat of arms

- Location in the Czech Republic
- Coordinates: 50°1′42″N 15°18′19″E
- Country: Czech Republic
- Region: Central Bohemian
- District: Kolín
- First mentioned: 1306

Area
  - Total: 5.28 km^{2} (2.04 sq mi)
- Elevation: 198 m (650 ft)

Population (2026-01-01)
  - Total: 262
  - Density: 49.6/km^{2} (129/sq mi)
- Time zone: UTC+1 (CET)
  - Summer (DST): UTC+2 (CEST)
- Postal code: 280 02
- Website: www.veletov.cz

Veletov is a municipality and village in Kolín District in the Central Bohemian Region of the Czech Republic. It has about 300 inhabitants.

== Demographics ==
Historical population
Year	Pop.	±%
1869	380	—
1880	397	+4.5%
1890	403	+1.5%
1900	379	−6.0%
1910	400	+5.5%
1921	382	−4.5%
1930	334	−12.6%
1950	313	−6.3%
1961	285	−8.9%
1970	247	−13.3%
1980	233	−5.7%
1991	204	−12.4%
2001	223	+9.3%
2011	243	+9.0%
2021	239	−1.6%
Source: Censuses
