= Masojedy =

- Municipality
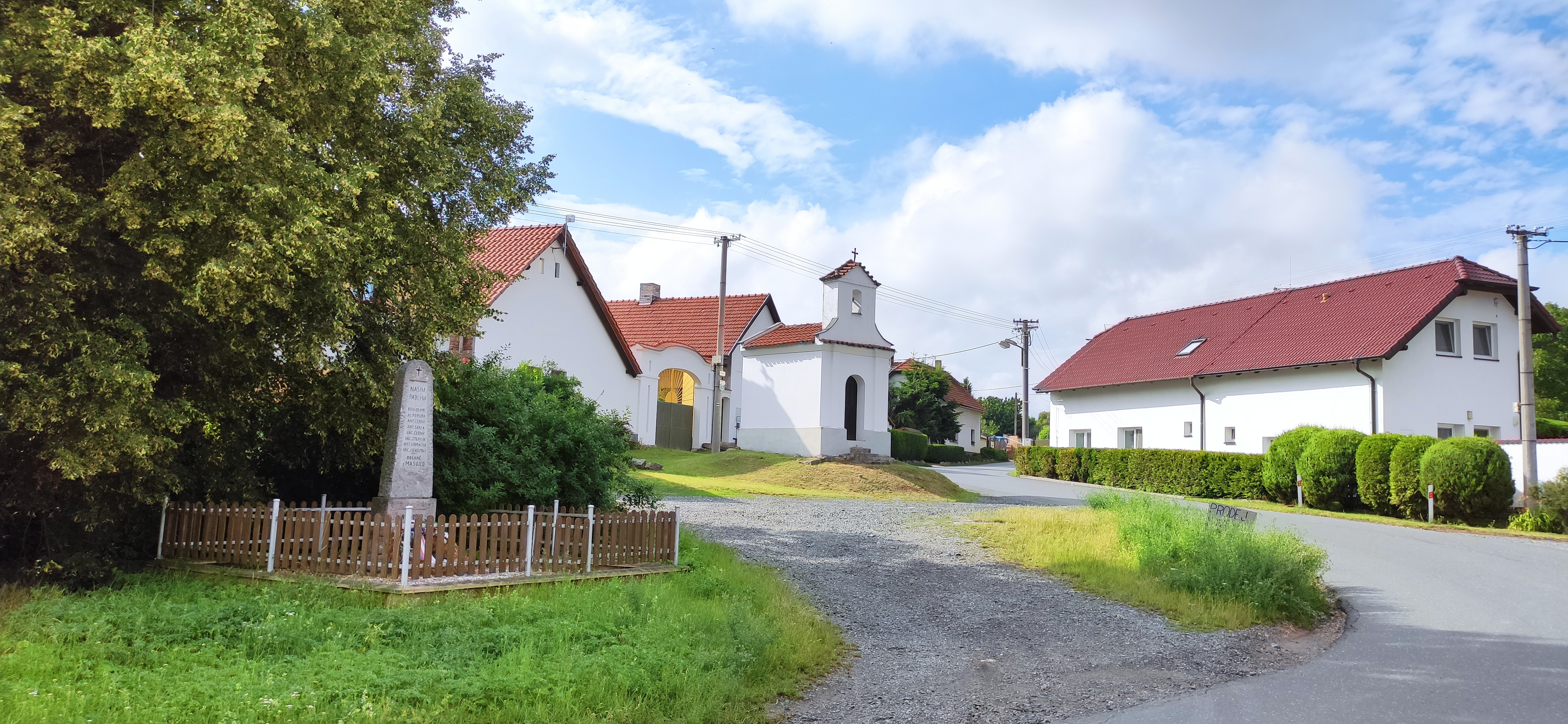
- Centre of Masojedy

- Location in the Czech Republic
- Coordinates: 50°1′34″N 14°46′41″E
- Country: Czech Republic
- Region: Central Bohemian
- District: Kolín
- First mentioned: 1342

Area
  - Total: 1.80 km^{2} (0.69 sq mi)
- Elevation: 354 m (1,161 ft)

Population (2026-01-01)
  - Total: 120
  - Density: 67/km^{2} (170/sq mi)
- Time zone: UTC+1 (CET)
  - Summer (DST): UTC+2 (CEST)
- Postal code: 282 01
- Website: www.masojedy.cz

Masojedy is a municipality and village in Kolín District in the Central Bohemian Region of the Czech Republic. It has about 100 inhabitants.

== Demographics ==
Historical population
Year	Pop.	±%
1869	233	—
1880	233	+0.0%
1890	254	+9.0%
1900	248	−2.4%
1910	225	−9.3%
1921	224	−0.4%
1930	173	−22.8%
1950	154	−11.0%
1961	154	+0.0%
1970	124	−19.5%
1980	99	−20.2%
1991	57	−42.4%
2001	57	+0.0%
2011	91	+59.6%
2021	112	+23.1%
Source: Censuses
