= Lipec, Vinica =

Lipec Липец
- Village
- Location within North Macedonia
- Coordinates: 41.841797°N 22.552192°E
- Country: North Macedonia
- Region: Eastern
- Municipality: Vinica

Population (2002)
  - Total: 430
- Time zone: UTC+1 (CET)
  - Summer (DST): UTC+2 (CEST)
- Website: .

Lipec (Macedonian: Липец) is a village in the municipality of Vinica, North Macedonia. It used to be part of the former municipality of Blatec.

== Demographics ==
According to the 2002 census, the village had a total of 430 inhabitants. Ethnic groups in the village include:

- Macedonians 429
- Serbs 1
