= Bělušice (Kolín District) =

- Municipality
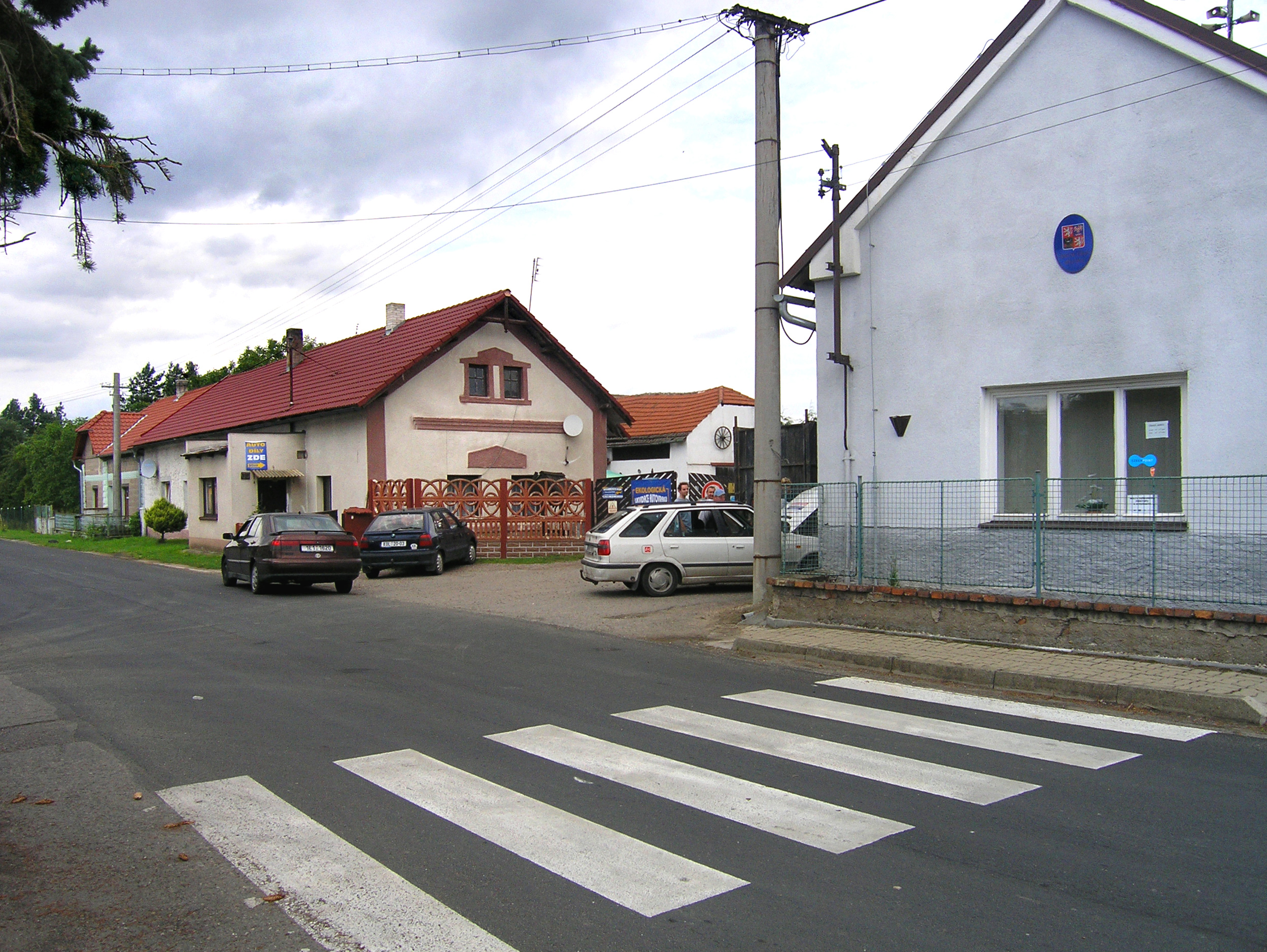
- Municipal office

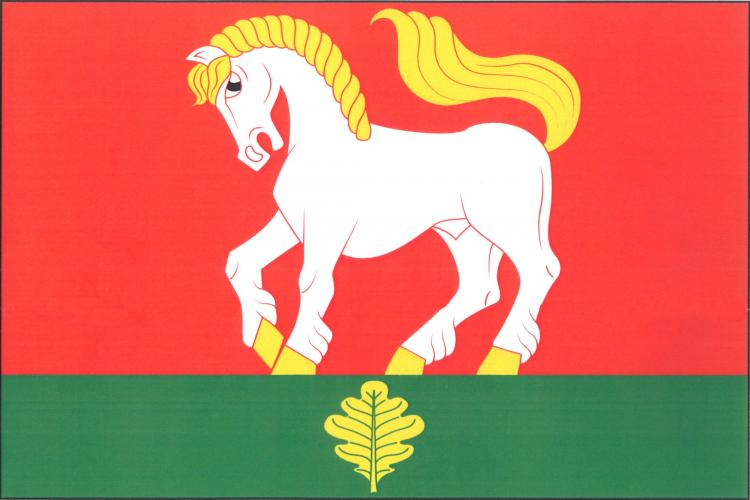
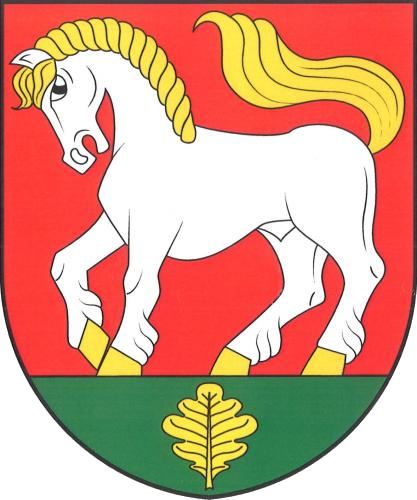
- Flag Coat of arms

- Location in the Czech Republic
- Coordinates: 50°4′9″N 15°19′19″E
- Country: Czech Republic
- Region: Central Bohemian
- District: Kolín
- First mentioned: 1356

Area
  - Total: 2.55 km^{2} (0.98 sq mi)
- Elevation: 236 m (774 ft)

Population (2026-01-01)
  - Total: 306
  - Density: 120/km^{2} (311/sq mi)
- Time zone: UTC+1 (CET)
  - Summer (DST): UTC+2 (CEST)
- Postal code: 280 02
- Website: obecbelusice.cz

Bělušice is a municipality and village in Kolín District in the Central Bohemian Region of the Czech Republic. It has about 300 inhabitants.

== Demographics ==
Historical population
Year	Pop.	±%
1869	–	—
1880	425	—
1890	450	+5.9%
1900	450	+0.0%
1910	466	+3.6%
1921	454	−2.6%
1930	445	−2.0%
1950	381	−14.4%
1961	338	−11.3%
1970	311	−8.0%
1980	271	−12.9%
1991	244	−10.0%
2001	238	−2.5%
2011	269	+13.0%
2021	309	+14.9%
Source: Censuses
