= Lipec (Kolín District) =

- Municipality
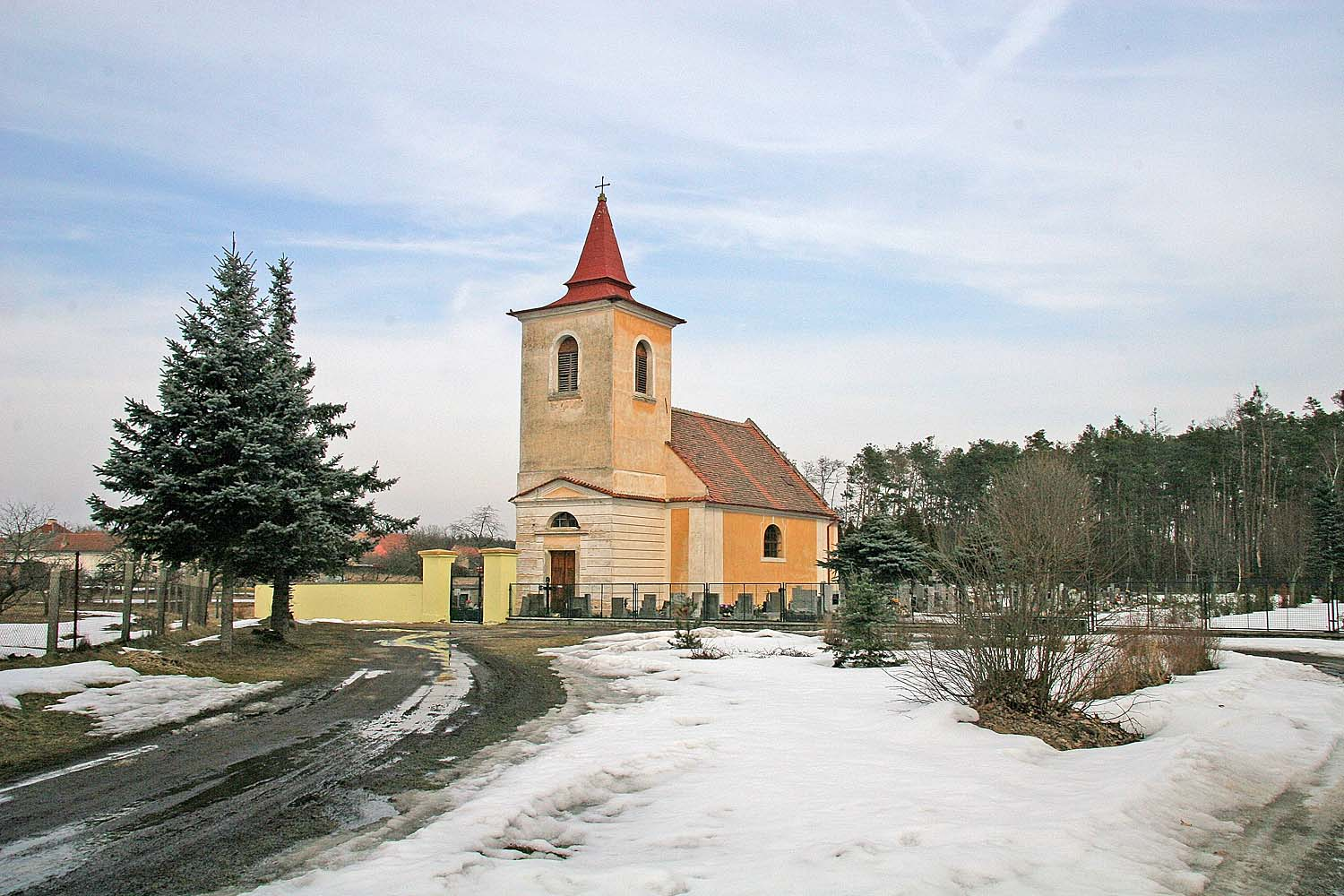
- Church of the Holy Trinity

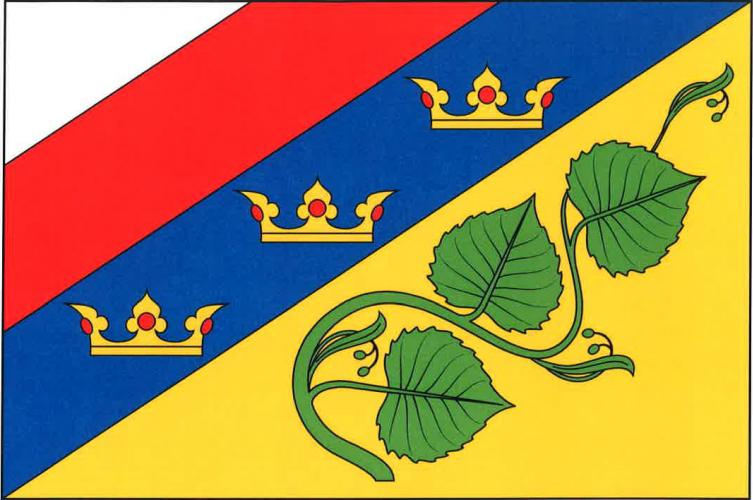
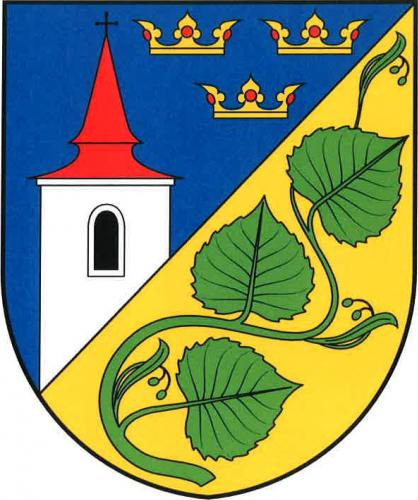
- Flag Coat of arms

- Location in the Czech Republic
- Coordinates: 50°5′6″N 15°21′53″E
- Country: Czech Republic
- Region: Central Bohemian
- District: Kolín
- First mentioned: 1409

Area
  - Total: 3.89 km^{2} (1.50 sq mi)
- Elevation: 245 m (804 ft)

Population (2026-01-01)
  - Total: 184
  - Density: 47.3/km^{2} (123/sq mi)
- Time zone: UTC+1 (CET)
  - Summer (DST): UTC+2 (CEST)
- Postal code: 281 26
- Website: www.lipec.cz

Lipec is a municipality and village in Kolín District in the Central Bohemian Region of the Czech Republic. It has about 200 inhabitants.

== Demographics ==
Historical population
Year	Pop.	±%
1869	244	—
1880	269	+10.2%
1890	237	−11.9%
1900	279	+17.7%
1910	301	+7.9%
1921	292	−3.0%
1930	275	−5.8%
1950	250	−9.1%
1961	255	+2.0%
1970	235	−7.8%
1980	218	−7.2%
1991	202	−7.3%
2001	199	−1.5%
2011	194	−2.5%
2021	182	−6.2%
Source: Censuses
