= Kunovice (disambiguation) =

Kunovice is a town in the Zlín Region of the Czech Republic.

Kunovice may also refer to:

- Kunovice Airport, Zlín Region, Czech Republic
- Let Kunovice, a Czech aircraft manufacturer
- Kunovice (Vsetín District), a municipality and village in the Zlín Region, Czech Republic
- Kuňovice, a municipality and village in the Central Bohemian Region, Czech Republic
