= Benešov District =

Benešov District Okres Benešov
- District
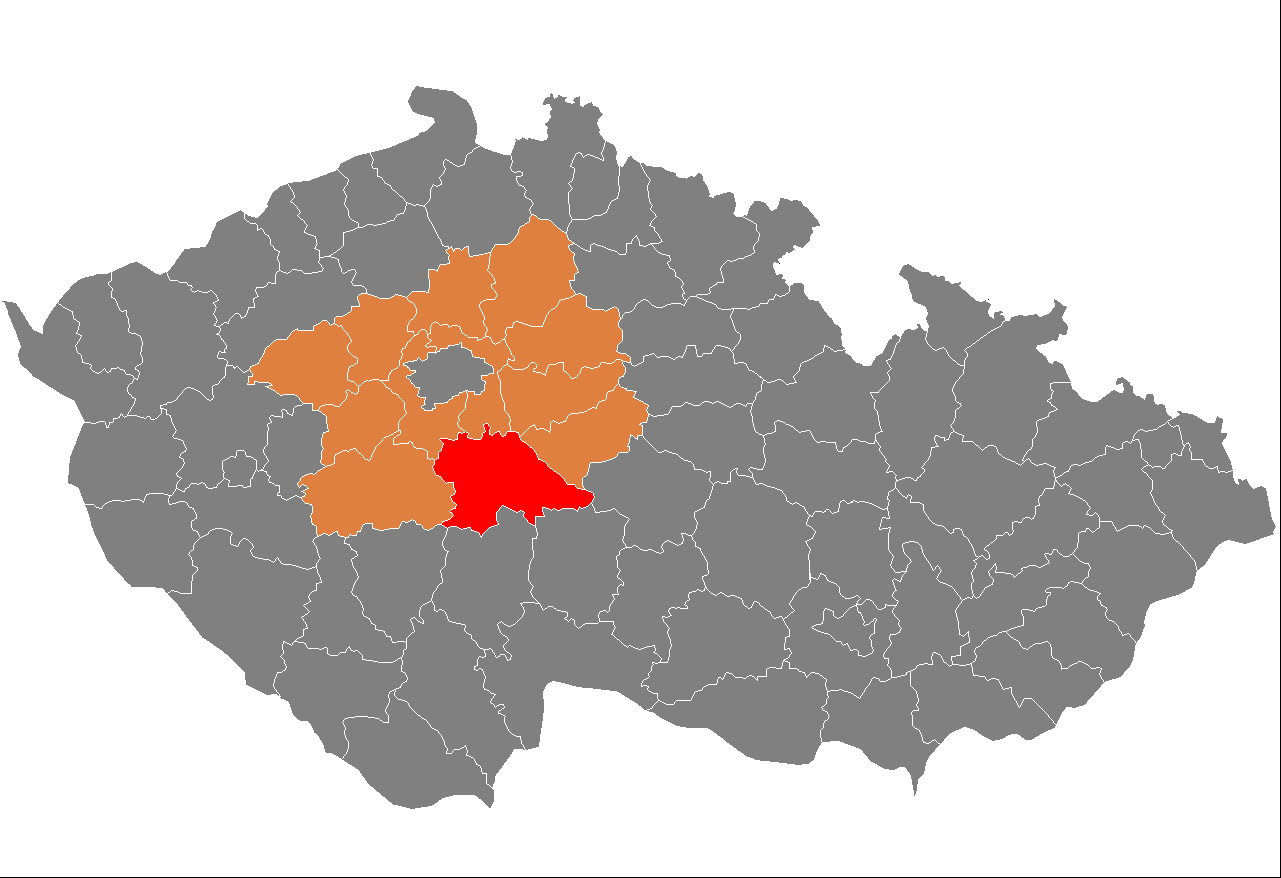
- Location in the Central Bohemian Region within the Czech Republic
- Coordinates: 49°44′N 14°45′E
- Country: Czech Republic
- Region: Central Bohemian
- Capital: Benešov

Area
  - Total: 1,474.91 km^{2} (569.47 sq mi)

Population (2026)
  - Total: 104,433
  - Density: 70.8064/km^{2} (183.388/sq mi)
- Time zone: UTC+1 (CET)
  - Summer (DST): UTC+2 (CEST)
- Municipalities: 114
- * Towns: 10
- * Market towns: 11

Benešov District (Czech: okres Benešov) is a district in the Central Bohemian Region of the Czech Republic. Its capital is the town of Benešov.

== Administrative division ==
Benešov District is divided into three administrative districts of municipalities with extended competence: Benešov, Vlašim and Votice.

=== List of municipalities ===
Towns are marked in bold and market towns in italics:

Benešov – Bernartice – Bílkovice – Blažejovice – Borovnice – Bukovany – Bystřice – Čakov – Čechtice – Čerčany – Červený Újezd – Český Šternberk – Chářovice – Chleby – Chlístov – Chlum – Chmelná – Chocerady – Choratice – Chotýšany – Chrášťany – Ctiboř – Čtyřkoly – Děkanovice – Divišov – Dolní Kralovice – Drahňovice – Dunice – Heřmaničky – Hradiště – Hulice – Hvězdonice – Jankov – Javorník – Ješetice – Jinošice – Kamberk – Keblov – Kladruby – Kondrac – Kozmice – Křečovice – Krhanice – Křivsoudov – Krňany – Kuňovice – Lešany – Libež – Litichovice – Loket – Louňovice pod Blaníkem – Lštění – Maršovice – Mezno – Miličín – Miřetice – Mnichovice – Mrač – Načeradec – Nespeky – Netvořice – Neustupov – Neveklov – Olbramovice – Ostrov – Ostředek – Pavlovice – Petroupim – Popovice – Poříčí nad Sázavou – Postupice – Pravonín – Přestavlky u Čerčan – Psáře – Pyšely – Rabyně – Radošovice – Rataje – Ratměřice – Řehenice – Řimovice – Sázava – Šetějovice – Slověnice – Smilkov – Snět – Soběhrdy – Soutice – Stranný – Strojetice – Střezimíř – Struhařov – Studený – Tehov – Teplýšovice – Tichonice – Tisem – Tomice – Třebešice – Trhový Štěpánov – Týnec nad Sázavou – Václavice – Veliš – Vlašim – Vodslivy – Vojkov – Votice – Vracovice – Vranov – Vrchotovy Janovice – Všechlapy – Vysoký Újezd – Xaverov – Zdislavice – Zvěstov

== Geography ==
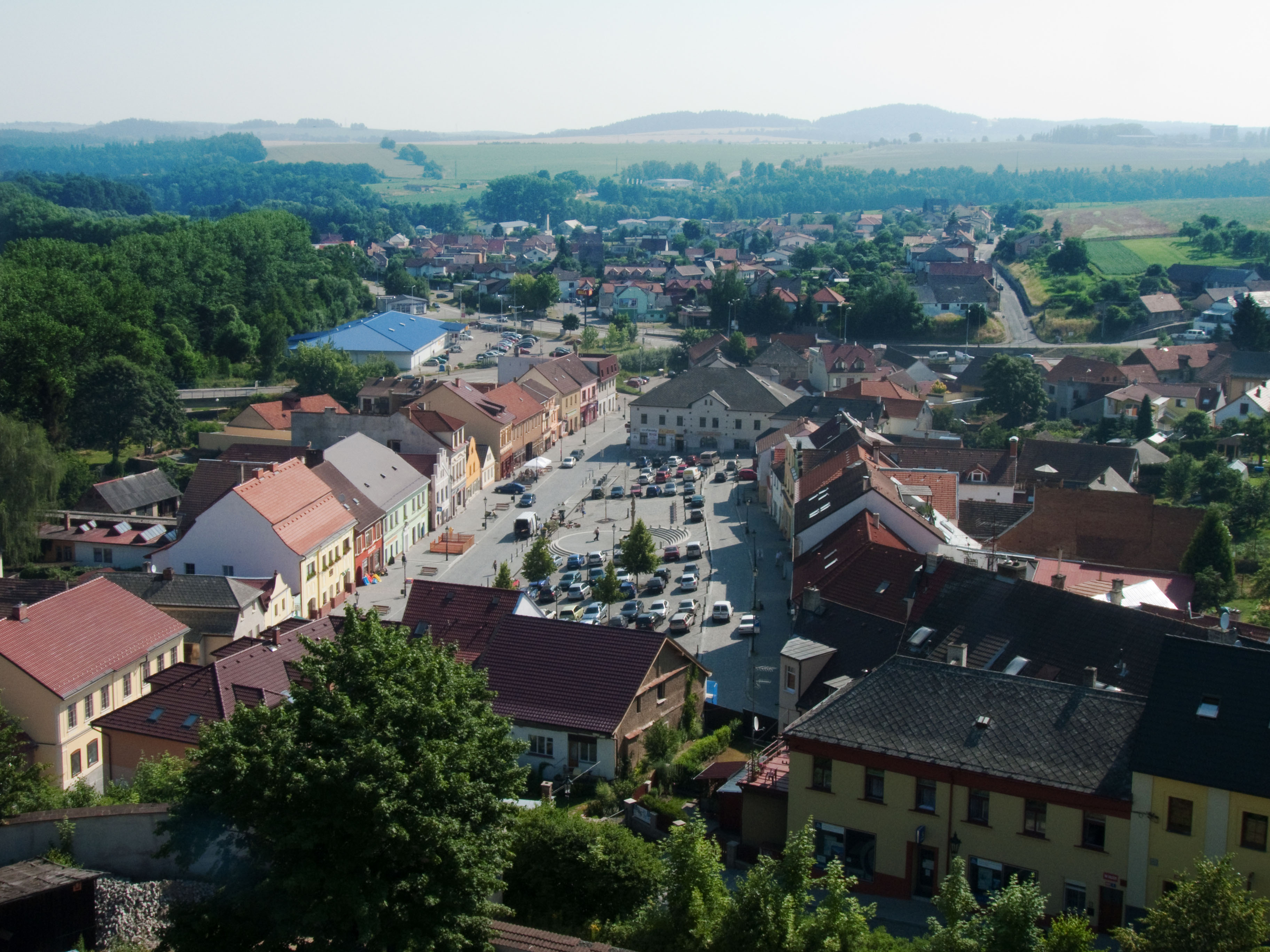
Vlašim and surrounding landscape

A rugged and hilly landscape is typical for the district. The territory extends into three geomorphological mesoregions: Benešov Uplands (north), Vlašim Uplands (south) and Křemešník Highlands (smaller part in the east). The highest point of the district is the Mezivrata hill in Neustupov with an elevation of 713 m (2,339 ft), the lowest point is the Štěchovice Reservoir in Krňany at 220 m (720 ft).

The area is rich in watercourses and ponds. The most important river is the Sázava, which forms the north and northeast boundary of the district before crossing it on the northwest. Other important rivers of the district area its tributaries Blanice and Želivka. Slapy and Štěchovice reservoirs, built on the Vltava River, form the western boundary of the district. The largest body of water is Švihov Reservoir, built on the Želivka. It is the fourth largest reservoir in the country.

From the total district area of 1,474.9 km^{2} (569.5 sq mi), agricultural land occupies 903.0 km^{2} (348.7 sq mi), forests occupy 414.5 km^{2} (160.0 sq mi), and water area occupies 33.6 km^{2} (13.0 sq mi). Forests cover 28.1% of the district's area.

Blaník is the only protected landscape area in the district, covering the surrounding area of the Velký Blaník mountain.

== Demographics ==
Historical population

Year	Pop.	±%
1869	115,753	—
1880	116,485	+0.6%
1890	115,439	−0.9%
1900	113,862	−1.4%
1910	112,366	−1.3%

Year	Pop.	±%
1921	110,248	−1.9%
1930	107,076	−2.9%
1950	93,904	−12.3%
1961	96,145	+2.4%
1970	92,470	−3.8%

Year	Pop.	±%
1980	94,126	+1.8%
1991	91,619	−2.7%
2001	90,625	−1.1%
2011	95,459	+5.3%
2021	100,347	+5.1%

Source: Censuses

=== Most populous municipalities ===
Name	Population	Area (km^{2})
Benešov	17,025	47
Vlašim	11,329	41
Týnec nad Sázavou	5,732	26
Votice	4,777	36
Bystřice	4,694	63
Sázava	3,906	20
Čerčany	3,175	6
Neveklov	2,779	54
Pyšely	2,361	13
Divišov	1,849	31

== Economy ==
The largest employers with headquarters in Benešov District and at least 500 employees are:

Economic entity	Location	Number of employees	Main activity
Sellier & Bellot	Vlašim	1,500–1,999	Manufacture of ammunition
Benešov Hospital	Benešov	1,000–1,499	Health care
RABBIT	Trhový Štěpánov	500–999	Food industry

== Transport ==
The D1 motorway from Prague to Brno passes through the northern and eastern part of the district. The European route E55 separates from it, which passes across the district and continues as D3 motorway in its south.

== Sights ==
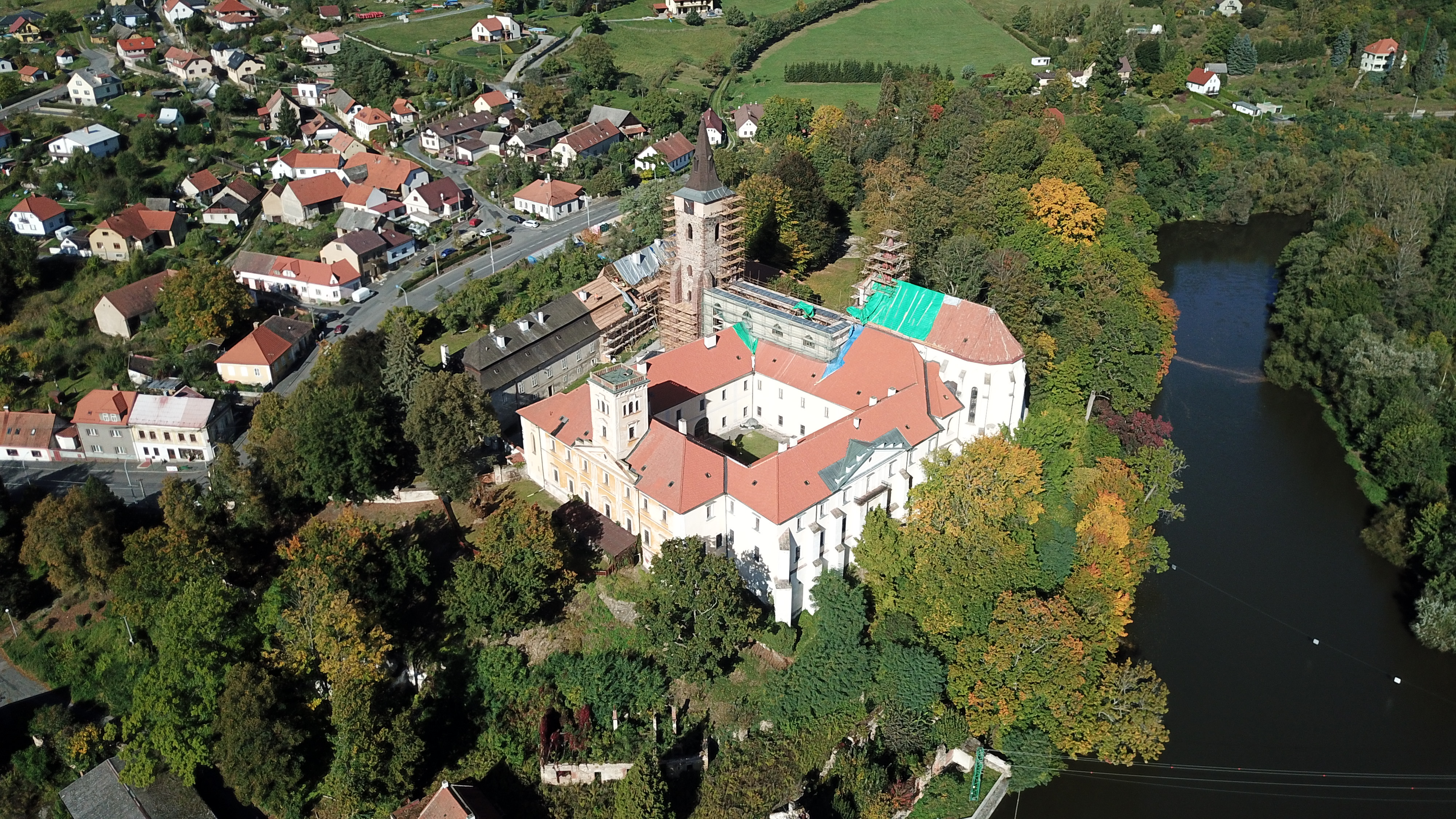
Sázava Monastery

The most important monuments in the district, protected as national cultural monuments, are:

- Sázava Monastery
- Konopiště Castle
- Český Šternberk Castle

The best-preserved settlement, which is the only one protected as a monument zone, is Načeradec.

The most visited tourist destinations are the Konopiště and Český Šternberk castles.
