= Děkanovice =

- Municipality
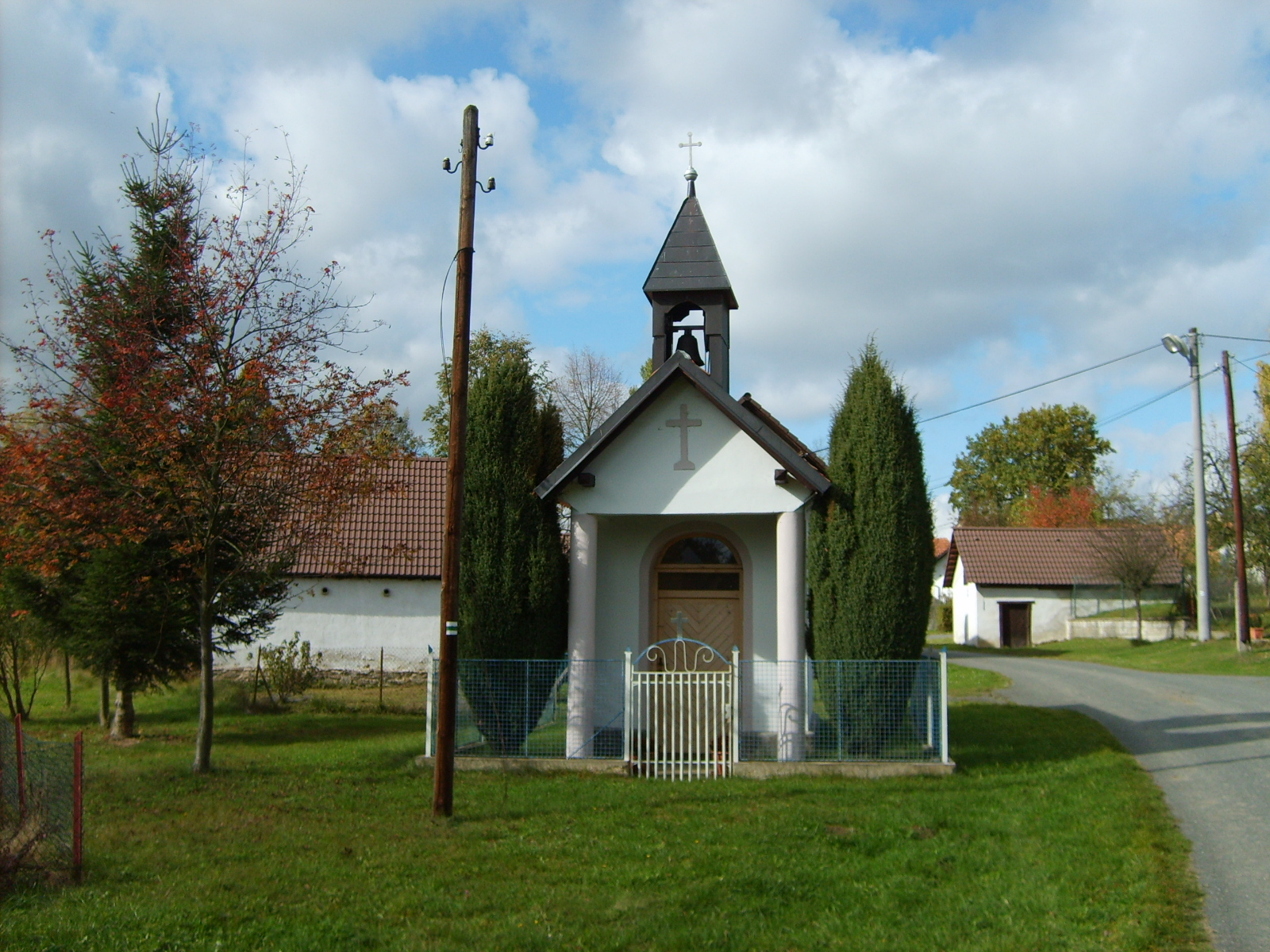
- Centre of Děkanovice with a chapel

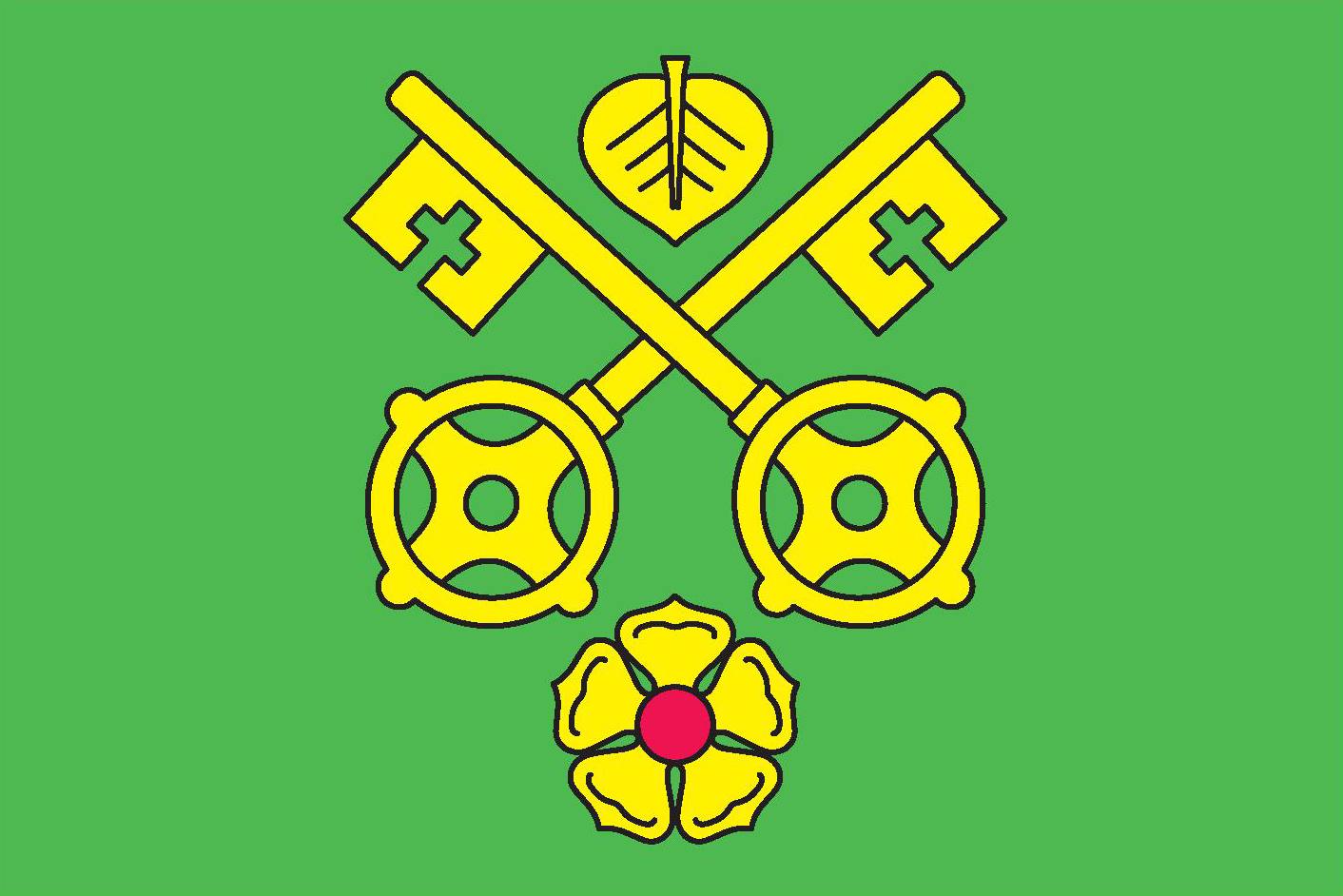
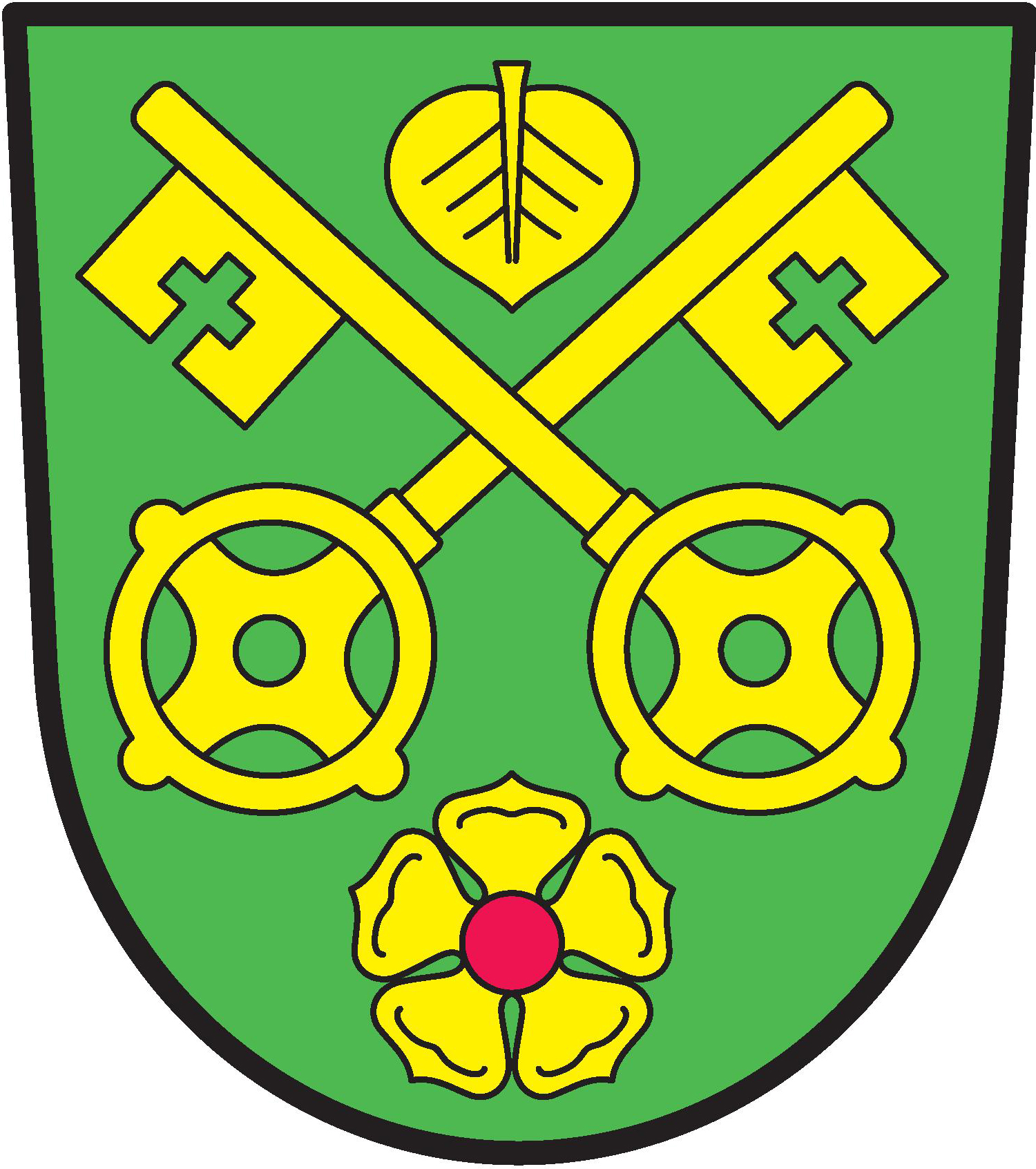
- Flag Coat of arms

- Location in the Czech Republic
- Coordinates: 49°37′7″N 15°8′55″E
- Country: Czech Republic
- Region: Central Bohemian
- District: Benešov
- First mentioned: 1352

Area
  - Total: 4.08 km^{2} (1.58 sq mi)
- Elevation: 470 m (1,540 ft)

Population (2026-01-01)
  - Total: 65
  - Density: 16/km^{2} (41/sq mi)
- Time zone: UTC+1 (CET)
  - Summer (DST): UTC+2 (CEST)
- Postal code: 257 68
- Website: www.dekanovice.cz

Děkanovice is a municipality and village in Benešov District in the Central Bohemian Region of the Czech Republic. It has about 70 inhabitants.

== Demographics ==
Historical population
Year	Pop.	±%
1869	177	—
1880	167	−5.6%
1890	152	−9.0%
1900	158	+3.9%
1910	185	+17.1%
1921	182	−1.6%
1930	166	−8.8%
1950	135	−18.7%
1961	144	+6.7%
1970	132	−8.3%
1980	102	−22.7%
1991	83	−18.6%
2001	64	−22.9%
2011	59	−7.8%
2021	59	+0.0%
Source: Censuses
