= Mnichovice (Benešov District) =

- Municipality
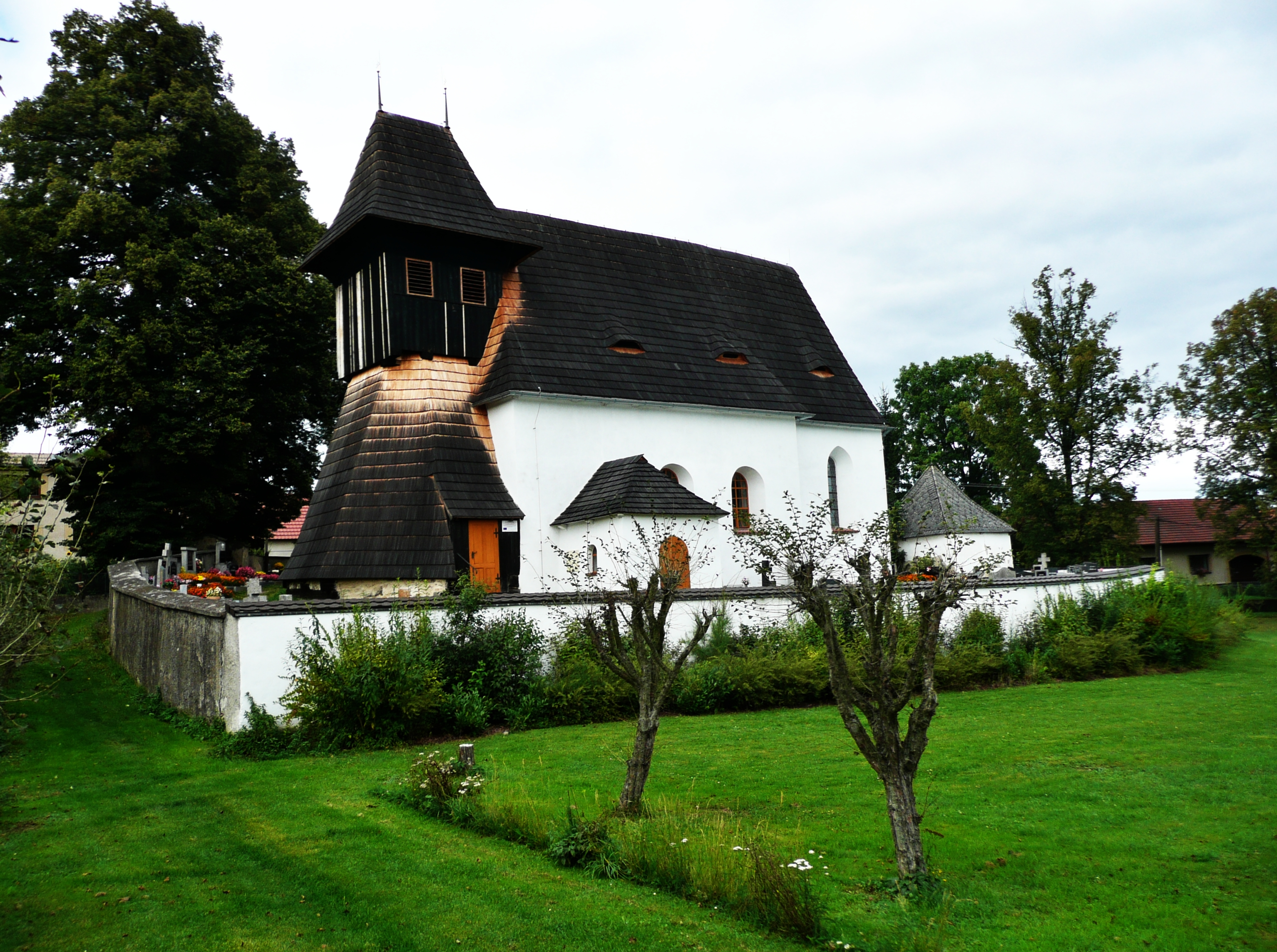
- Church of Saints Philip and James

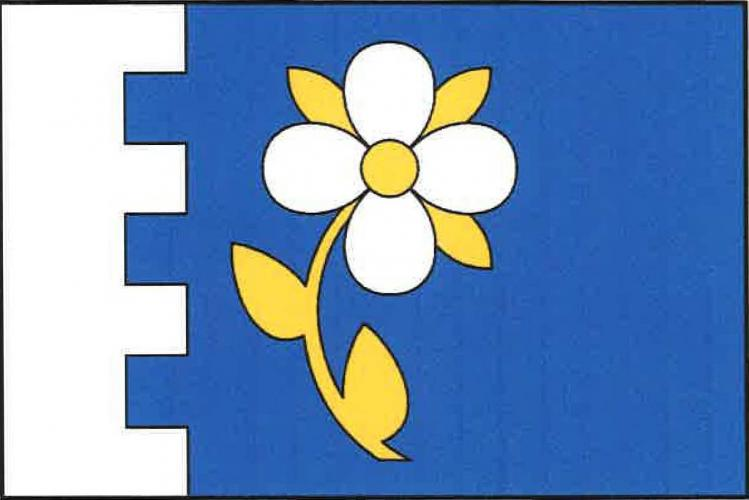
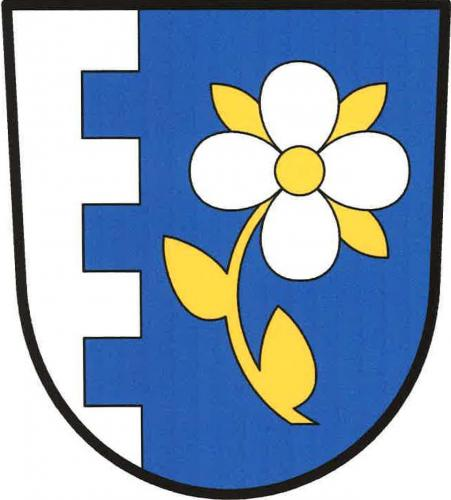
- Flag Coat of arms

- Location in the Czech Republic
- Coordinates: 49°40′7″N 15°2′23″E
- Country: Czech Republic
- Region: Central Bohemian
- District: Benešov
- First mentioned: 1352

Area
  - Total: 9.21 km^{2} (3.56 sq mi)
- Elevation: 452 m (1,483 ft)

Population (2026-01-01)
  - Total: 223
  - Density: 24.2/km^{2} (62.7/sq mi)
- Time zone: UTC+1 (CET)
  - Summer (DST): UTC+2 (CEST)
- Postal code: 257 65
- Website: www.obec-mnichovice.cz

Mnichovice is a municipality and village in Benešov District in the Central Bohemian Region of the Czech Republic. It has about 200 inhabitants.

== Demographics ==
Historical population
Year	Pop.	±%
1869	511	—
1880	549	+7.4%
1890	557	+1.5%
1900	540	−3.1%
1910	526	−2.6%
1921	508	−3.4%
1930	454	−10.6%
1950	371	−18.3%
1961	351	−5.4%
1970	304	−13.4%
1980	265	−12.8%
1991	231	−12.8%
2001	238	+3.0%
2011	184	−22.7%
2021	211	+14.7%
Source: Censuses
