= Tomice (Benešov District) =

- Municipality
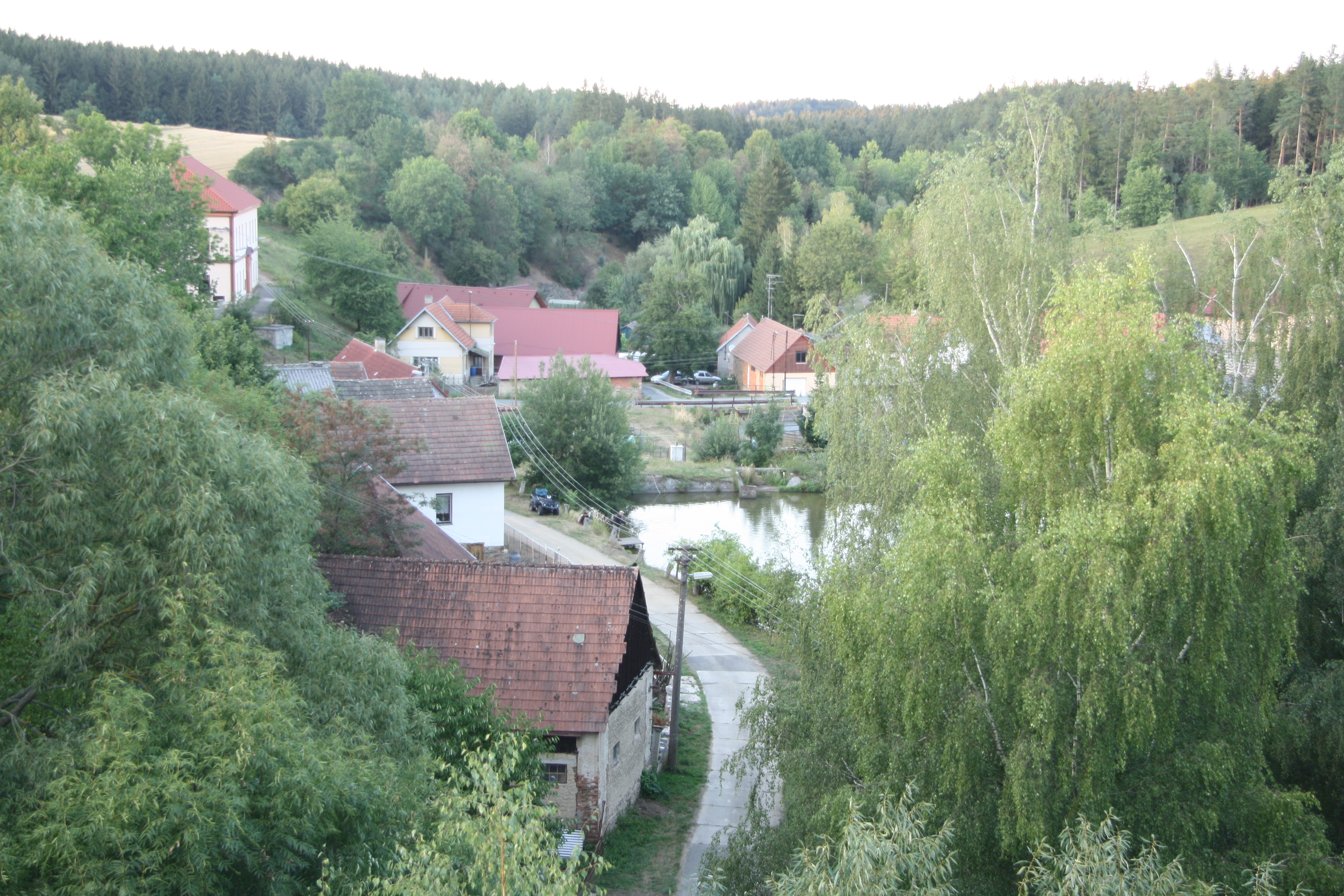
- General view

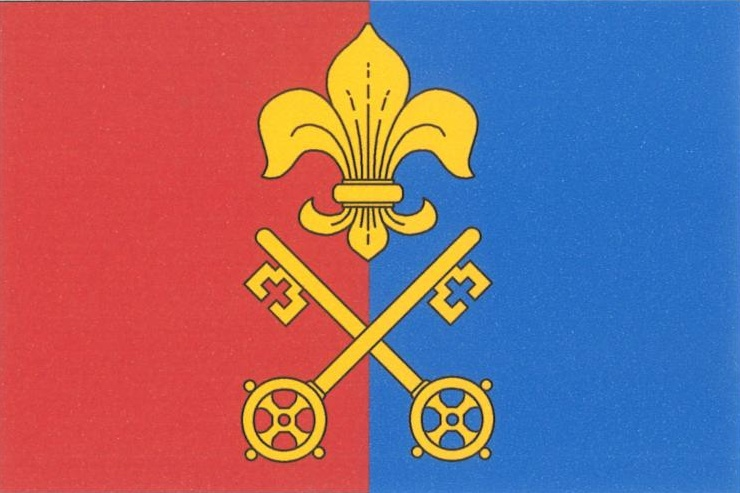
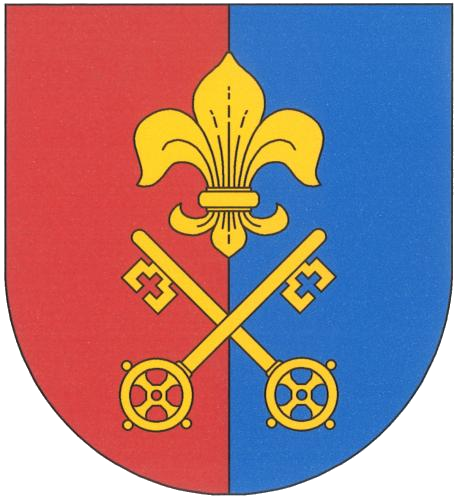
- Flag Coat of arms

- Location in the Czech Republic
- Coordinates: 49°38′42″N 15°9′26″E
- Country: Czech Republic
- Region: Central Bohemian
- District: Benešov
- First mentioned: 1352

Area
  - Total: 7.22 km^{2} (2.79 sq mi)
- Elevation: 494 m (1,621 ft)

Population (2026-01-01)
  - Total: 122
  - Density: 16.9/km^{2} (43.8/sq mi)
- Time zone: UTC+1 (CET)
  - Summer (DST): UTC+2 (CEST)
- Postal code: 257 68
- Website: tomice.cz

Tomice is a municipality and village in Benešov District in the Central Bohemian Region of the Czech Republic. It has about 100 inhabitants.

== Demographics ==
Historical population
Year	Pop.	±%
1869	321	—
1880	362	+12.8%
1890	356	−1.7%
1900	381	+7.0%
1910	389	+2.1%
1921	369	−5.1%
1930	369	+0.0%
1950	289	−21.7%
1961	279	−3.5%
1970	225	−19.4%
1980	199	−11.6%
1991	138	−30.7%
2001	130	−5.8%
2011	136	+4.6%
2021	134	−1.5%
Source: Censuses
