= Tichonice =

- Municipality
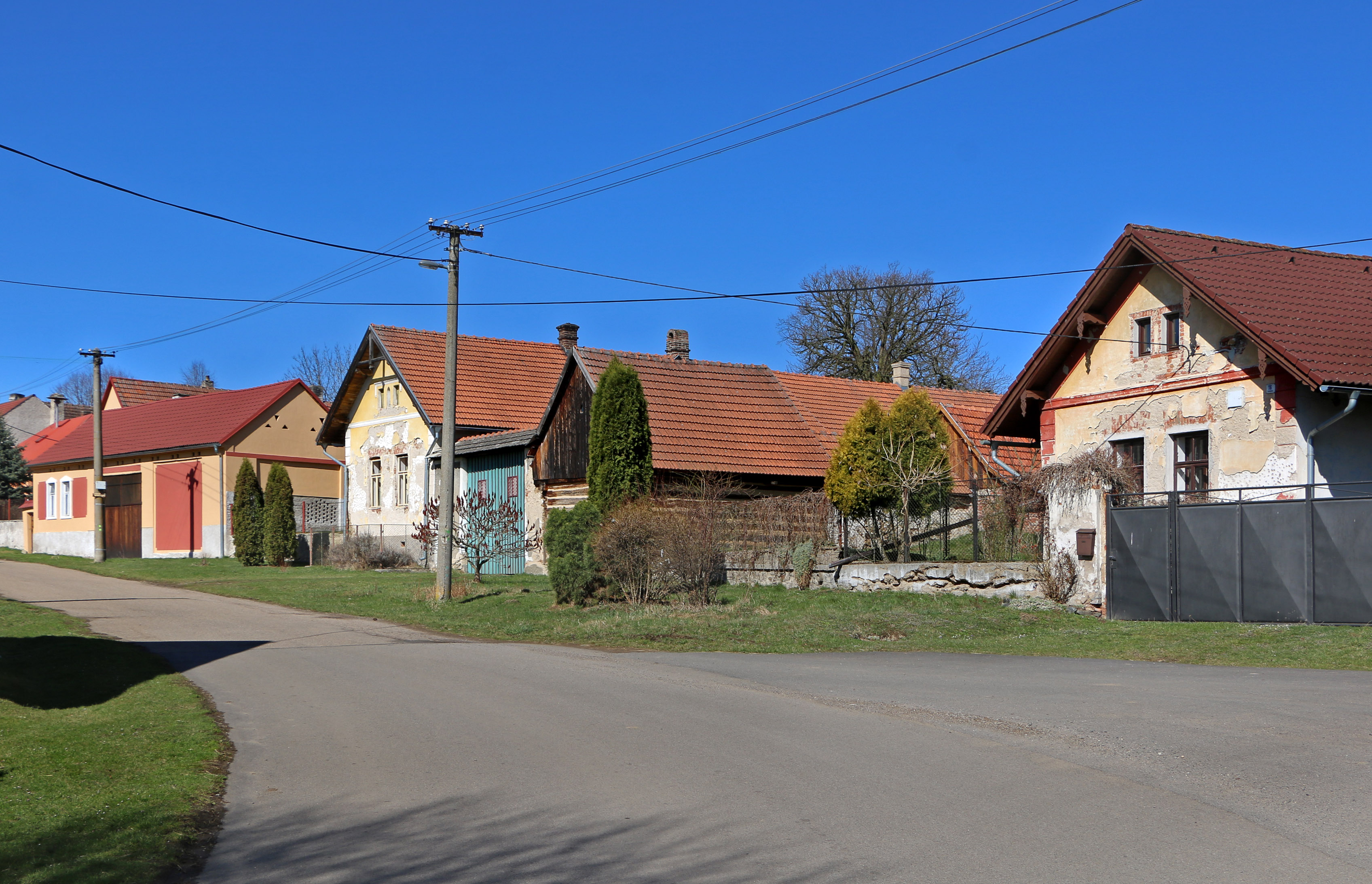
- Centre of Tichonice

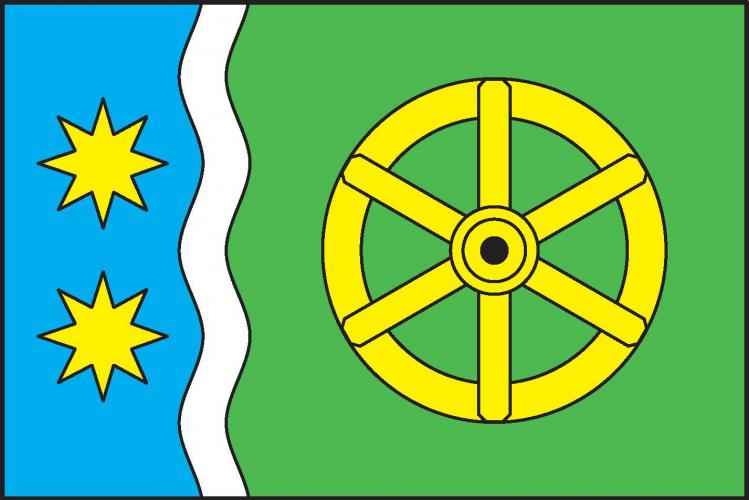
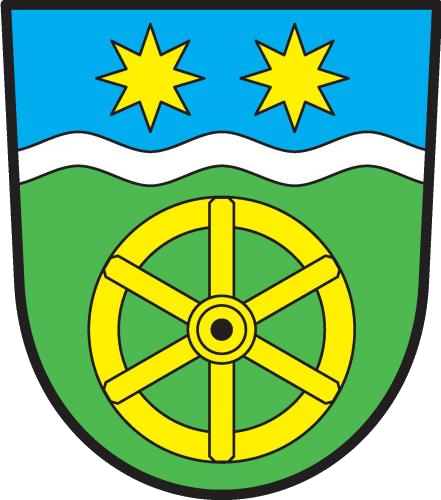
- Flag Coat of arms

- Location in the Czech Republic
- Coordinates: 49°46′38″N 14°59′32″E
- Country: Czech Republic
- Region: Central Bohemian
- District: Benešov
- First mentioned: 1365

Area
  - Total: 9.99 km^{2} (3.86 sq mi)
- Elevation: 399 m (1,309 ft)

Population (2026-01-01)
  - Total: 213
  - Density: 21.3/km^{2} (55.2/sq mi)
- Time zone: UTC+1 (CET)
  - Summer (DST): UTC+2 (CEST)
- Postal code: 257 63
- Website: www.tichonice.cz

Tichonice is a municipality and village in Benešov District in the Central Bohemian Region of the Czech Republic. It has about 200 inhabitants.

== Administrative division ==
Tichonice consists of six municipal parts (in brackets population according to the 2021 census):

- Tichonice (100)
- Chochol (15)
- Kácovec (13)
- Kácovská Lhota (8)
- Pelíškův Most (7)
- Soušice (59)

== History ==
The first written mention of Tichonice is from 1365.

== Demographics ==
Historical population
Year	Pop.	±%
1869	696	—
1880	722	+3.7%
1890	795	+10.1%
1900	741	−6.8%
1910	723	−2.4%
1921	666	−7.9%
1930	597	−10.4%
1950	482	−19.3%
1961	484	+0.4%
1970	350	−27.7%
1980	266	−24.0%
1991	231	−13.2%
2001	208	−10.0%
2011	189	−9.1%
2021	202	+6.9%
Source: Censuses
