= Drahňovice =

- Municipality
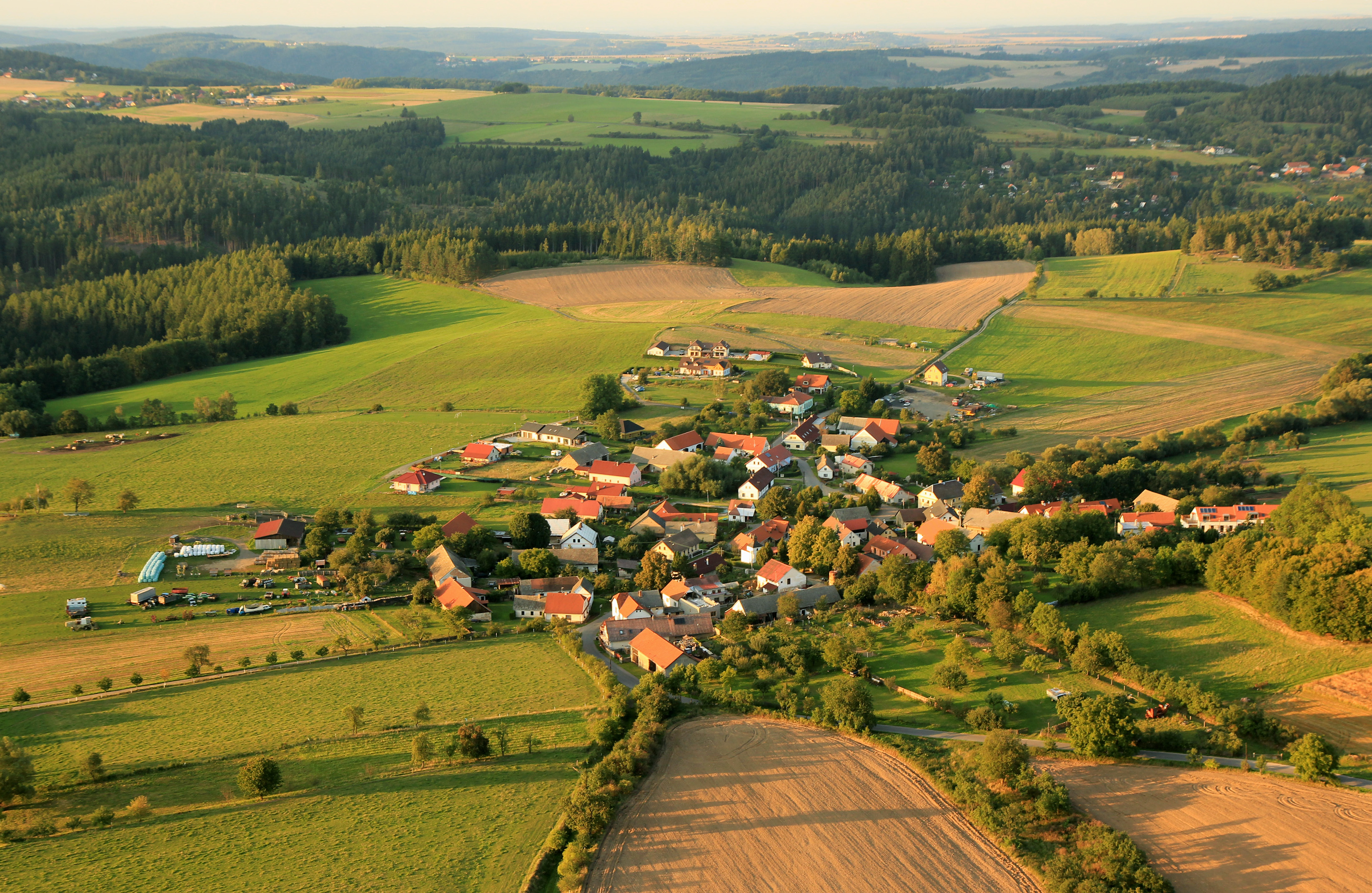
- Aerial view from the south

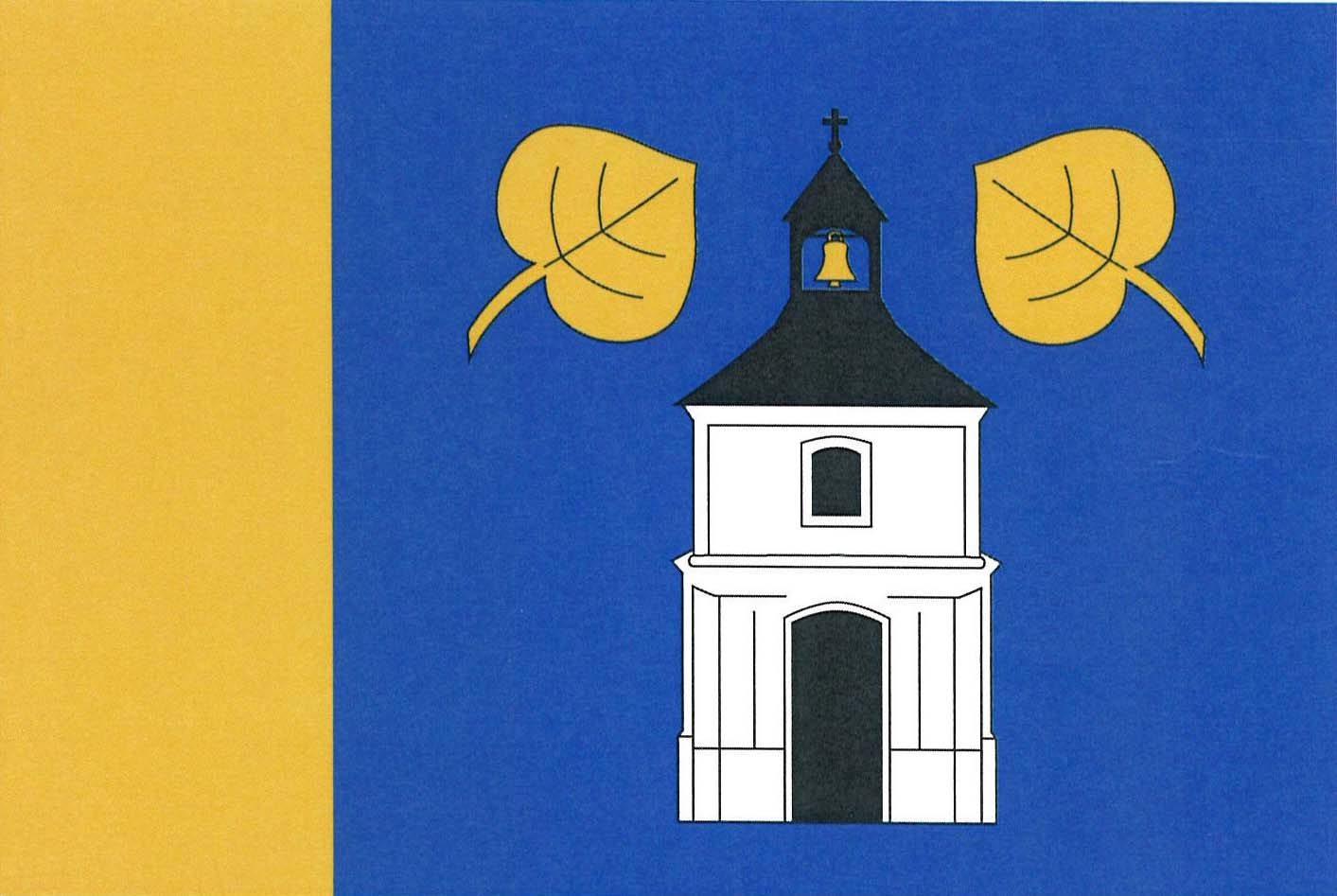
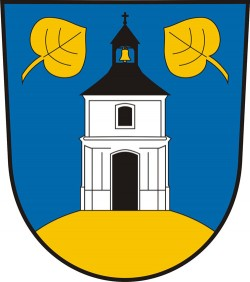
- Flag Coat of arms

- Location in the Czech Republic
- Coordinates: 49°49′21″N 14°54′6″E
- Country: Czech Republic
- Region: Central Bohemian
- District: Benešov
- First mentioned: 1401

Area
  - Total: 8.17 km^{2} (3.15 sq mi)
- Elevation: 427 m (1,401 ft)

Population (2026-01-01)
  - Total: 103
  - Density: 12.6/km^{2} (32.7/sq mi)
- Time zone: UTC+1 (CET)
  - Summer (DST): UTC+2 (CEST)
- Postal code: 257 26
- Website: www.drahnovice.cz

Drahňovice is a municipality and village in Benešov District in the Central Bohemian Region of the Czech Republic. It has about 100 inhabitants.

== Demographics ==
Historical population
Year	Pop.	±%
1869	239	—
1880	246	+2.9%
1890	263	+6.9%
1900	279	+6.1%
1910	246	−11.8%
1921	226	−8.1%
1930	186	−17.7%
1950	130	−30.1%
1961	123	−5.4%
1970	88	−28.5%
1980	68	−22.7%
1991	50	−26.5%
2001	61	+22.0%
2011	71	+16.4%
2021	105	+47.9%
Source: Censuses
