= Borovnice (Benešov District) =

- Municipality
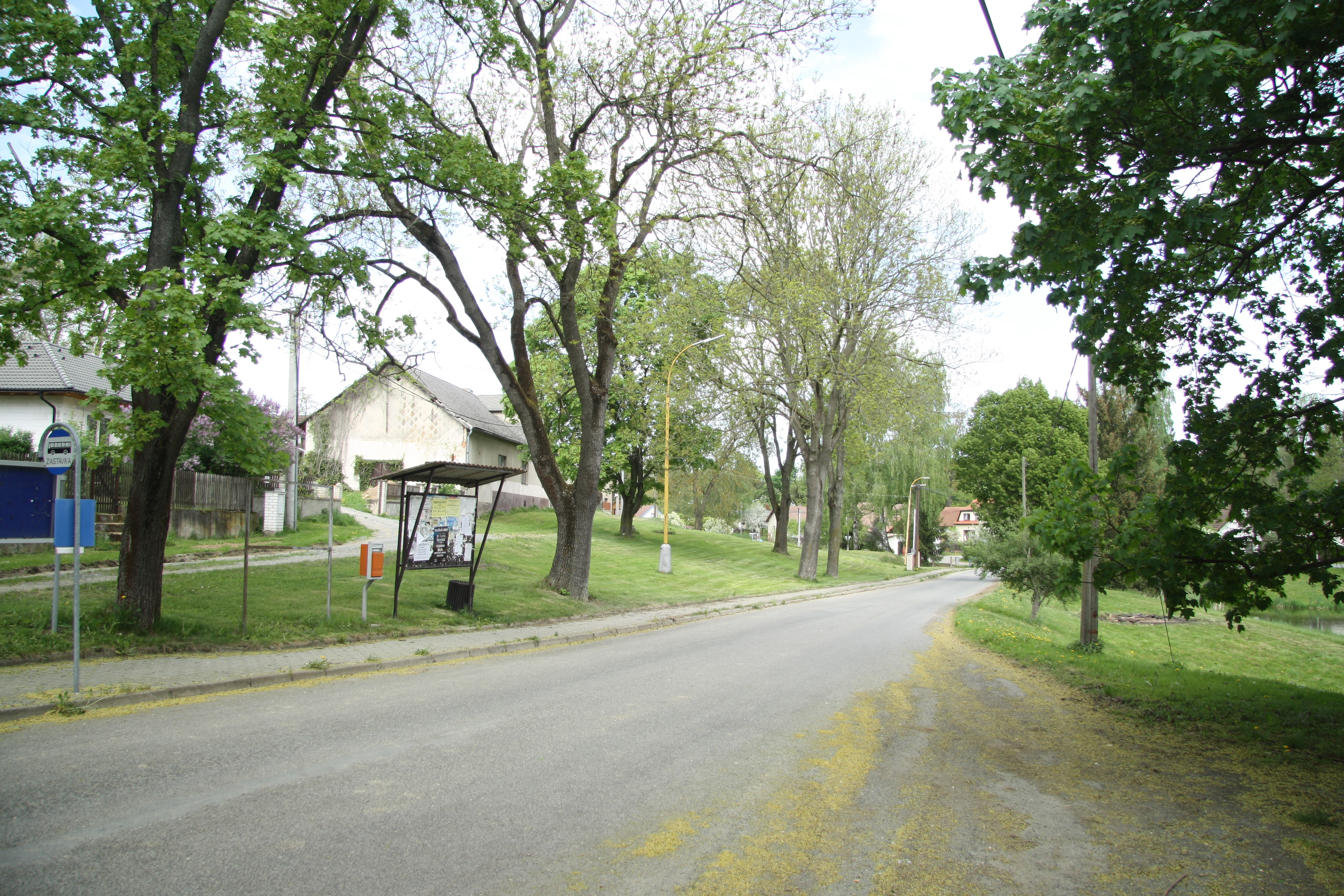
- Main road

- Location in the Czech Republic
- Coordinates: 49°38′56″N 15°1′6″E
- Country: Czech Republic
- Region: Central Bohemian
- District: Benešov
- First mentioned: 1352

Area
  - Total: 3.10 km^{2} (1.20 sq mi)
- Elevation: 452 m (1,483 ft)

Population (2026-01-01)
  - Total: 95
  - Density: 31/km^{2} (79/sq mi)
- Time zone: UTC+1 (CET)
  - Summer (DST): UTC+2 (CEST)
- Postal code: 257 65
- Website: www.obec-borovnice.cz

Borovnice (Czech pronunciation: [ˈborovɲɪtsɛ]; German: Borownitz) is a municipality and village in Benešov District in the Central Bohemian Region of the Czech Republic. It has about 100 inhabitants.

== Etymology ==
The name is derived from the Czech adjective borovná (which is derived from borovice, i.e. 'pine'). Borovnice was a common toponym for pine forests and streams flowing through pine forests, and from there it was transferred to settlements.

== Demographics ==
Historical population
| Year | Pop. | ±% |
|---|---|---|
| 1869 | 219 | — |
| 1880 | 191 | −12.8% |
| 1890 | 198 | +3.7% |
| 1900 | 181 | −8.6% |
| 1910 | 183 | +1.1% |
| 1921 | 186 | +1.6% |
| 1930 | 173 | −7.0% |
| 1950 | 142 | −17.9% |
| 1961 | 155 | +9.2% |
| 1970 | 151 | −2.6% |
| 1980 | 146 | −3.3% |
| 1991 | 116 | −20.5% |
| 2001 | 96 | −17.2% |
| 2011 | 74 | −22.9% |
| 2021 | 86 | +16.2% |
Source: Censuses
