= Javorník (Benešov District) =

- Municipality
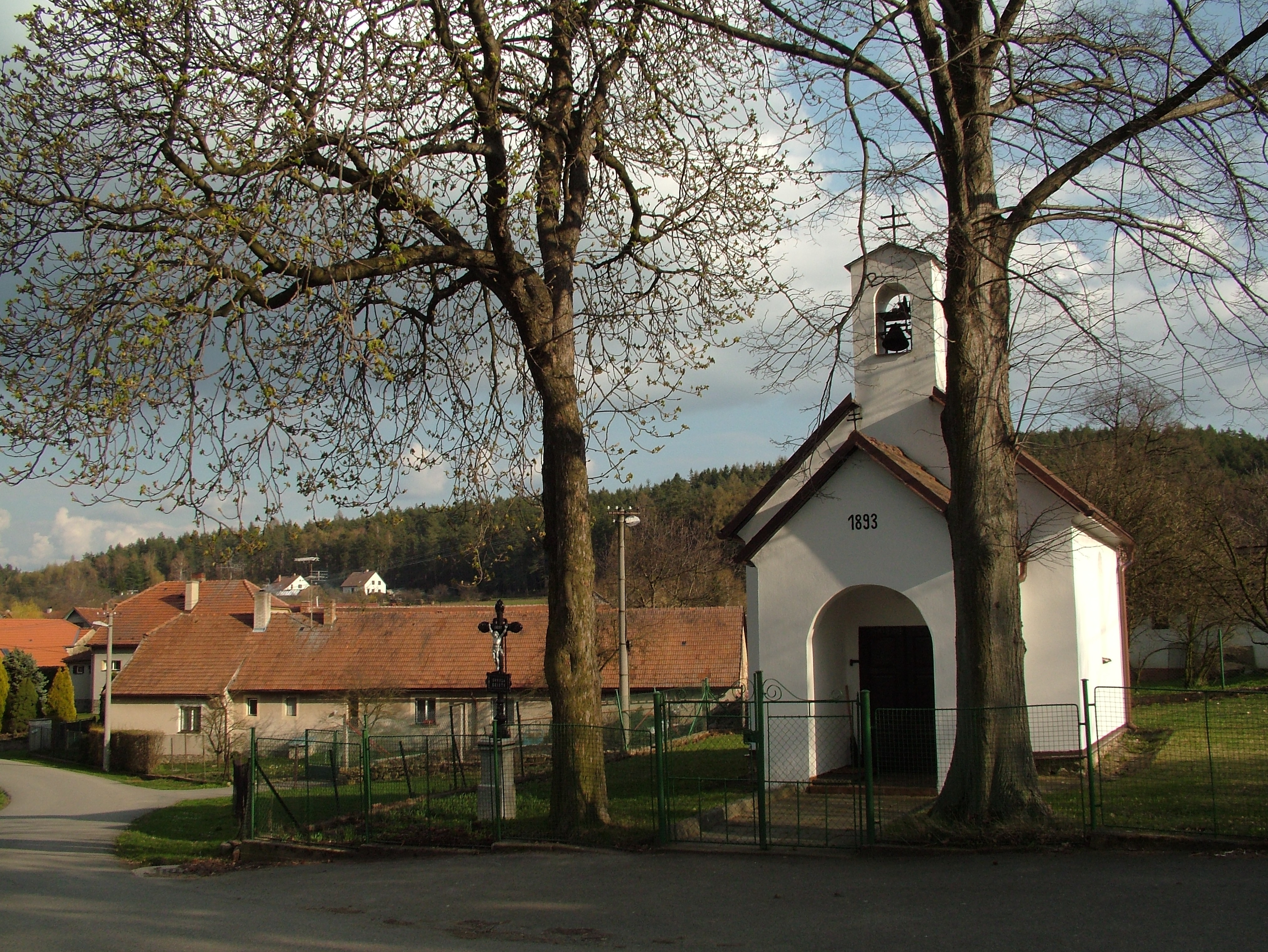
- Chapel of Our Lady of the Seven Sorrows

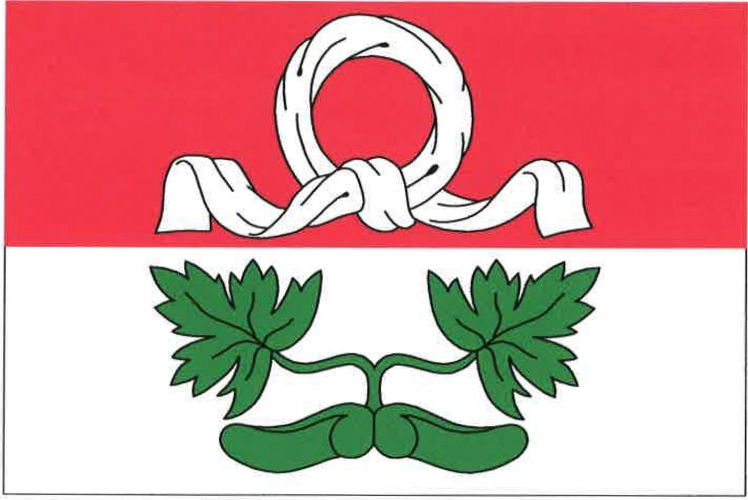
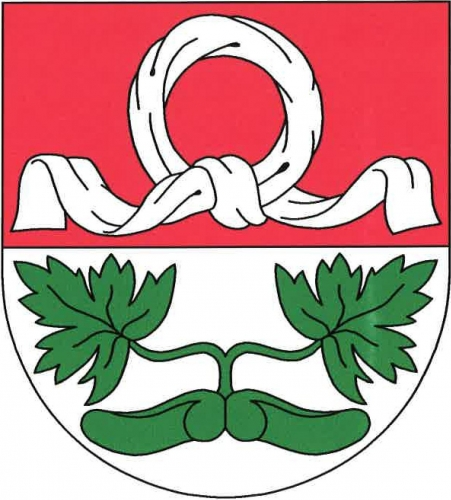
- Flag Coat of arms

- Location in the Czech Republic
- Coordinates: 49°41′12″N 15°1′36″E
- Country: Czech Republic
- Region: Central Bohemian
- District: Benešov
- First mentioned: 1295

Area
  - Total: 7.30 km^{2} (2.82 sq mi)
- Elevation: 457 m (1,499 ft)

Population (2026-01-01)
  - Total: 153
  - Density: 21.0/km^{2} (54.3/sq mi)
- Time zone: UTC+1 (CET)
  - Summer (DST): UTC+2 (CEST)
- Postal code: 257 63
- Website: www.javornikuvlasimi.cz

Javorník is a municipality and village in Benešov District in the Central Bohemian Region of the Czech Republic. It has about 200 inhabitants.

== Demographics ==
Historical population
Year	Pop.	±%
1869	226	—
1880	283	+25.2%
1890	289	+2.1%
1900	229	−20.8%
1910	238	+3.9%
1921	240	+0.8%
1930	208	−13.3%
1950	195	−6.2%
1961	174	−10.8%
1970	164	−5.7%
1980	160	−2.4%
1991	148	−7.5%
2001	136	−8.1%
2011	114	−16.2%
2021	110	−3.5%
Source: Censuses
