= Blažejovice =

- Municipality
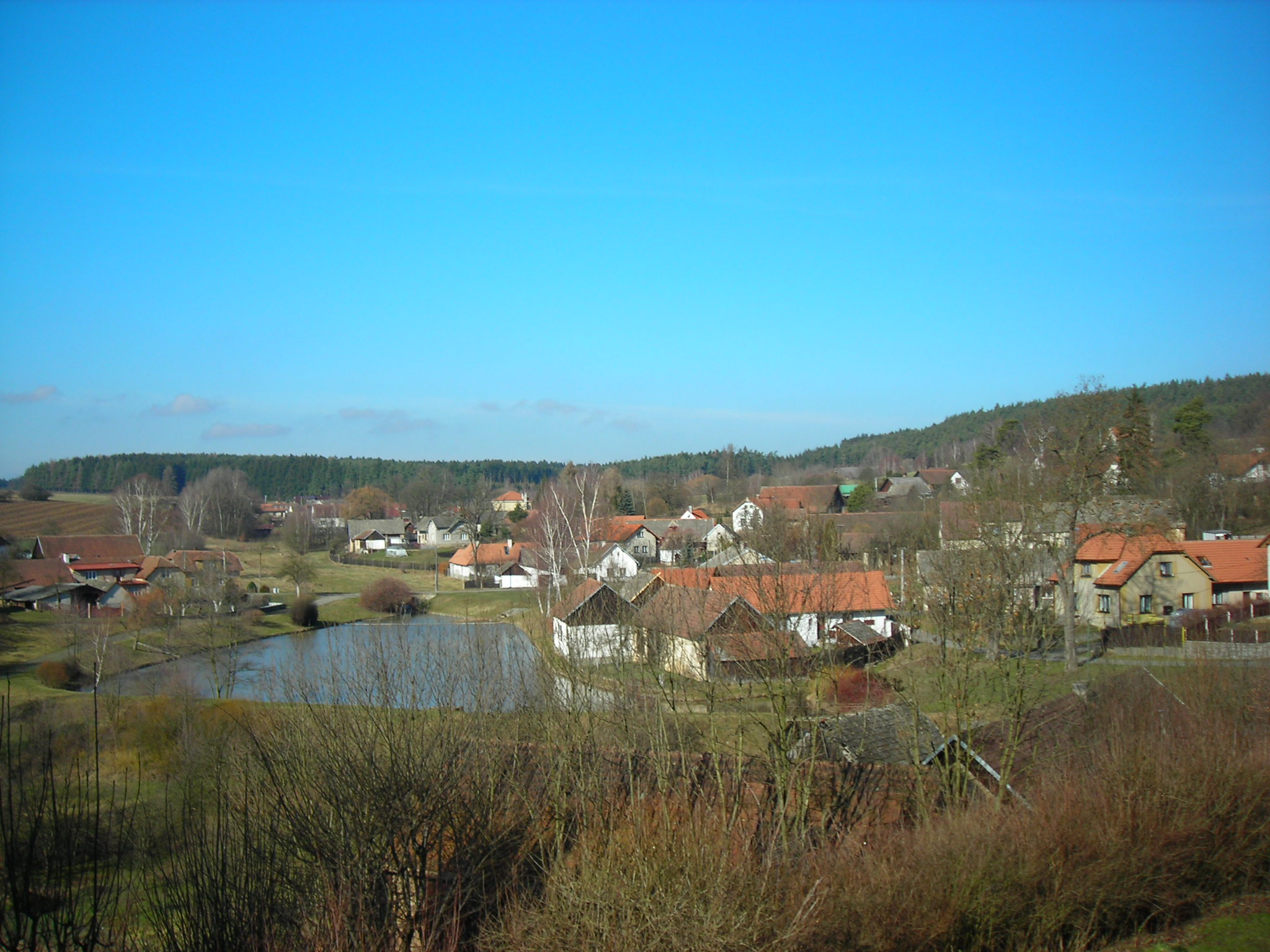
- General view

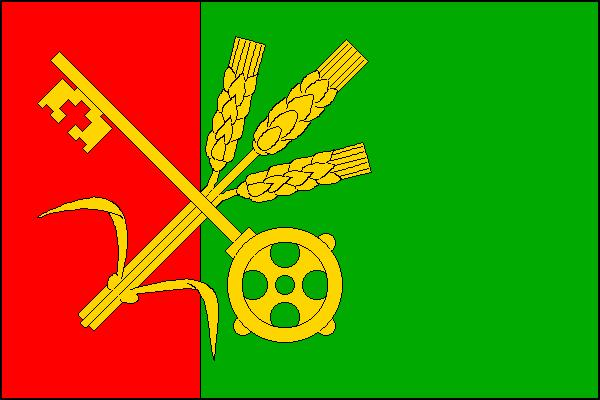
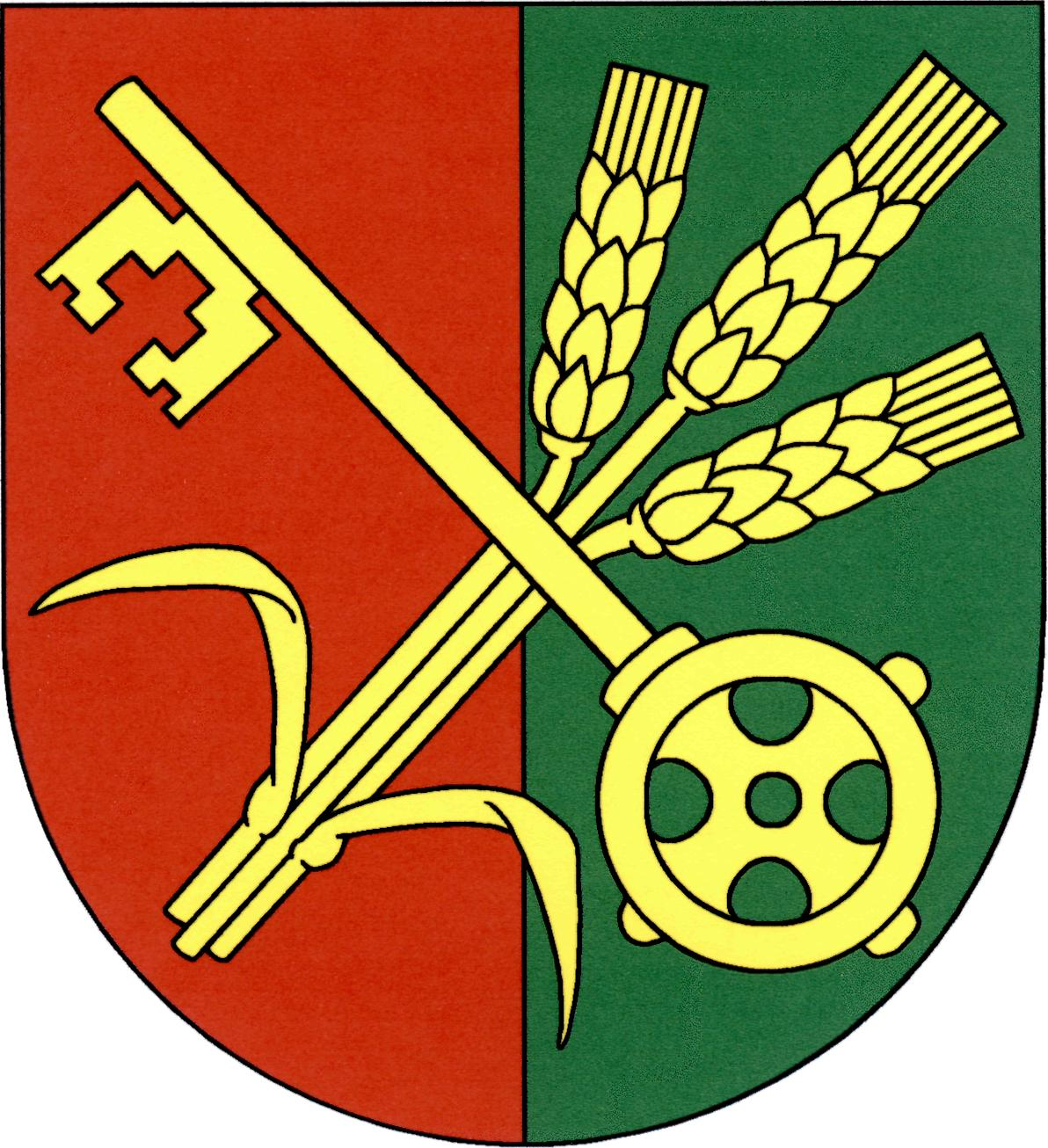
- Flag Coat of arms

- Location in the Czech Republic
- Coordinates: 49°37′11″N 15°12′0″E
- Country: Czech Republic
- Region: Central Bohemian
- District: Benešov
- First mentioned: 1354

Area
  - Total: 4.63 km^{2} (1.79 sq mi)
- Elevation: 432 m (1,417 ft)

Population (2026-01-01)
  - Total: 113
  - Density: 24.4/km^{2} (63.2/sq mi)
- Time zone: UTC+1 (CET)
  - Summer (DST): UTC+2 (CEST)
- Postal code: 257 68
- Website: www.obecblazejovice.cz

Blažejovice is a municipality and village in Benešov District in the Central Bohemian Region of the Czech Republic. It has about 100 inhabitants.

== Administrative division ==
Blažejovice consists of two municipal parts (in brackets population according to the 2021 census):

- Blažejovice (88)
- Vítonice (10)

== Demographics ==
Historical population
Year	Pop.	±%
1869	306	—
1880	337	+10.1%
1890	350	+3.9%
1900	332	−5.1%
1910	343	+3.3%
1921	351	+2.3%
1930	313	−10.8%
1950	274	−12.5%
1961	245	−10.6%
1970	199	−18.8%
1980	174	−12.6%
1991	134	−23.0%
2001	96	−28.4%
2011	103	+7.3%
2021	98	−4.9%
Source: Censuses
