= Jinošice =

- Village
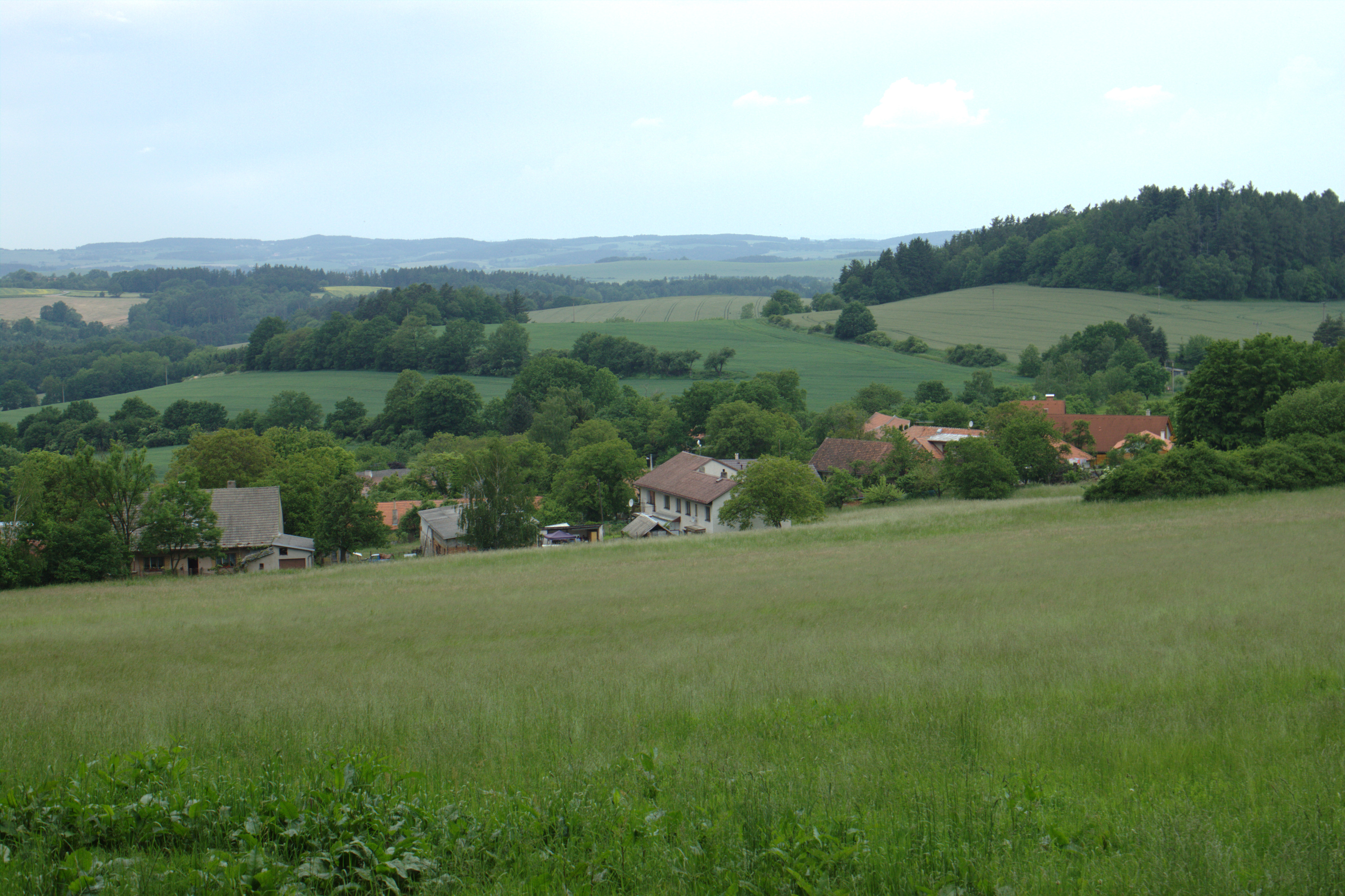
- View from the east

- Location in the Czech Republic
- Coordinates: 49°42′17″N 14°41′20″E
- Country: Czech Republic
- Region: Central Bohemian
- District: Benešov
- Municipality: Bystřice
- First mentioned: 1394

Area
  - Total: 4.45 km^{2} (1.72 sq mi)
- Elevation: 449 m (1,473 ft)

Population (2021)
  - Total: 54
  - Density: 12/km^{2} (31/sq mi)
- Time zone: UTC+1 (CET)
  - Summer (DST): UTC+2 (CEST)
- Postal code: 257 51

Jinošice (German: Jinoschitz) is a village and municipal part of Bystřice in Benešov District in the Central Bohemian Region of the Czech Republic. It has about 50 inhabitants.

== Demographics ==
Historical population
Year	Pop.	±%
1869	193	—
1880	161	−16.6%
1890	168	+4.3%
1900	157	−6.5%
1910	149	−5.1%
1921	168	+12.8%
1930	120	−28.6%
1950	87	−27.5%
1961	112	+28.7%
1970	81	−27.7%
1980	61	−24.7%
1991	39	−36.1%
2001	48	+23.1%
2011	54	+12.5%
2021	54	+0.0%
Source: Censuses
