= Veliš (Benešov District) =

- Municipality
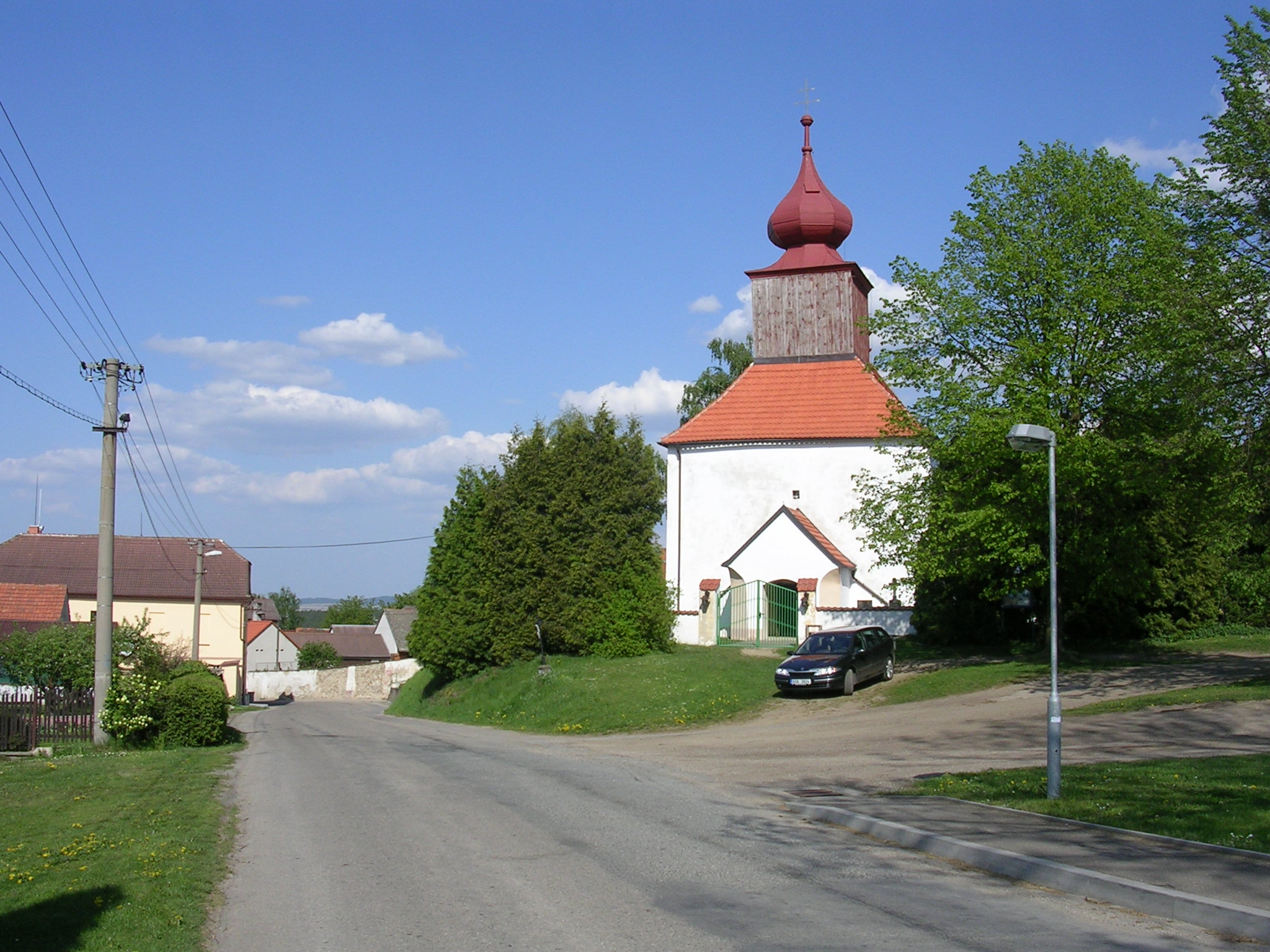
- Church of Saint Joseph

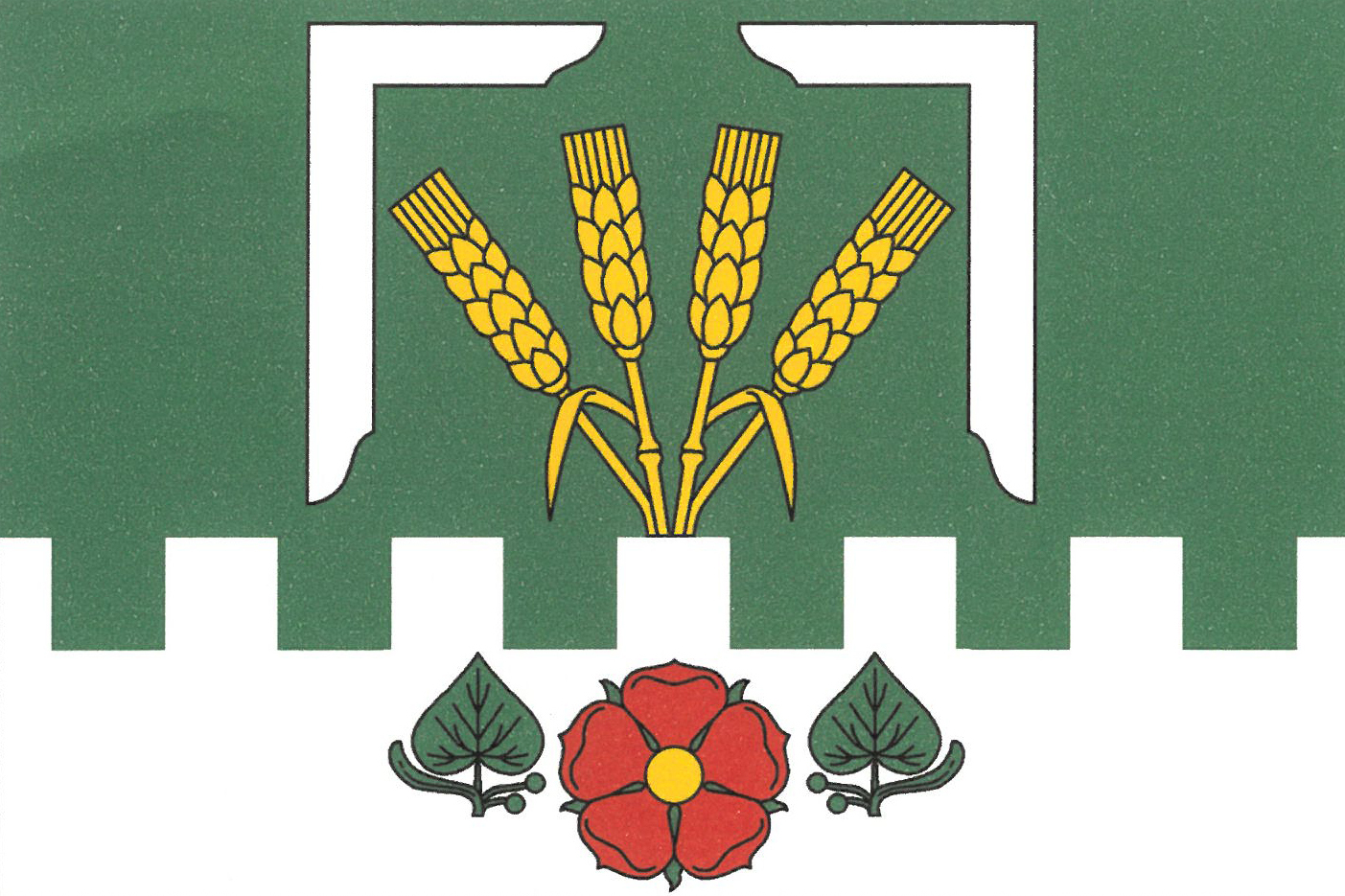
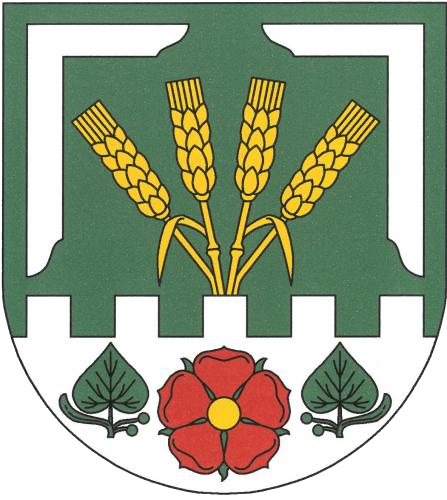
- Flag Coat of arms

- Location in the Czech Republic
- Coordinates: 49°40′7″N 14°49′23″E
- Country: Czech Republic
- Region: Central Bohemian
- District: Benešov
- First mentioned: 1227

Area
  - Total: 12.26 km^{2} (4.73 sq mi)
- Elevation: 432 m (1,417 ft)

Population (2026-01-01)
  - Total: 354
  - Density: 28.9/km^{2} (74.8/sq mi)
- Time zone: UTC+1 (CET)
  - Summer (DST): UTC+2 (CEST)
- Postal codes: 257 01, 257 06
- Website: www.obecvelis.cz

Veliš is a municipality and village in Benešov District in the Central Bohemian Region of the Czech Republic. It has about 400 inhabitants.

== Administrative division ==
Veliš consists of four municipal parts (in brackets population according to the 2021 census):

- Veliš (192)
- Lipiny u Veliše (18)
- Nespery (113)
- Sedlečko (6)

== Demographics ==
Historical population
Year	Pop.	±%
1869	674	—
1880	657	−2.5%
1890	666	+1.4%
1900	671	+0.8%
1910	646	−3.7%
1921	652	+0.9%
1930	560	−14.1%
1950	480	−14.3%
1961	441	−8.1%
1970	398	−9.8%
1980	378	−5.0%
1991	311	−17.7%
2001	323	+3.9%
2011	327	+1.2%
2021	329	+0.6%
Source: Censuses
