= Řimovice =

- Municipality
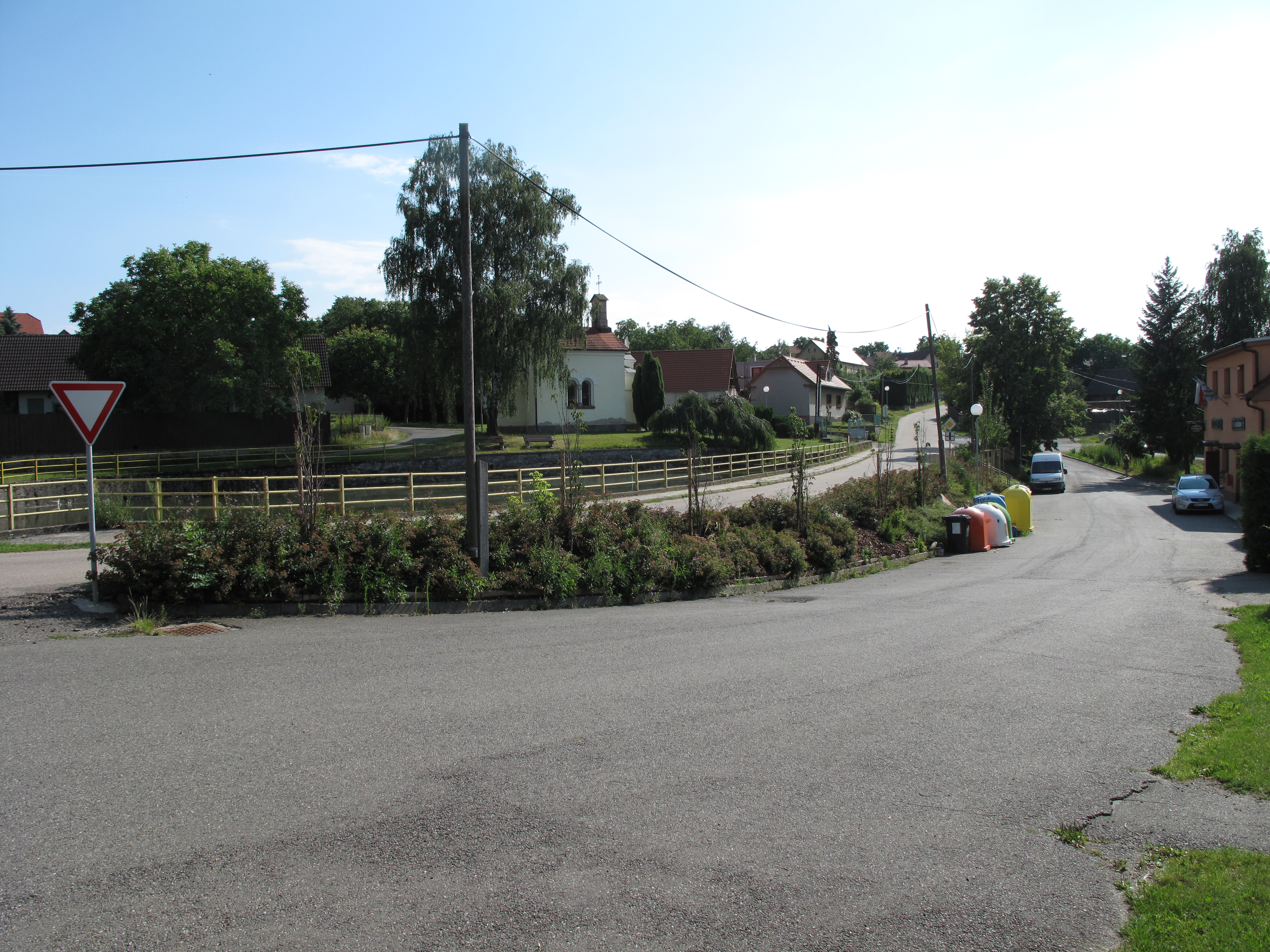
- Centre of Řimovice

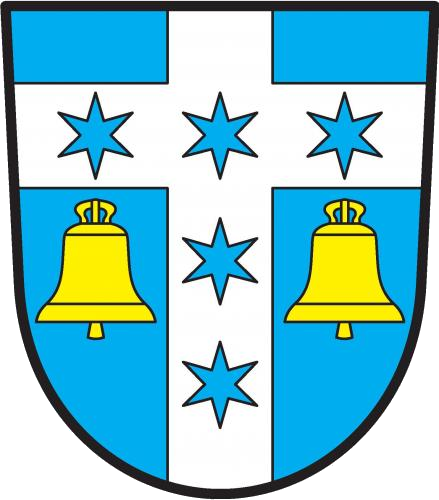
- Flag Coat of arms

- Location in the Czech Republic
- Coordinates: 49°41′47″N 14°56′35″E
- Country: Czech Republic
- Region: Central Bohemian
- District: Benešov
- First mentioned: 1380

Area
  - Total: 3.31 km^{2} (1.28 sq mi)
- Elevation: 452 m (1,483 ft)

Population (2026-01-01)
  - Total: 233
  - Density: 70.4/km^{2} (182/sq mi)
- Time zone: UTC+1 (CET)
  - Summer (DST): UTC+2 (CEST)
- Postal code: 258 01
- Website: www.rimovice.cz

Řimovice is a municipality and village in Benešov District in the Central Bohemian Region of the Czech Republic. It has about 200 inhabitants.

== Demographics ==
Historical population
Year	Pop.	±%
1869	202	—
1880	180	−10.9%
1890	212	+17.8%
1900	210	−0.9%
1910	193	−8.1%
1921	191	−1.0%
1930	196	+2.6%
1950	162	−17.3%
1961	175	+8.0%
1970	184	+5.1%
1980	151	−17.9%
1991	176	+16.6%
2001	186	+5.7%
2011	209	+12.4%
2021	226	+8.1%
Source: Censuses
