= Vodslivy =

- Municipality
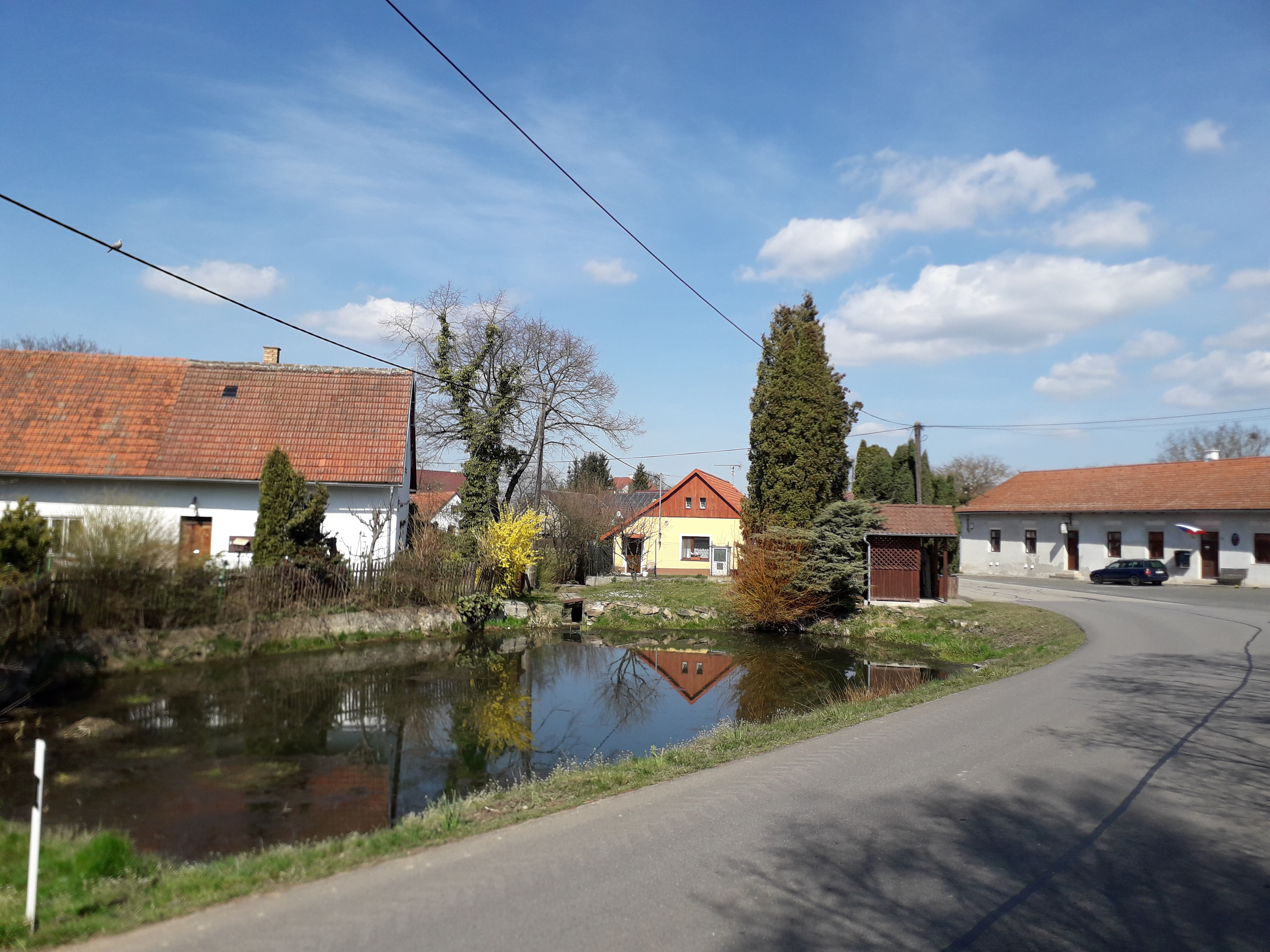
- Pond in the centre of Vodslivy

- Location in the Czech Republic
- Coordinates: 49°50′59″N 14°50′14″E
- Country: Czech Republic
- Region: Central Bohemian
- District: Benešov
- First mentioned: 1436

Area
  - Total: 4.71 km^{2} (1.82 sq mi)
- Elevation: 455 m (1,493 ft)

Population (2026-01-01)
  - Total: 103
  - Density: 21.9/km^{2} (56.6/sq mi)
- Time zone: UTC+1 (CET)
  - Summer (DST): UTC+2 (CEST)
- Postal code: 257 24
- Website: www.vodslivy.cz

Vodslivy is a municipality and village in Benešov District in the Central Bohemian Region of the Czech Republic. It has about 100 inhabitants.

== Demographics ==
Historical population
Year	Pop.	±%
1869	286	—
1880	255	−10.8%
1890	254	−0.4%
1900	246	−3.1%
1910	208	−15.4%
1921	198	−4.8%
1930	175	−11.6%
1950	130	−25.7%
1961	134	+3.1%
1970	126	−6.0%
1980	96	−23.8%
1991	86	−10.4%
2001	96	+11.6%
2011	105	+9.4%
2021	108	+2.9%
Source: Censuses
