= Šetějovice =

- Municipality
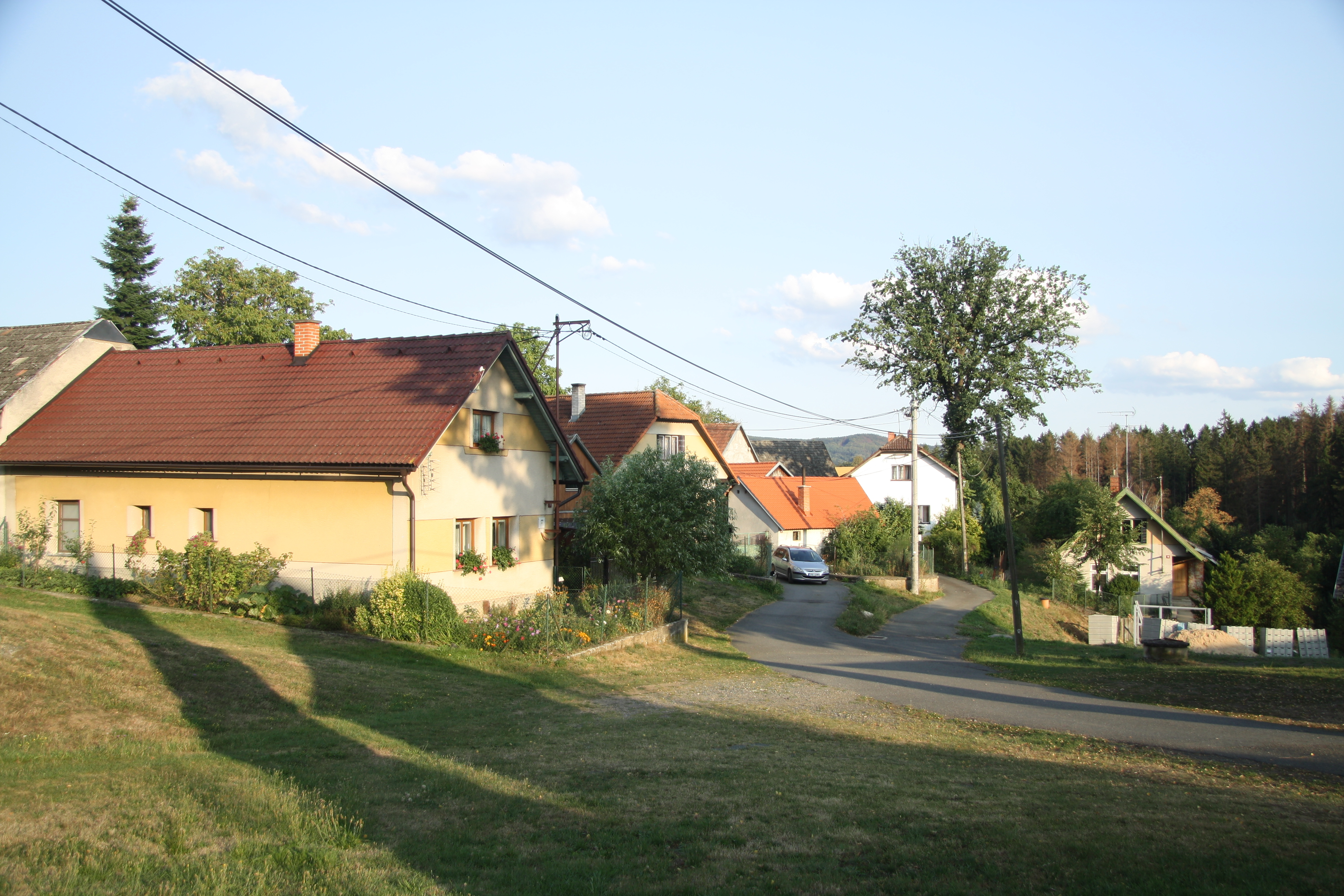
- Centre of Šetějovice

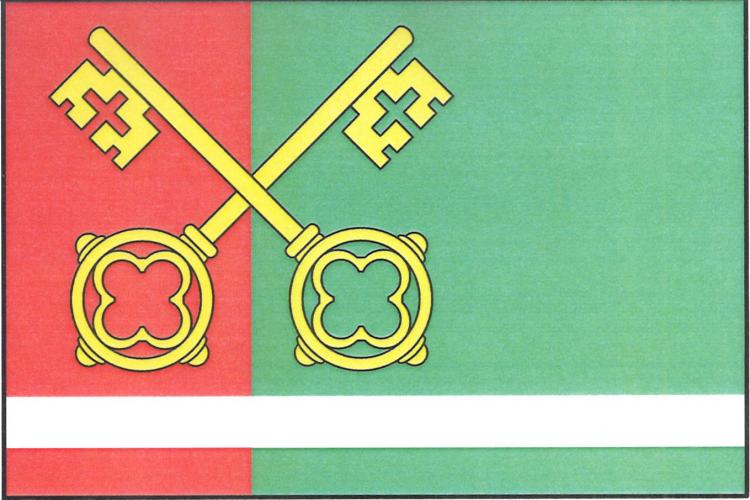
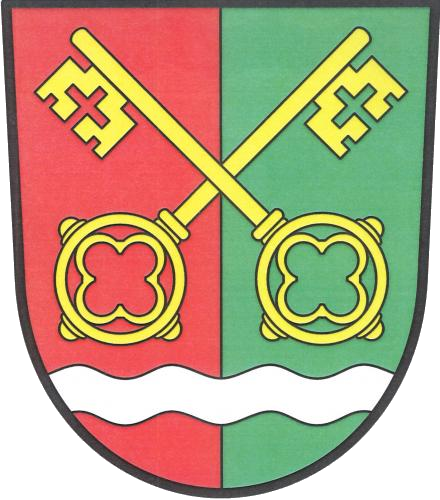
- Flag Coat of arms

- Location in the Czech Republic
- Coordinates: 49°38′43″N 15°13′21″E
- Country: Czech Republic
- Region: Central Bohemian
- District: Benešov
- First mentioned: 1333

Area
  - Total: 6.11 km^{2} (2.36 sq mi)
- Elevation: 440 m (1,440 ft)

Population (2026-01-01)
  - Total: 71
  - Density: 12/km^{2} (30/sq mi)
- Time zone: UTC+1 (CET)
  - Summer (DST): UTC+2 (CEST)
- Postal code: 257 68
- Website: www.setejovice.cz

Šetějovice is a municipality and village in Benešov District in the Central Bohemian Region of the Czech Republic. It has about 70 inhabitants.

== Administrative division ==
Šetějovice consists of three municipal parts (in brackets population according to the 2021 census):

- Šetějovice (26)
- Dolní Rápotice (33)
- Žibřidovice (0)

== Demographics ==
Historical population
Year	Pop.	±%
1869	372	—
1880	380	+2.2%
1890	382	+0.5%
1900	372	−2.6%
1910	376	+1.1%
1921	368	−2.1%
1930	334	−9.2%
1950	259	−22.5%
1961	242	−6.6%
1970	173	−28.5%
1980	99	−42.8%
1991	75	−24.2%
2001	58	−22.7%
2011	69	+19.0%
2021	59	−14.5%
Source: Censuses
