= Chmelná =

- Municipality
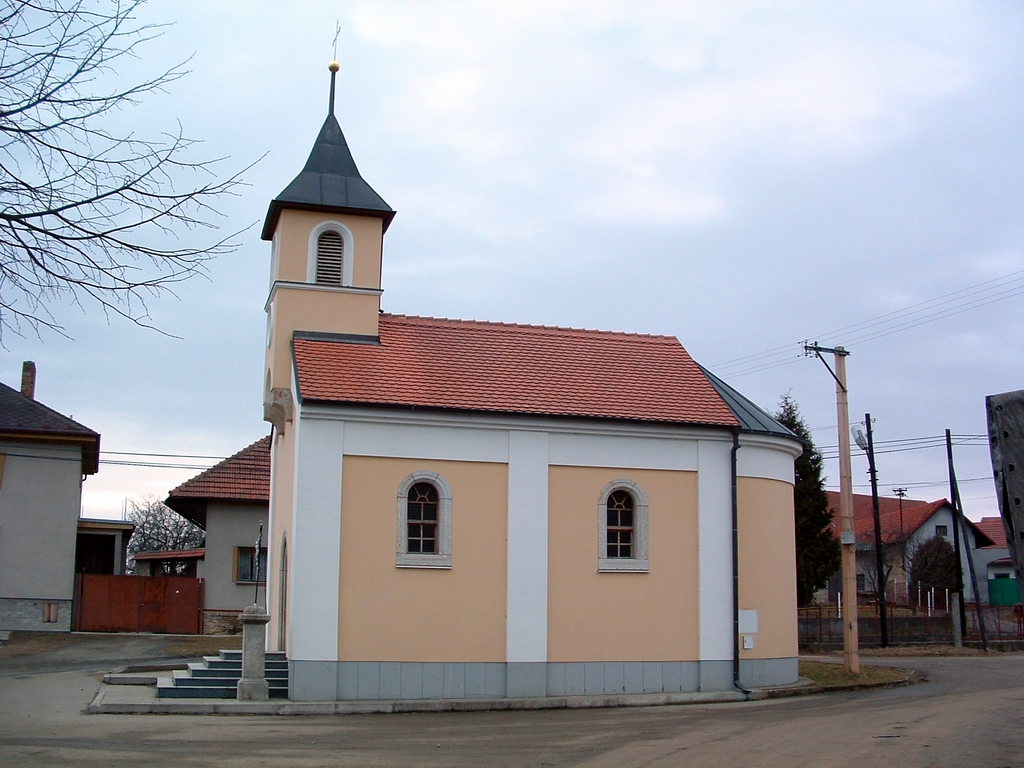
- Chapel of Saint John of Nepomuk

- Location in the Czech Republic
- Coordinates: 49°38′53″N 14°59′18″E
- Country: Czech Republic
- Region: Central Bohemian
- District: Benešov
- First mentioned: 1375

Area
  - Total: 2.40 km^{2} (0.93 sq mi)
- Elevation: 481 m (1,578 ft)

Population (2026-01-01)
  - Total: 164
  - Density: 68.3/km^{2} (177/sq mi)
- Time zone: UTC+1 (CET)
  - Summer (DST): UTC+2 (CEST)
- Postal code: 257 65
- Website: www.chmelna.info

Chmelná is a municipality and village in Benešov District in the Central Bohemian Region of the Czech Republic. It has about 200 inhabitants.

== Etymology ==
The name is derived from the adjective chmelná (derived from 'chmel', i.e. 'hops' in Czech).

== Geography ==
Chmelná is located about 26 kilometres (16 mi) southeast of Benešov and 56 km (35 mi) southeast of Prague. It lies in the Vlašim Uplands. The highest point is at 545 m (1,788 ft) above sea level.

== History ==
The first written mention of Chmelná is from 1375.

== Demographics ==
Historical population

Year	Pop.	±%
1869	204	—
1880	189	−7.4%
1890	176	−6.9%
1900	155	−11.9%
1910	172	+11.0%

Year	Pop.	±%
1921	187	+8.7%
1930	164	−12.3%
1950	118	−28.0%
1961	125	+5.9%
1970	108	−13.6%

Year	Pop.	±%
1980	110	+1.9%
1991	108	−1.8%
2001	110	+1.9%
2011	126	+14.5%
2021	152	+20.6%

Source: Censuses

== Transport ==
There are no railways or major roads passing through the municipality.

== Sights ==
There are no protected cultural monuments in the municipality. The main landmark is the Chapel of Saint John of Nepomuk in the centre of the village, built in 1883.
