= Strojetice =

- Municipality
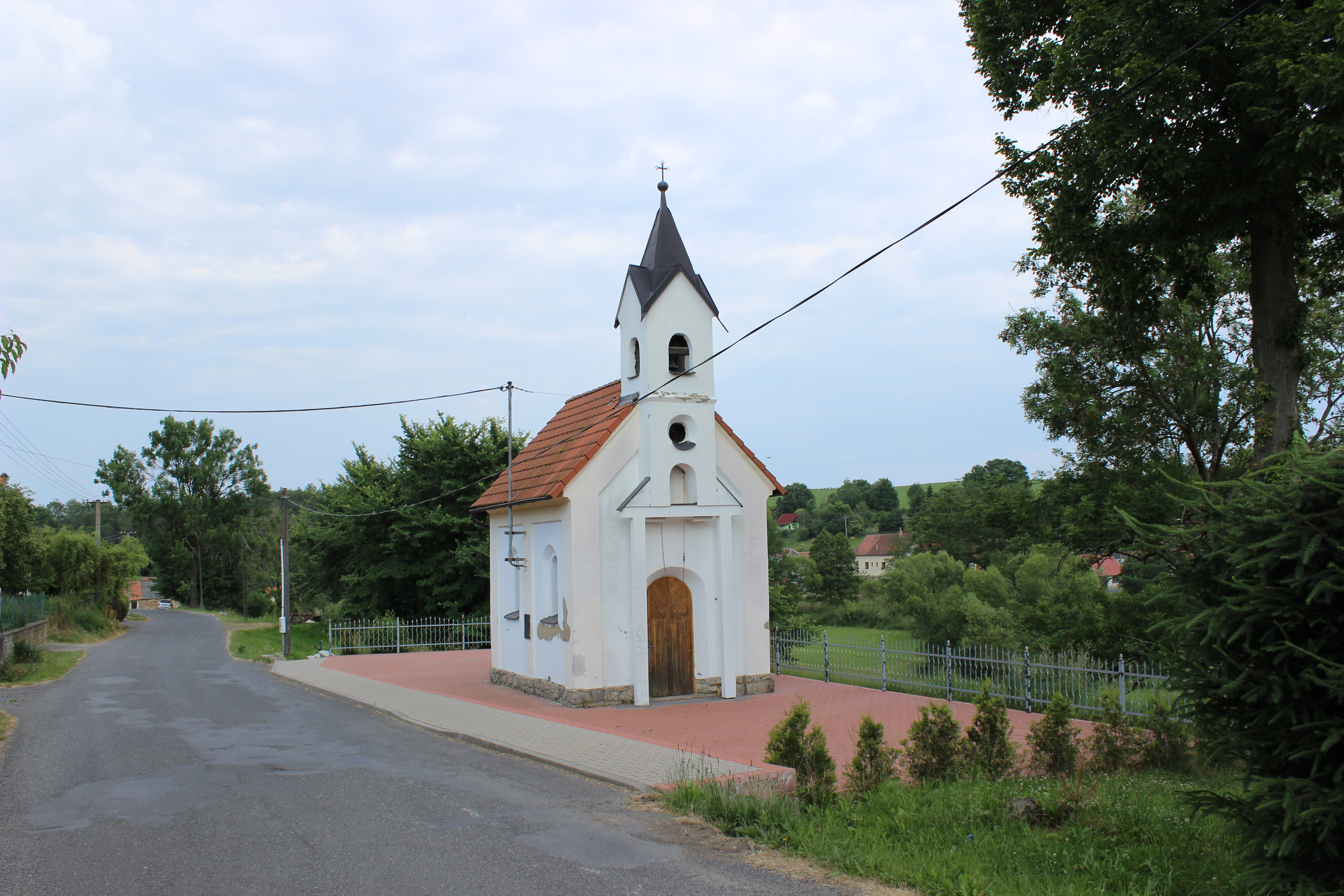
- Chapel in Strojetice

- Location in the Czech Republic
- Coordinates: 49°39′6″N 15°3′58″E
- Country: Czech Republic
- Region: Central Bohemian
- District: Benešov
- First mentioned: 1306

Area
  - Total: 5.02 km^{2} (1.94 sq mi)
- Elevation: 391 m (1,283 ft)

Population (2026-01-01)
  - Total: 145
  - Density: 28.9/km^{2} (74.8/sq mi)
- Time zone: UTC+1 (CET)
  - Summer (DST): UTC+2 (CEST)
- Postal code: 257 65
- Website: strojetice.cz

Strojetice is a municipality and village in Benešov District in the Central Bohemian Region of the Czech Republic. It has about 100 inhabitants.

== History ==
The first written mention of Strojetice is from 1306.

== Demographics ==
Historical population
Year	Pop.	±%
1869	358	—
1880	371	+3.6%
1890	420	+13.2%
1900	427	+1.7%
1910	415	−2.8%
1921	428	+3.1%
1930	411	−4.0%
1950	293	−28.7%
1961	284	−3.1%
1970	226	−20.4%
1980	181	−19.9%
1991	128	−29.3%
2001	127	−0.8%
2011	136	+7.1%
2021	130	−4.4%
Source: Censuses
