= Dunice =

- Municipality
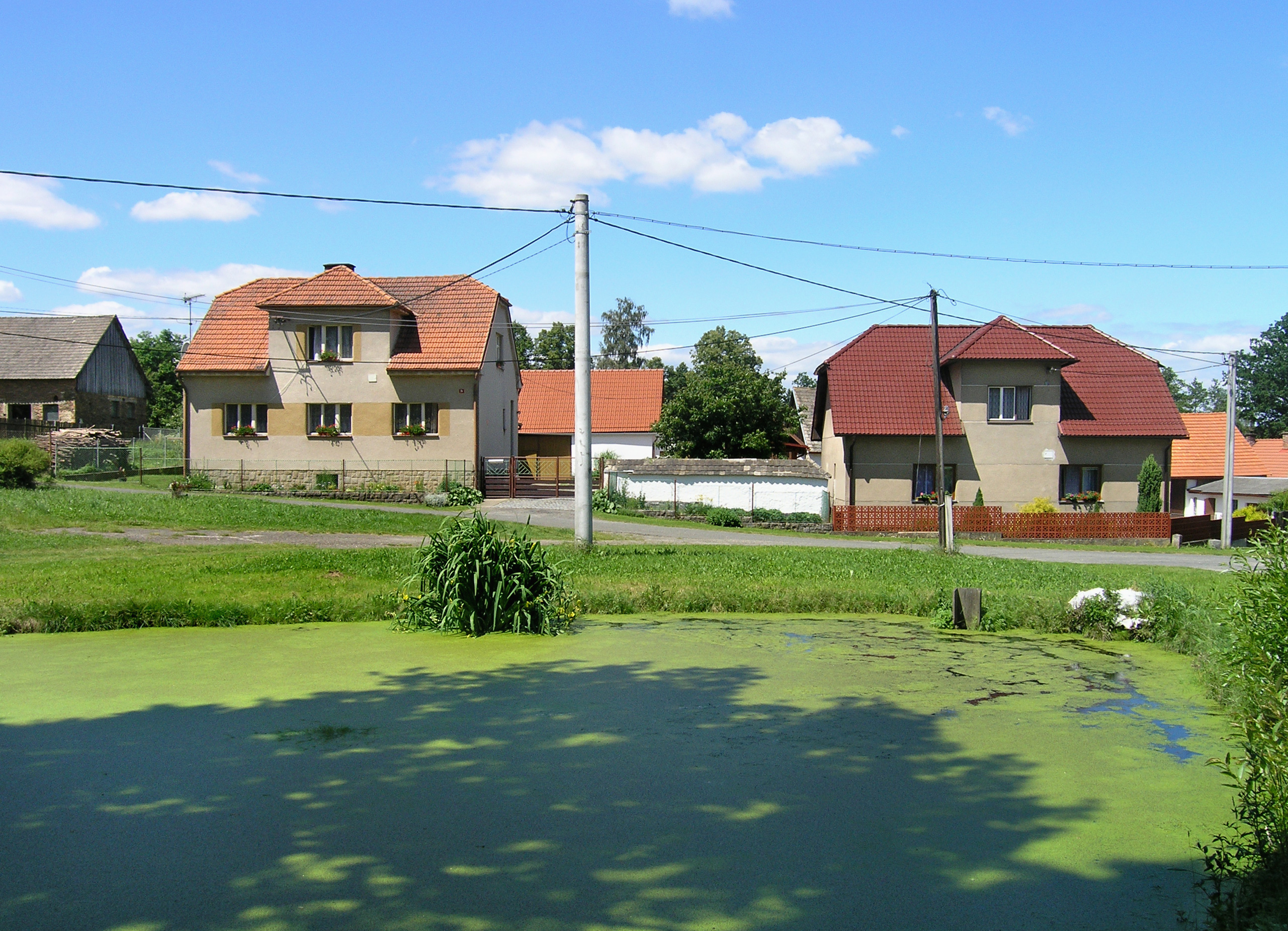
- Eastern part of Dunice

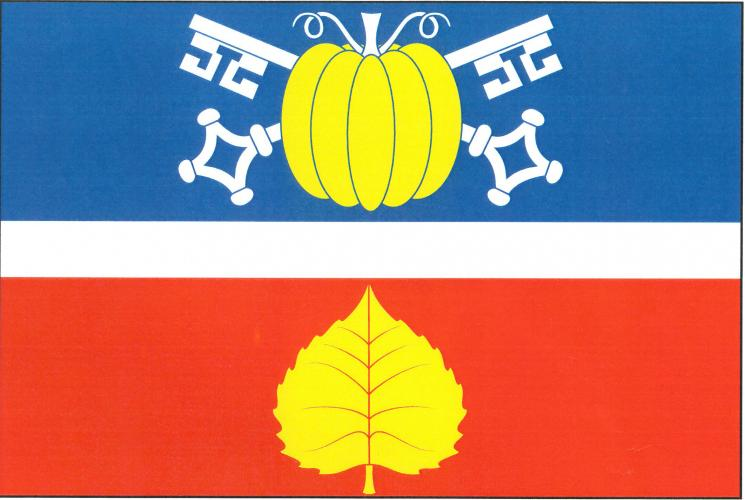
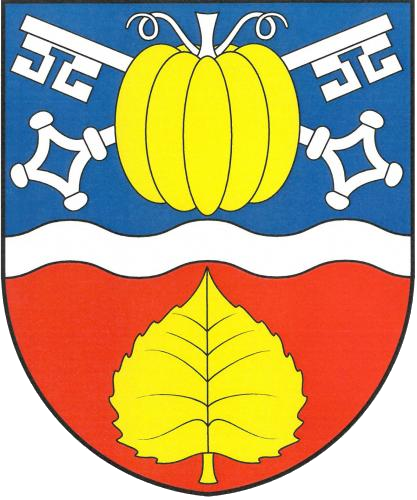
- Flag Coat of arms

- Location in the Czech Republic
- Coordinates: 49°36′12″N 15°9′10″E
- Country: Czech Republic
- Region: Central Bohemian
- District: Benešov
- First mentioned: 1352

Area
  - Total: 3.58 km^{2} (1.38 sq mi)
- Elevation: 454 m (1,490 ft)

Population (2026-01-01)
  - Total: 65
  - Density: 18/km^{2} (47/sq mi)
- Time zone: UTC+1 (CET)
  - Summer (DST): UTC+2 (CEST)
- Postal code: 257 68
- Website: www.dunice.cz

Dunice is a municipality and village in Benešov District in the Central Bohemian Region of the Czech Republic. It has about 70 inhabitants.

== Demographics ==
Historical population
Year	Pop.	±%
1869	223	—
1880	215	−3.6%
1890	201	−6.5%
1900	169	−15.9%
1910	190	+12.4%
1921	174	−8.4%
1930	177	+1.7%
1950	134	−24.3%
1961	145	+8.2%
1970	132	−9.0%
1980	104	−21.2%
1991	84	−19.2%
2001	68	−19.0%
2011	63	−7.4%
2021	59	−6.3%
Source: Censuses
