= Stranný =

- Municipality
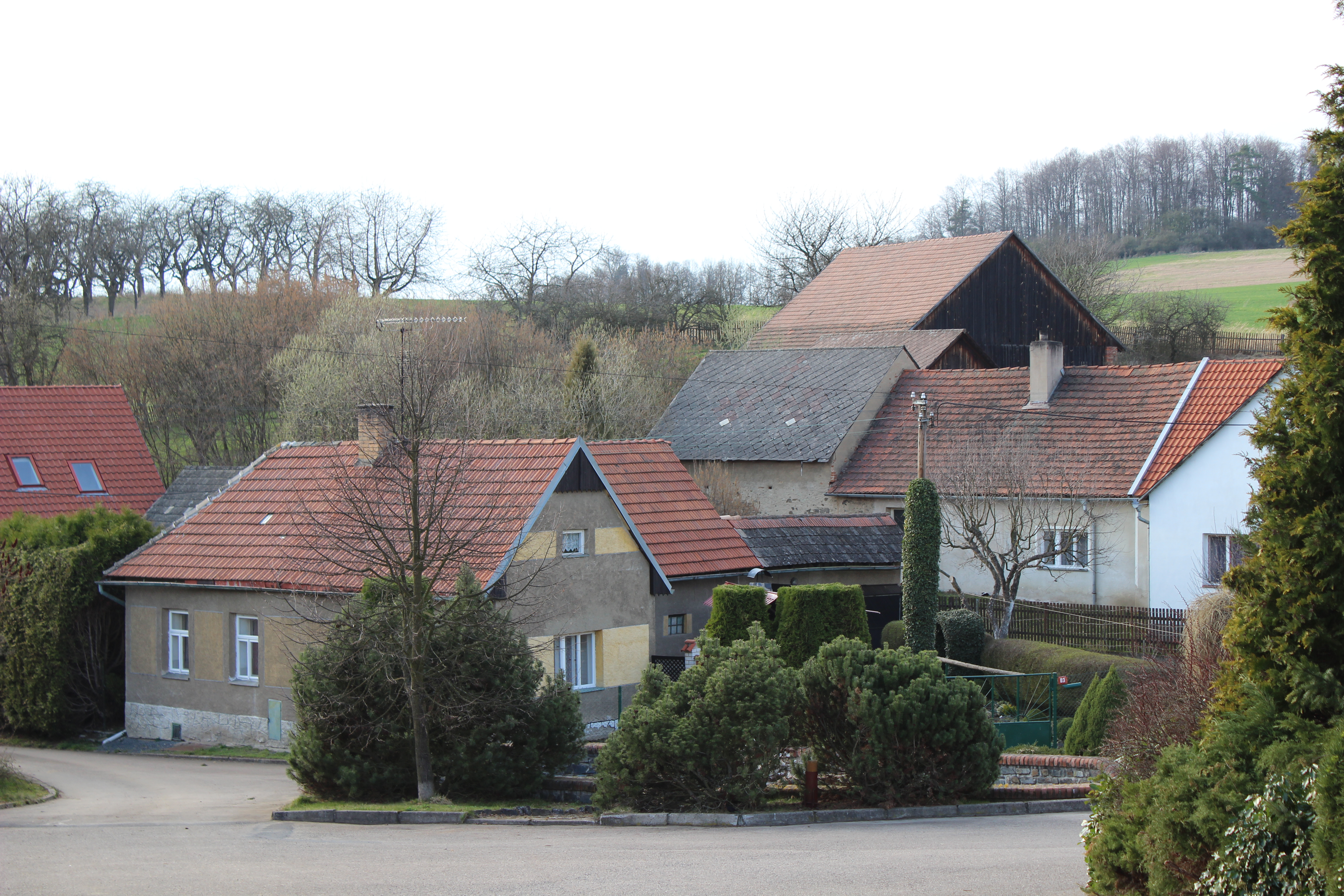
- Houses in Stranný

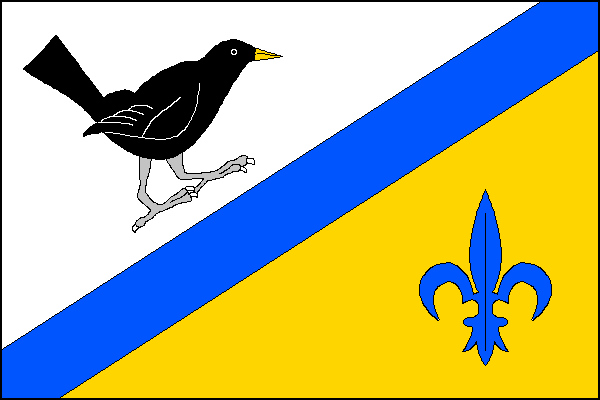
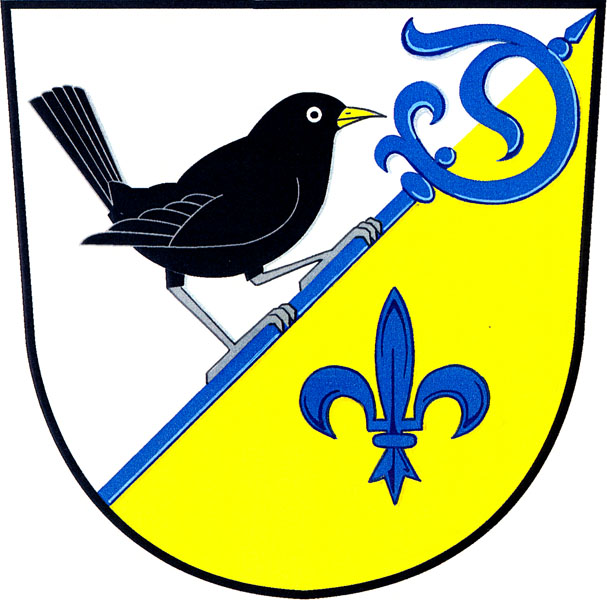
- Flag Coat of arms

- Location in the Czech Republic
- Coordinates: 49°45′14″N 14°29′39″E
- Country: Czech Republic
- Region: Central Bohemian
- District: Benešov
- First mentioned: 1184

Area
  - Total: 5.51 km^{2} (2.13 sq mi)
- Elevation: 443 m (1,453 ft)

Population (2026-01-01)
  - Total: 117
  - Density: 21.2/km^{2} (55.0/sq mi)
- Time zone: UTC+1 (CET)
  - Summer (DST): UTC+2 (CEST)
- Postal code: 257 56
- Website: www.stranny.xf.cz

Stranný is a municipality and village in Benešov District in the Central Bohemian Region of the Czech Republic. It has about 100 inhabitants.

== Administrative division ==
Stranný consists of two municipal parts (in brackets population according to the 2021 census):

- Stranný (95)
- Břevnice (22)

== Demographics ==
Historical population
Year	Pop.	±%
1869	304	—
1880	294	−3.3%
1890	287	−2.4%
1900	302	+5.2%
1910	275	−8.9%
1921	253	−8.0%
1930	235	−7.1%
1950	161	−31.5%
1961	151	−6.2%
1970	145	−4.0%
1980	108	−25.5%
1991	100	−7.4%
2001	116	+16.0%
2011	105	−9.5%
2021	117	+11.4%
Source: Censuses
