= Choratice =

- Municipality
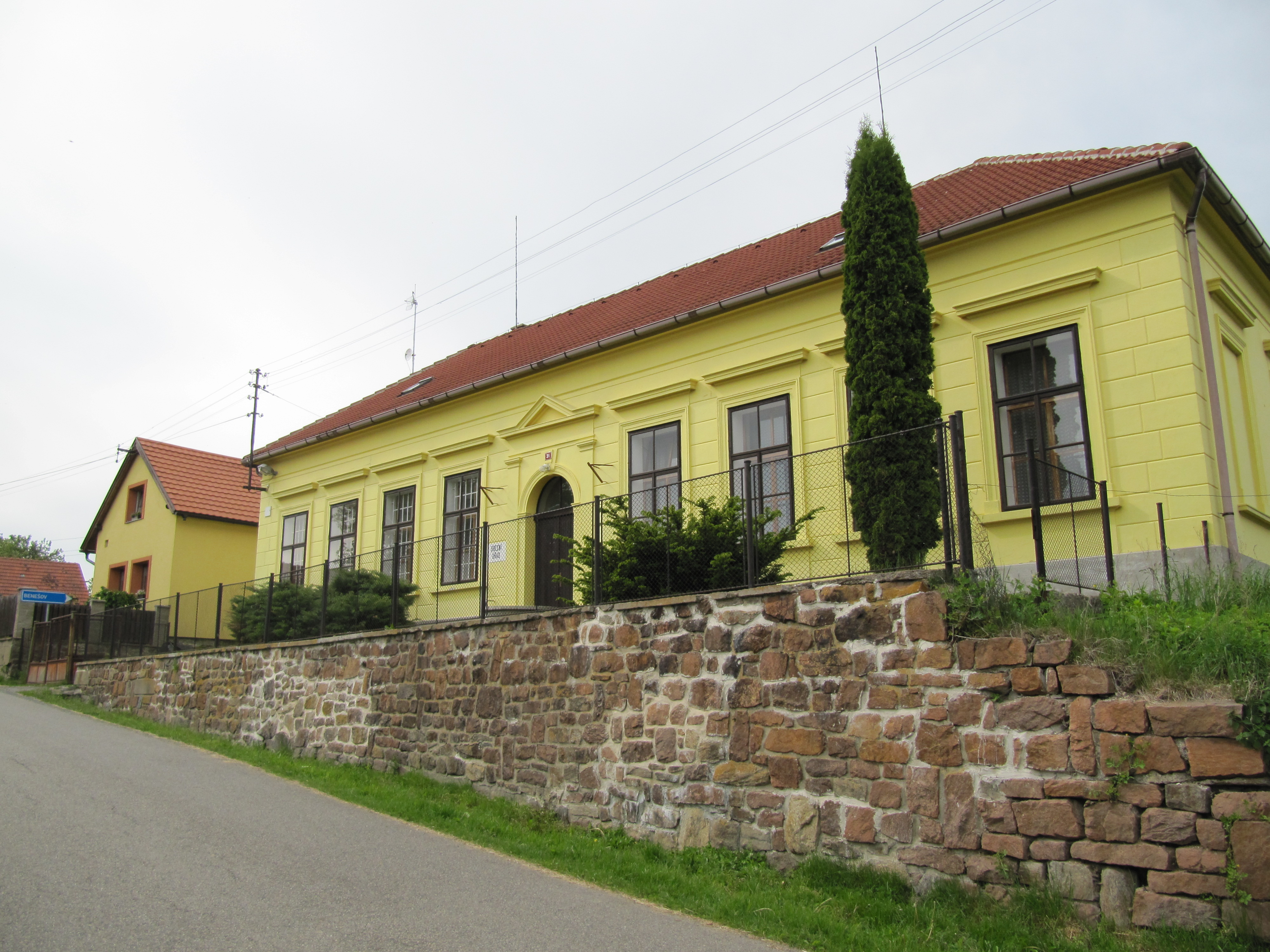
- Municipal office

- Location in the Czech Republic
- Coordinates: 49°50′22″N 14°52′29″E
- Country: Czech Republic
- Region: Central Bohemian
- District: Benešov
- First mentioned: 1205

Area
  - Total: 4.45 km^{2} (1.72 sq mi)
- Elevation: 442 m (1,450 ft)

Population (2026-01-01)
  - Total: 62
  - Density: 14/km^{2} (36/sq mi)
- Time zone: UTC+1 (CET)
  - Summer (DST): UTC+2 (CEST)
- Postal code: 285 06
- Website: www.obecchoratice.cz

Choratice is a municipality and village in Benešov District in the Central Bohemian Region of the Czech Republic. It has about 60 inhabitants.

== Demographics ==
Historical population
Year	Pop.	±%
1869	206	—
1880	225	+9.2%
1890	207	−8.0%
1900	206	−0.5%
1910	204	−1.0%
1921	195	−4.4%
1930	201	+3.1%
1950	126	−37.3%
1961	119	−5.6%
1970	107	−10.1%
1980	76	−29.0%
1991	80	+5.3%
2001	57	−28.7%
2011	76	+33.3%
2021	68	−10.5%
Source: Censuses
