= Kuňovice =

- Municipality
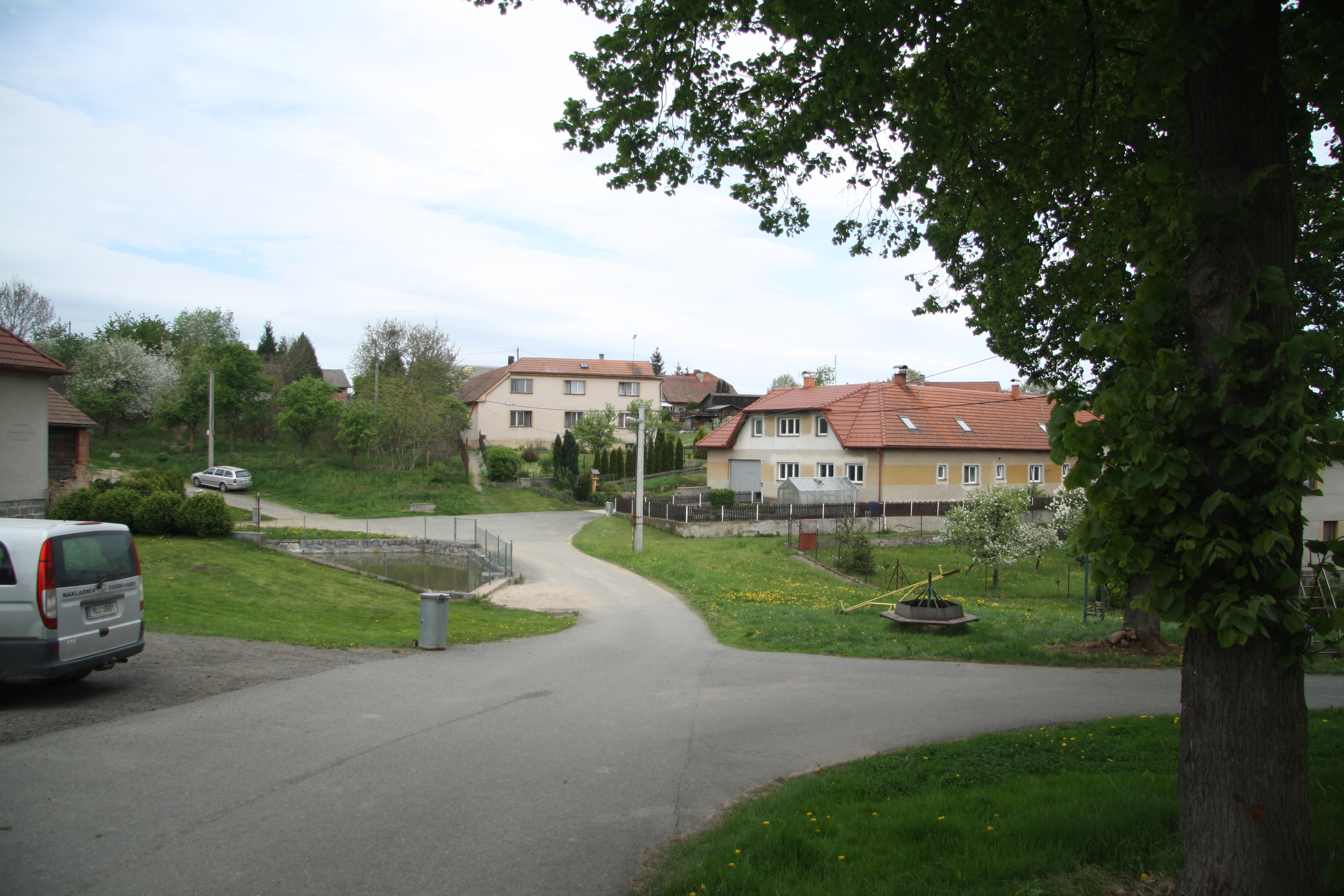
- Centre of Kuňovice

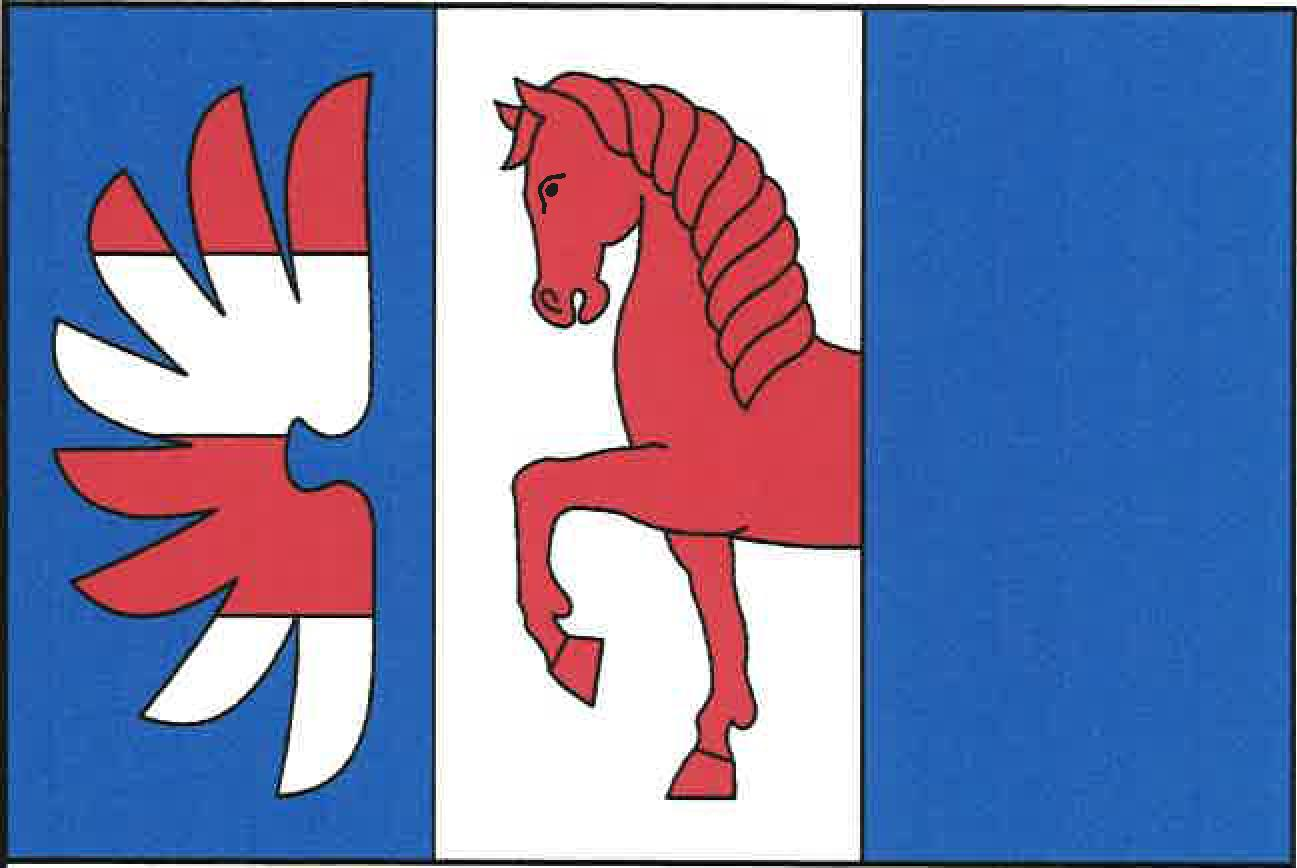
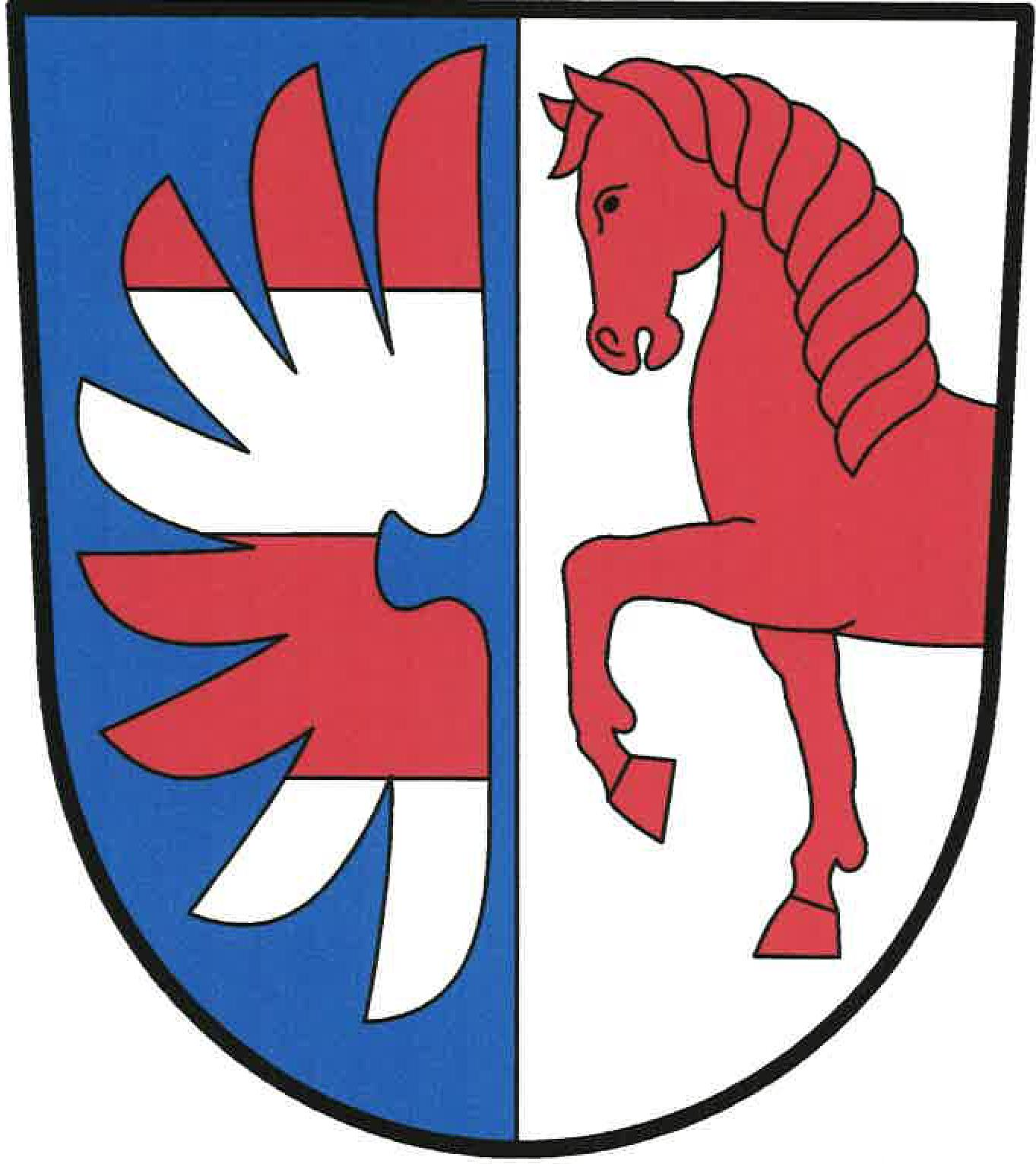
- Flag Coat of arms

- Location in the Czech Republic
- Coordinates: 49°39′30″N 14°59′58″E
- Country: Czech Republic
- Region: Central Bohemian
- District: Benešov
- First mentioned: 1412

Area
  - Total: 3.46 km^{2} (1.34 sq mi)
- Elevation: 492 m (1,614 ft)

Population (2026-01-01)
  - Total: 83
  - Density: 24/km^{2} (62/sq mi)
- Time zone: UTC+1 (CET)
  - Summer (DST): UTC+2 (CEST)
- Postal code: 257 65
- Website: www.obeckunovice.cz

Kuňovice is a municipality and village in Benešov District in the Central Bohemian Region of the Czech Republic. It has about 80 inhabitants.

== Demographics ==
Historical population
Year	Pop.	±%
1869	278	—
1880	229	−17.6%
1890	211	−7.9%
1900	211	+0.0%
1910	207	−1.9%
1921	188	−9.2%
1930	173	−8.0%
1950	130	−24.9%
1961	132	+1.5%
1970	111	−15.9%
1980	99	−10.8%
1991	81	−18.2%
2001	77	−4.9%
2011	89	+15.6%
2021	90	+1.1%
Source: Censuses
