= Mastník (river) =

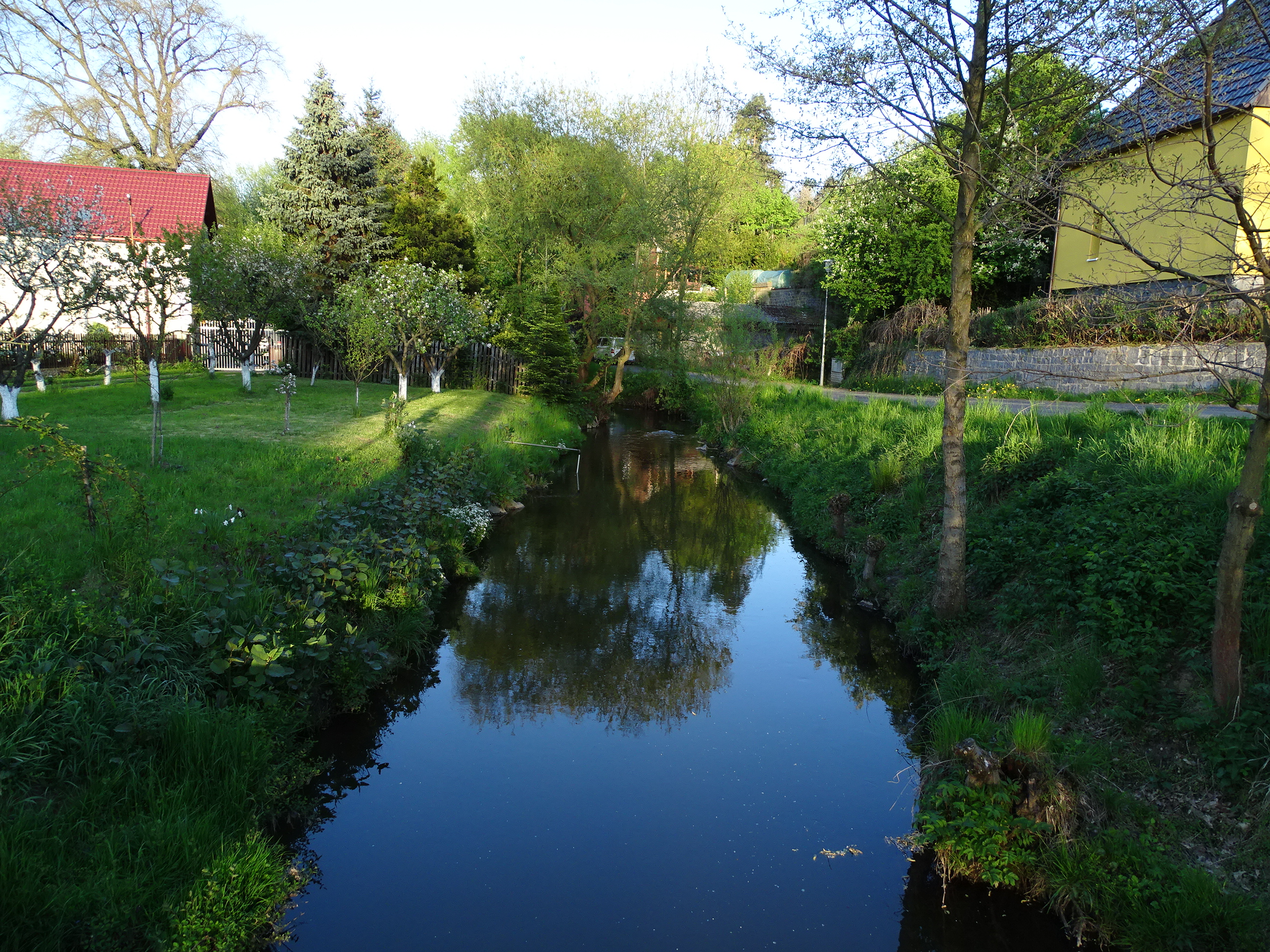
- The Mastník in Sedlčany

Location
- Country: Czech Republic
- Region: Central Bohemian

Physical characteristics
- Source
  - location: Střezimíř, Vlašim Uplands
  - coordinates: 49°32′12″N 14°36′55″E
  - elevation: 598 m (1,962 ft)
- Mouth
  - location: Vltava
  - coordinates: 49°44′51″N 14°24′18″E
  - elevation: 215 m (705 ft)
- Length: 49.5 km (30.8 mi)
- Basin size: 331.5 km^{2} (128.0 sq mi)
- Discharge
  - average: 1.23 m^{3}/s (43 cu ft/s) near estuary

Basin features
- Progression: Vltava→ Elbe→ North Sea

The Mastník (Czech pronunciation: [ˈmastɲiːk]) is a river in the Czech Republic, a right tributary of the Vltava River. It flows through the Central Bohemian Region. It is 49.5 km (30.8 mi) long.

== Characteristic ==
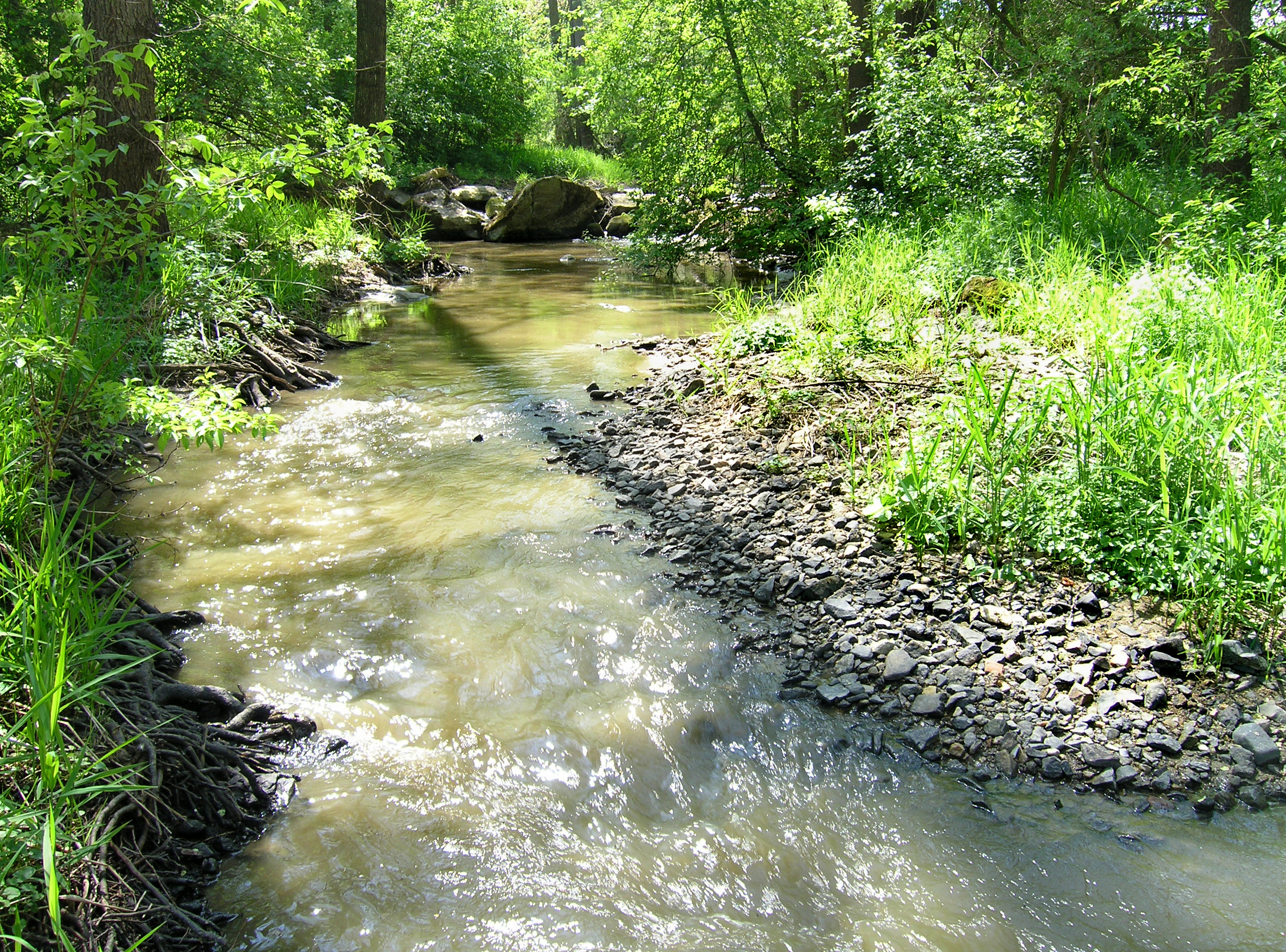
The Mastník in Votice-Bučovice

The Mastník originates in the territory of Střezimíř in the Vlašim Uplands at an elevation of 598 m (1,962 ft), and flows to Radíč, where it enters the Vltava River at an elevation of 215 m (705 ft) in the area of Slapy Reservoir. It is 49.5 km (30.8 mi) long. Its drainage basin has an area of 331.5 km^{2} (128.0 sq mi). The average discharge at its mouth is 1.23 m3/s.

The longest tributaries of the Mastník are:

Tributary	Length (km)	Side
Sedlecký potok	22.3	left
Křečovický potok	13.5	right
Smilkovský potok	7.0	right

== Course ==
The most populous settlement on the river is the town of Sedlčany. The river flows through the municipal territories of Střezimíř, Mezno, Miličín, Červený Újezd, Ješetice, Heřmaničky, Votice, Vojkov, Kosova Hora, Sedlčany, Osečany, Kňovice, Křečovice and Radíč.

== Bodies of water ==
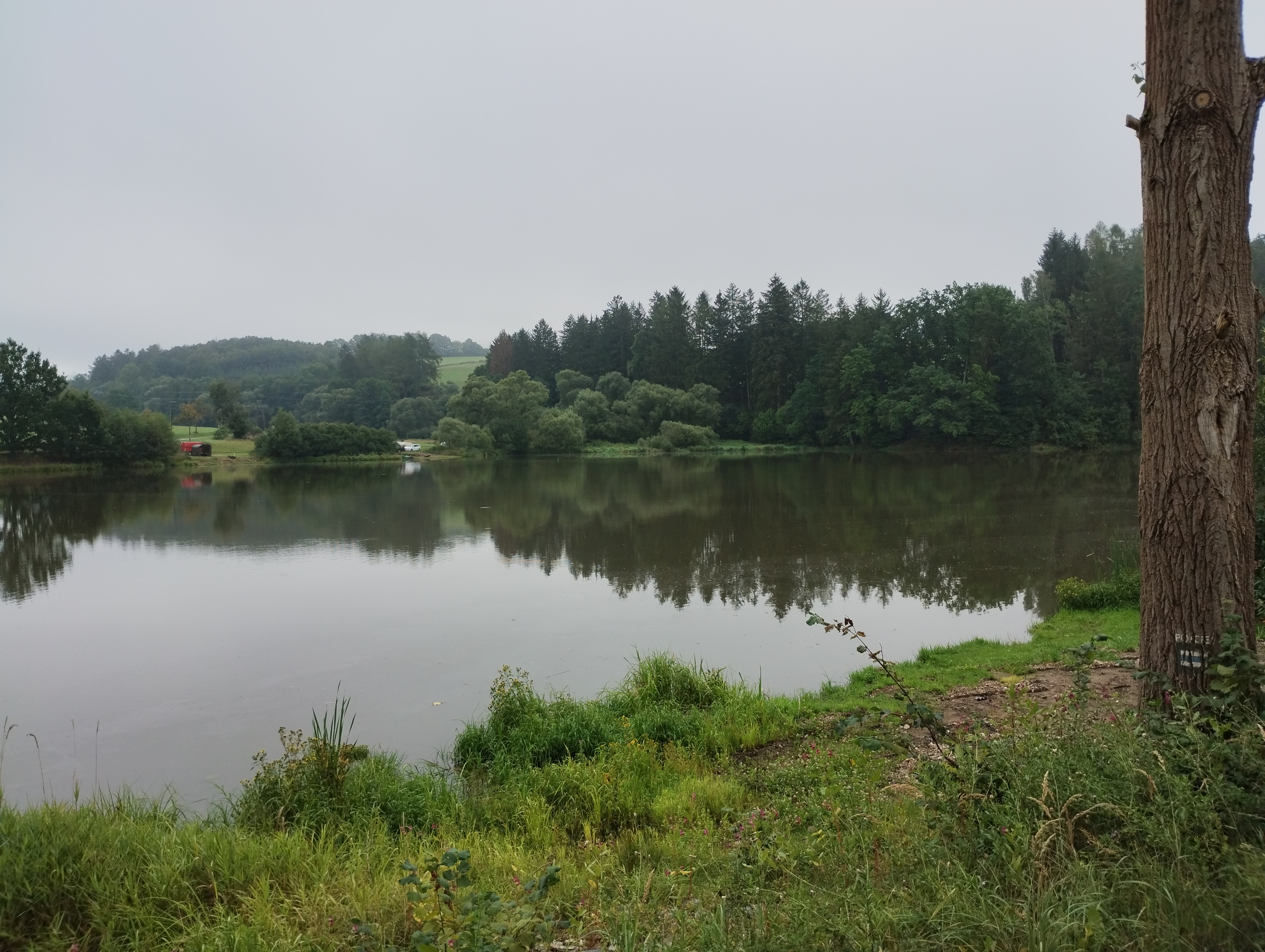
Velký Mastník pond, built on the Mastník

There are 992 bodies of water in the basin area. The largest of them are the fishpond Velký sedlečský rybník with an area of 19.4 ha (48 acres), built on the brook of Vlkonický potok. Several fishponds are built directly on the Mastník. Part of the Slapy Reservoir, which is built on the Vltava, extends into the Mastník estuary.

== Tourism ==
The Mastník is suitable for river tourism, but is navigable only in spring, after heavy rains or when water is released from the fishponds in the basin area.

== See also ==
- List of rivers of the Czech Republic
