= Heřmaničky =

- Municipality
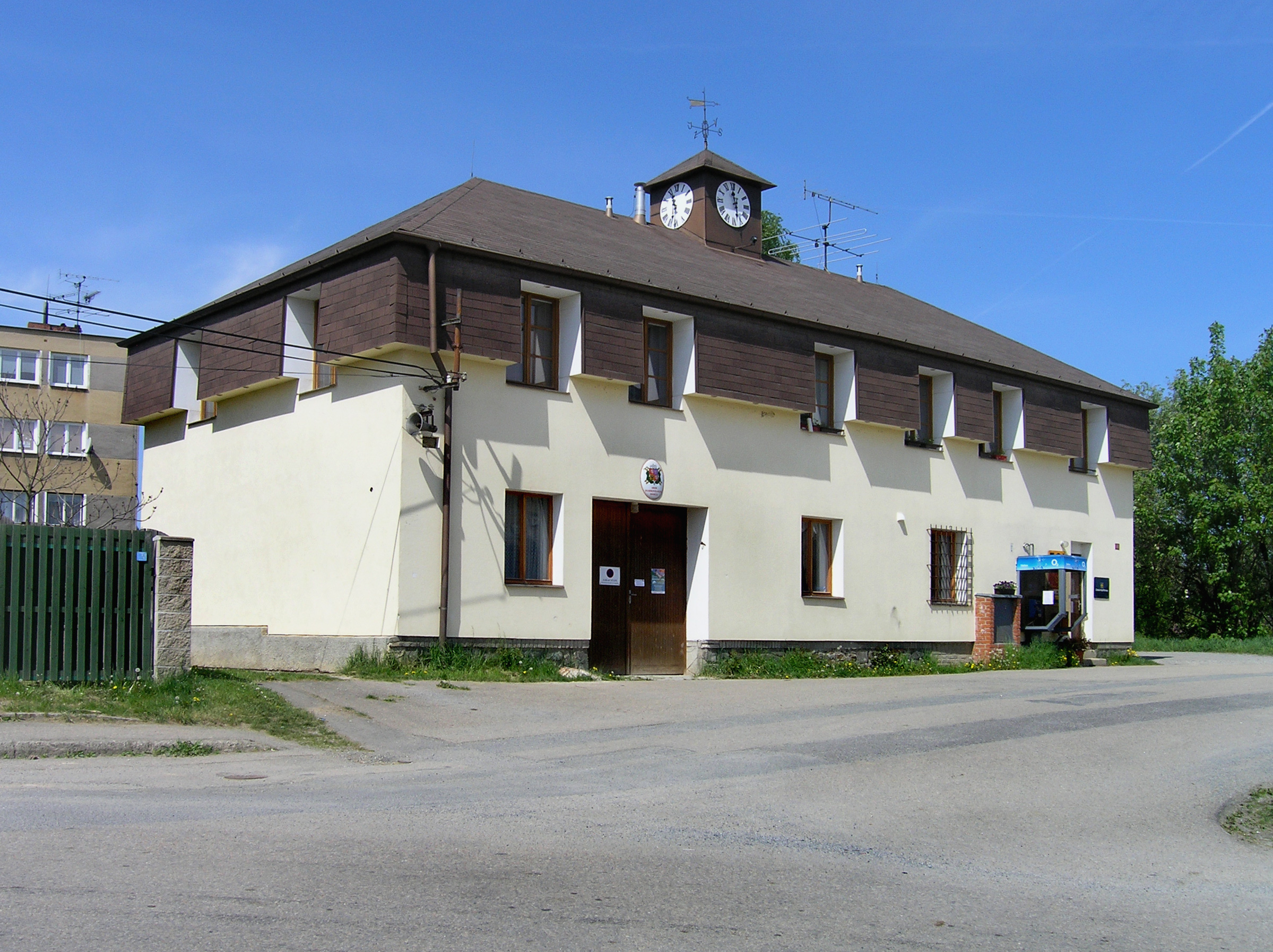
- Firehouse and post office

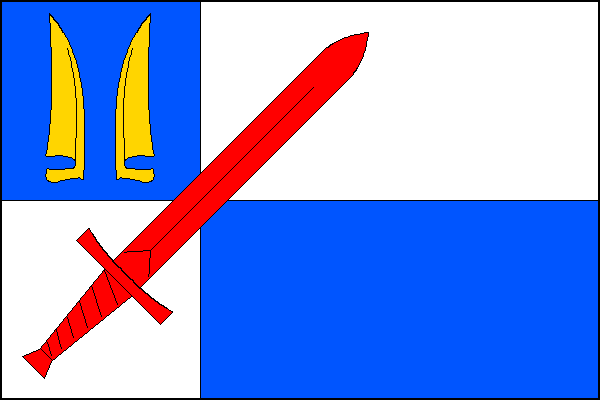
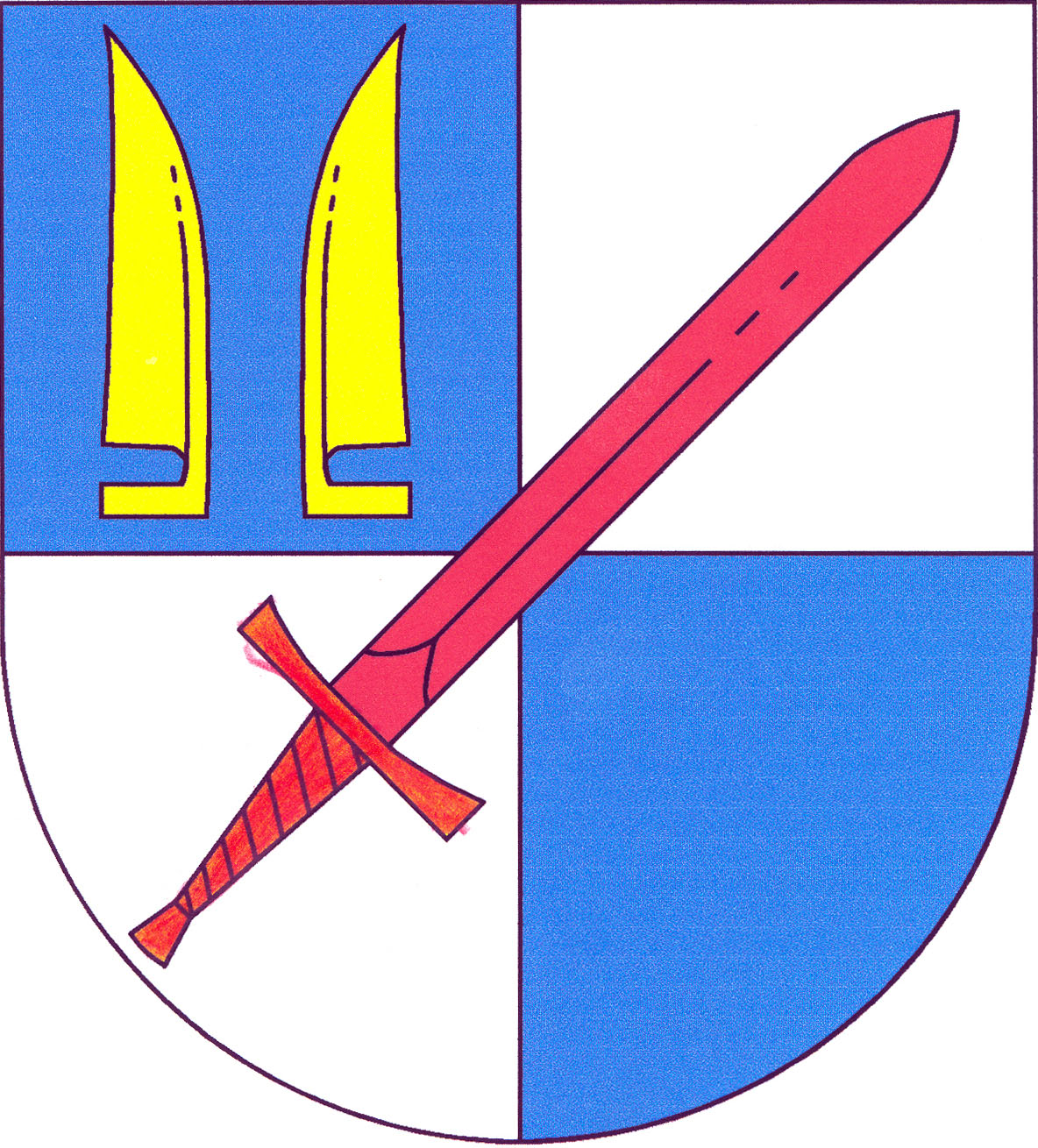
- Flag Coat of arms

- Location in the Czech Republic
- Coordinates: 49°36′19″N 14°34′57″E
- Country: Czech Republic
- Region: Central Bohemian
- District: Benešov
- First mentioned: 1381

Area
  - Total: 17.40 km^{2} (6.72 sq mi)
- Elevation: 505 m (1,657 ft)

Population (2026-01-01)
  - Total: 735
  - Density: 42.2/km^{2} (109/sq mi)
- Time zone: UTC+1 (CET)
  - Summer (DST): UTC+2 (CEST)
- Postal code: 257 89
- Website: www.hermanicky.cz

Heřmaničky is a municipality and village in Benešov District in the Central Bohemian Region of the Czech Republic. It has about 700 inhabitants.

== Administrative division ==
Heřmaničky consists of 13 municipal parts (in brackets population according to the 2021 census):

- Heřmaničky (319)
- Arnoštovice (104)
- Číšťovice (67)
- Dědkov (27)
- Durdice (21)
- Jestřebice (23)
- Jiříkovec (10)
- Jíví (8)
- Karasova Lhota (18)
- Křenovičky (16)
- Loudilka (16)
- Peklo (12)
- Velké Heřmanice (88)

== Etymology ==
Heřmaničky is a diminutive form of Heřmanice (today Velké Heřmanice). The name Heřmanice was derived from the personal name Heřman (a Czech form of Herman), meaning "the village of Heřman's people".

== Geography ==
Heřmaničky is located about 21 kilometres (13 mi) south of Benešov and 49 km (30 mi) south of Prague. It lies in the Vlašim Uplands. The highest point is the hill Vápenka at 593 m (1,946 ft) above sea level. The upper course of the Mastník River flows through the municipality. There are several small fishponds in the municipal territory.

== History ==
The first written mention of Heřmaničky is from 1381. The oldest settlement is Arnoštovice, first mentioned in 1352. Other villages located in the territory of today's municipality appeared in written records in the following decades, with the exception of Loudilka, which was founded in 1788. Until the establishment of a sovereign municipality in the middle of the 19th century, all the villages belonged to the Smilkov estate, with the exception of Jestřebice, which belonged to the Votice estate.

== Demographics ==
Historical population

Year	Pop.	±%
1869	1,575	—
1880	1,378	−12.5%
1890	1,259	−8.6%
1900	1,212	−3.7%
1910	1,192	−1.7%

Year	Pop.	±%
1921	1,293	+8.5%
1930	1,284	−0.7%
1950	1,060	−17.4%
1961	1,029	−2.9%
1970	913	−11.3%

Year	Pop.	±%
1980	803	−12.0%
1991	725	−9.7%
2001	668	−7.9%
2011	712	+6.6%
2021	729	+2.4%

Source: Censuses

== Transport ==
Heřmaničky is located on the railway line Tábor–Olbramovice.

== Sights ==
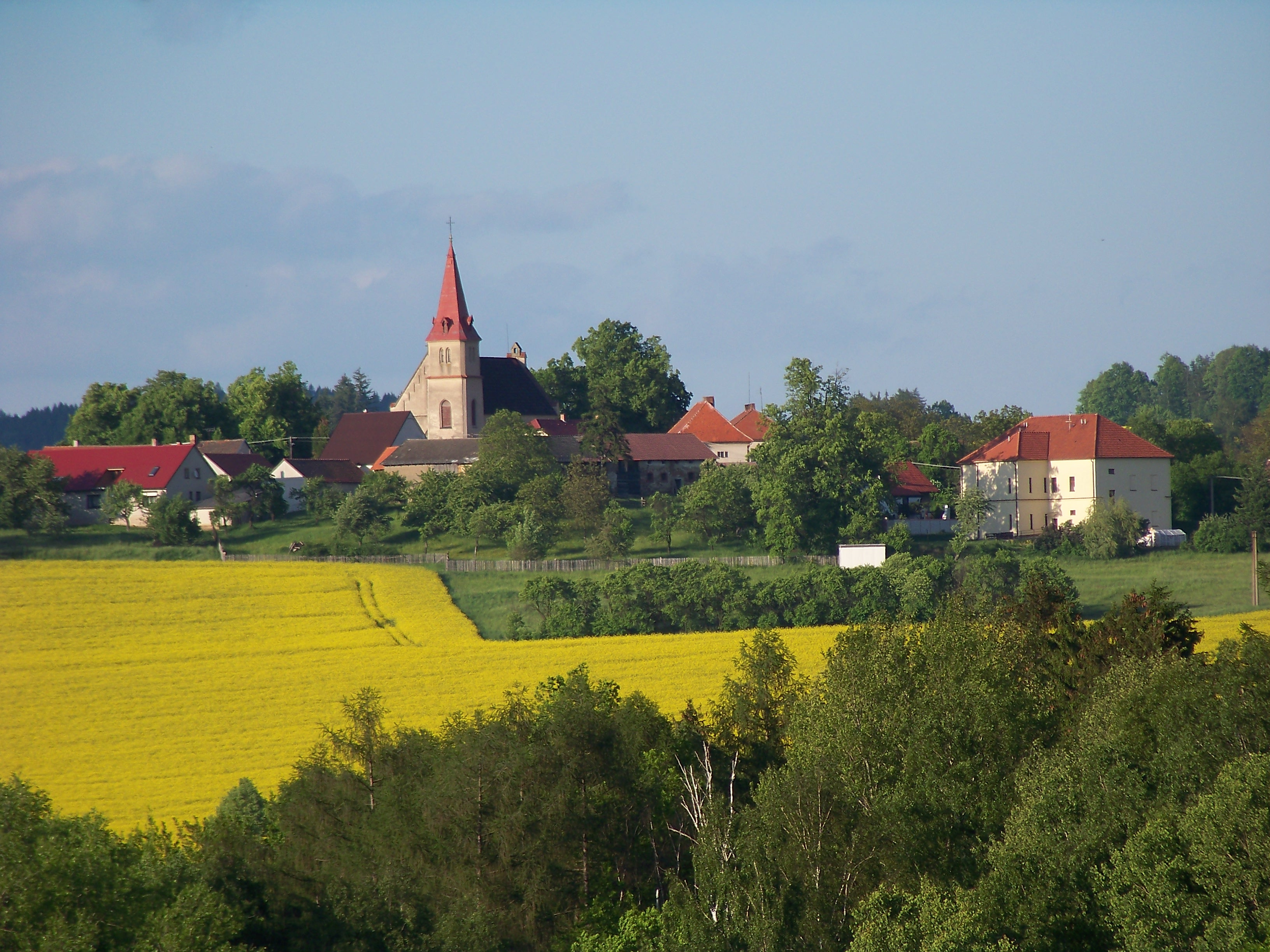
View of Arnoštovice from the southwest

The main landmark is the Church of Saints Simon and Jude, located in Arnoštovice. It was built in the Gothic style in the third quarter of the 13th century. In 1732, the tower and sacristy were added to the church. In 1892, the church was modified into its present form.
