= Sedlčany =

- Town
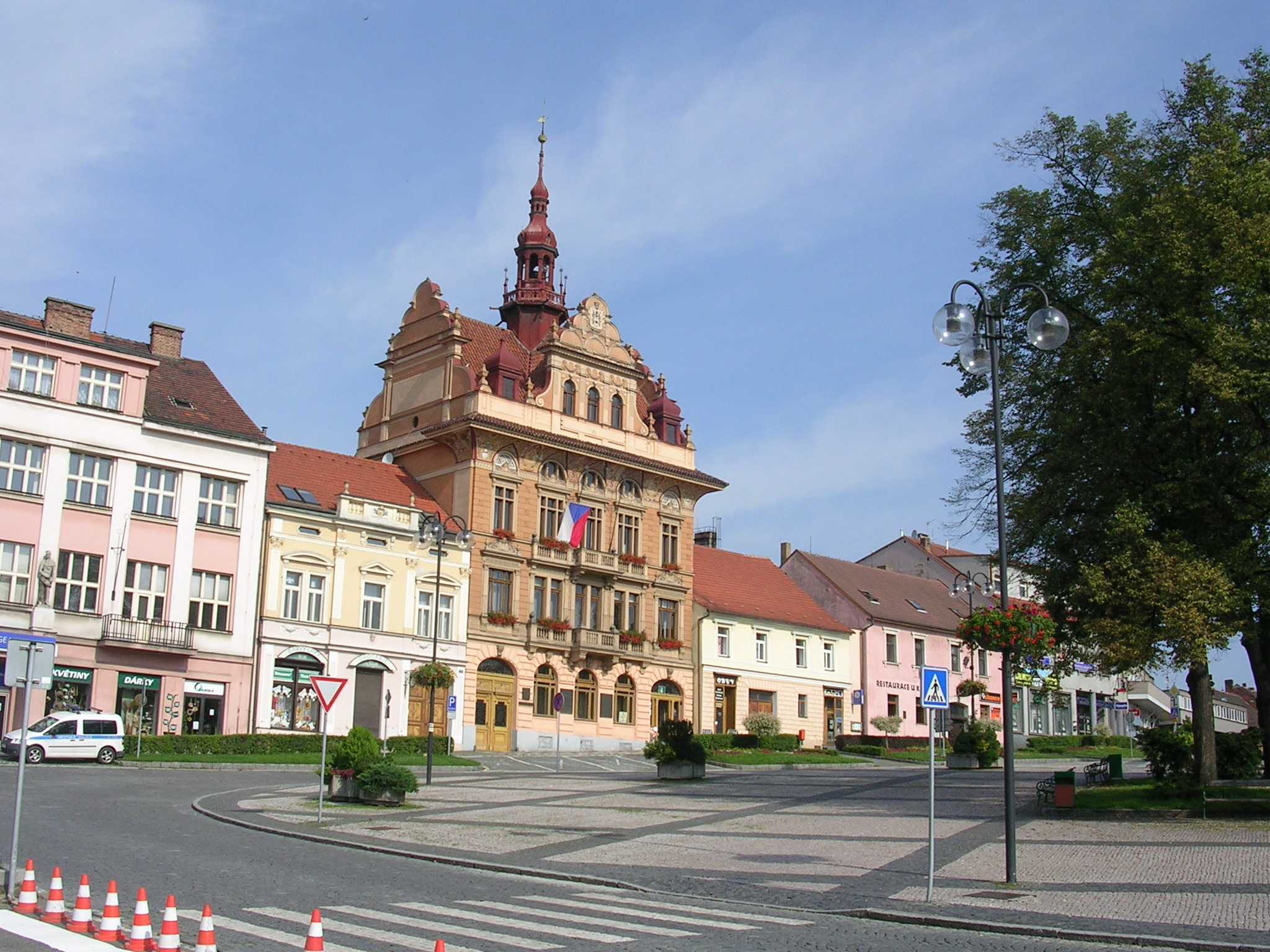
- Náměstí T. G. Masaryka and the town hall

- Coat of arms

- Location in the Czech Republic
- Coordinates: 49°39′38″N 14°25′36″E
- Country: Czech Republic
- Region: Central Bohemian
- District: Příbram
- First mentioned: 1294

Government
  - Mayor: Ivan Janeček

Area
  - Total: 36.47 km^{2} (14.08 sq mi)
- Elevation: 321 m (1,053 ft)

Population (2026-01-01)
  - Total: 6,784
  - Density: 186.0/km^{2} (481.8/sq mi)
- Time zone: UTC+1 (CET)
  - Summer (DST): UTC+2 (CEST)
- Postal code: 264 01
- Website: www.mesto-sedlcany.cz

Sedlčany (Czech pronunciation: [ˈsɛdl̩tʃanɪ]; German: Seltschan) is a town in Příbram District in the Central Bohemian Region of the Czech Republic. It has about 6,800 inhabitants. It is located on the Mastník River in the Benešov Uplands. The most important monument is the Church of Saint Martin, built in the Romanesque-Gothic style.

== Administrative division ==
Sedlčany consists of ten municipal parts (in brackets population according to the 2021 census):

- Sedlčany (6,131)
- Doubravice (35)
- Hradišťko (16)
- Libíň (105)
- Oříkov (80)
- Sestrouň (69)
- Solopysky (204)
- Třebnice (120)
- Vítěž (24)
- Zberaz (89)

== Etymology ==
The name is derived from the word sedlčan, which denoted a person who moved from Sedlec.

== Geography ==
Sedlčany is located about 30 kilometres (19 mi) east of Příbram and 38 km (24 mi) south of Prague. It lies in the Benešov Uplands. The highest point is a hill at 519 m (1,703 ft) above sea level. The town is situated at the confluence of the Mastník River and the stream Sedlecký potok. The Sedlčany Retention Reservoir is built on the Sedlecký potok.

== History ==
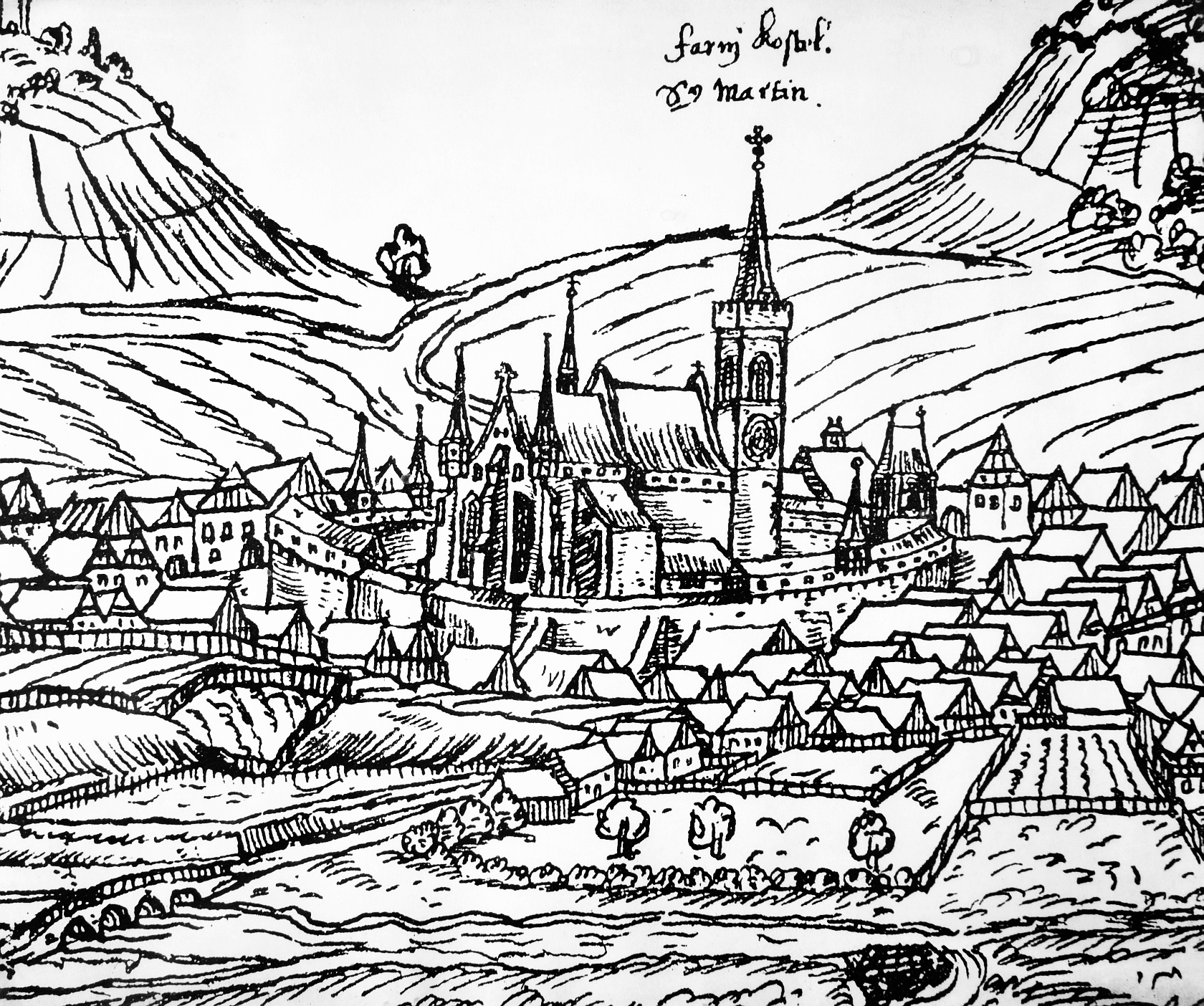
Sedlčany with the Church of Saint Martin (1602 woodcut)

The first written mention of Sedlčany is from 1294, when Sedlčany already held market rights. Then held by the Lords of Hradec, the estates were given in pawn to the Rosenberg family by King John of Bohemia in 1337. The citizens joined the Hussite movement as vassals of Oldřich II of Rosenberg and during the Hussite Wars the town temporarily was controlled by radical Taborites. Thanks to Oldřich II of Rosenberg, Sedlčany gained town privileges in 1418.

In 1475, Sedlčany was acquired by the Lobkowicz family, but the Rosenbergs soon regained it. In the 16th century, the town became known for its production of quality cloth and brewing beer, and became a cultural centre. In 1580, Jakub Krčín acquired the town from William of Rosenberg, when they exchanged some properties. Upon his death in 1604, the last Rosenberg scion Peter Vok sold Sedlčany to the Bohemian chancellor Zdeněk Vojtěch Popel of Lobkowicz. The Lobkowicz family annexed Sedlčany to their Vysoký Chlumec estate. The town was devastated by the Swedish troops during the Thirty Years' War and did not recover until the mid-19th century.

In 1943, Sedlčany was displaced and transformed into a military barracks for SS units within the SS-Truppenübungsplatz Böhmen. The surrounding area became a training ground with a military shooting range.

== Demographics ==
Historical population

Year	Pop.	±%
1869	4,428	—
1880	4,492	+1.4%
1890	4,572	+1.8%
1900	4,583	+0.2%
1910	4,351	−5.1%

Year	Pop.	±%
1921	4,330	−0.5%
1930	4,108	−5.1%
1950	3,713	−9.6%
1961	4,466	+20.3%
1970	5,462	+22.3%

Year	Pop.	±%
1980	7,585	+38.9%
1991	7,959	+4.9%
2001	7,846	−1.4%
2011	7,497	−4.4%
2021	6,873	−8.3%

Source: Censuses

== Economy ==
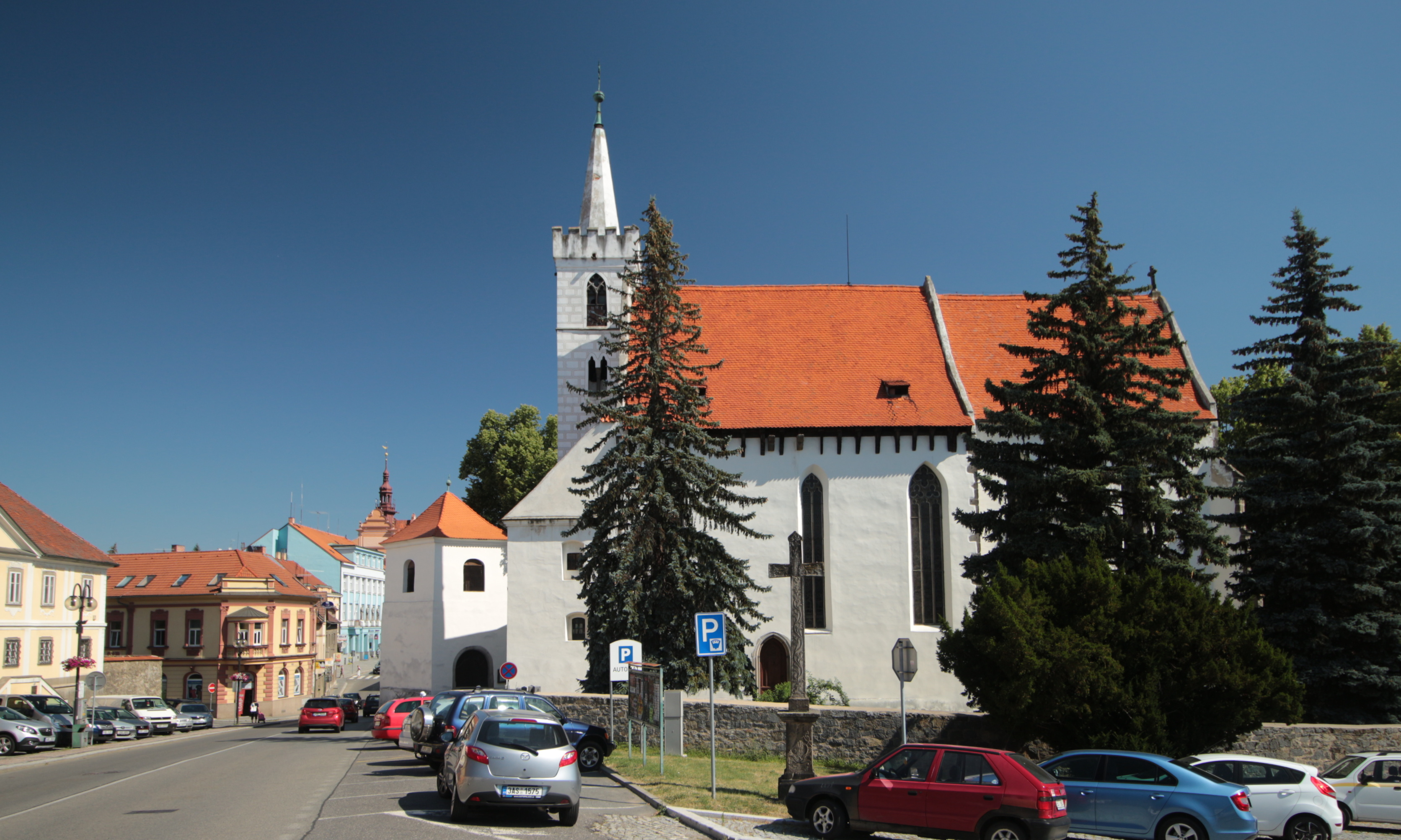
Church of Saint Martin

For many decades, Sedlčany was famous for its production of Hermelín cheese. However, the production was moved by the dairy's owner from Sedlčany to Přibyslav in 2019. The Sedlčanský hermelín brand name, however, remained.

== Transport ==
The I/18 road (the section from Příbram to Votice) runs through the town.

Sedlčany is the terminus of a railway line from Benešov.

== Sights ==
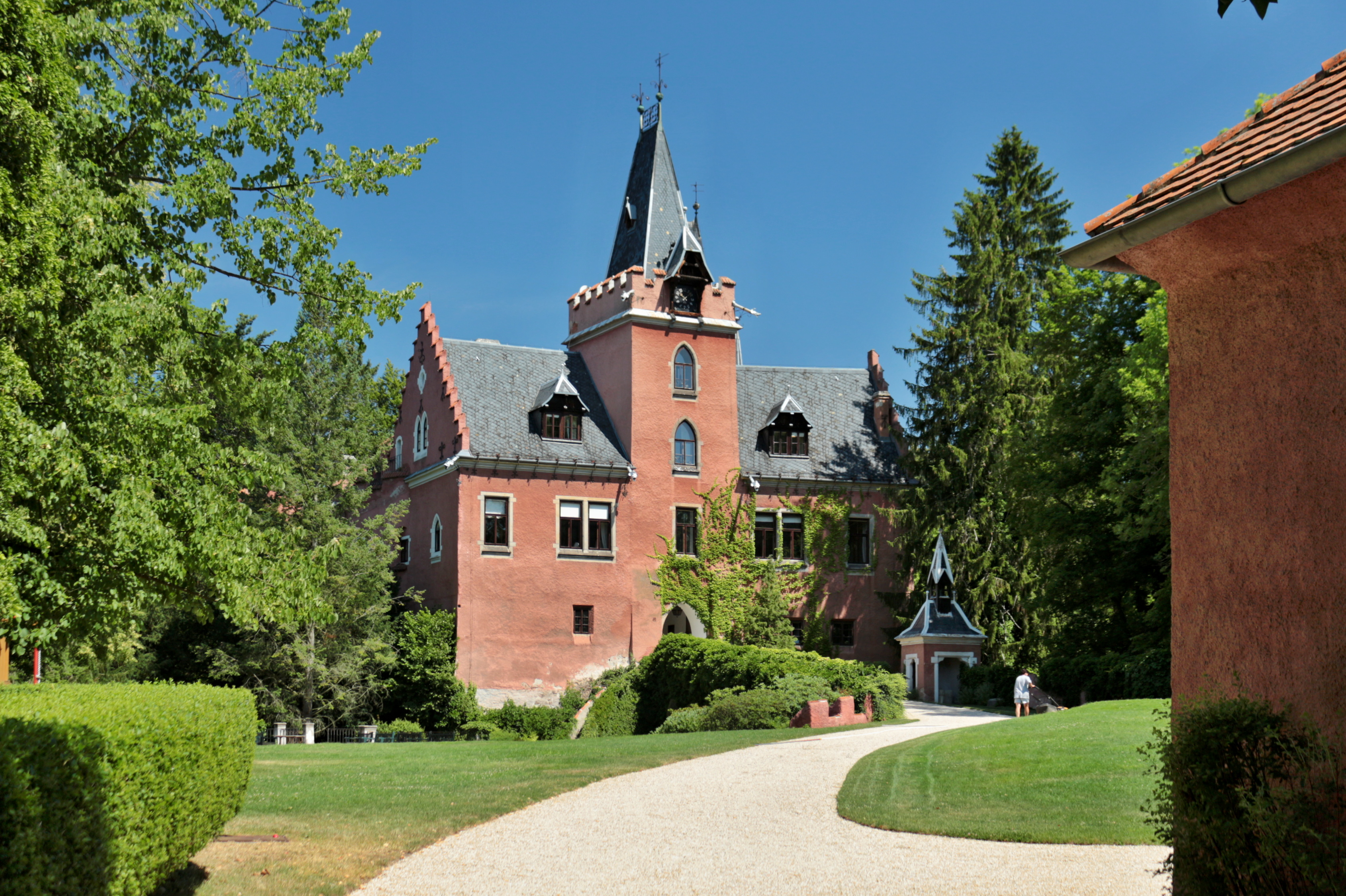
Červený Hrádek Castle

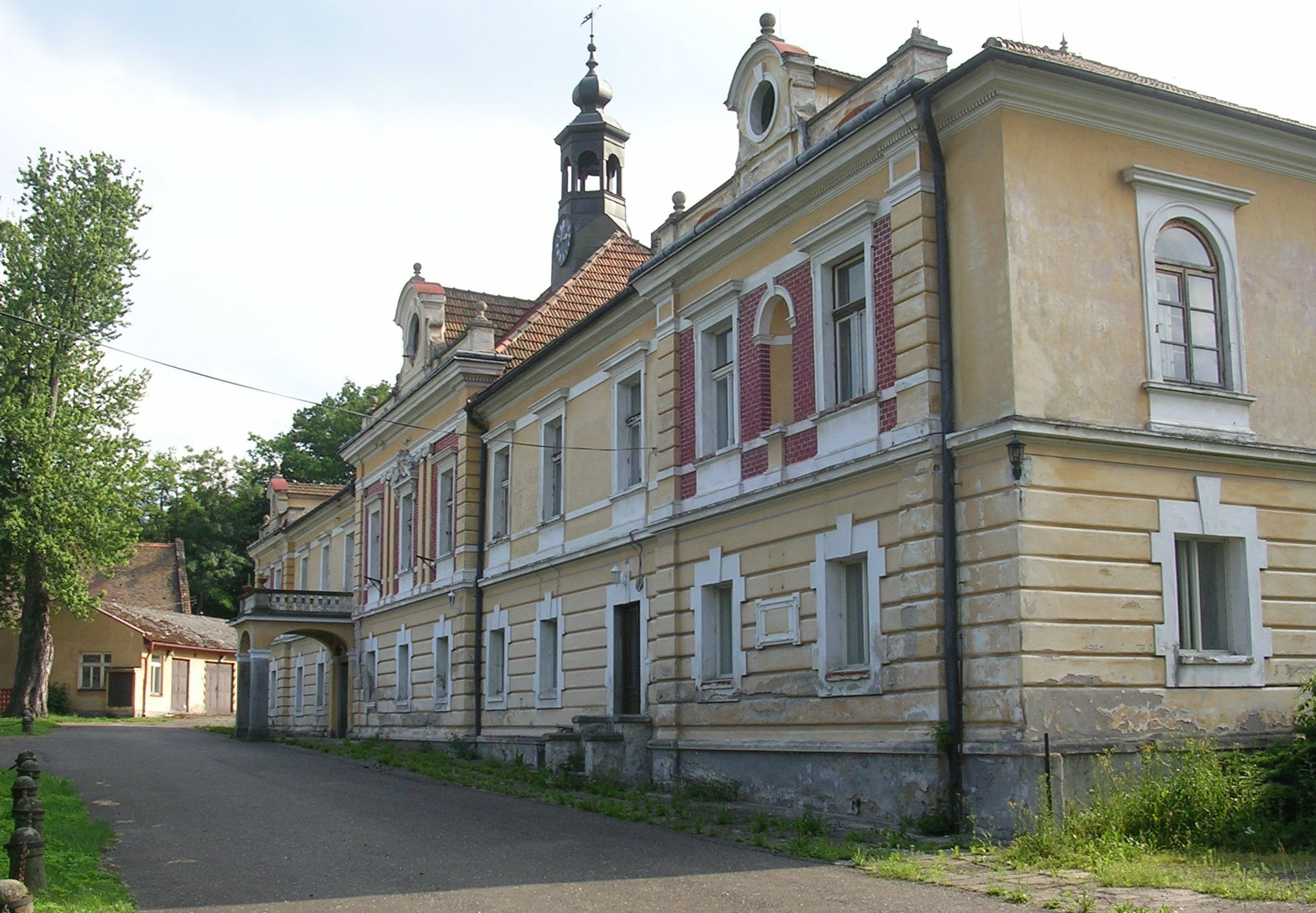
Třebnice Castle

The main landmark of Sedlčany and the oldest building is the Church of Saint Martin. The original Romanesque church, which was as old as the town, was completely rebuilt in the Gothic style in 1374. A tower with Romanesque-Gothic windows has been preserved from the original church. The building was originally fortified. A free-standing Renaissance bell tower belongs to the church. The interior decoration includes an extensive fresco of the Adoration of the Three Kings.

The Church of the Assumption of the Virgin Mary is situated in the northern part of the town. It was built in the early Baroque style in 1732–1735.

The Červený Hrádek Castle has a Gothic core from the turn of the 13th and 14th centuries. The castle was rebuilt in the late Gothic and Baroque styles. Its present form is a result of the neo-Gothic modification in 1894–1895 according to the architect Jan Kotěra. The castle is occasionally open for cultural events. Next to the castle is a freely accessible park.

The Třebnice Castle is located in the village of Třebnice. It was originally a medieval fortress, rebuilt in the Baroque and Neo-Renaissance styles. It is known as the birthplace of Joseph Radetzky von Radetz. It was originally a large castle complex with a park, but as a result of insensitive changes in the 1970s, when the castle was used as a forestry school, the castle remained detached from the other buildings and the park was devalued. Today, the castle building is unused.

== Notable people ==
- Joseph Radetzky von Radetz (1766–1858), field marshal
- Karel Baxa (1863–1938), mayor of Prague
- Jindřiška Flajšhansová (1868–1931), writer and women's rights activist
- Helena Šrámková (1883–1974), painter

== Twin towns – sister cities ==
Sedlčany is twinned with:

- Taverny, France
- Wągrowiec County, Poland
