= Střezimíř =

- Municipality
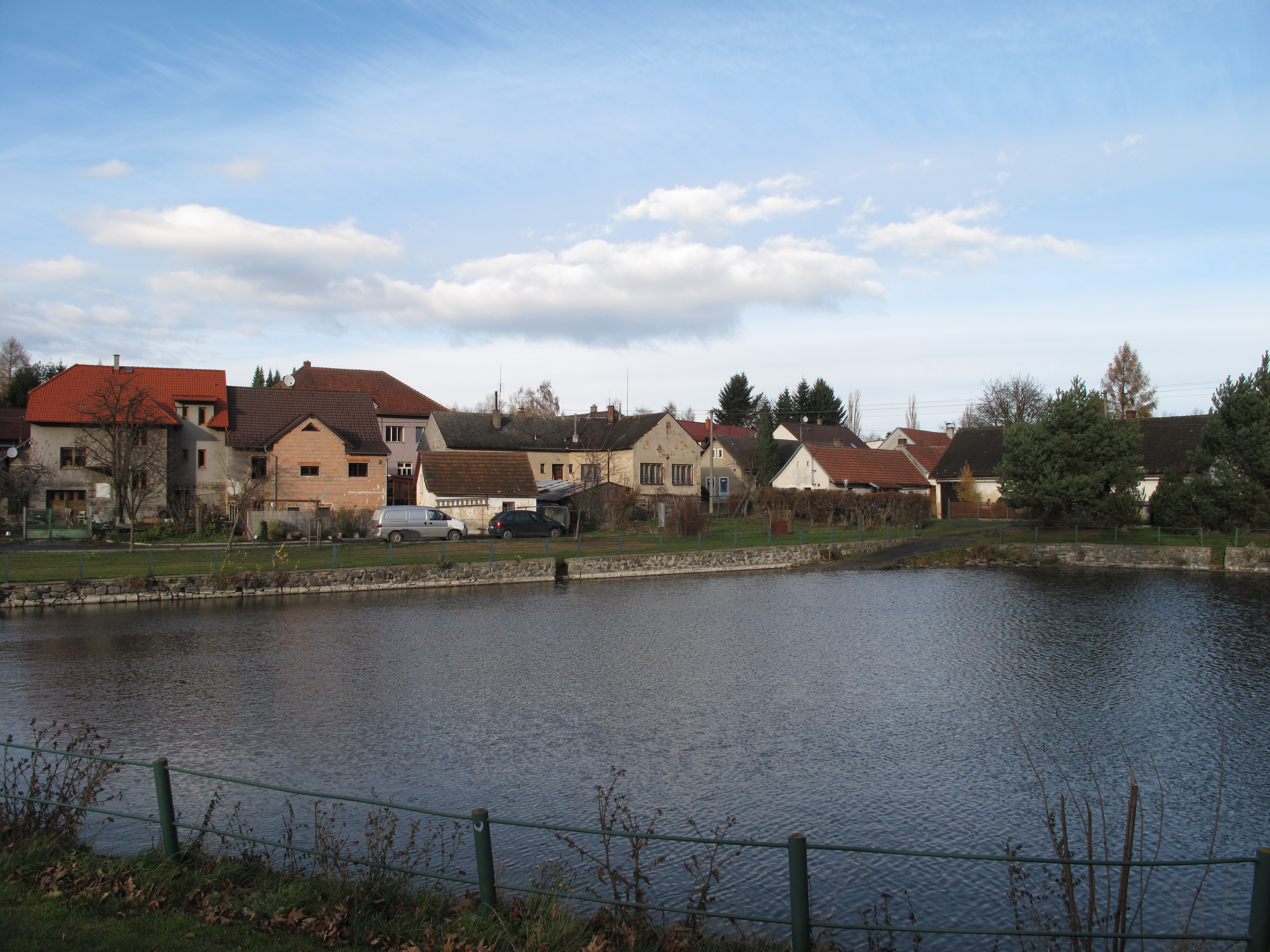
- Fishpond in the centre of Střezimíř

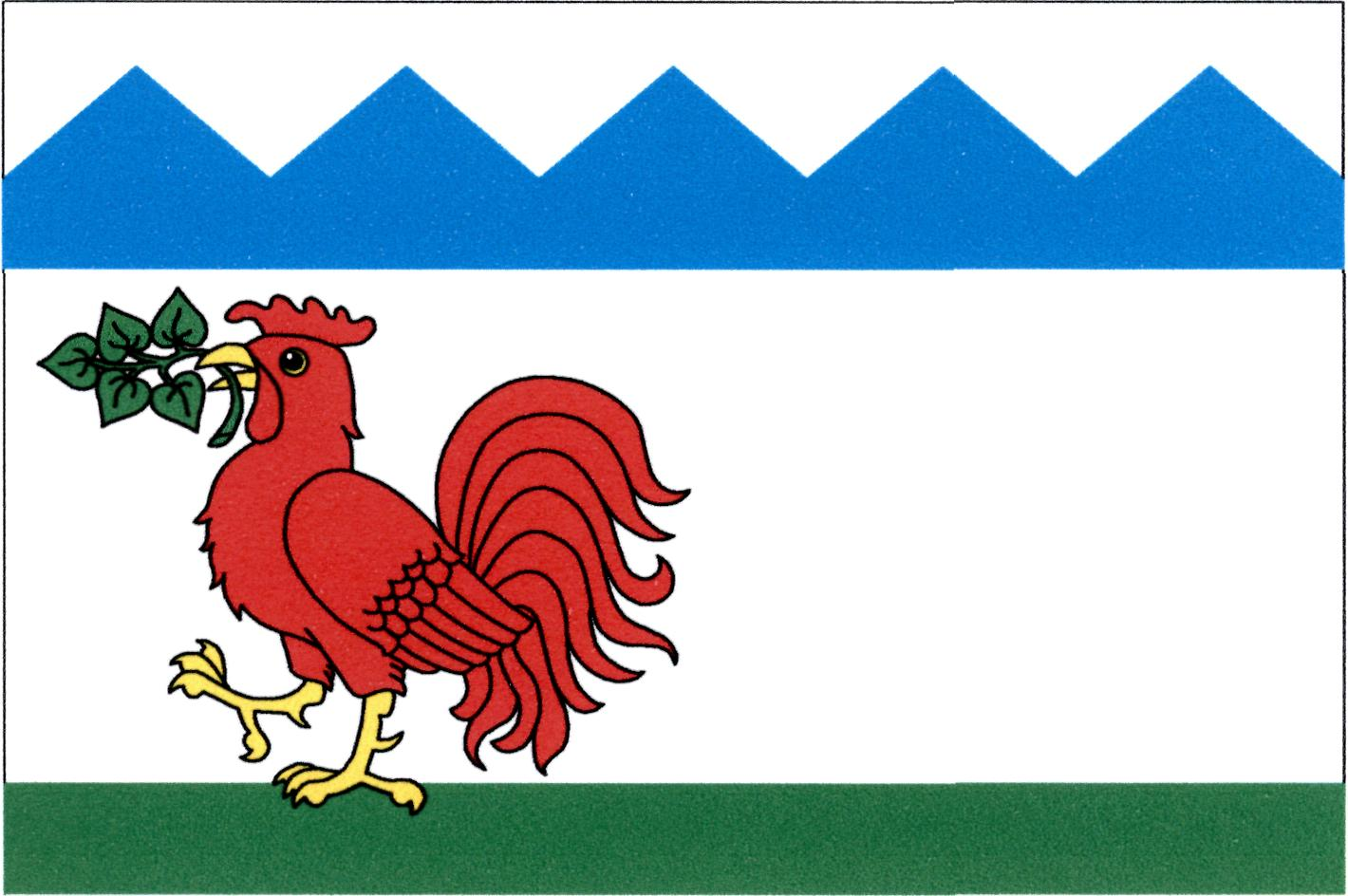
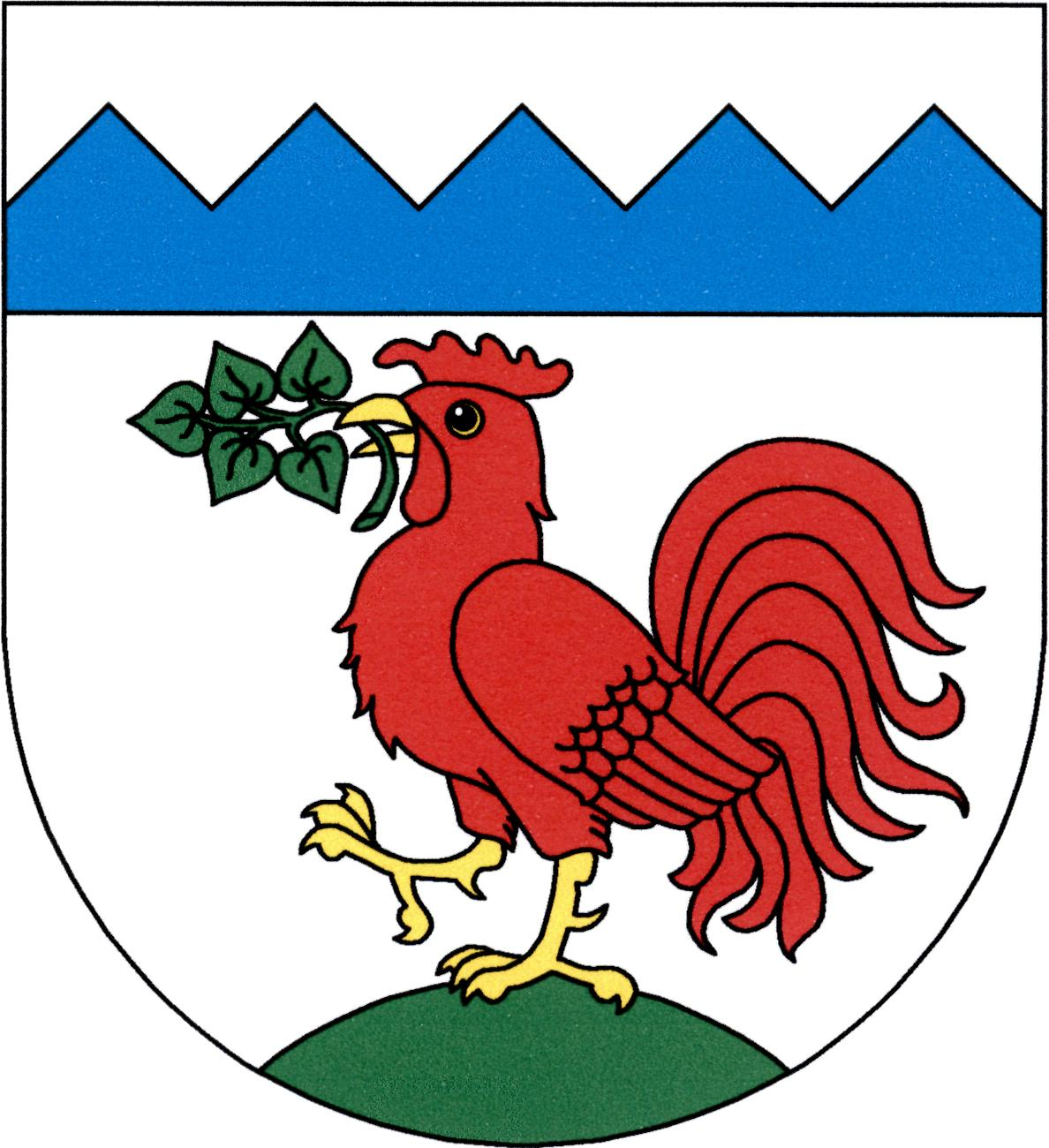
- Flag Coat of arms

- Location in the Czech Republic
- Coordinates: 49°31′55″N 14°36′41″E
- Country: Czech Republic
- Region: Central Bohemian
- District: Benešov
- First mentioned: 1219

Area
  - Total: 8.20 km^{2} (3.17 sq mi)
- Elevation: 595 m (1,952 ft)

Population (2026-01-01)
  - Total: 304
  - Density: 37.1/km^{2} (96.0/sq mi)
- Time zone: UTC+1 (CET)
  - Summer (DST): UTC+2 (CEST)
- Postal codes: 257 87, 257 91
- Website: www.strezimir.cz

Střezimíř is a municipality and village in Benešov District in the Central Bohemian Region of the Czech Republic. It has about 300 inhabitants.

== Administrative division ==
Střezimíř consists of five municipal parts (in brackets population according to the 2021 census):

- Střezimíř (286)
- Bonkovice (21)
- Černotice (4)
- Dolní Dobřejov (5)
- Horní Dobřejov (3)

== Etymology ==
The name is derived from the personal name Střezimír, meaning "Střezimír's (court)".

== Geography ==
Střezimíř is located about 28 kilometres (17 mi) south of Benešov, 14 km (9 mi) north of Tábor and 57 km (35 mi) south of Prague. It lies in the Vlašim Uplands. The highest point is the hill Větrov at 639 m (2,096 ft) above sea level. The Mastník River originates in the municipality. There are several small fishponds in the municipal territory. Most of them are supplied by the brook Bonkovický potok.

== History ==
The first written mention of Střezimíř is from 1219.

== Demographics ==
Historical population

Year	Pop.	±%
1869	968	—
1880	867	−10.4%
1890	802	−7.5%
1900	700	−12.7%
1910	686	−2.0%

Year	Pop.	±%
1921	711	+3.6%
1930	711	+0.0%
1950	551	−22.5%
1961	593	+7.6%
1970	506	−14.7%

Year	Pop.	±%
1980	408	−19.4%
1991	366	−10.3%
2001	339	−7.4%
2011	314	−7.4%
2021	319	+1.6%

Source: Censuses

== Transport ==
The train station called Střezimíř is located on the railway line Tábor–Olbramovice. However, the station is situated just outside the municipality.

== Sights ==
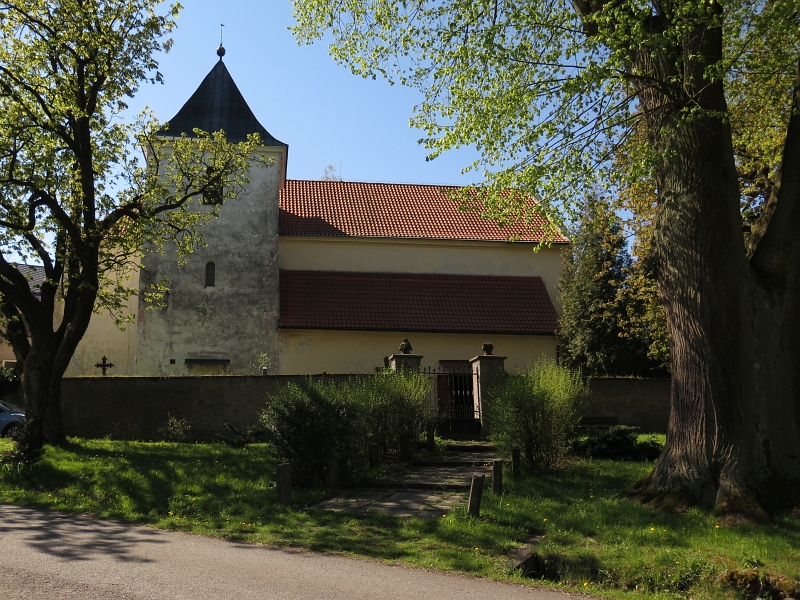
Church of Saint Gall

The most important monument of Střezimíř is the Church of Saint Gall. It is a Gothic building, modified and extended into its present form in the 17th century and in 1908.

A notable building is the Střezimíř Castle. it was originally a fortress, rebuilt into a Baroque castle in the 18th century and modified in 1924. Today it is used for residential purposes.
