= Radíč =

- Municipality
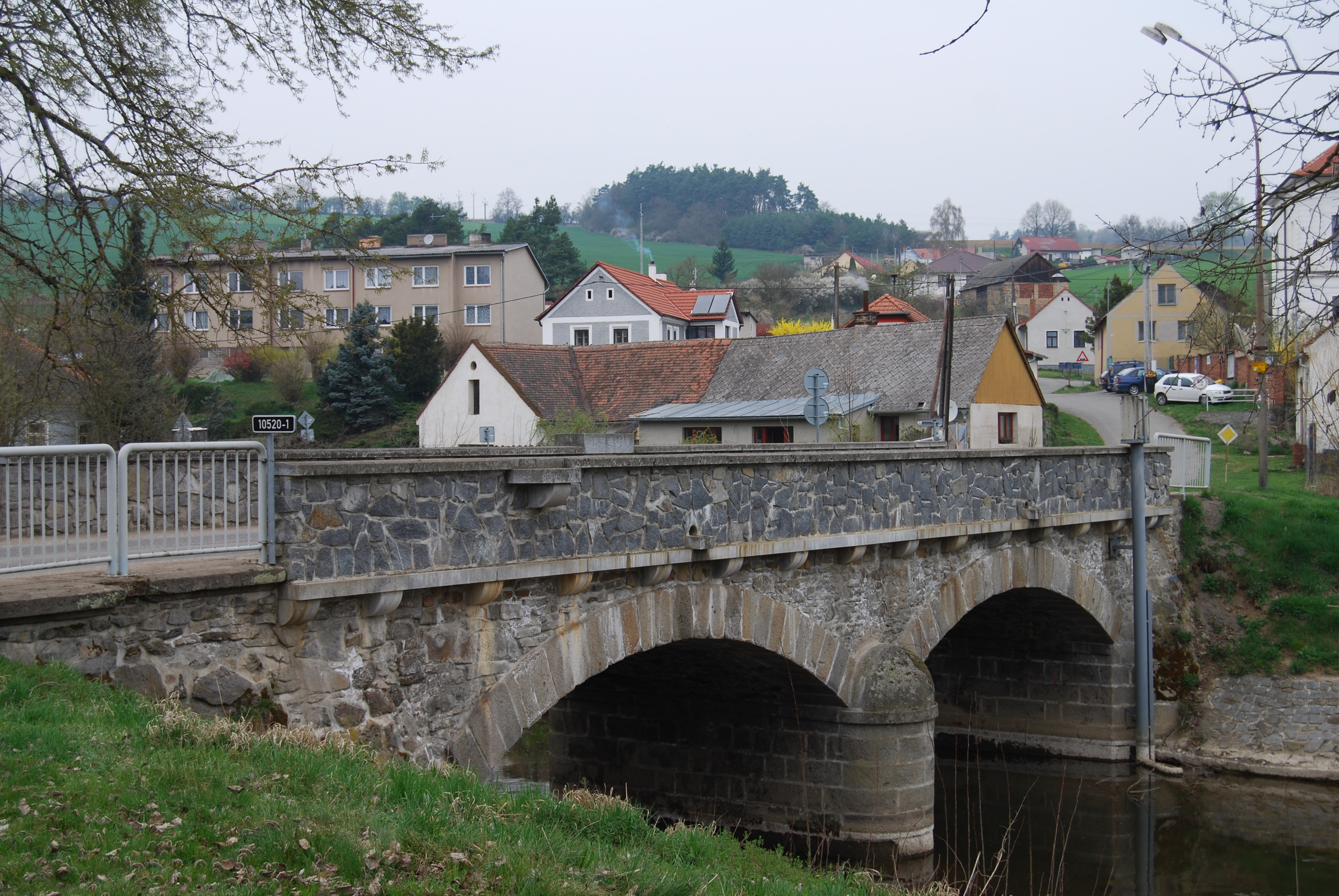
- Bridge over the Mastník River

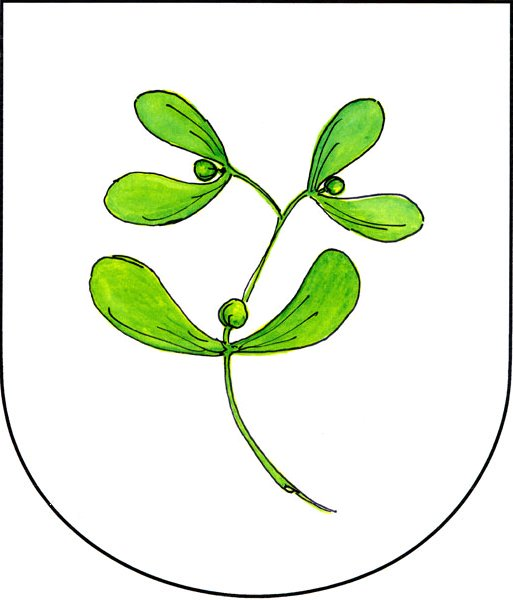
- Flag Coat of arms

- Location in the Czech Republic
- Coordinates: 49°42′53″N 14°25′3″E
- Country: Czech Republic
- Region: Central Bohemian
- District: Příbram
- First mentioned: 1333

Area
  - Total: 12.50 km^{2} (4.83 sq mi)
- Elevation: 301 m (988 ft)

Population (2026-01-01)
  - Total: 234
  - Density: 18.7/km^{2} (48.5/sq mi)
- Time zone: UTC+1 (CET)
  - Summer (DST): UTC+2 (CEST)
- Postal code: 264 01
- Website: www.radic-obec.cz

Radíč is a municipality and village in Příbram District in the Central Bohemian Region of the Czech Republic. It has about 200 inhabitants.

== Administrative division ==
Radíč consists of four municipal parts (in brackets population according to the 2021 census):

- Radíč (137)
- Dubliny (17)
- Hrazany (18)
- Žďár (45)

== Etymology ==
The name is derived from the personal name Radík, meaning "Radík's (court)".

== Geography ==
Radíč is located about 30 kilometres (19 mi) east of Příbram and 35 km (22 mi) south of Prague. It lies in the Benešov Uplands. The highest point is the hill Na Vrchu at 462 m (1,516 ft) above sea level. The Mastník River flows through the municipality. The northern municipal border is formed by the Slapy Reservoir (built on the Vltava River), to which the Mastník flows.

== History ==
The first written mention of Radíč is from 1333.

== Demographics ==
Historical population

Year	Pop.	±%
1869	790	—
1880	720	−8.9%
1890	702	−2.5%
1900	542	−22.8%
1910	506	−6.6%

Year	Pop.	±%
1921	481	−4.9%
1930	458	−4.8%
1950	340	−25.8%
1961	354	+4.1%
1970	301	−15.0%

Year	Pop.	±%
1980	265	−12.0%
1991	226	−14.7%
2001	214	−5.3%
2011	201	−6.1%
2021	217	+8.0%

Source: Censuses

== Transport ==
There are no railways or major roads passing through the municipality.

== Sights ==
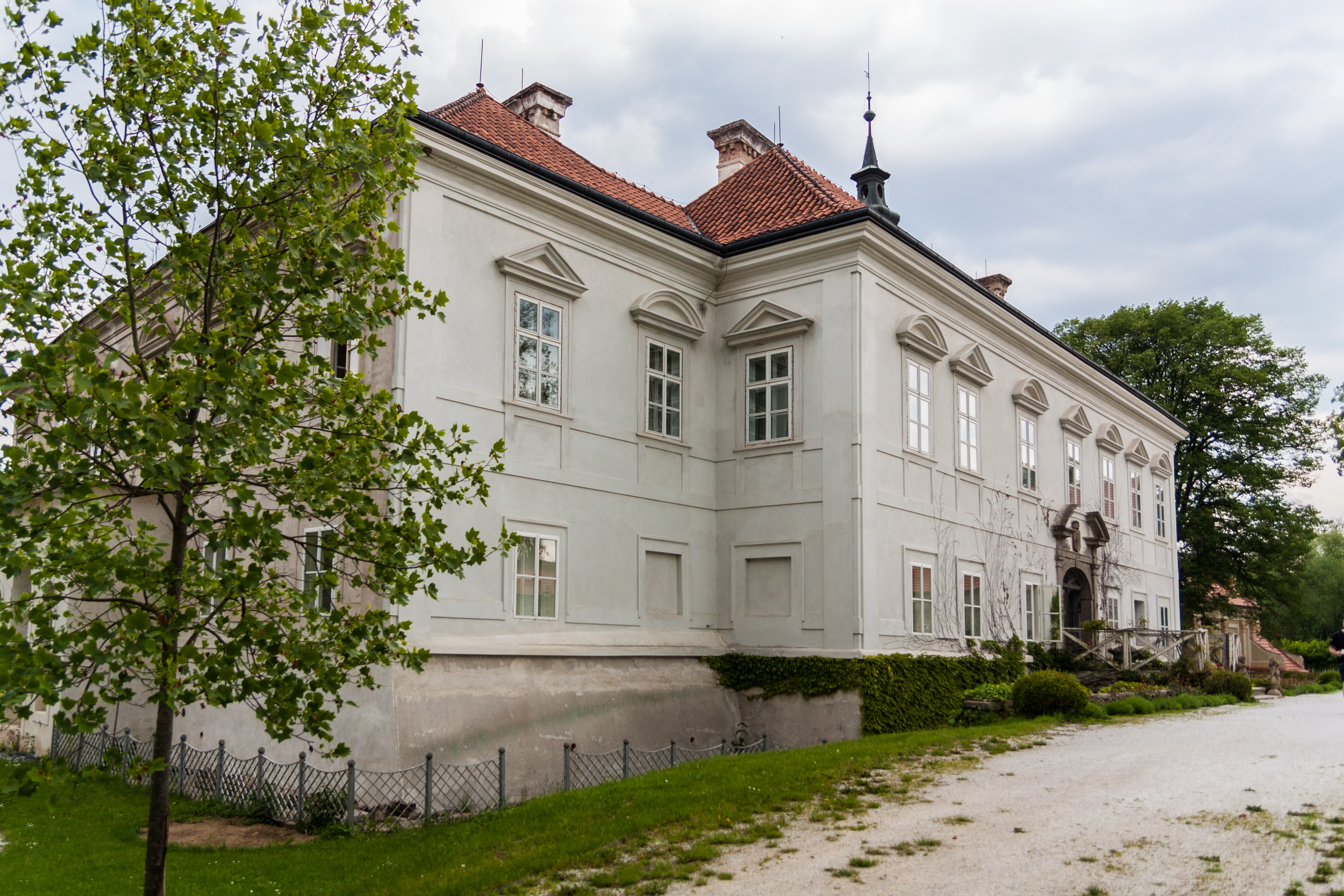
Radíč Castle

The main landmark of Radíč is the Radíč Castle. It was originally a Renaissance fortress, rebuilt around 1680 into an early Baroque castle. Later it was modified and extended. A part of the castle complex is the Chapel of the Visitation of the Virgin Mary, which is a copy of the chapel in the Einsiedeln Abbey. Today the castle is privately owned and is occasionally open to the public.
