= Miličín =

- Town
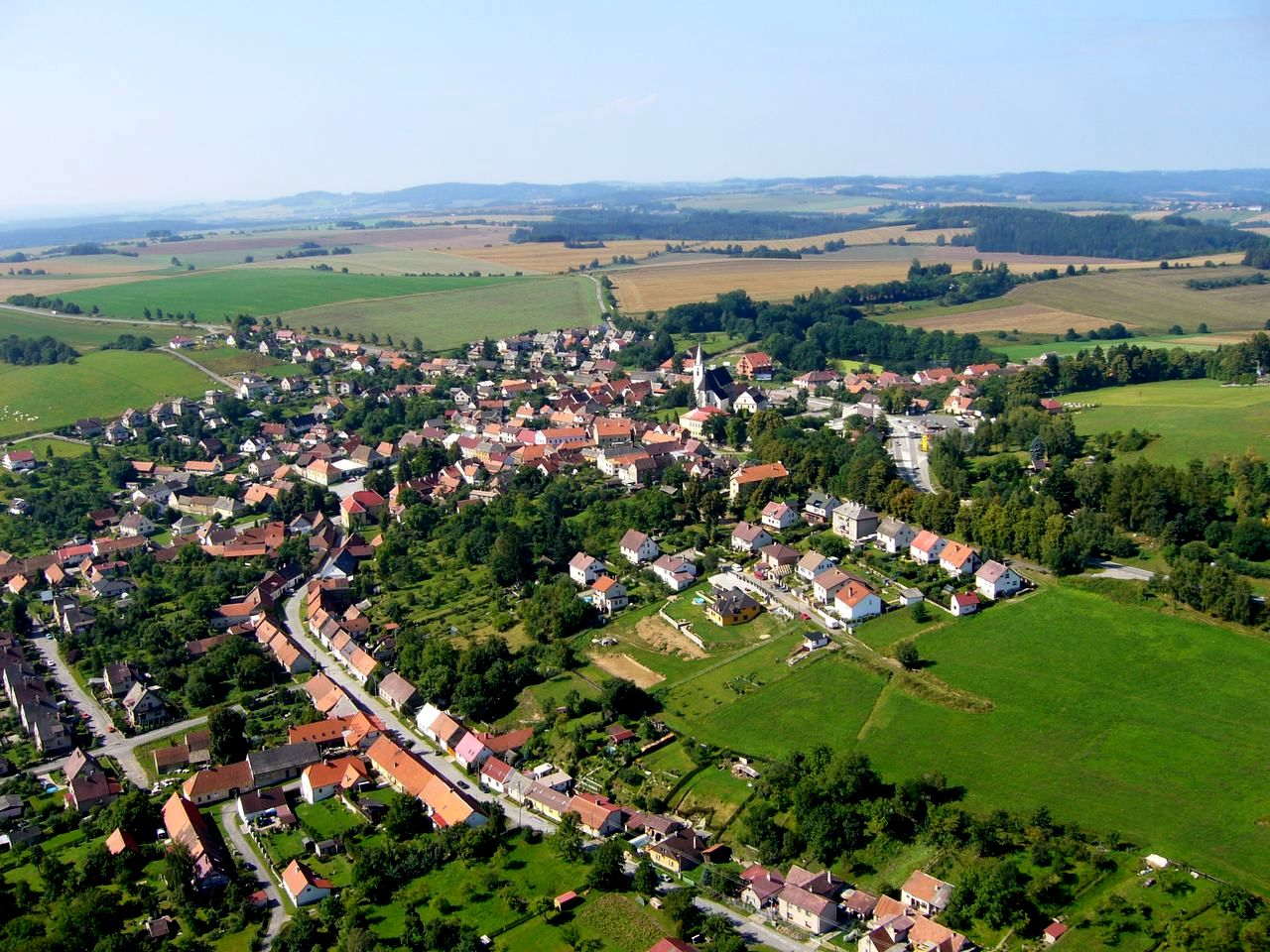
- Aerial view

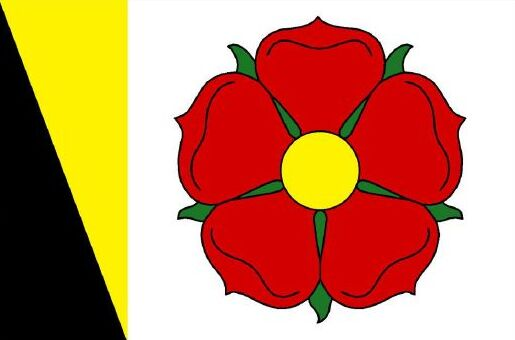
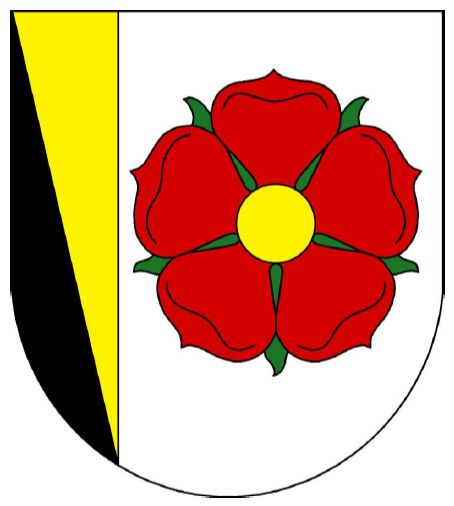
- Flag Coat of arms

- Location in the Czech Republic
- Coordinates: 49°34′15″N 14°39′41″E
- Country: Czech Republic
- Region: Central Bohemian
- District: Benešov
- First mentioned: 1283

Government
  - Mayor: Václav Karda

Area
  - Total: 25.72 km^{2} (9.93 sq mi)
- Elevation: 617 m (2,024 ft)

Population (2026-01-01)
  - Total: 896
  - Density: 34.8/km^{2} (90.2/sq mi)
- Time zone: UTC+1 (CET)
  - Summer (DST): UTC+2 (CEST)
- Postal code: 257 86
- Website: www.milicin.eu

Miličín (Czech pronunciation: [ˈmɪlɪtʃiːn]) is a town in Benešov District in the Central Bohemian Region of the Czech Republic. It has about 900 inhabitants.

== Administrative division ==
Miličín consists of nine municipal parts (in brackets population according to the 2021 census):

- Miličín (613)
- Kahlovice (27)
- Malovice (31)
- Nasavrky (18)
- Nové Dvory (14)
- Petrovice (69)
- Reksyně (9)
- Záhoří u Miličína (67)
- Žibkov (8)

== Etymology ==
The name is derived from the personal name Milice, meaning "Milice's".

== Geography ==
Miličín is located about 17 kilometres (11 mi) north of Tábor and 52 km (32 mi) south of Prague. It lies in the Vlašim Uplands. The highest point is the hill Kalvárie at 698 m (2,290 ft) above sea level. The Mastník River briefly crosses the municipal territory in the west. The territory of Miličín is rich in small brooks and fishponds.

== History ==
The first written mention of Miličín is from 1283. It was owned by a family that called themself the Lords of Miličín. After the last member of the family was killed in the Battle of Crécy, the Rosenberg family inherited the village. During their rule, Miličín was promoted to a town. The Rosenbergs owned the town until 1611, when the last member of the family died. In 1644, during the Thirty Years' War, the town burned down.

Miličín used to be a centre of trade, but after the construction of the railway from Prague to České Budějovice, which avoided it, it found itself on the periphery and reoriented itself to agriculture.

In 2022, the status of a town was restored to Miličín.

== Demographics ==
Historical population

| Year | Pop. | ±% |
|---|---|---|
| 1869 | 2,975 | — |
| 1880 | 2,768 | −7.0% |
| 1890 | 2,495 | −9.9% |
| 1900 | 2,325 | −6.8% |
| 1910 | 2,103 | −9.5% |

| Year | Pop. | ±% |
|---|---|---|
| 1921 | 2,118 | +0.7% |
| 1930 | 1,877 | −11.4% |
| 1950 | 1,448 | −22.9% |
| 1961 | 1,320 | −8.8% |
| 1970 | 1,132 | −14.2% |

| Year | Pop. | ±% |
|---|---|---|
| 1980 | 1,009 | −10.9% |
| 1991 | 942 | −6.6% |
| 2001 | 904 | −4.0% |
| 2011 | 877 | −3.0% |
| 2021 | 856 | −2.4% |

Source: Censuses

== Transport ==
The I/3 road (part of the European route E55), which replaces the unfinished section of the D3 motorway from Prague to Tábor, runs through the town.

== Sights ==
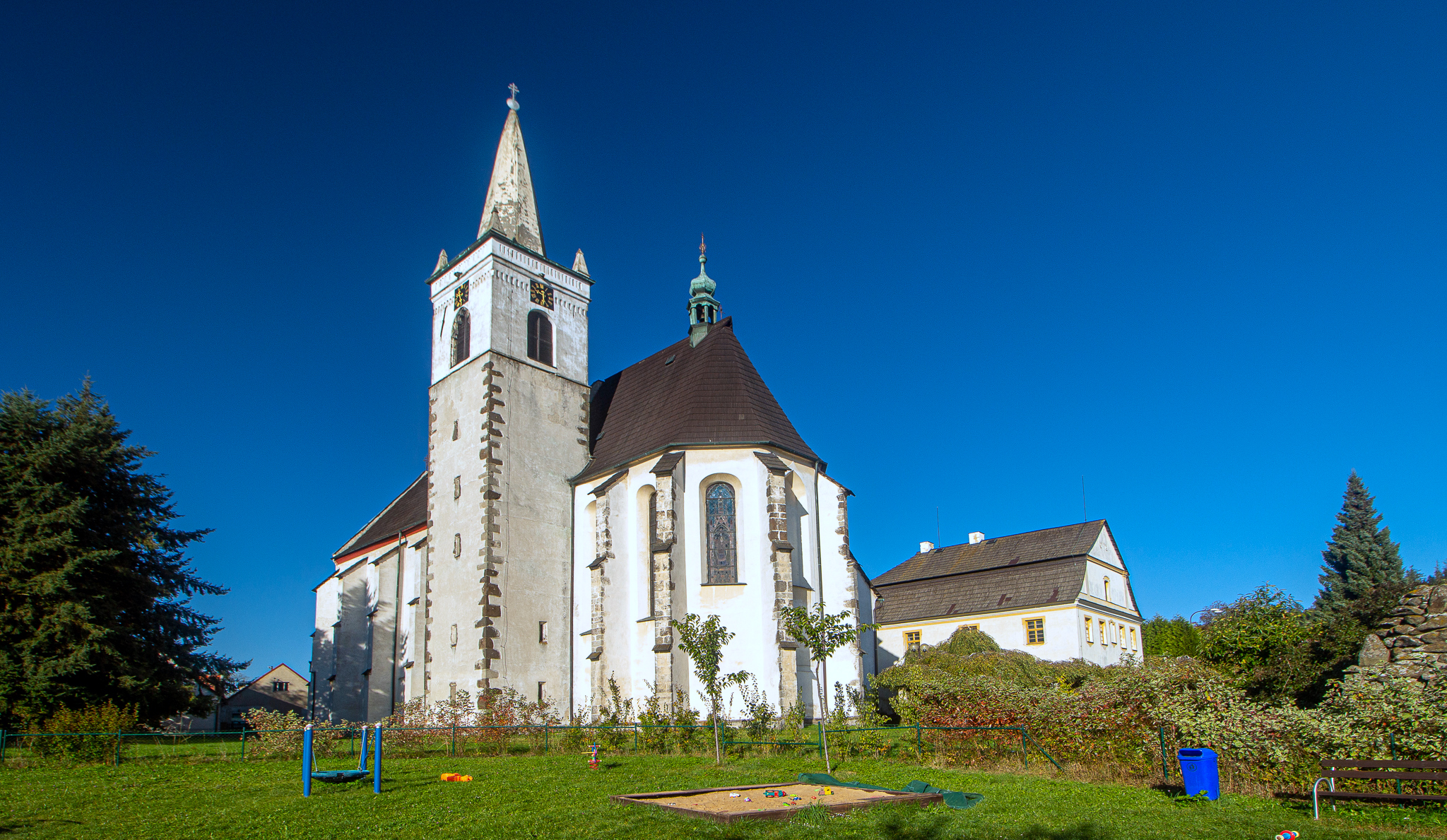
Church of the Nativity of the Virgin Mary

The main landmark of Miličín is the Church of the Nativity of the Virgin Mary. It was built in the Gothic style in 1380–1384. In 1754, it was rebuilt in the Baroque style.

On Kalvárie Hill is the Chapel of the Passion of the Lord, which dates from 1748. The Stations of the Cross from 1796 lead to the chapel.
