= Ješetice =

- Municipality
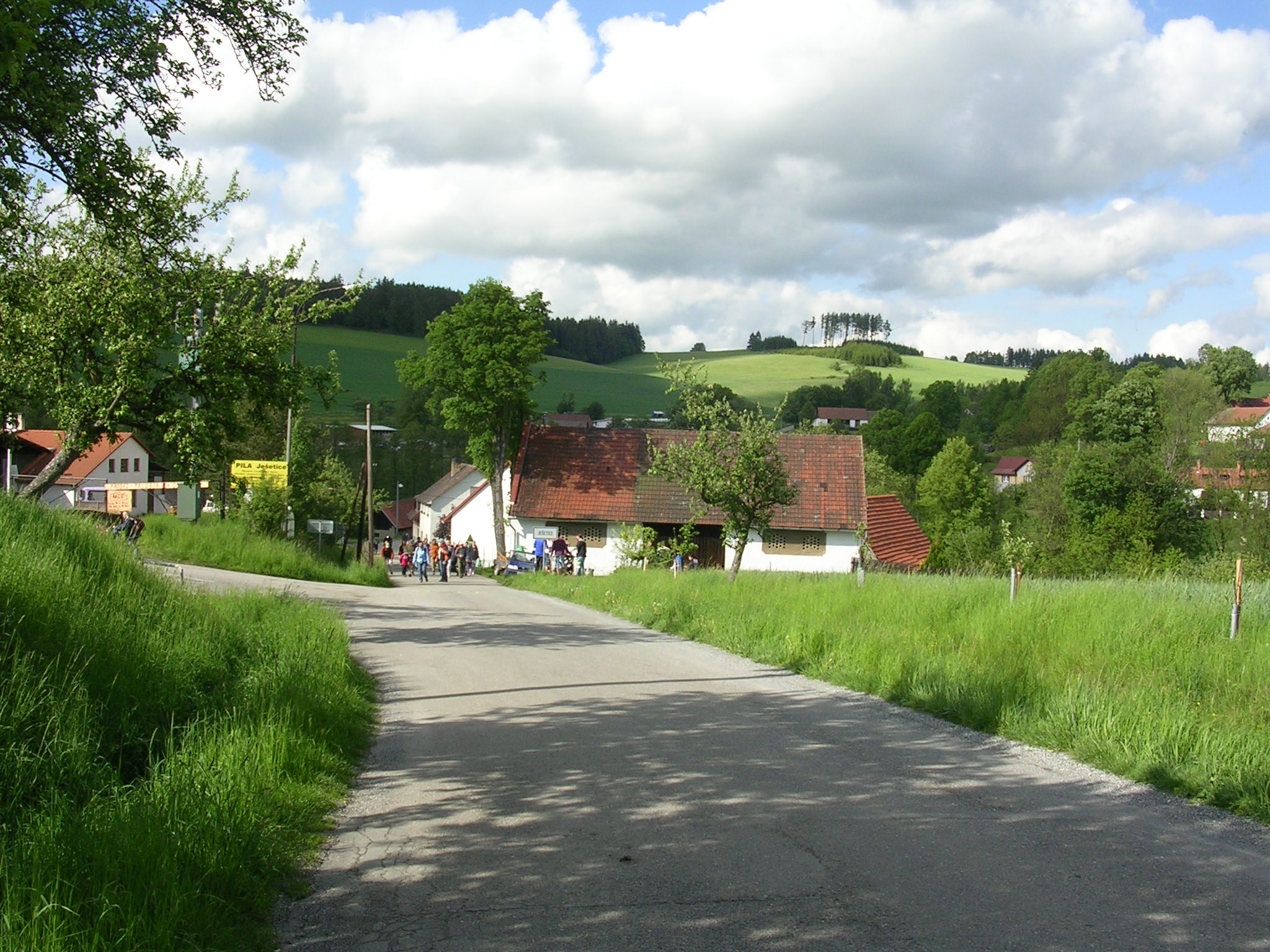
- Entrance to Ješetice

- Location in the Czech Republic
- Coordinates: 49°34′52″N 14°36′37″E
- Country: Czech Republic
- Region: Central Bohemian
- District: Benešov
- First mentioned: 1358

Area
  - Total: 7.26 km^{2} (2.80 sq mi)
- Elevation: 520 m (1,710 ft)

Population (2026-01-01)
  - Total: 129
  - Density: 17.8/km^{2} (46.0/sq mi)
- Time zone: UTC+1 (CET)
  - Summer (DST): UTC+2 (CEST)
- Postal code: 257 89
- Website: www.jesetice.cz

Ješetice is a municipality and village in Benešov District in the Central Bohemian Region of the Czech Republic. It has about 100 inhabitants.

== Administrative division ==
Ješetice consists of five municipal parts (in brackets population according to the 2021 census):

- Ješetice (57)
- Báňov (8)
- Hlaváčkova Lhota (5)
- Radíč (39)
- Řikov (18)

== Demographics ==
Historical population
Year	Pop.	±%
1869	383	—
1880	376	−1.8%
1890	331	−12.0%
1900	311	−6.0%
1910	332	+6.8%
1921	331	−0.3%
1930	317	−4.2%
1950	233	−26.5%
1961	206	−11.6%
1970	185	−10.2%
1980	173	−6.5%
1991	145	−16.2%
2001	125	−13.8%
2011	121	−3.2%
2021	127	+5.0%
Source: Censuses
