= Smilkov =

- Municipality
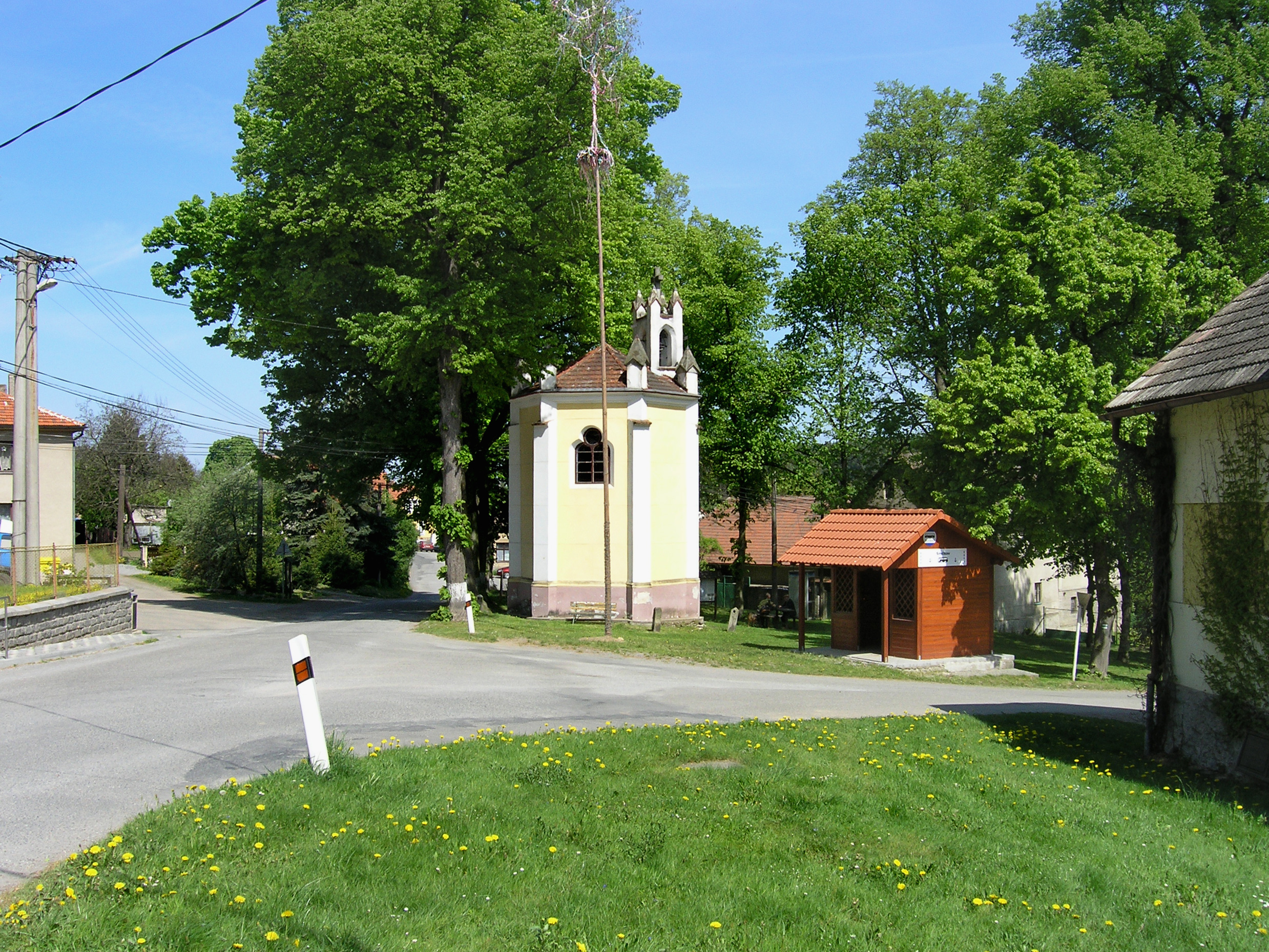
- Centre of Smilkov

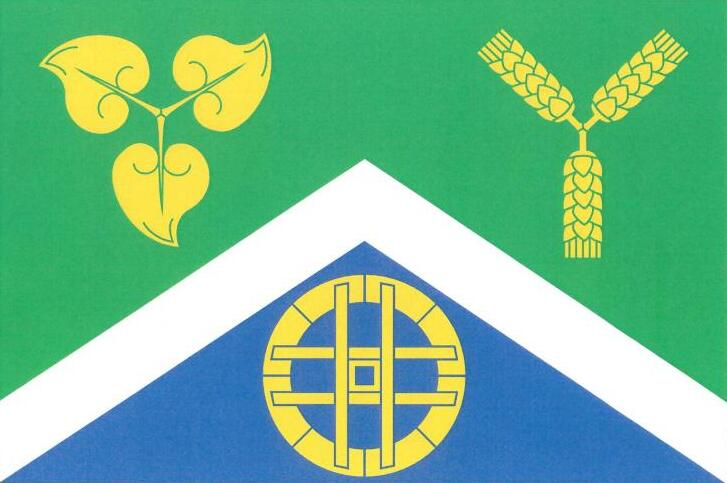
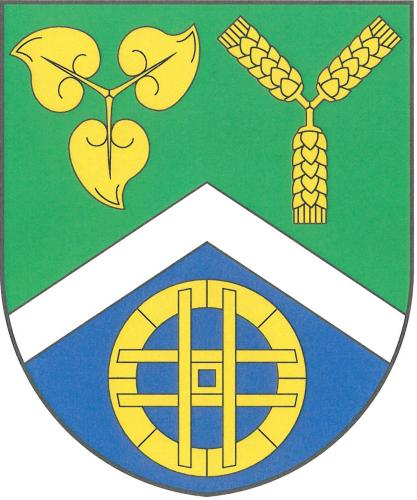
- Flag Coat of arms

- Location in the Czech Republic
- Coordinates: 49°36′9″N 14°37′3″E
- Country: Czech Republic
- Region: Central Bohemian
- District: Benešov
- First mentioned: 1383

Area
  - Total: 11.21 km^{2} (4.33 sq mi)
- Elevation: 521 m (1,709 ft)

Population (2026-01-01)
  - Total: 259
  - Density: 23.1/km^{2} (59.8/sq mi)
- Time zone: UTC+1 (CET)
  - Summer (DST): UTC+2 (CEST)
- Postal codes: 257 86, 257 89
- Website: smilkov.cz

Smilkov is a municipality and village in Benešov District in the Central Bohemian Region of the Czech Republic. It has about 300 inhabitants.

== Administrative division ==
Smilkov consists of six municipal parts (in brackets population according to the 2021 census):

- Smilkov (153)
- Kouty (45)
- Líštěnec (28)
- Oldřichovec (21)
- Plachova Lhota (11)
- Zechov (4)

== Demographics ==
Historical population
Year	Pop.	±%
1869	796	—
1880	690	−13.3%
1890	719	+4.2%
1900	669	−7.0%
1910	683	+2.1%
1921	649	−5.0%
1930	628	−3.2%
1950	518	−17.5%
1961	511	−1.4%
1970	505	−1.2%
1980	461	−8.7%
1991	384	−16.7%
2001	271	−29.4%
2011	265	−2.2%
2021	262	−1.1%
Source: Censuses
