= Kňovice =

- Municipality
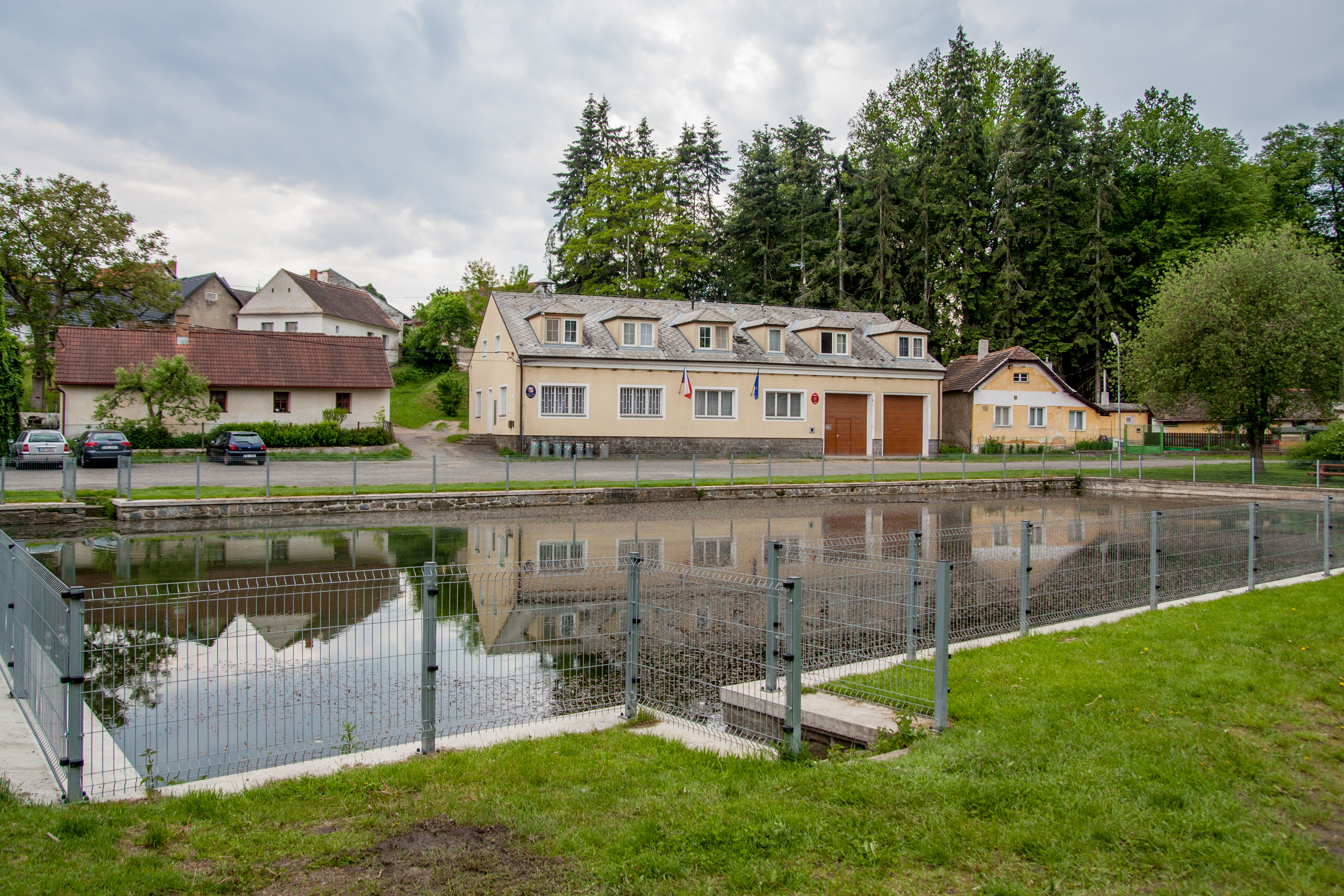
- Water reservoir and municipal office

- Location in the Czech Republic
- Coordinates: 49°41′18″N 14°24′1″E
- Country: Czech Republic
- Region: Central Bohemian
- District: Příbram
- First mentioned: 1333

Area
  - Total: 8.72 km^{2} (3.37 sq mi)
- Elevation: 358 m (1,175 ft)

Population (2026-01-01)
  - Total: 334
  - Density: 38.3/km^{2} (99.2/sq mi)
- Time zone: UTC+1 (CET)
  - Summer (DST): UTC+2 (CEST)
- Postal code: 264 01
- Website: www.obecknovice.cz

Kňovice is a municipality and village in Příbram District in the Central Bohemian Region of the Czech Republic. It has about 300 inhabitants.

== Administrative division ==
Kňovice consists of three municipal parts (in brackets population according to the 2021 census):

- Kňovice (272)
- Kňovičky (46)
- Úsuší (2)

== Demographics ==
Historical population
Year	Pop.	±%
1869	497	—
1880	555	+11.7%
1890	582	+4.9%
1900	567	−2.6%
1910	512	−9.7%
1921	507	−1.0%
1930	471	−7.1%
1950	371	−21.2%
1961	381	+2.7%
1970	332	−12.9%
1980	303	−8.7%
1991	323	+6.6%
2001	314	−2.8%
2011	325	+3.5%
2021	320	−1.5%
Source: Censuses

== Gallery ==
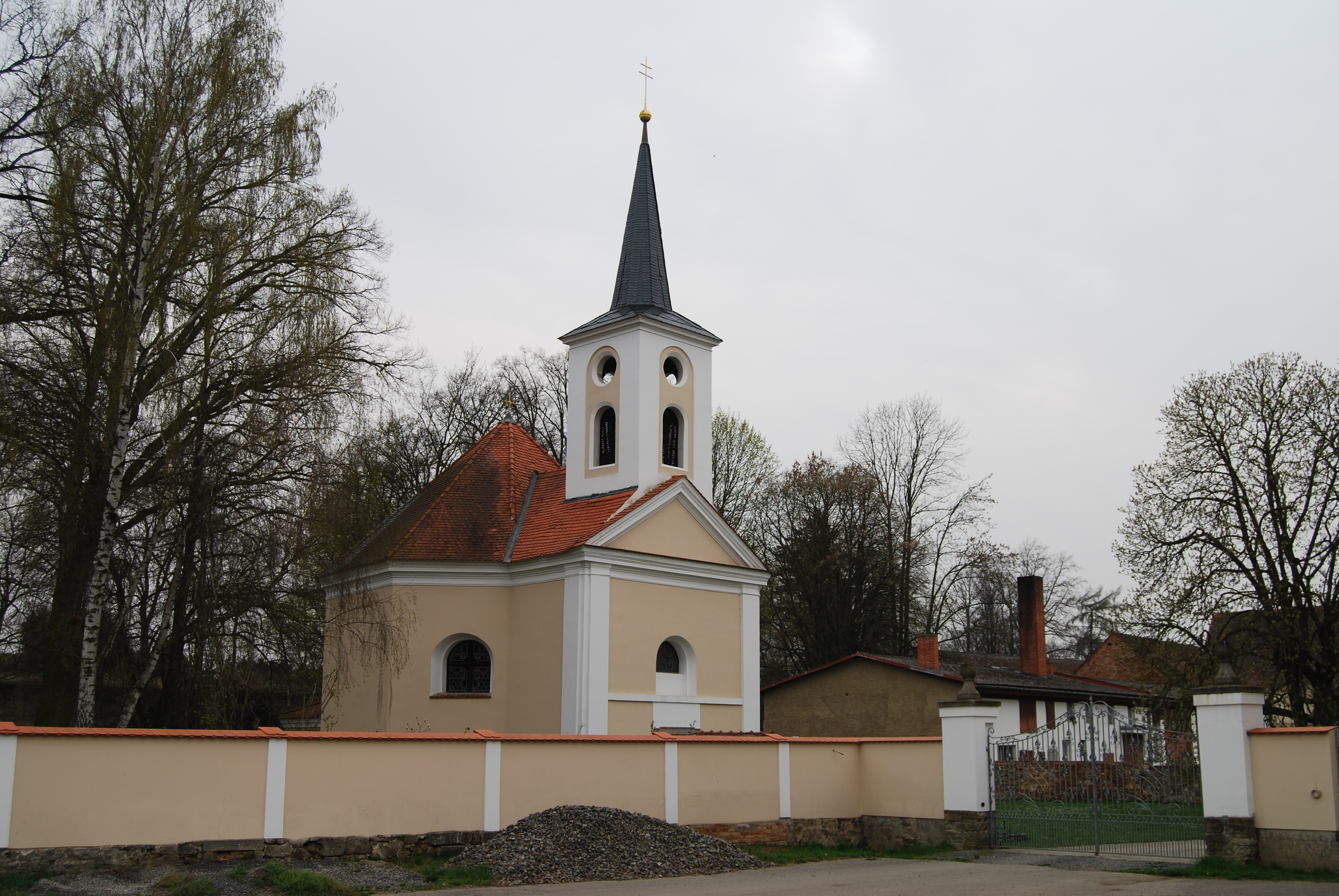
Chapel of Saint Joseph

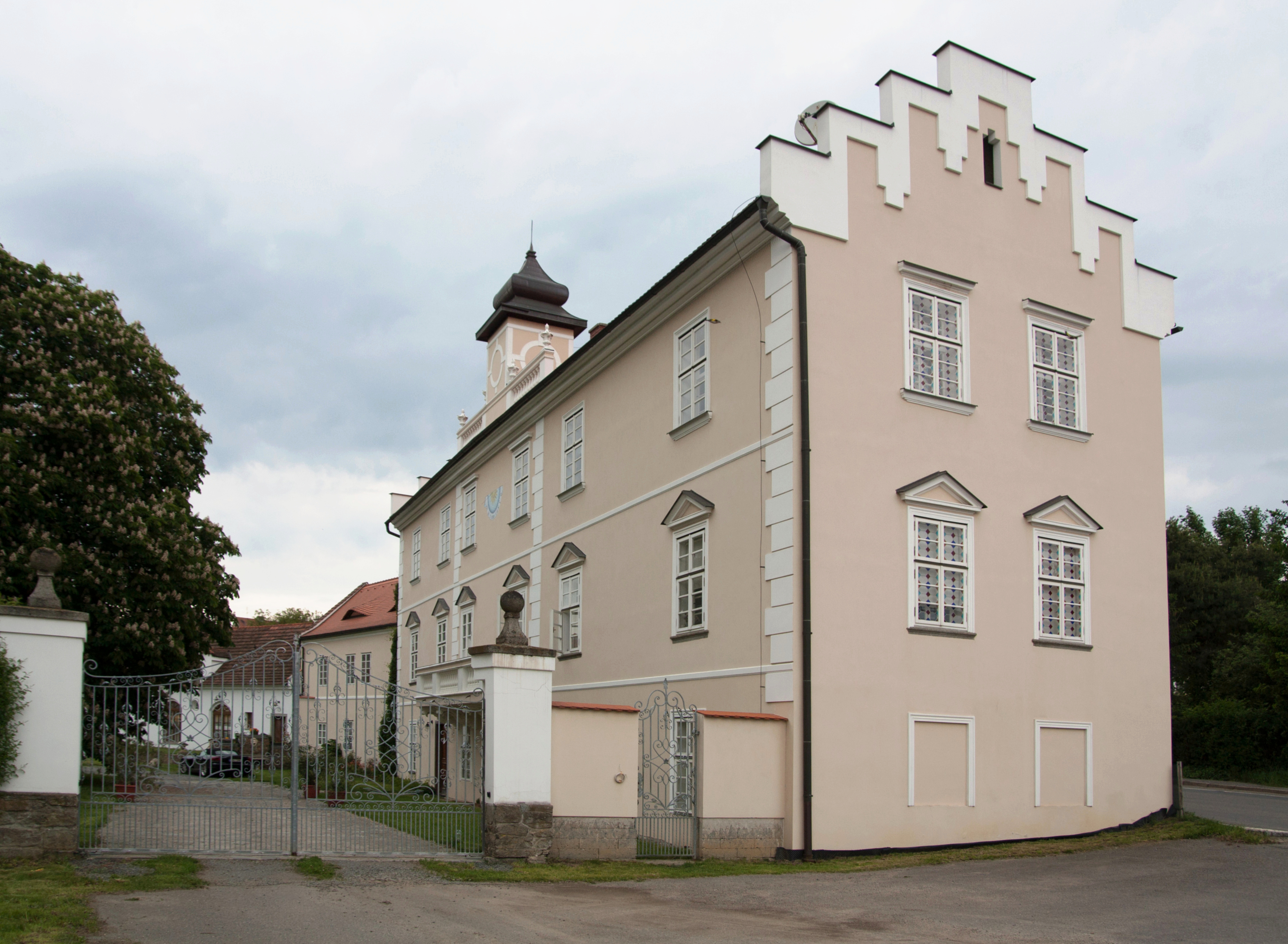
Kňovice Castle

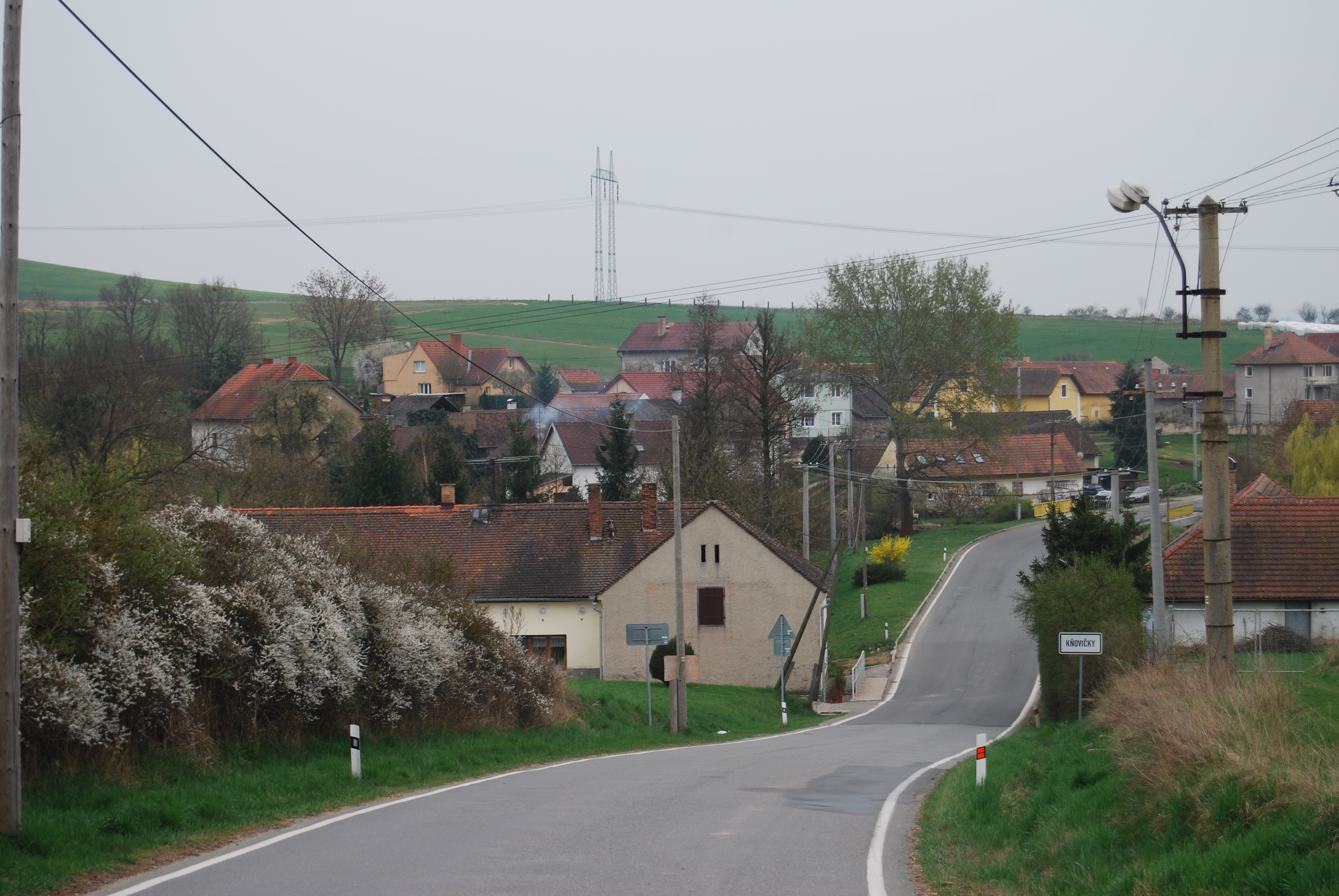
Kňovičky, a part of Kňovice
