= Osečany =

- Municipality
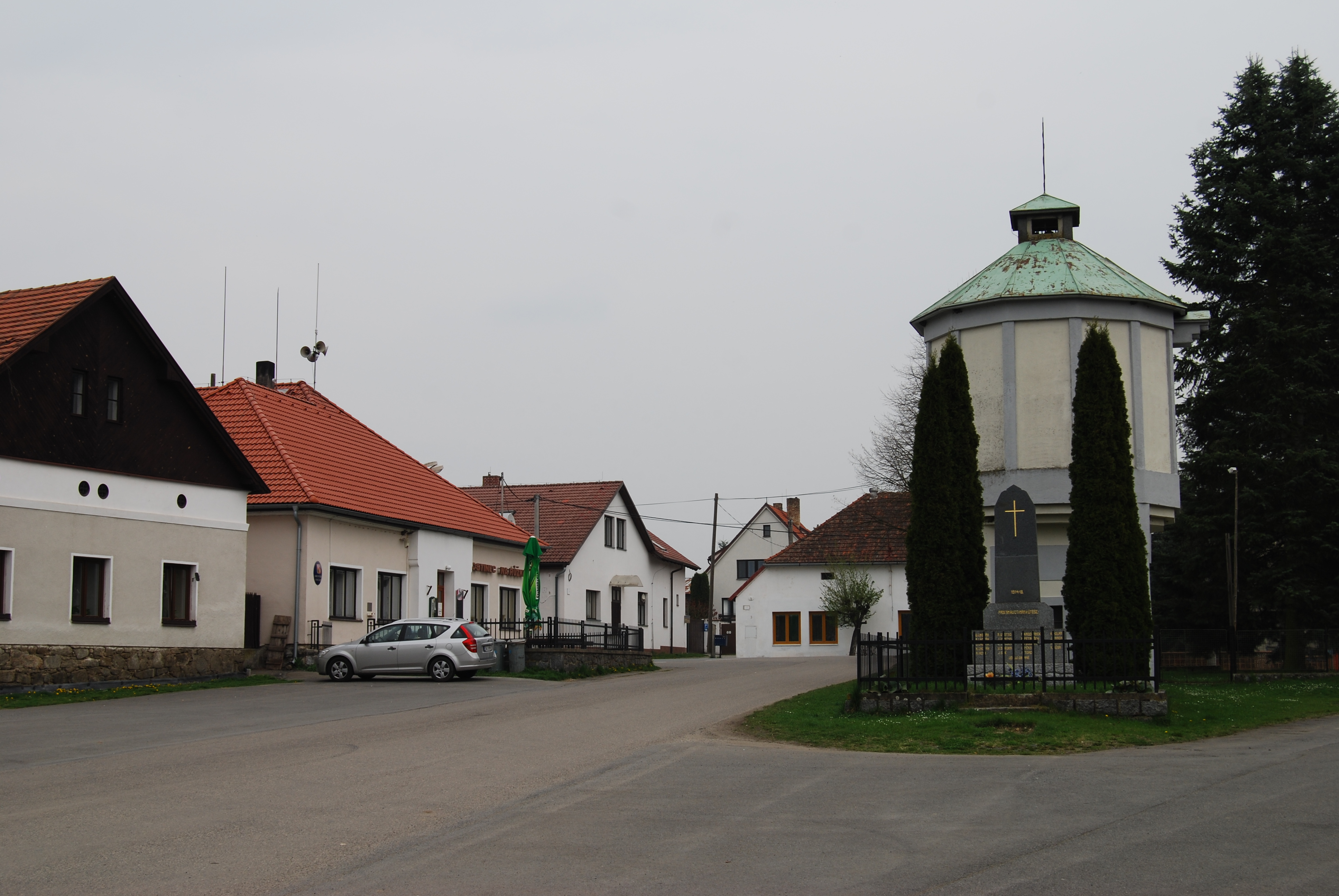
- Centre of Osečany

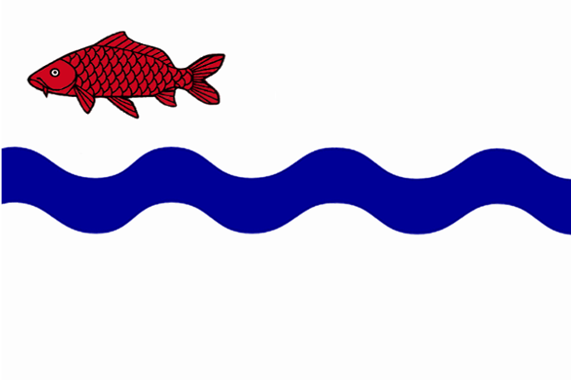
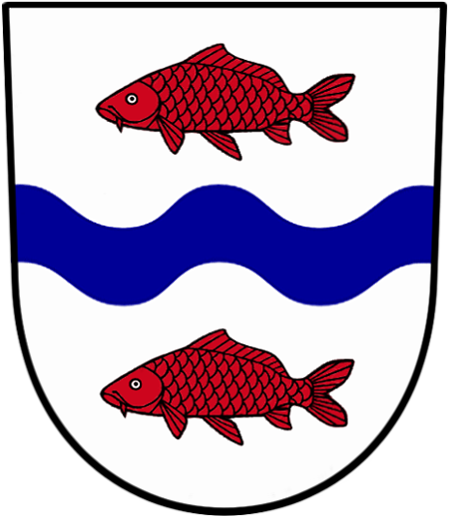
- Flag Coat of arms

- Location in the Czech Republic
- Coordinates: 49°41′52″N 14°26′16″E
- Country: Czech Republic
- Region: Central Bohemian
- District: Příbram
- First mentioned: 1352

Area
  - Total: 8.36 km^{2} (3.23 sq mi)
- Elevation: 361 m (1,184 ft)

Population (2026-01-01)
  - Total: 270
  - Density: 32/km^{2} (84/sq mi)
- Time zone: UTC+1 (CET)
  - Summer (DST): UTC+2 (CEST)
- Postal code: 264 01
- Website: www.osecany.cz

Osečany is a municipality and village in Příbram District in the Central Bohemian Region of the Czech Republic. It has about 300 inhabitants.

== Administrative division ==
Osečany consists of three municipal parts (in brackets population according to the 2021 census):

- Osečany (201)
- Paseky (1)
- Velběhy (40)

== Demographics ==
Historical population
| Year | Pop. | ±% |
|---|---|---|
| 1869 | 567 | — |
| 1880 | 587 | +3.5% |
| 1890 | 605 | +3.1% |
| 1900 | 605 | +0.0% |
| 1910 | 572 | −5.5% |
| 1921 | 523 | −8.6% |
| 1930 | 488 | −6.7% |
| 1950 | 372 | −23.8% |
| 1961 | 377 | +1.3% |
| 1970 | 335 | −11.1% |
| 1980 | 294 | −12.2% |
| 1991 | 280 | −4.8% |
| 2001 | 266 | −5.0% |
| 2011 | 258 | −3.0% |
| 2021 | 242 | −6.2% |
Source: Censuses
