= Votice =

- Town
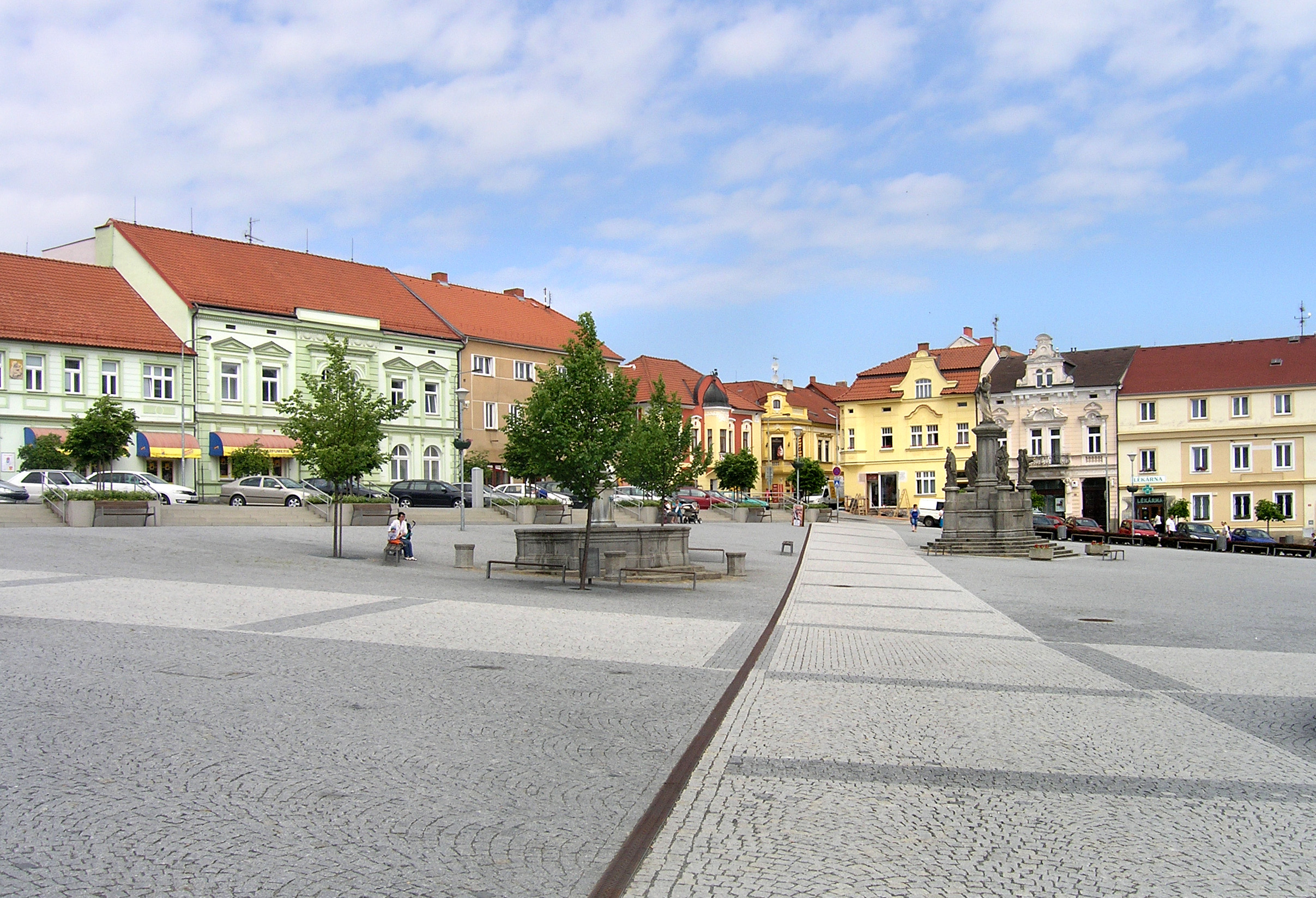
- The square Komenského náměstí

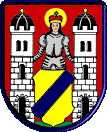
- Flag Coat of arms

- Location in the Czech Republic
- Coordinates: 49°38′25″N 14°38′17″E
- Country: Czech Republic
- Region: Central Bohemian
- District: Benešov
- First mentioned: 1318

Government
  - Mayor: Iva Malá

Area
  - Total: 36.55 km^{2} (14.11 sq mi)
- Elevation: 483 m (1,585 ft)

Population (2026-01-01)
  - Total: 4,777
  - Density: 130.7/km^{2} (338.5/sq mi)
- Time zone: UTC+1 (CET)
  - Summer (DST): UTC+2 (CEST)
- Postal code: 259 01
- Website: www.mesto-votice.cz

Votice (Czech pronunciation: [ˈvocɪtsɛ]; German: Wotitz) is a town in Benešov District in the Central Bohemian Region of the Czech Republic. It has about 4,800 inhabitants. The most important monument in Votice is the former Monastery of Saint Francis of Assisi.

== Administrative division ==
Votice consists of 23 municipal parts (in brackets population according to the 2021 census):

- Votice (3,594)
- Amerika (57)
- Beztahov (119)
- Buchov (7)
- Bučovice (24)
- Budenín (101)
- Hory (2)
- Hostišov (35)
- Javor (1)
- Kaliště (34)
- Košovice (17)
- Lysá (20)
- Martinice (62)
- Mladoušov (24)
- Mysletice (34)
- Nazdice (49)
- Nezdice (9)
- Otradovice (60)
- Srbice (82)
- Střelítov (17)
- Větrov (19)
- Vranov (3)
- Zdeboř (1)

== Etymology ==
The settlement was originally named Otice after the founder of the local castle, a lord named Ota. In the mid-16th century, the name was changed to Votice.

== Geography ==
Votice is located about 16 kilometres (10 mi) south of Benešov. It lies in the Vlašim Uplands. The highest point is the hill Na Kozině at 678 m (2,224 ft) above sea level. The territory is rich in small fishponds. The Mastník River flows through the western part of the municipal territory and supplies Velký Mastník, which is the largest of the fishponds.

== History ==
The first written mention of Votice is from 1318, however the archaeological research showed that the town was probably established in the 12th century.

== Demographics ==
Historical population

Year	Pop.	±%
1869	4,816	—
1880	4,424	−8.1%
1890	4,234	−4.3%
1900	4,198	−0.9%
1910	4,124	−1.8%

Year	Pop.	±%
1921	4,141	+0.4%
1930	3,860	−6.8%
1950	3,191	−17.3%
1961	3,578	+12.1%
1970	4,047	+13.1%

Year	Pop.	±%
1980	4,558	+12.6%
1991	4,514	−1.0%
2001	4,462	−1.2%
2011	4,552	+2.0%
2021	4,371	−4.0%

Source: Censuses

== Transport ==
The I/3 road (part of the European route E55), which connects the D1 motorway with Tábor and further continues as the D3 motorway, runs next to the town.

Votice is located on the railway line Tábor–Olbramovice.

== Sights ==
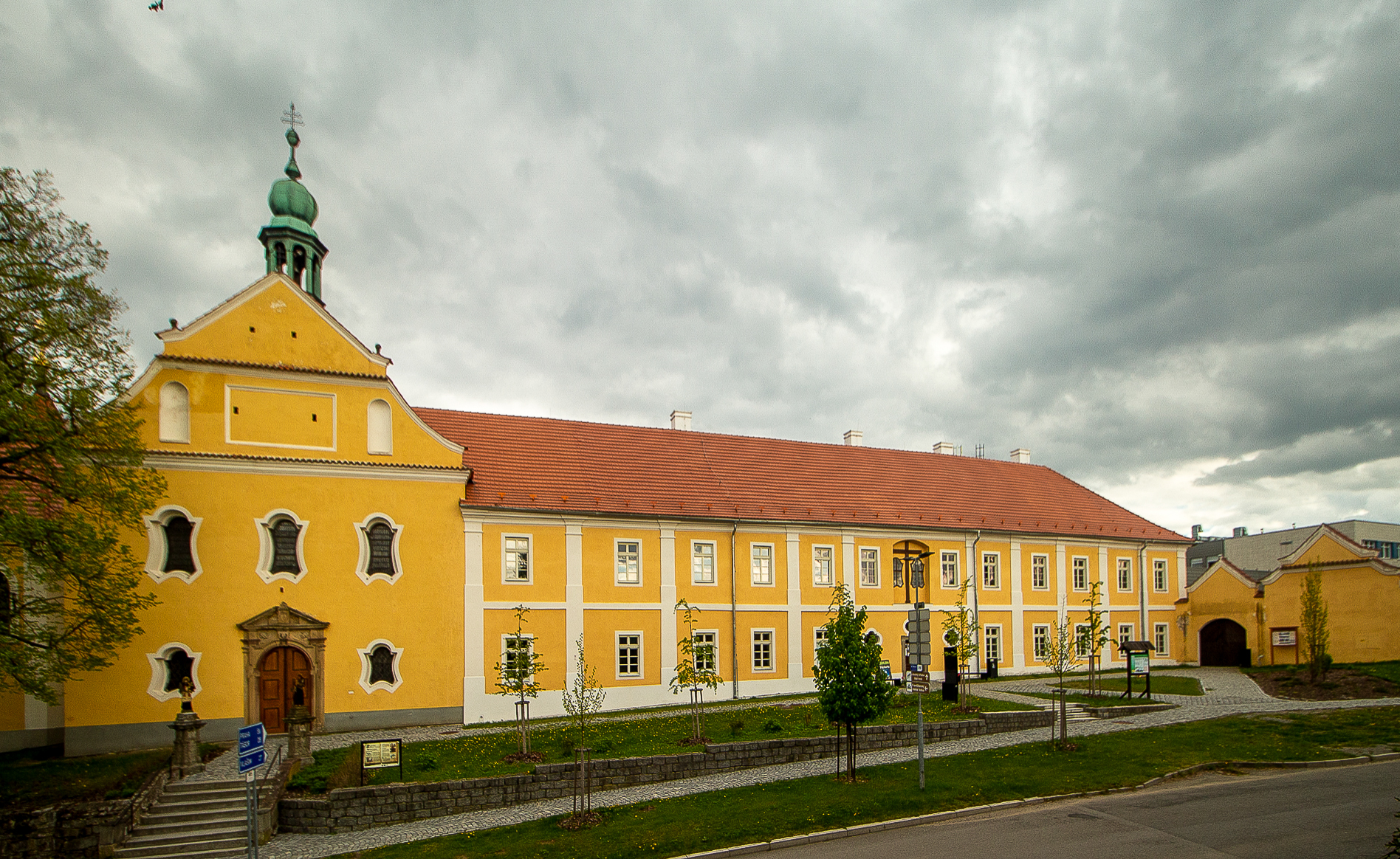
Monastery of Saint Francis of Assisi

The Monastery of Saint Francis of Assisi was founded in 1627 by the then-owner of Votice, Sezima of Vrtba. The Church of St. Francis of Assisi was built next to the monastery in 1629–1631. In the second half of the 18th century, the dilapidated monastery was reconstructed into its current appearance. Today it offers guided tours. One wing of the building houses a museum with several expositions.

The Church of Saint Wenceslaus dates from the 14th century. It was rebuilt in 1731. The massive tower of the church is open to the public as a lookout tower.

The two castles are among the landmarks of the town. The Old Castle is a late Renaissance building that replaced the local fortress. It is abandoned, unused and gradually decaying. The New Castle was built in the 18th century. Today it is privately owned and inaccessible to the public.

== Gallery ==
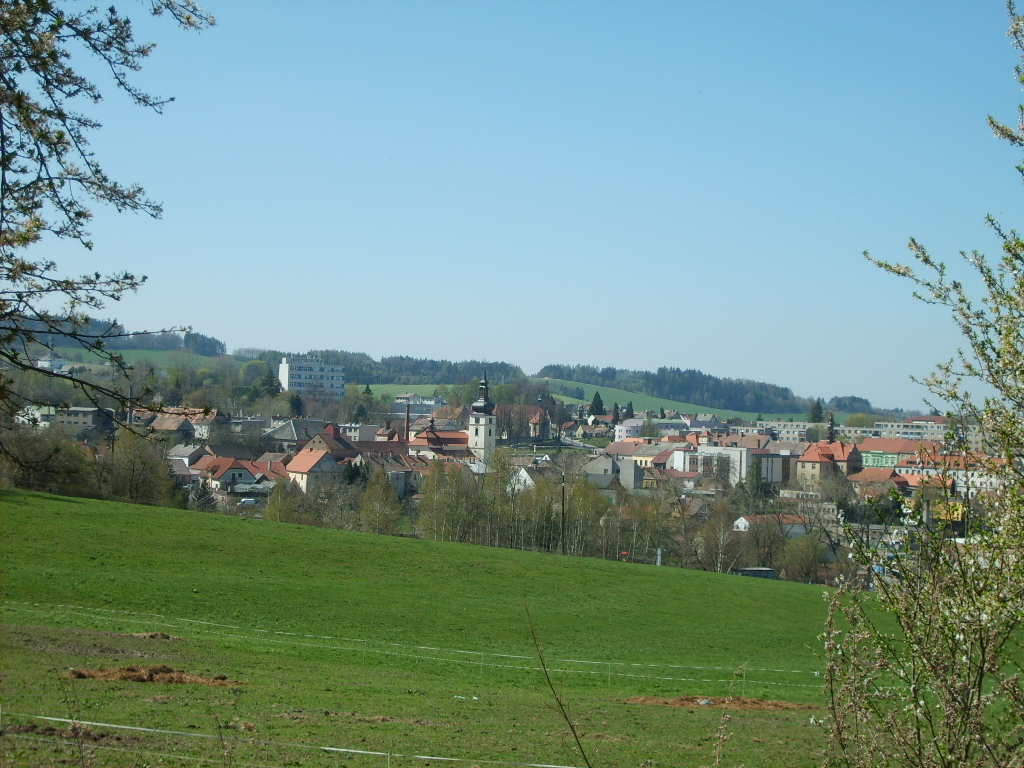
General view

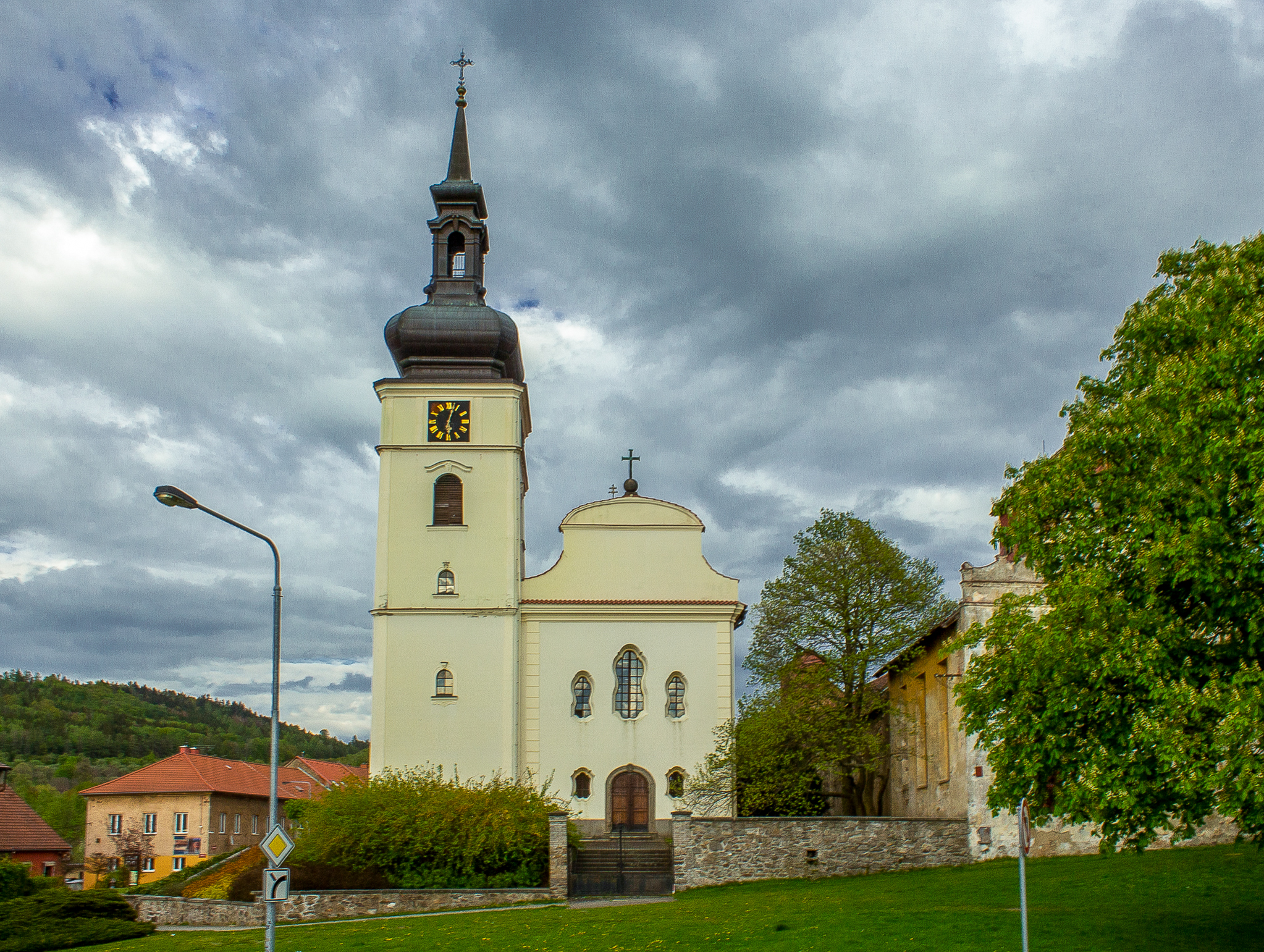
Church of Saint Wenceslaus

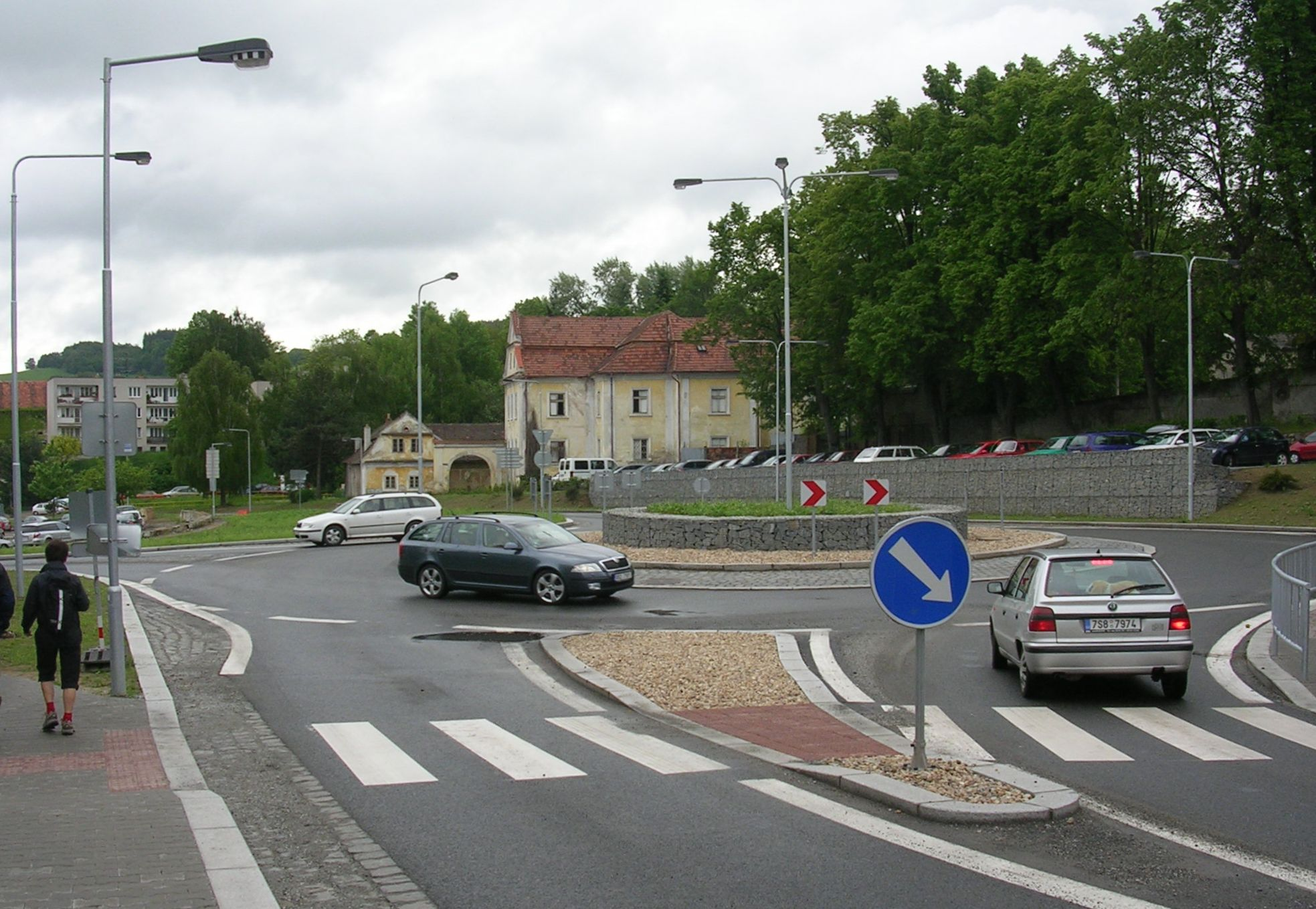
The roundabout and the New Castle
