= Lhotka =

Lhotka may refer to:

== Places in the Czech Republic ==
- Lhotka (Beroun District), a municipality and village in the Central Bohemian Region
- Lhotka (Frýdek-Místek District), a municipality and village in the Moravian-Silesian Region
- Lhotka (Jihlava District), a municipality and village in the Vysočina Region
- Lhotka (Mělník District), a municipality and village in the Central Bohemian Region
- Lhotka (Přerov District), a municipality and village in the Olomouc Region
- Lhotka (Žďár nad Sázavou District), a municipality and village in the Vysočina Region
- Lhotka nad Labem, a municipality and village in the Ústí nad Labem Region
- Lhotka u Litultovic, a municipality and village in the Moravian-Silesian Region
- Lhotka u Radnic, a municipality and village in the Plzeň Region
- Komorní Lhotka, a municipality and village in the Moravian-Silesian Region
- Ostrovec-Lhotka, a municipality and village in the Plzeň Region
- Lhotka (Ostrava), a borough of Ostrava in the Moravian-Silesian Region
- Lhotka, a village and part of Bílovec in the Moravian-Silesian Region
- Lhotka, a village and part of Česká Třebová in the Pardubice Region
- Lhotka, a village and part of Hradčovice in the Zlín Region
- Lhotka, a village and part of Humpolec in the Vysočina Region
- Lhotka, a village and part of Klášterec nad Orlicí in the Pardubice Region
- Lhotka, a village and part of Kostelany in the Zlín Region
- Lhotka, a village and part of Křečovice in the Central Bohemian Region
- Lhotka, a village and part of Křemže in the South Bohemian Region
- Lhotka, a village and part of Lanžov in the Hradec Králové Region
- Lhotka, a village and part of Nekmíř in the Plzeň Region
- Lhotka, a village and part of Obořiště in the Central Bohemian Region
- Lhotka, a village and part of Olešnice (České Budějovice District) in the South Bohemian Region
- Lhotka, a village and part of Ostrovec-Lhotka in the Plzeň Region
- Lhotka, a district of Prague
- Lhotka, a village and part of Ruda (Žďár nad Sázavou District) in the Vysočina Region
- Lhotka, a village and part of Svinaře in the Central Bohemian Region
- Lhotka, a village and part of Tisová (Tachov District) in the Plzeň Region
- Lhotka, a village and part of Vítkov in the Moravian-Silesian Region
- Lhotka, a village and part of Vojkov in the Central Bohemian Region
- Lhotka, a village and part of Zlatá Olešnice (Jablonec nad Nisou District) in the Liberec Region
- Lhotka, a village and part of Zlín in the Zlín Region
- Lhotka nad Bečvou, a village and part of Lešná in the Zlín Region
- Lhotka u Berouna, a village and part of Chyňava in the Central Bohemian Region
- Hranice II-Lhotka, a village and part of Hranice (Přerov District) in the Olomouc Region

== People ==
- Bonny Pierce Lhotka (born 1942), American artist
- Fran Lhotka (1883–1962), Czech-born Croatian composer

== See also ==
- Lhota
- Lhota (disambiguation)
