= Sedlec =

Sedlec may refer to places in the Czech Republic:

- Sedlec (Břeclav District), a municipality and village in the South Moravian Region
- Sedlec (České Budějovice District), a municipality and village in the South Bohemian Region
- Sedlec (Litoměřice District), a municipality and village in the Ústí nad Labem Region
- Sedlec (Mladá Boleslav District), a municipality and village in the Central Bohemian Region
- Sedlec (Plzeň-North District), a municipality and village in the Plzeň Region
- Sedlec (Prague), a district of Prague
- Sedlec (Prague-East District), a municipality and village in the Central Bohemian Region
- Sedlec (Třebíč District), a municipality and village in the Vysočina Region
- Sedlec-Prčice, a town in the Central Bohemian Region
- Sedlec, a part of Karlovy Vary in the Karlovy Vary Region
- Sedlec, a village and part of Korozluky in the Ústí nad Labem Region
- Sedlec, a village and part of Křešice in the Ústí nad Labem Region
- Sedlec, a part of Kutná Hora in the Central Bohemian Region
  - Sedlec Abbey
  - Sedlec Ossuary, a chapel
- Sedlec, a village and part of Lanžov in the Hradec Králové Region
- Sedlec, a village and part of Mšeno in the Central Bohemian Region
- Sedlec, a village and part of Poběžovice in the Plzeň Region
- Sedlec, a village and part of Starý Plzenec in the Plzeň Region
- Sedlec, a village and part of Svatý Jan pod Skalou in the Central Bohemian Region
- Sedlec, a village and part of Temelín in the South Bohemian Region
- Sedlec, a village and part of Vraclav in the Pardubice Region
- Sedlec, a village and part of Žebrák in the Central Bohemian Region
- Sedlec u Radonic, an extinct village and part of Radonice in the Ústí nad Labem Region
