= General von Below =

General von Below may refer to:

- Ernst von Below (1863–1955), Prussian-born Imperial German Army general in World War I
- Fritz von Below (1853–1918), Prussian-born Imperial German Army general in World War I
- Gerd-Paul von Below (1892–1953), German Wehrmacht major general
- Otto von Below (1857–1944), Prussian-born Imperial Imperial German Army general of infantry
