= Below =

Below may refer to:

- Earth
- Ground (disambiguation)
- Soil
- Floor
- Bottom (disambiguation)
- Less than
- Temperatures below freezing
- Hell or underworld

== People with the surname ==
- Ernst von Below (1863–1955), German World War I general
- Fred Below (1926–1988), American blues drummer
- Fritz von Below (1853–1918), German World War I general
- Gerd-Paul von Below (1892-1953), German World War II general
- Otto von Below (1857–1944), German World War I general
- Nicolaus von Below (1907–1983), German adjutant of Adolf Hitler

== Other uses ==
- Below (album), a 2021 album by Beartooth
- Below (film), a 2002 film by David Twohy
- Below (miniseries), a 2026 miniseries
- Below (video game), a video game by Capybara Games
- Below Par Records, a record label
- The Great Below, a song by Nine Inch Nails

== See also ==
- Belov
