= Bujesily =

- Municipality
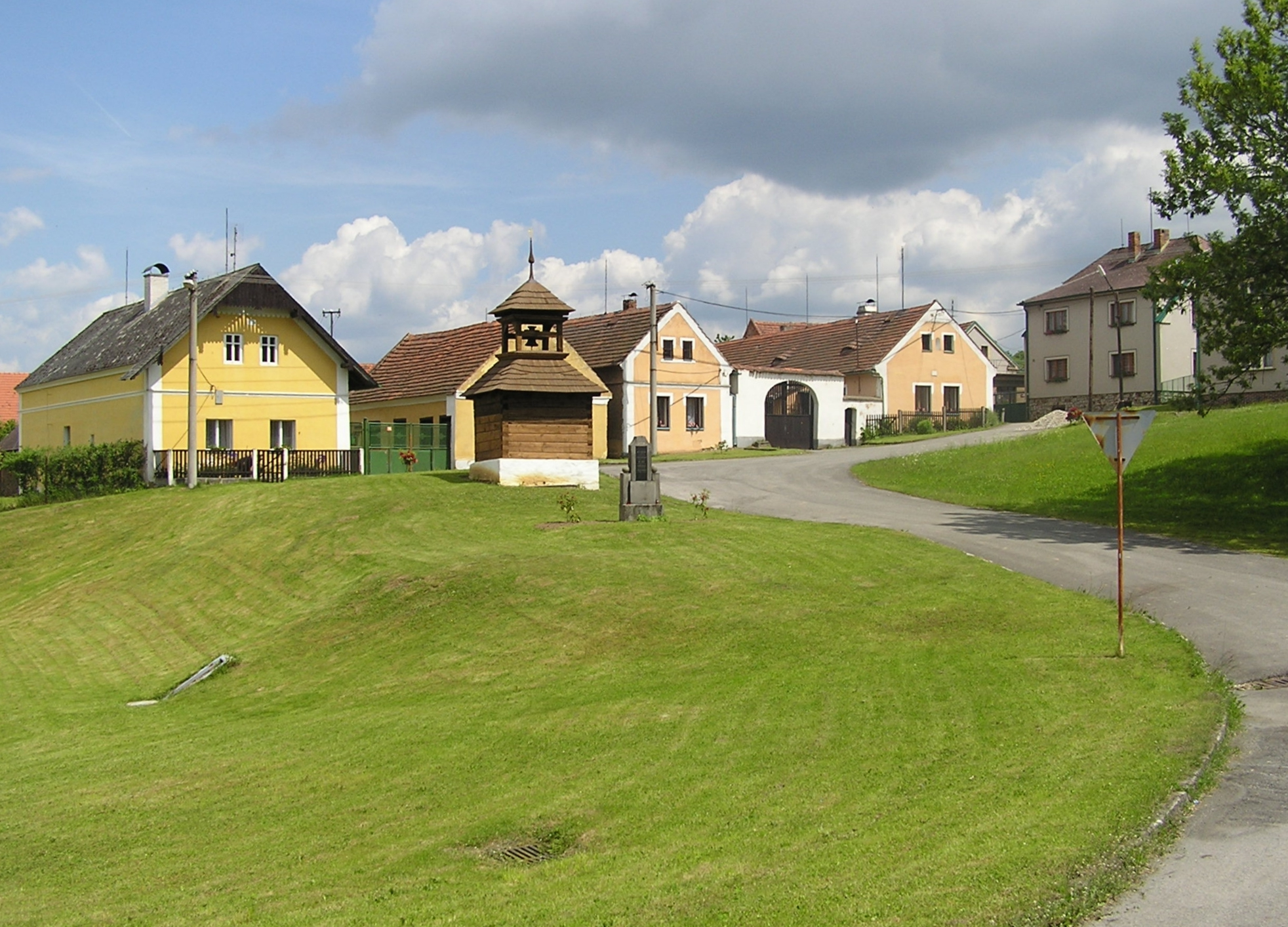
- Centre of Bujesily

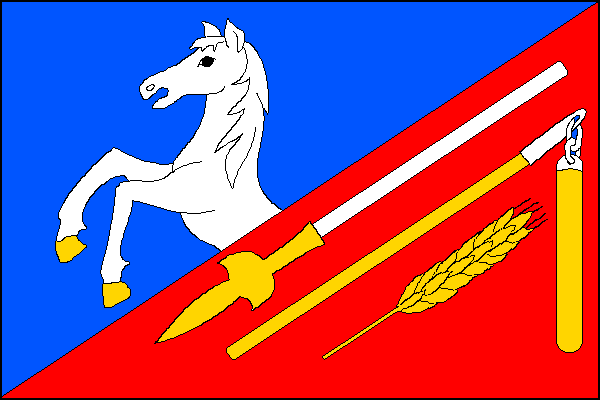
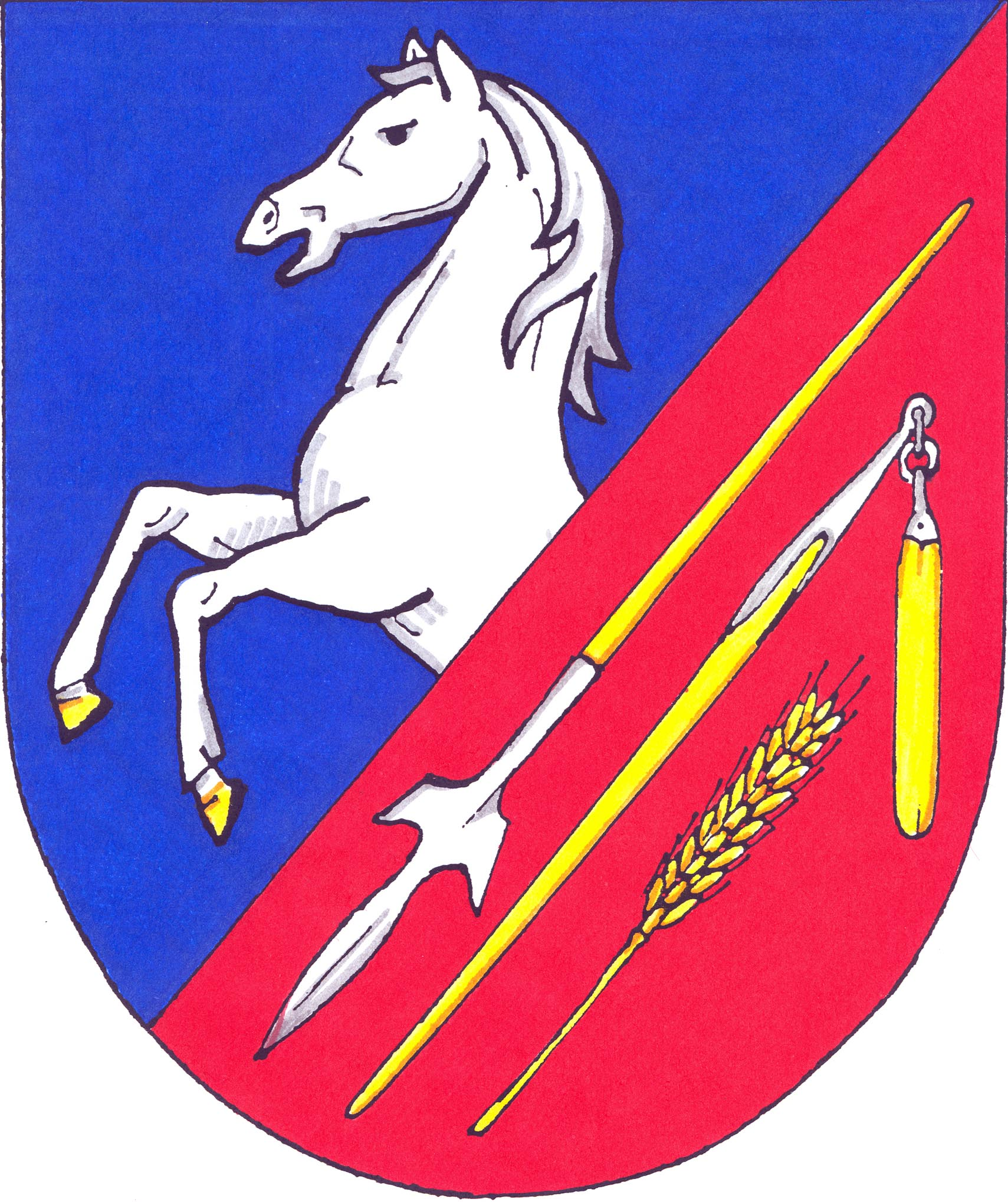
- Flag Coat of arms

- Location in the Czech Republic
- Coordinates: 49°54′53″N 13°34′28″E
- Country: Czech Republic
- Region: Plzeň
- District: Rokycany
- First mentioned: 1227

Area
  - Total: 6.20 km^{2} (2.39 sq mi)
- Elevation: 345 m (1,132 ft)

Population (2026-01-01)
  - Total: 89
  - Density: 14/km^{2} (37/sq mi)
- Time zone: UTC+1 (CET)
  - Summer (DST): UTC+2 (CEST)
- Postal code: 331 41
- Website: www.obecbujesily.cz

Bujesily (German: Bujesil) is a municipality and village in Rokycany District in the Plzeň Region of the Czech Republic. It has about 90 inhabitants.

== Etymology ==
The Old Czech word bujesil referred to a wasteful person. So Bujesily was a village of such people.

== Geography ==
Bujesily is located about 19 kilometres (12 mi) north of Rokycany and 22 km (14 mi) northeast of Plzeň. It lies in the Plasy Uplands. The highest point is the Skalka hill at 397 m (1,302 ft) above sea level. The Berounka River forms the northern municipal border and the stream Radnický potok, its right tributary, forms the eastern border. The Bujesilský potok is a short stream that drains the area of the village.

The village lies on a plateau above the deep valley of the Berounka. The canyon of the Berounka is lined with forest while the area around the village is mostly forestless.

== History ==
The first written mention of Bujesily is from 1227.

From 1848 to 1910, Bujesily was part of Liblín. From 1921 to 1950, it was an independent municipality. From 1961 to 1970, Bujesily was a municipal part of Lhotka u Radnic. From 1 July 1970 to 31 March 1980, it was again an independent municipality. From 1 April 1980 to 28 February 1990, it was a municipal part of Radnice.

== Demographics ==
Historical population

Year	Pop.	±%
1869	202	—
1880	206	+2.0%
1890	170	−17.5%
1900	180	+5.9%
1910	139	−22.8%

Year	Pop.	±%
1921	156	+12.2%
1930	147	−5.8%
1950	109	−25.9%
1961	109	+0.0%
1970	90	−17.4%

Year	Pop.	±%
1980	80	−11.1%
1991	74	−7.5%
2001	67	−9.5%
2011	61	−9.0%
2021	72	+18.0%

Source: Censuses

== Transport ==
There are no railways or major roads passing through the municipality.

== Sights ==
Among the protected cultural monuments in the municipality are a wooden belfry in the centre of the village and the homestead No. 10, which dates from the mid-19th century.
