= Wolfgang W.E. Samuel =

American writer

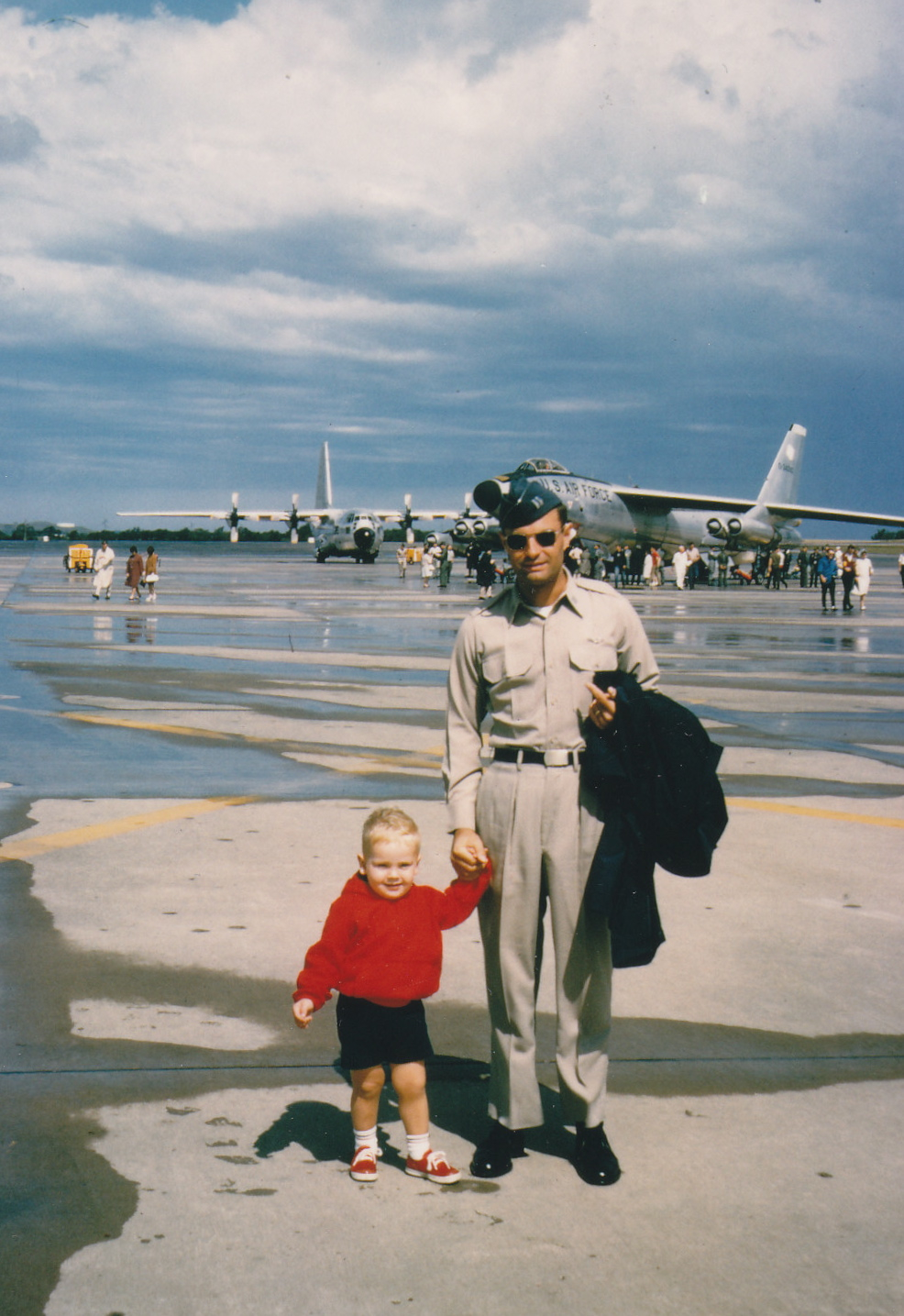
- Wolfgang Samuel and son Charles at Forbes AFB, Kansas, in 1964
- Born: February 2, 1935 (age 91); Strasburg, Germany
- Military career
- Allegiance: United States of America
- Branch: United States Air Force
- Service years: 1960–1985
- Rank: Colonel
- Nickname: Wolf
- Conflicts: Vietnam War; Cold War
- Awards: Distinguished Flying Cross; Air Medal
- Other work: Author

Wolfgang W.E. Samuel (born February 2, 1935) is a German-born American writer and a veteran of the United States Air Force.

== Early years ==
Born in what is now Poland, ten-year-old Samuel, along with his mother and sister, ran from his home town of Sagan (now Żagań in Poland) in 1945 as the Red Army approached. As a Flüchtling (refugee), he underwent privation and re-settlement in the post-war years. His mother was raped repeatedly, and his grandfather was killed by German communists. He describes how he and his mother eventually settled near a U.S. airbase in western Germany, where his mother met and married an American serviceman.

== Military career ==
After the family emigrated to the United States, Samuel attended the University of Colorado at Boulder, graduating with a Bachelor of Science degree in Business in 1960, and subsequently the National War College. He served in the United States Air Force for 30 years, retiring with the rank of colonel in 1985. He was awarded the Distinguished Flying Cross and Air Medal multiple times during his years of active duty. As of 2008, he resided in Fairfax Station, Virginia.

== Author ==
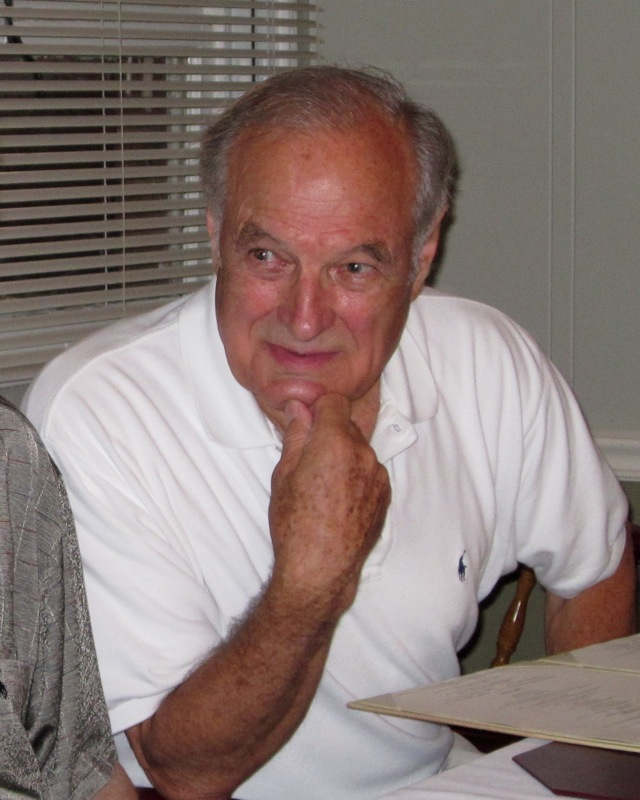
Wolfgang Samuel at the Army Navy Country Club in 2009

As of 2015, Samuel has published eight books. The first, German Boy: A Child in War, is a memoir detailing the war years and his post-war life as a refugee, and features a foreword by historian Stephen Ambrose. His second book, I Always Wanted to Fly: America's Cold War Airmen, is a compilation of oral histories of American aviators of the Cold War era. The War of Our Childhood: Memories of World War II, another oral history compilation, tells of twenty-seven Germans who experienced the war as children. American Raiders: The Race to Capture the Luftwaffe's Secrets, is an account of the efforts made by the United States military to acquire German military technology.

Glory Days: The Untold Story of the Men Who Flew the B-66 Destroyer into the Face of Fear recounts some of the adventures of the often unsung crews of the B-66, RB-66 and EB-66 aircraft. Watson's Whizzer's: Operation Lusty and the Race for Nazi Aviation Technology documents the United States' efforts to obtain German aeronautical breakthroughs at the end of World War II. His most recent work is In Defense of Freedom that describes the sacrifices of America's World War II Army Air Force flyers and their contributions to the Allied victory.

== Works ==
- German Boy: A Refugee's Story. Jackson: University Press of Mississippi, 2000. ISBN 1-57806-482-1
- I Always Wanted to Fly: America's Cold War Airmen. Jackson: University Press of Mississippi, 2001. ISBN 1-57806-399-X
- The War Of Our Childhood: Memories of World War Two. Jackson: University Press of Mississippi, 2002. ISBN 1-57806-482-1
- American Raiders: The Race to Capture the Luftwaffe's Secrets. Jackson: University Press of Mississippi, 2004. ISBN 1-57806-649-2
- Coming to Colorado: A Young Immigrant's Journey to Become an American Flyer. Jackson: University Press of Mississippi, 2006 ISBN 978-1-57806-902-6
- Glory Days: The Untold Story of the Men Who Flew the B-66 Destroyer into the Face of Fear. Schiffer Publishing, Ltd., 2008. ISBN 0-7643-3086-1, ISBN 978-0-7643-3086-5
- Watson's Whizzer's: Operation Lusty and the Race for Nazi Aviation Technology. Schiffer Publishing, Ltd., 2010. ISBN 0-7643-3517-0, ISBN 978-0-7643-3517-4
- In Defense of Freedom: Stories of Courage and Sacrifice of World War II Army Air Forces Flyers. University Press of Mississippi, 2015. ISBN 1628462175, ISBN 978-1628462173
