= Heinz Kindermann =

German politician (born 1942)

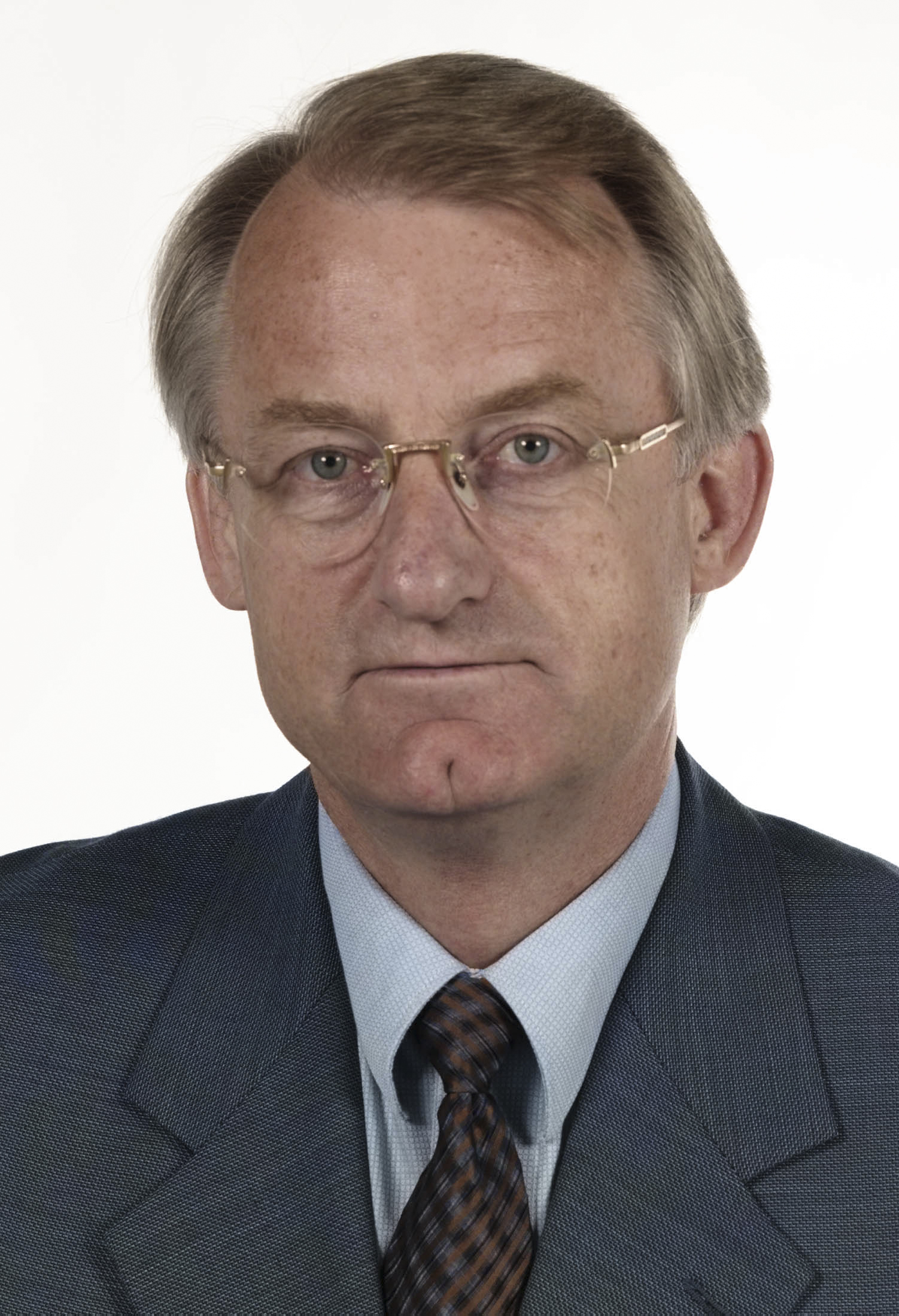
- Kindermann in 1999

Member of the European Parliament for Germany
- In office 19 July 1994 – 14 July 2009

Personal details
- Born: 20 June 1942 (age 83); Welhotta, Nazi Germany (now Lhotka nad Labem, Czech Republic)
- Political party: Social Democratic Party of Germany

Heinz Kindermann (born 20 June 1942) is a German politician who served as a Member of the European Parliament from 1994 until 2009. He is a member of the Social Democratic Party of Germany, part of the Socialist Group.

In parliament, Kindermann served on the Committee on Agriculture and Rural Development and the Committee on Fisheries. He was also a member of the Delegation to the EU-Croatia Joint Parliamentary Committee and a substitute for the Delegation for relations with the countries of south-east Europe.

== Career ==
- 1956–1958: Farming apprenticeship
- 1961–1967: Studied veterinary medicine

== Education ==
- 1968: Doctorate
- 1967–1990: Veterinary doctor in a partnership in Strasburg
- 1990: Specialist qualification for small animals
- 1990–1994: Veterinary official in Strasburg
- 1992: Passed the veterinary officers' civil service examination
- 1992–1994: Head of the district veterinary and food supervisory office of Strasburg
- 1991–1993: Chairman of Strasburg district SPD
- 1991–1992: Head of the Human Justice and Culture of the Minorities
- 1992–1995: Vice-Chairman of Uecker-Randow district SPD
- 1990–1994: Municipal councillor and SPD Group chairman in Strasburg
- 1994–2009: Member of the European Parliament
