= Strasburg, Germany =

Town in Mecklenburg-Vorpommern, Germany

Strasburg
- Town
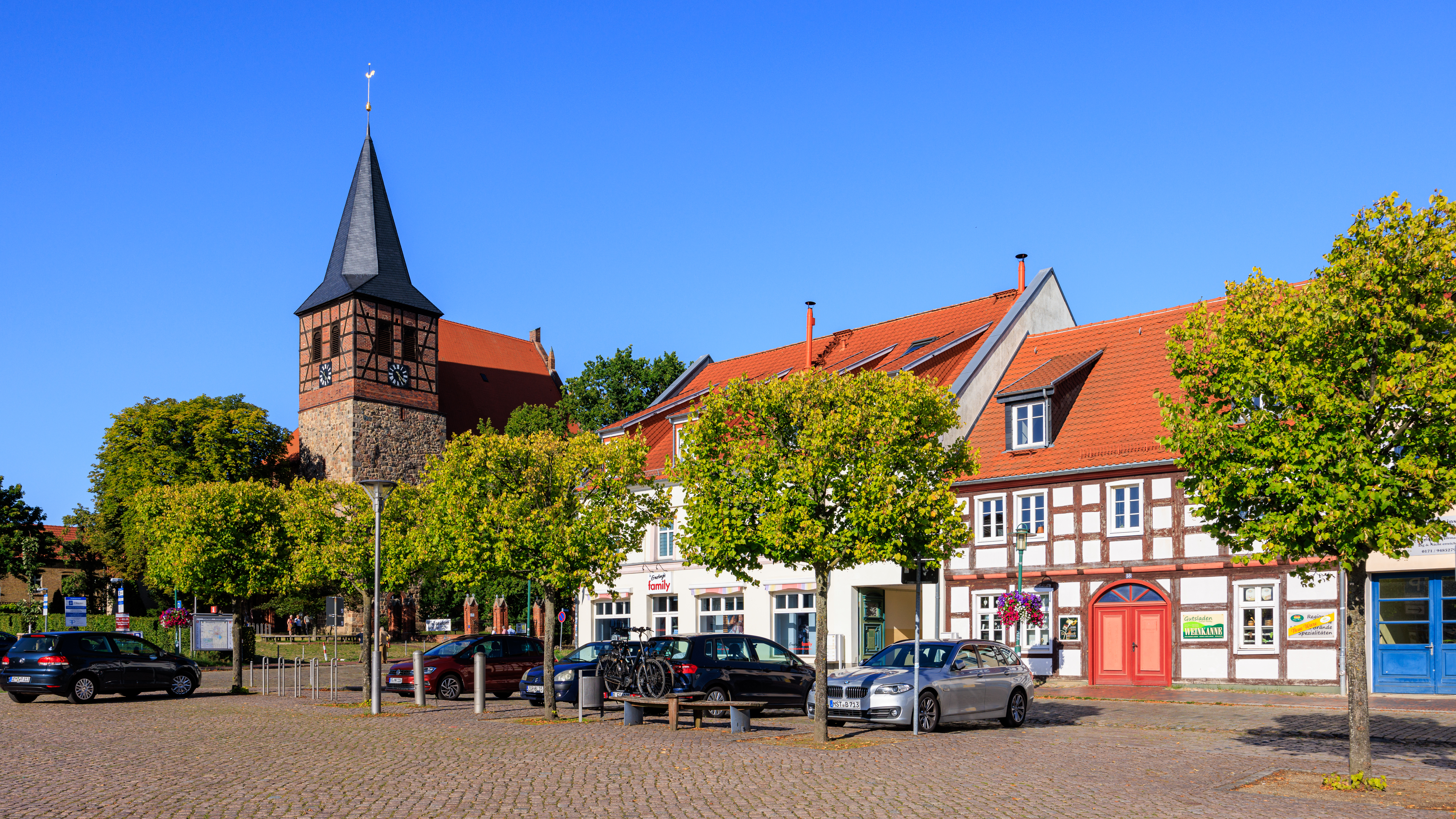
- Market square

- Coat of arms

- Location of Strasburg within Vorpommern-Greifswald district
- Interactive map of Strasburg
- Location within Germany Location within Mecklenburg-Vorpommern
- Coordinates: 53°30′N 13°45′E
- Country: Germany
- State: Mecklenburg-Vorpommern
- District: Vorpommern-Greifswald
- Subdivisions: 11

Government
  - Mayor: Karina Dörk

Area
  - Total: 87.48 km^{2} (33.78 sq mi)
- Elevation: 60 m (200 ft)

Population (2025-12-31)
  - Total: 4,246
  - Density: 48.54/km^{2} (125.7/sq mi)
- Time zone: UTC+01:00 (CET)
  - Summer (DST): UTC+02:00 (CEST)
- Postal codes: 17335
- Dialling codes: 039753
- Vehicle registration: VG, SBG
- Website: www.strasburg.de

Strasburg (German pronunciation: [ˈʃtʁaːsbʊʁk]; officially: Strasburg (Uckermark)) is a town in the Vorpommern-Greifswald district of Mecklenburg-Vorpommern in north-eastern Germany. It is situated in the historic Uckermark region, about 16 kilometres (9.9 miles) west of Pasewalk, and 33 kilometres (21 miles) east of Neubrandenburg.

== History ==
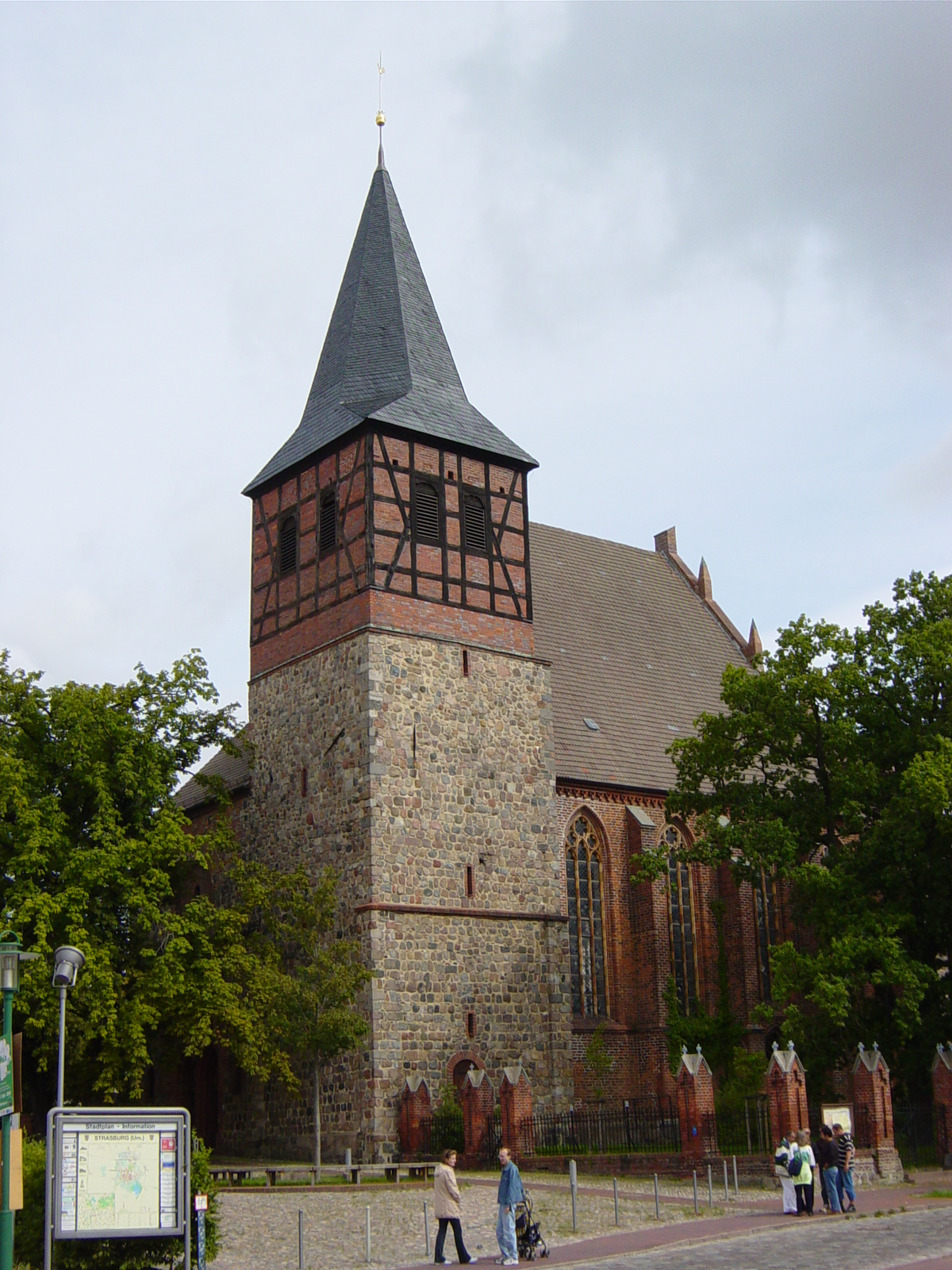
Medieval Saint Mary Church

Straceburch was established in 1267 by Duke Barnim I of Pomerania at a strategically important site near the border with Mecklenburg in the west and the Margraviate of Brandenburg in the south. It was given town privileges and settled with Germans in the course of the Ostsiedlung. The region was affected by the enduring Brandenburg–Pomeranian conflict, and after the Hohenzollern elector Frederick II of Brandenburg had campaigned the territory, the Pomeranian dukes finally were forced to cede Strasburg to him according to the 1479 Treaty of Prenzlau.

The town was a part of the Prussian Province of Brandenburg from the 19th century until in 1952 the East German government established the Bezirk Neubrandenburg comprising the former Brandenburg towns of Prenzlau, Templin and Strasburg. Strasburg then was the capital of a district in its own right, which after the East German Peaceful Revolution of 1989 became part of the state of Mecklenburg-Vorpommern.

Wolfgang Samuel's war memoir, German Boy, is partly set in Strasburg, where Samuel and his mother lived from March 1945 to December 1946.

== International relations ==
Strasburg, Germany is twinned with:

- Brodnica, Poland
- Drawsko Pomorskie, Poland
- Straßburg, Austria

== Personalities ==
- Gerd-Paul von Below (1892–1953), officer in the First World War, Major general of the reserves in the Second World War
- Heinz Kindermann (born 1942), veterinary physician, politician (SPD) and deputy of the European Parliament 1994-2009
