= Lhotka (Žďár nad Sázavou District) =

- Municipality
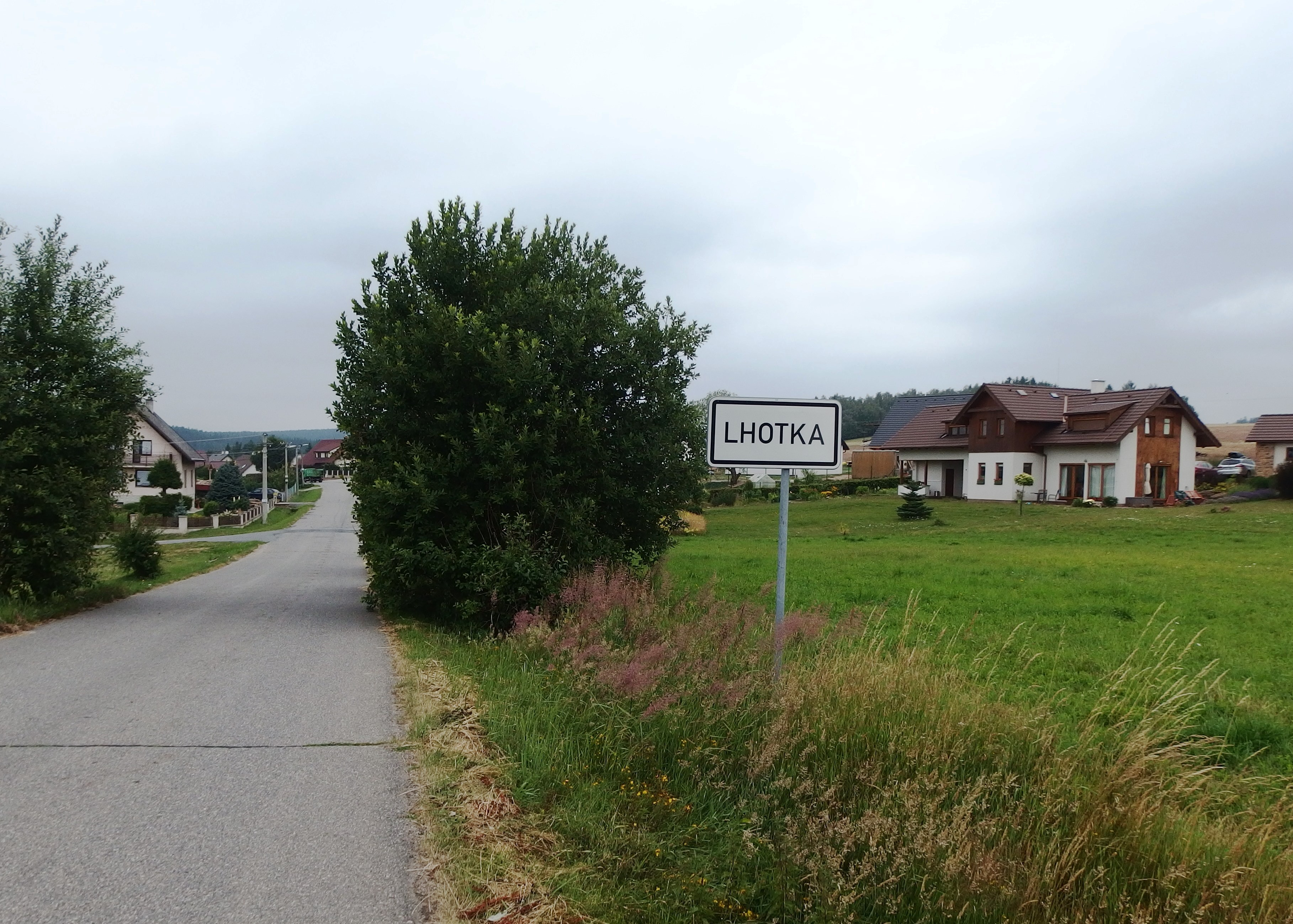
- Southern entrance to Lhotka

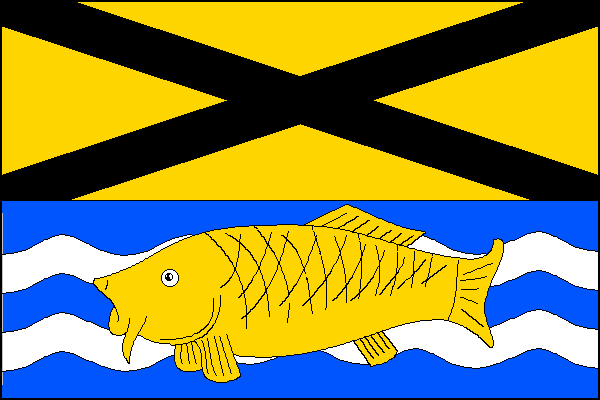
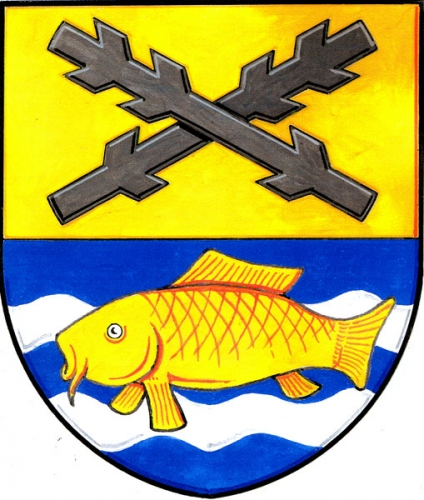
- Flag Coat of arms

- Location in the Czech Republic
- Coordinates: 49°34′56″N 16°0′10″E
- Country: Czech Republic
- Region: Vysočina
- District: Žďár nad Sázavou
- First mentioned: 1407

Area
  - Total: 6.39 km^{2} (2.47 sq mi)
- Elevation: 634 m (2,080 ft)

Population (2026-01-01)
  - Total: 227
  - Density: 35.5/km^{2} (92.0/sq mi)
- Time zone: UTC+1 (CET)
  - Summer (DST): UTC+2 (CEST)
- Postal code: 591 01
- Website: www.obeclhotka.cz

Lhotka is a municipality and village in Žďár nad Sázavou District in the Vysočina Region of the Czech Republic. It has about 200 inhabitants.

Lhotka lies approximately 6 kilometres (4 mi) north-east of Žďár nad Sázavou, 37 km (23 mi) north-east of Jihlava, and 128 km (80 mi) south-east of Prague.

== Demographics ==
Historical population
Year	Pop.	±%
1869	341	—
1880	327	−4.1%
1890	306	−6.4%
1900	307	+0.3%
1910	305	−0.7%
1921	282	−7.5%
1930	265	−6.0%
1950	266	+0.4%
1961	253	−4.9%
1970	218	−13.8%
1980	178	−18.3%
1991	145	−18.5%
2001	138	−4.8%
2011	204	+47.8%
2021	228	+11.8%
Source: Censuses
