= Sedlec (Plzeň-North District) =

- Municipality
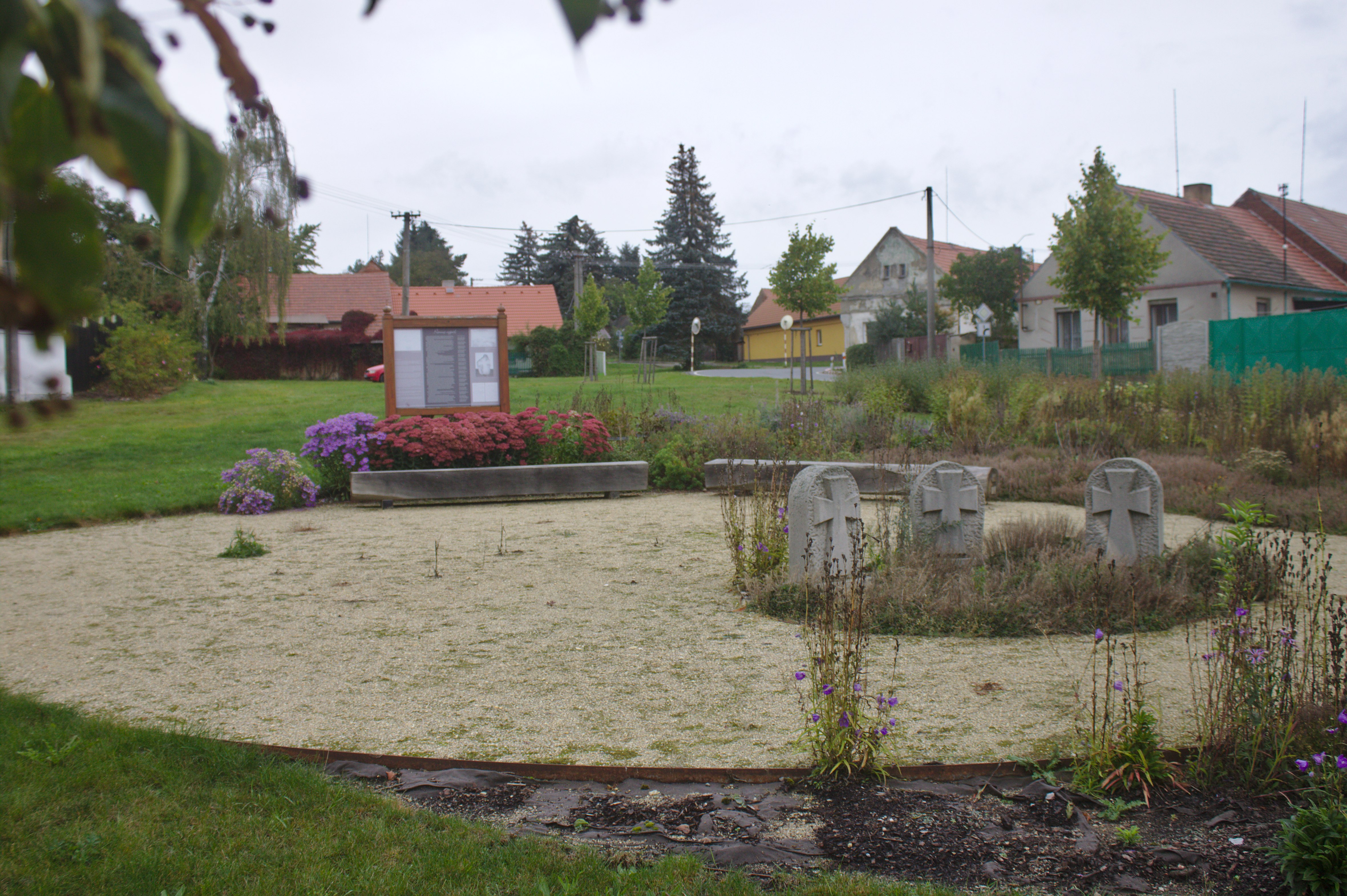
- Centre of Sedlec

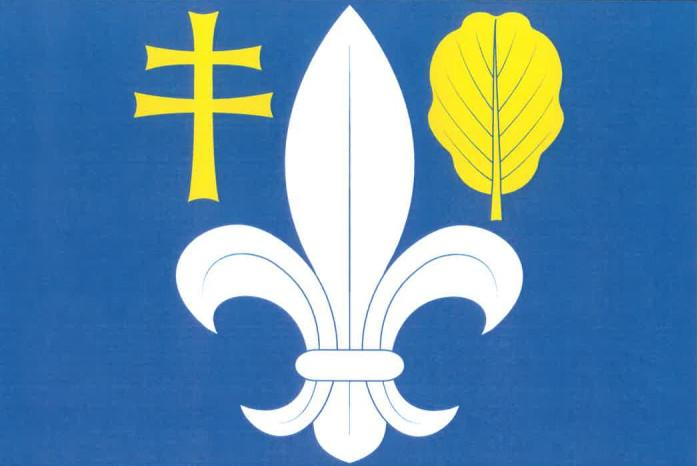
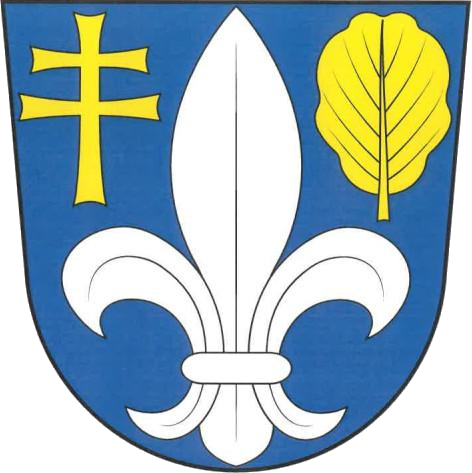
- Flag Coat of arms

- Location in the Czech Republic
- Coordinates: 50°0′23″N 13°25′38″E
- Country: Czech Republic
- Region: Plzeň
- District: Plzeň-North
- First mentioned: 1193

Area
  - Total: 5.97 km^{2} (2.31 sq mi)
- Elevation: 518 m (1,699 ft)

Population (2026-01-01)
  - Total: 112
  - Density: 18.8/km^{2} (48.6/sq mi)
- Time zone: UTC+1 (CET)
  - Summer (DST): UTC+2 (CEST)
- Postal code: 331 41
- Website: www.obec-sedlec.cz

Sedlec is a municipality and village in Plzeň-North District in the Plzeň Region of the Czech Republic. It has about 100 inhabitants.

Sedlec lies approximately 29 kilometres (18 mi) north of Plzeň and 72 km (45 mi) west of Prague.

== History ==
The first written mention of Sedlec is from 1193.

== Demographics ==
Historical population
Year	Pop.	±%
1869	198	—
1880	182	−8.1%
1890	192	+5.5%
1900	178	−7.3%
1910	194	+9.0%
1921	174	−10.3%
1930	184	+5.7%
1950	105	−42.9%
1961	104	−1.0%
1970	110	+5.8%
1980	86	−21.8%
1991	83	−3.5%
2001	75	−9.6%
2011	87	+16.0%
2021	87	+0.0%
Source: Censuses
