= Ostrovec-Lhotka =

- Municipality
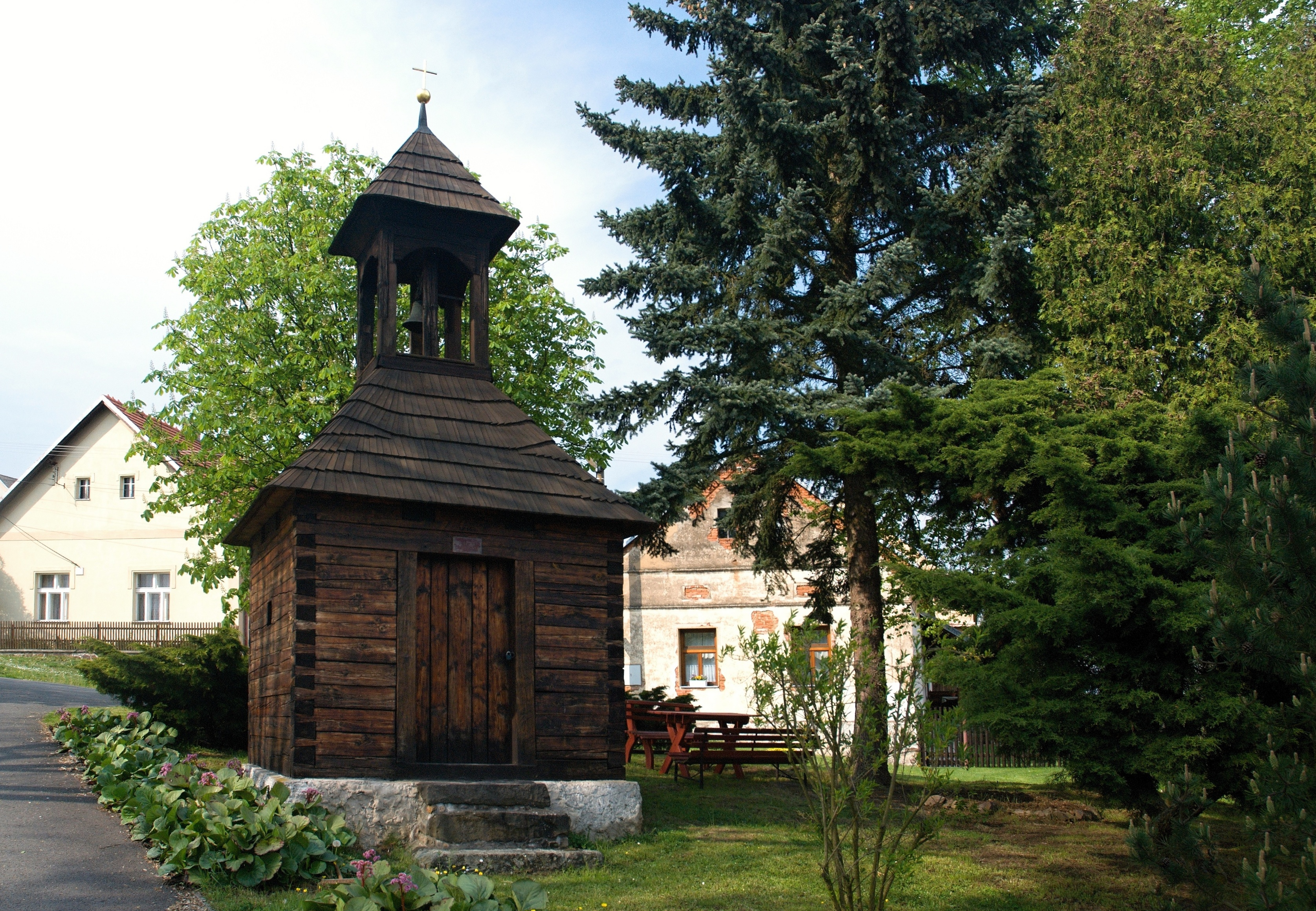
- Belfry in Ostrovec

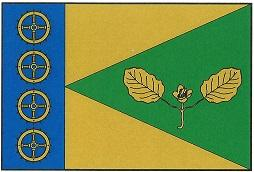
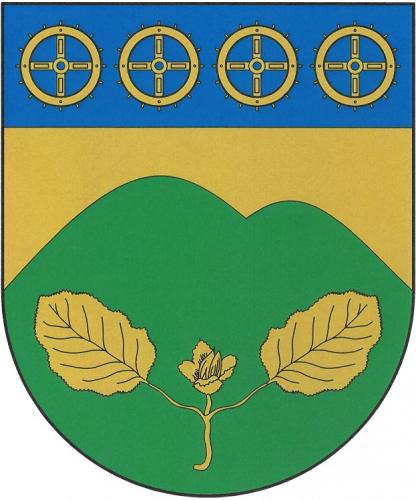
- Flag Coat of arms

- Location in the Czech Republic
- Coordinates: 49°55′5″N 13°43′35″E
- Country: Czech Republic
- Region: Plzeň
- District: Rokycany
- First mentioned: 1115

Area
  - Total: 20.14 km^{2} (7.78 sq mi)
- Elevation: 395 m (1,296 ft)

Population (2026-01-01)
  - Total: 116
  - Density: 5.76/km^{2} (14.9/sq mi)
- Time zone: UTC+1 (CET)
  - Summer (DST): UTC+2 (CEST)
- Postal code: 338 08
- Website: ostrovec-lhotka.cz

Ostrovec-Lhotka is a municipality in Rokycany District in the Plzeň Region of the Czech Republic. It has about 100 inhabitants. The village of Ostrovec is well preserved and is protected as a village monument zone.

Ostrovec-Lhotka lies approximately 11 kilometres (7 mi) east of Rokycany, 26 km (16 mi) east of Plzeň, and 63 km (39 mi) south-west of Prague.

== Administrative division ==
Ostrovec-Lhotka consists of two municipal parts (in brackets population according to the 2021 census):

- Ostrovec (33)
- Lhotka (77)

== Demographics ==
Historical population
Year	Pop.	±%
1869	630	—
1880	464	−26.3%
1890	432	−6.9%
1900	424	−1.9%
1910	381	−10.1%
1921	347	−8.9%
1930	327	−5.8%
1950	221	−32.4%
1961	206	−6.8%
1970	167	−18.9%
1980	125	−25.1%
1991	96	−23.2%
2001	88	−8.3%
2011	115	+30.7%
2021	110	−4.3%
Source: Censuses
