= Lhotka nad Labem =

- Municipality
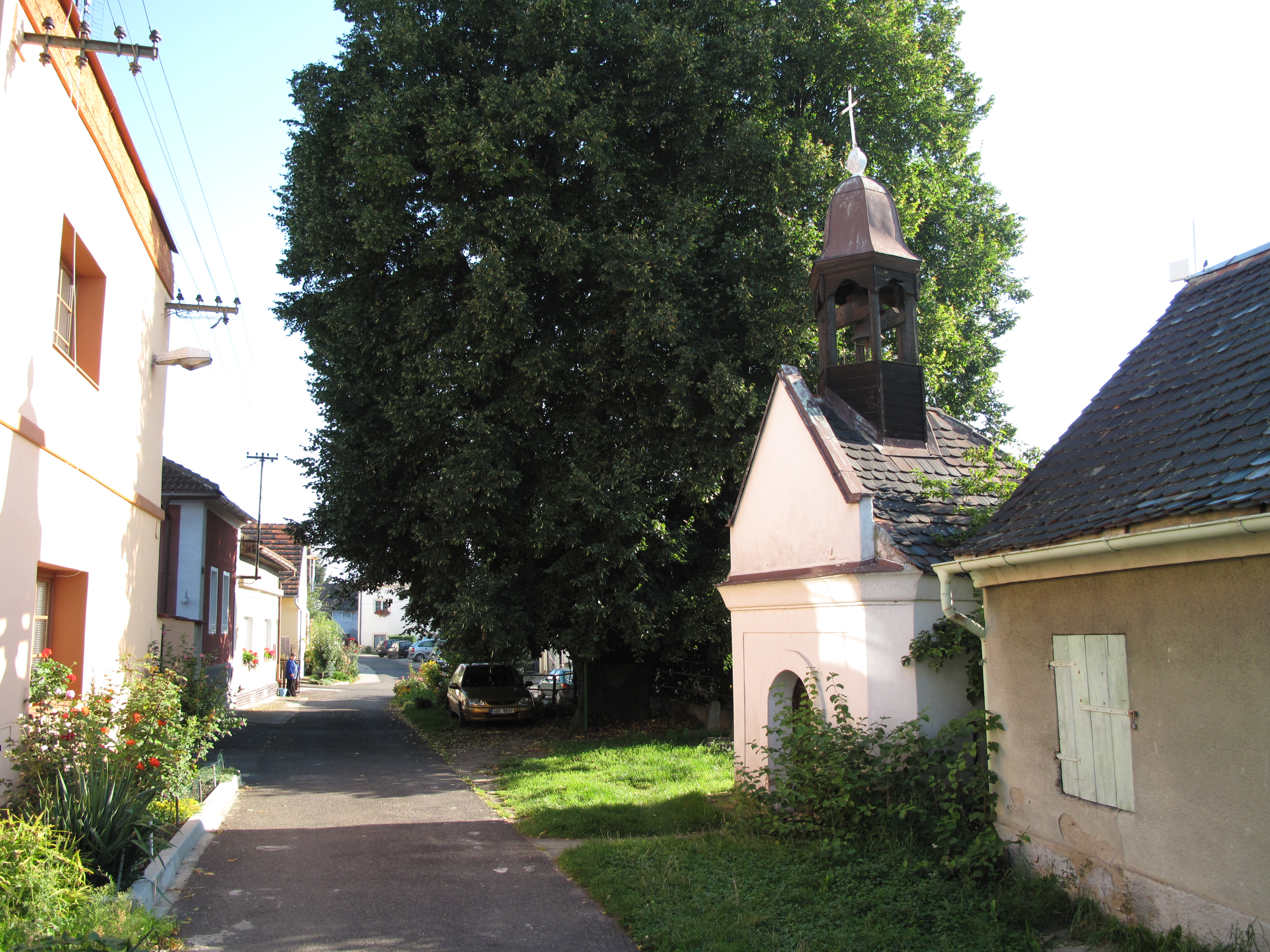
- Chapel of Saint John of Nepomuk

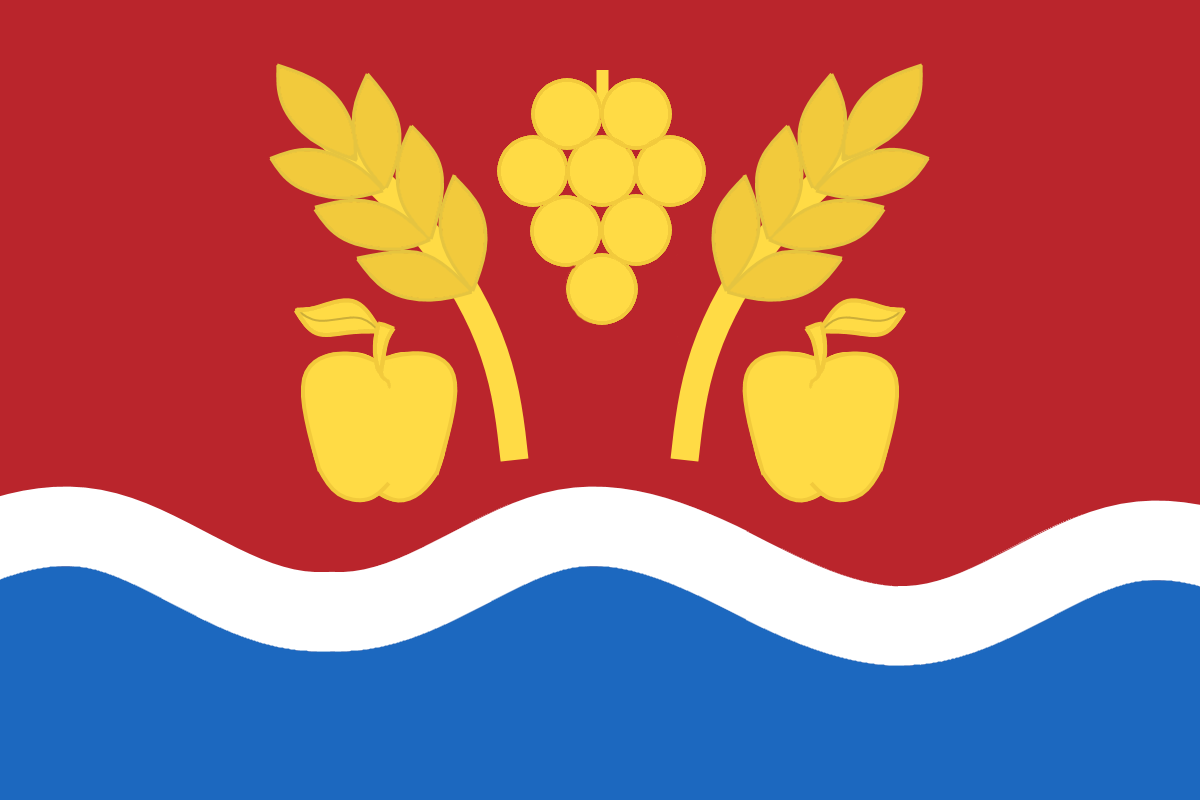
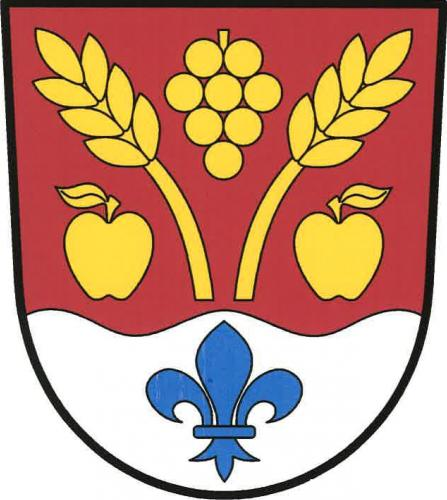
- Flag Coat of arms

- Location in the Czech Republic
- Coordinates: 50°31′32″N 14°2′51″E
- Country: Czech Republic
- Region: Ústí nad Labem
- District: Litoměřice
- First mentioned: 1348

Area
  - Total: 3.01 km^{2} (1.16 sq mi)
- Elevation: 156 m (512 ft)

Population (2026-01-01)
  - Total: 354
  - Density: 118/km^{2} (305/sq mi)
- Time zone: UTC+1 (CET)
  - Summer (DST): UTC+2 (CEST)
- Postal code: 410 02
- Website: www.lhotkanadlabem.cz

Lhotka nad Labem is a municipality and village in Litoměřice District in the Ústí nad Labem Region of the Czech Republic. It has about 400 inhabitants.

Lhotka nad Labem lies approximately 6 kilometres (4 mi) west of Litoměřice, 14 km (9 mi) south of Ústí nad Labem, and 57 km (35 mi) north-west of Prague.

== Demographics ==
Historical population
Year	Pop.	±%
1869	274	—
1880	311	+13.5%
1890	270	−13.2%
1900	293	+8.5%
1910	292	−0.3%
1921	390	+33.6%
1930	418	+7.2%
1950	276	−34.0%
1961	283	+2.5%
1970	270	−4.6%
1980	262	−3.0%
1991	215	−17.9%
2001	243	+13.0%
2011	330	+35.8%
2021	364	+10.3%
Source: Censuses

== Notable people ==
- Heinz Kindermann (born 1942), German politician
