= Lhotka (Jihlava District) =

- Municipality
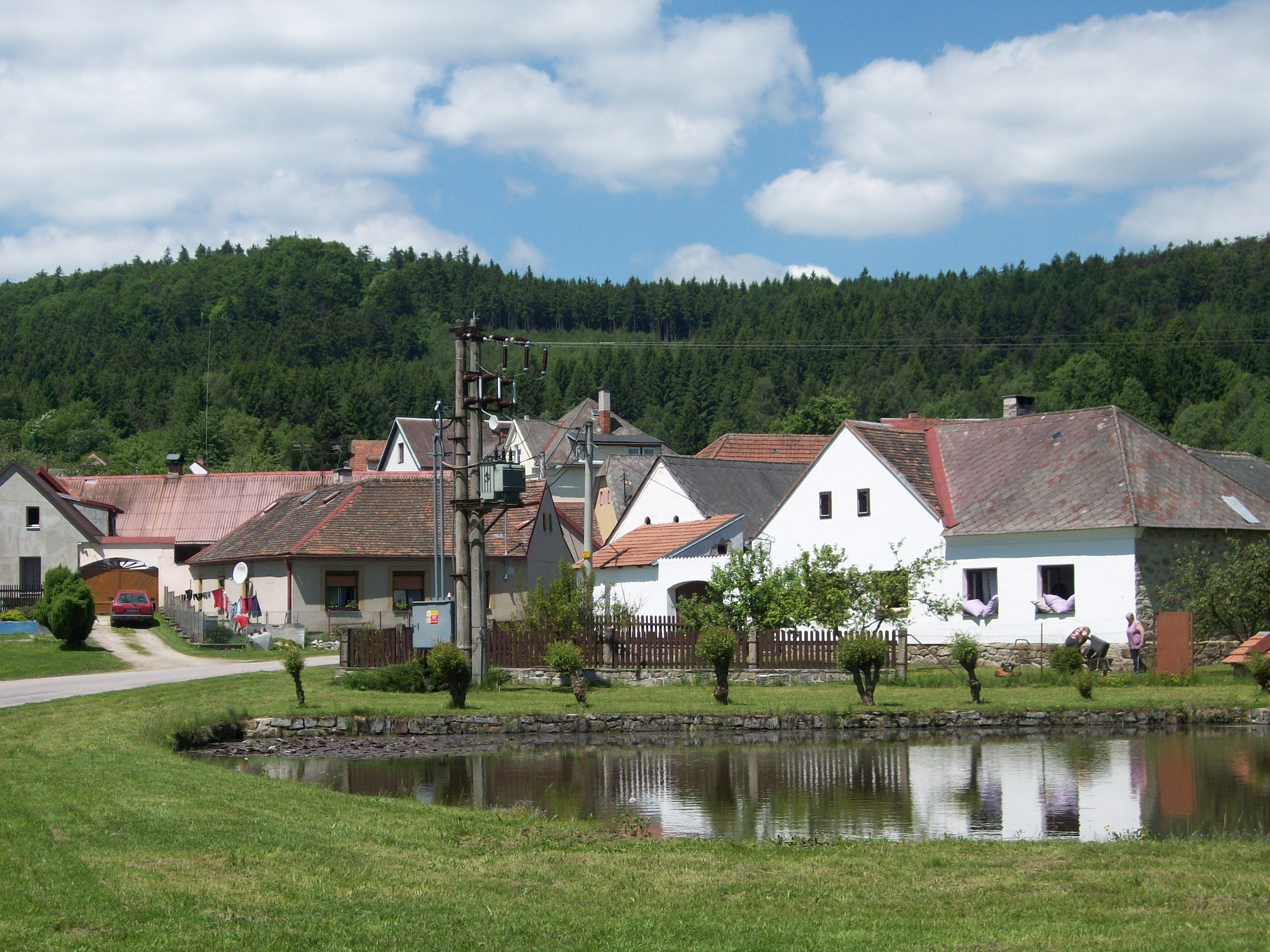
- Centre of Lhotka

- Location in the Czech Republic
- Coordinates: 49°12′33″N 15°23′8″E
- Country: Czech Republic
- Region: Vysočina
- District: Jihlava
- First mentioned: 1385

Area
  - Total: 2.25 km^{2} (0.87 sq mi)
- Elevation: 583 m (1,913 ft)

Population (2026-01-01)
  - Total: 100
  - Density: 44/km^{2} (120/sq mi)
- Time zone: UTC+1 (CET)
  - Summer (DST): UTC+2 (CEST)
- Postal code: 588 56
- Website: www.lhotkatelcsko.cz

Lhotka (Czech pronunciation: [ˈlɦotka]) is a municipality and village in Jihlava District in the Vysočina Region of the Czech Republic. It has about 100 inhabitants.

Lhotka lies approximately 26 kilometres (16 mi) south-west of Jihlava and 120 km (75 mi) south-east of Prague.

== Demographics ==
Historical population
Year	Pop.	±%
1869	148	—
1880	197	+33.1%
1890	176	−10.7%
1900	198	+12.5%
1910	203	+2.5%
1921	176	−13.3%
1930	192	+9.1%
1950	128	−33.3%
1961	136	+6.2%
1970	111	−18.4%
1980	82	−26.1%
1991	90	+9.8%
2001	81	−10.0%
2011	90	+11.1%
2021	94	+4.4%
Source: Censuses
