= Lhotka (Přerov District) =

- Municipality
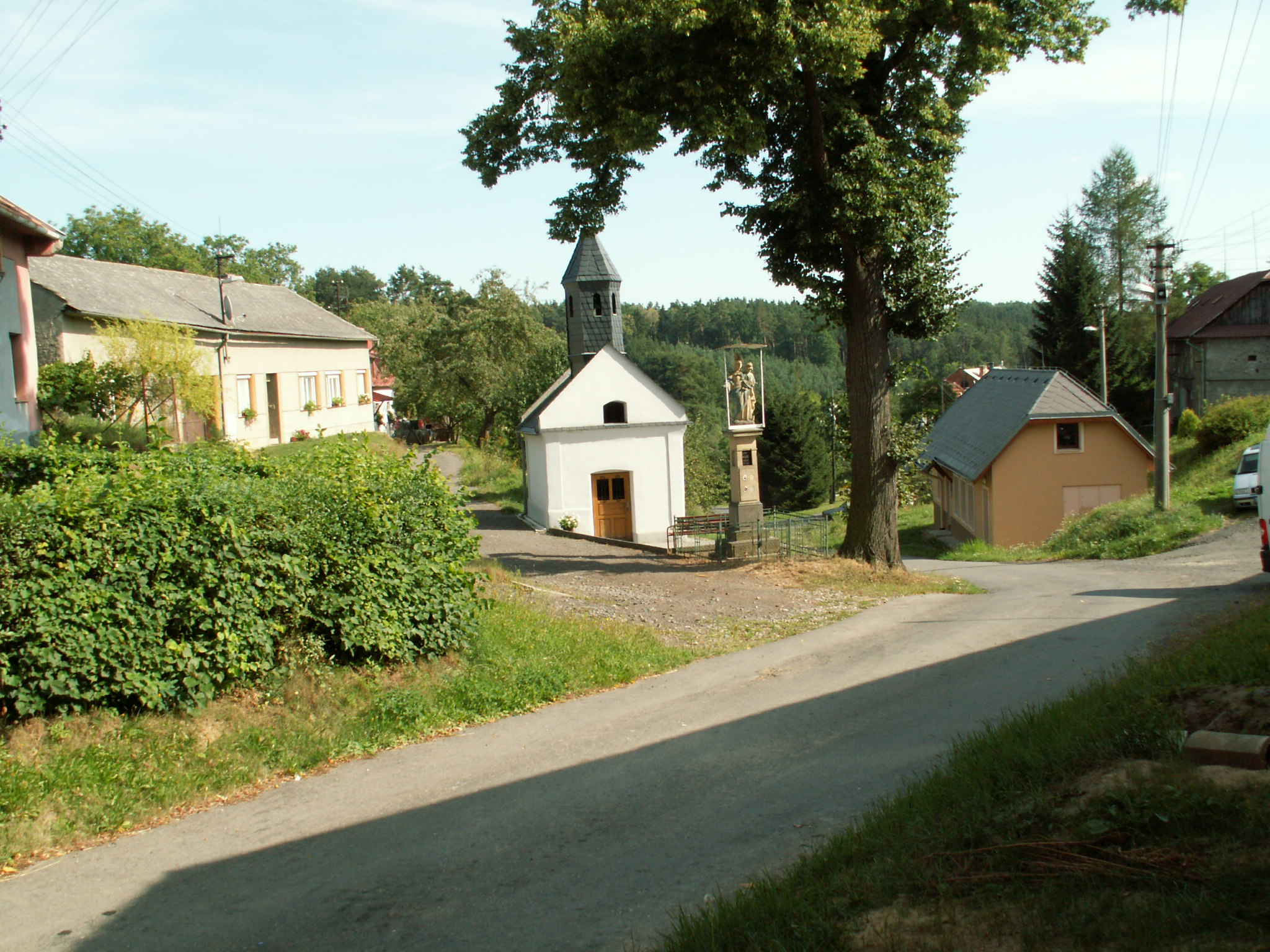
- Centre of Lhotka

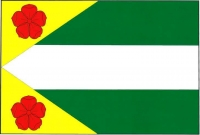
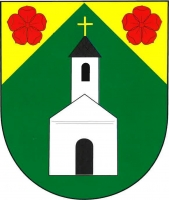
- Flag Coat of arms

- Location in the Czech Republic
- Coordinates: 49°29′59″N 17°24′36″E
- Country: Czech Republic
- Region: Olomouc
- District: Přerov
- First mentioned: 1355

Area
  - Total: 1.90 km^{2} (0.73 sq mi)
- Elevation: 274 m (899 ft)

Population (2026-01-01)
  - Total: 66
  - Density: 35/km^{2} (90/sq mi)
- Time zone: UTC+1 (CET)
  - Summer (DST): UTC+2 (CEST)
- Postal code: 751 24
- Website: www.lhotkauprerova.cz

Lhotka is a municipality and village in Přerov District in the Olomouc Region of the Czech Republic. It has about 70 inhabitants.

Lhotka lies approximately 6 kilometres (4 mi) north-west of Přerov, 16 km (10 mi) south-east of Olomouc, and 225 km (140 mi) east of Prague.

== Demographics ==
Historical population
Year	Pop.	±%
1869	115	—
1880	123	+7.0%
1890	114	−7.3%
1900	109	−4.4%
1910	126	+15.6%
1921	102	−19.0%
1930	131	+28.4%
1950	90	−31.3%
1961	101	+12.2%
1970	82	−18.8%
1980	63	−23.2%
1991	34	−46.0%
2001	40	+17.6%
2011	62	+55.0%
2021	75	+21.0%
Source: Censuses

== Sights ==
There are no protected cultural monuments in the municipality. However, the historic core of the village is well preserved and is protected as a village monument zone. The main cultural landmark is the Chapel of the Holy Guardian Angels.
