= Sedlec (Třebíč District) =

- Municipality
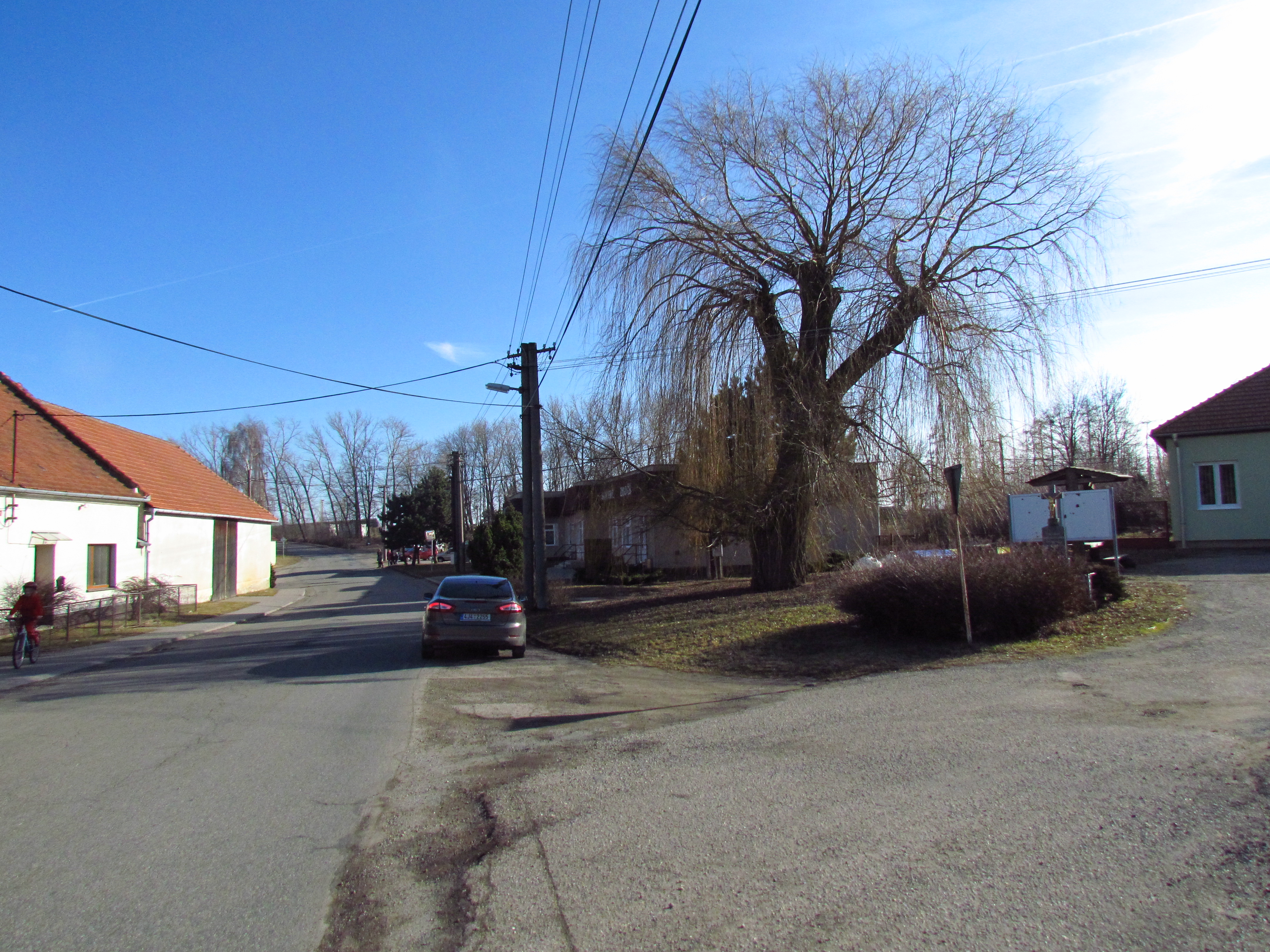
- Centre of Sedlec

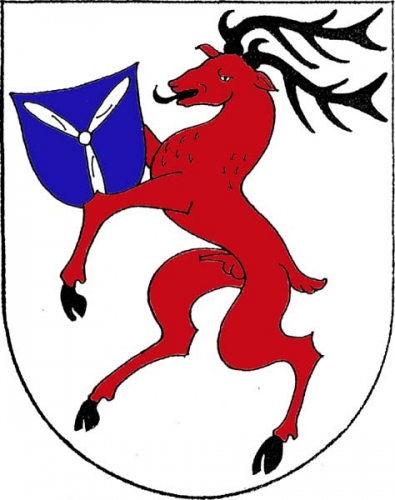
- Flag Coat of arms

- Location in the Czech Republic
- Coordinates: 49°10′3″N 16°8′5″E
- Country: Czech Republic
- Region: Vysočina
- District: Třebíč
- First mentioned: 1101

Area
  - Total: 9.43 km^{2} (3.64 sq mi)
- Elevation: 452 m (1,483 ft)

Population (2026-01-01)
  - Total: 246
  - Density: 26.1/km^{2} (67.6/sq mi)
- Time zone: UTC+1 (CET)
  - Summer (DST): UTC+2 (CEST)
- Postal code: 675 71
- Website: www.obecsedlec.cz

Sedlec is a municipality and village in Třebíč District in the Vysočina Region of the Czech Republic. It has about 200 inhabitants.

Sedlec lies approximately 20 kilometres (12 mi) east of Třebíč, 48 km (30 mi) south-east of Jihlava, and 161 km (100 mi) south-east of Prague.

== Demographics ==
Historical population
Year	Pop.	±%
1869	439	—
1880	456	+3.9%
1890	468	+2.6%
1900	461	−1.5%
1910	446	−3.3%
1921	472	+5.8%
1930	471	−0.2%
1950	385	−18.3%
1961	399	+3.6%
1970	365	−8.5%
1980	321	−12.1%
1991	289	−10.0%
2001	263	−9.0%
2011	235	−10.6%
2021	245	+4.3%
Source: Censuses
