= Ruda (Žďár nad Sázavou District) =

- Municipality
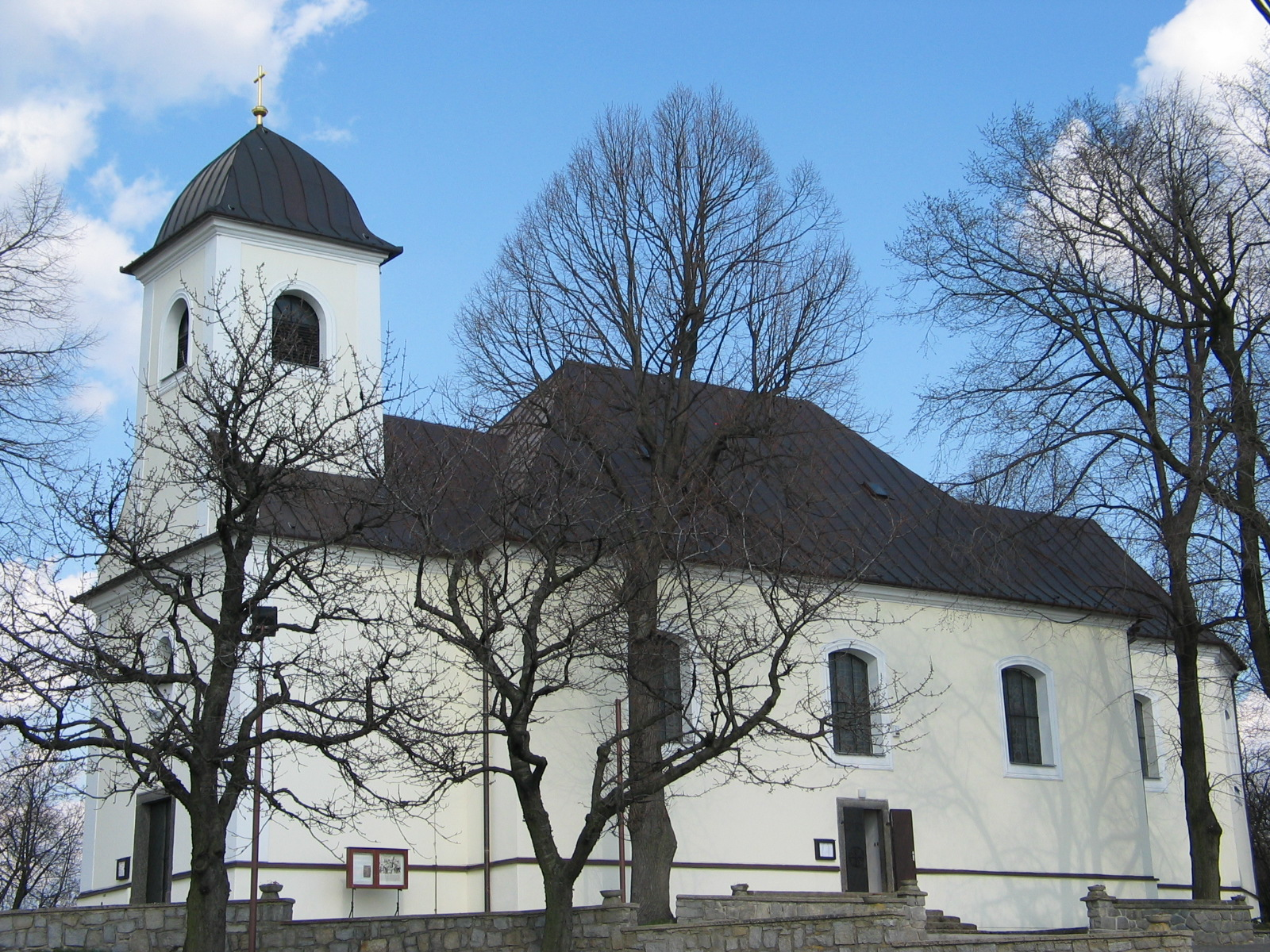
- Church of Saint Giles

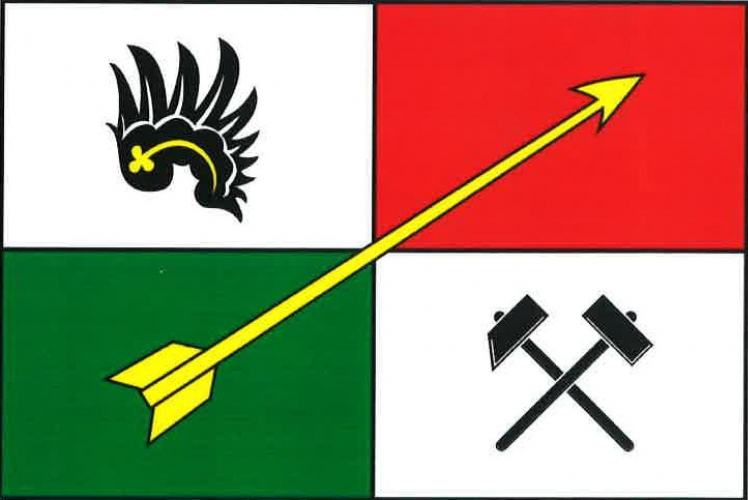
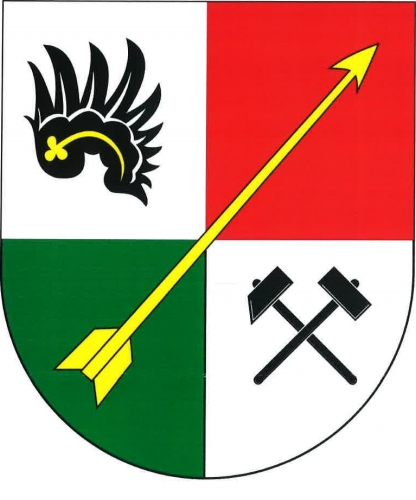
- Flag Coat of arms

- Location in the Czech Republic
- Coordinates: 49°19′21″N 16°7′22″E
- Country: Czech Republic
- Region: Vysočina
- District: Žďár nad Sázavou
- First mentioned: 1353

Area
  - Total: 13.03 km^{2} (5.03 sq mi)
- Elevation: 565 m (1,854 ft)

Population (2026-01-01)
  - Total: 420
  - Density: 32/km^{2} (83/sq mi)
- Time zone: UTC+1 (CET)
  - Summer (DST): UTC+2 (CEST)
- Postal code: 594 01
- Website: www.obecruda.eu

Ruda is a municipality and village in Žďár nad Sázavou District in the Vysočina Region of the Czech Republic. It has about 400 inhabitants.

Ruda lies approximately 30 kilometres (19 mi) south-east of Žďár nad Sázavou, 40 km (25 mi) east of Jihlava, and 149 km (93 mi) south-east of Prague.

== Administrative division ==
Ruda consists of two municipal parts (in brackets population according to the 2021 census):

- Ruda (346)
- Lhotka (36)

== Demographics ==
Historical population
Year	Pop.	±%
1869	508	—
1880	528	+3.9%
1890	559	+5.9%
1900	541	−3.2%
1910	543	+0.4%
1921	533	−1.8%
1930	527	−1.1%
1950	409	−22.4%
1961	421	+2.9%
1970	343	−18.5%
1980	391	+14.0%
1991	367	−6.1%
2001	357	−2.7%
2011	337	−5.6%
2021	382	+13.4%
Source: Censuses
