= Sedlec (Mladá Boleslav District) =

- Municipality
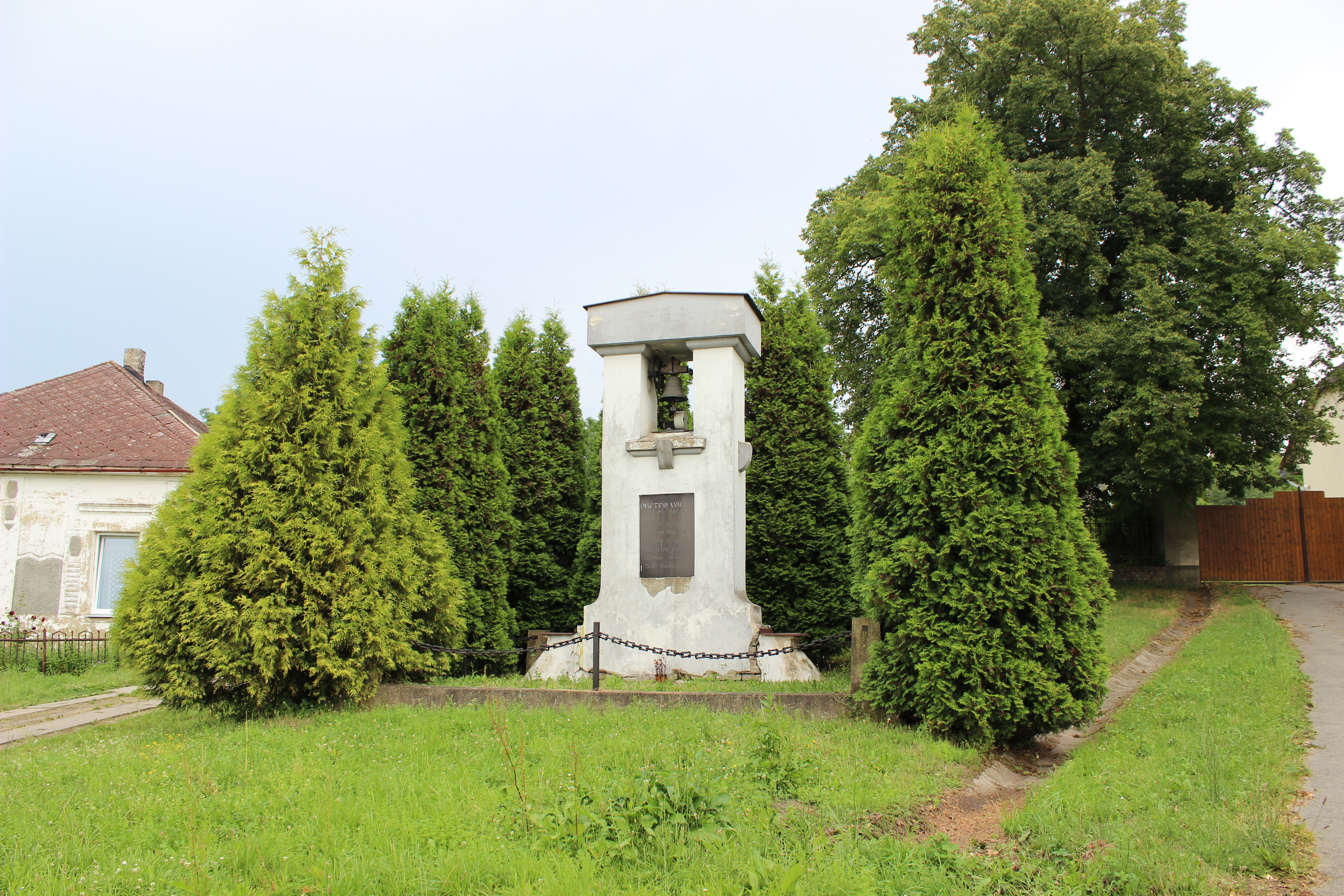
- Memorial to the fallen in World War I

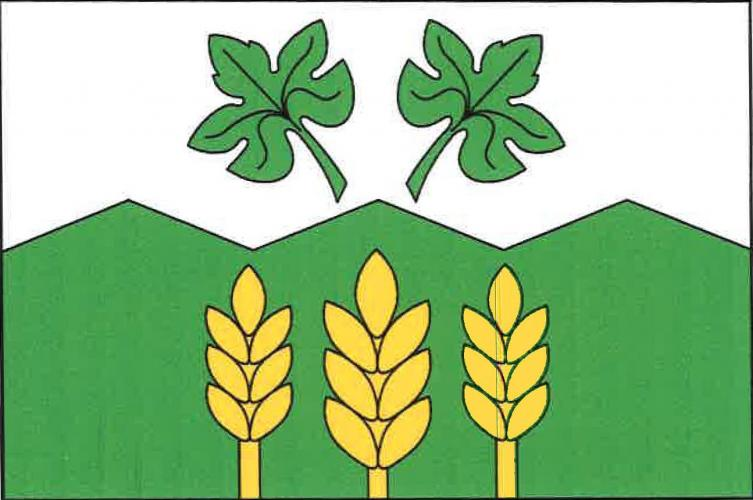
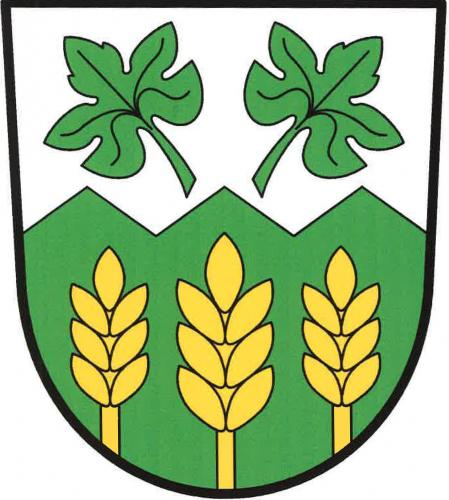
- Flag Coat of arms

- Location in the Czech Republic
- Coordinates: 50°18′3″N 14°47′45″E
- Country: Czech Republic
- Region: Central Bohemian
- District: Mladá Boleslav
- First mentioned: 1227

Area
  - Total: 5.01 km^{2} (1.93 sq mi)
- Elevation: 225 m (738 ft)

Population (2026-01-01)
  - Total: 256
  - Density: 51.1/km^{2} (132/sq mi)
- Time zone: UTC+1 (CET)
  - Summer (DST): UTC+2 (CEST)
- Postal code: 294 71
- Website: www.sedlec.org

Sedlec is a municipality and village in Mladá Boleslav District in the Central Bohemian Region of the Czech Republic. It has about 300 inhabitants.

== Demographics ==
Historical population
Year	Pop.	±%
1869	239	—
1880	270	+13.0%
1890	244	−9.6%
1900	340	+39.3%
1910	384	+12.9%
1921	397	+3.4%
1930	444	+11.8%
1950	290	−34.7%
1961	283	−2.4%
1970	293	+3.5%
1980	196	−33.1%
1991	180	−8.2%
2001	179	−0.6%
2011	220	+22.9%
2021	238	+8.2%
Source: Censuses
