= Tisová (Tachov District) =

- Municipality
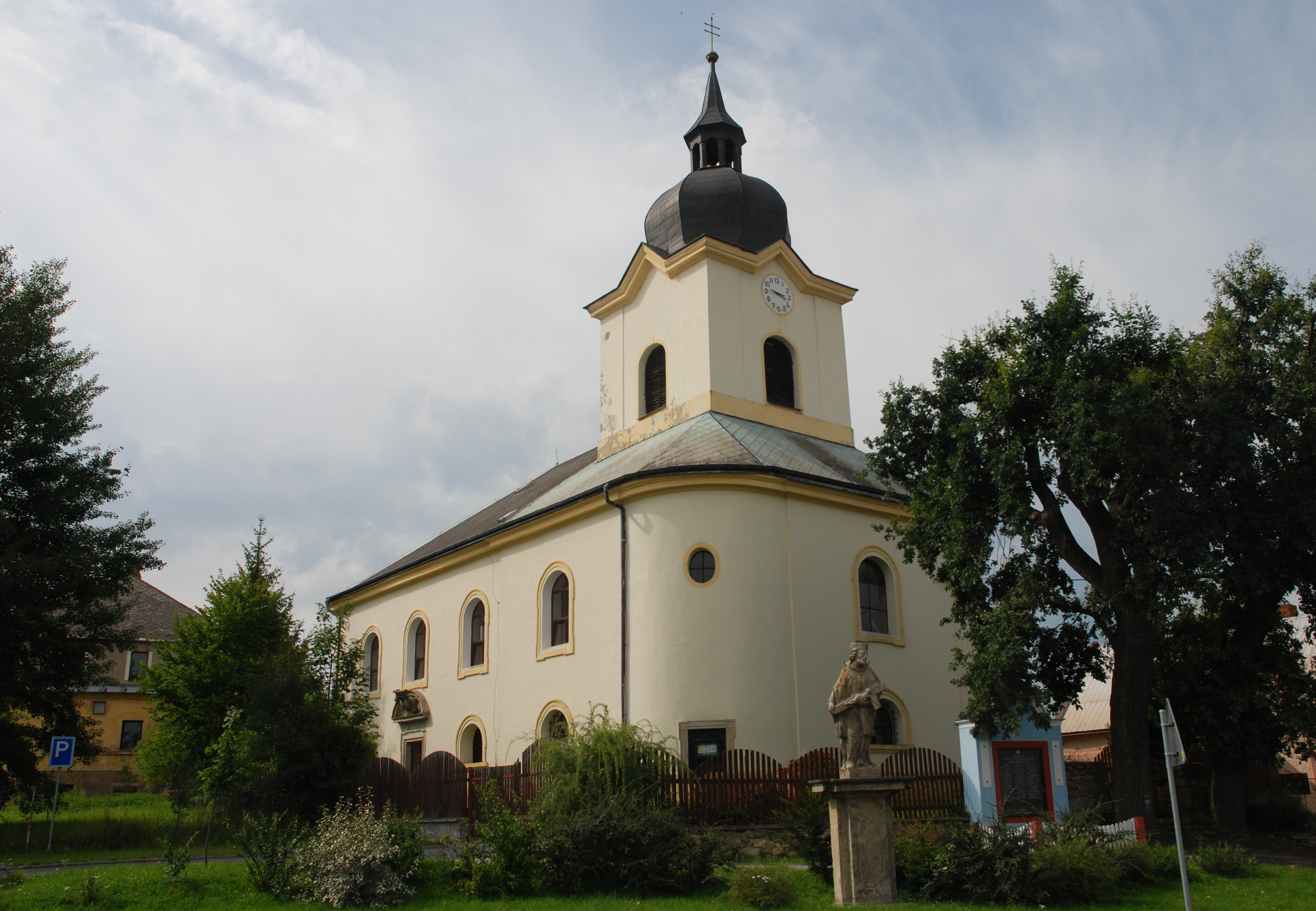
- Church of Saint Nicholas

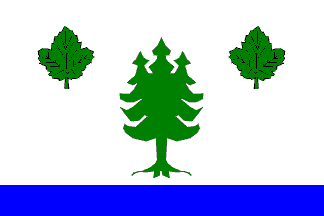
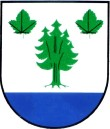
- Flag Coat of arms

- Location in the Czech Republic
- Coordinates: 49°45′55″N 12°42′50″E
- Country: Czech Republic
- Region: Plzeň
- District: Tachov
- First mentioned: 1233

Area
  - Total: 19.89 km^{2} (7.68 sq mi)
- Elevation: 501 m (1,644 ft)

Population (2026-01-01)
  - Total: 542
  - Density: 27.2/km^{2} (70.6/sq mi)
- Time zone: UTC+1 (CET)
  - Summer (DST): UTC+2 (CEST)
- Postal code: 348 01
- Website: www.tisova.eu

Tisová (German: Tissa) is a municipality and village in Tachov District in the Plzeň Region of the Czech Republic. It has about 500 inhabitants.

Tisová lies approximately 9 kilometres (6 mi) south-east of Tachov, 48 km (30 mi) west of Plzeň, and 128 km (80 mi) west of Prague.

== Administrative division ==
Tisová consists of six municipal parts (in brackets population according to the 2021 census):

- Tisová (242)
- Hlinné (22)
- Jemnice (35)
- Kumpolec (9)
- Lhotka (62)
- Trnová (71)

== Demographics ==
Historical population
Year	Pop.	±%
1869	1,219	—
1880	1,178	−3.4%
1890	1,161	−1.4%
1900	1,143	−1.6%
1910	1,132	−1.0%
1921	1,132	+0.0%
1930	1,074	−5.1%
1950	443	−58.8%
1961	474	+7.0%
1970	495	+4.4%
1980	402	−18.8%
1991	417	+3.7%
2001	465	+11.5%
2011	450	−3.2%
2021	441	−2.0%
Source: Censuses
