= Vojkov =

- Municipality
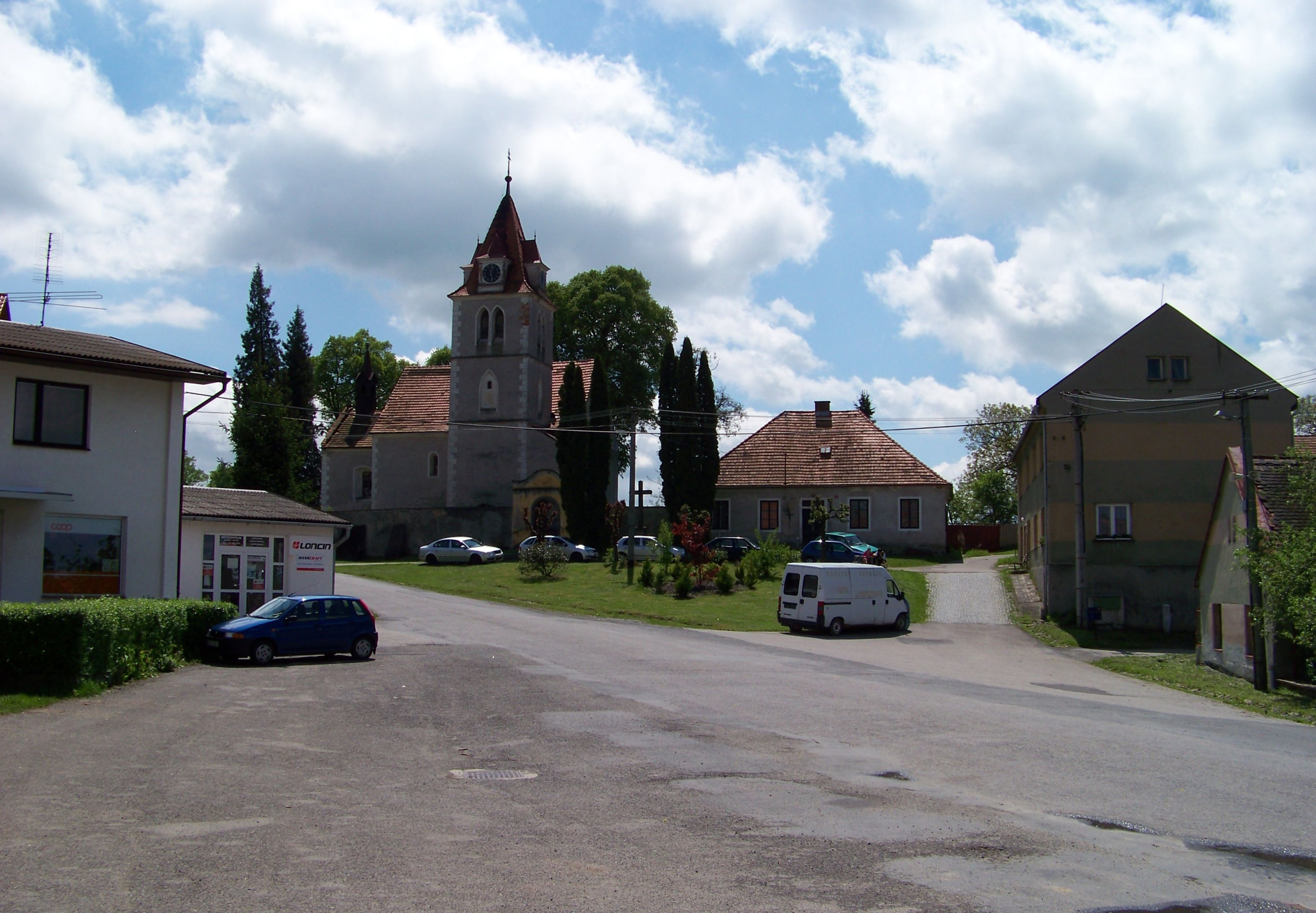
- Church of Saint James the Great and rectory in the centre of Vojkov

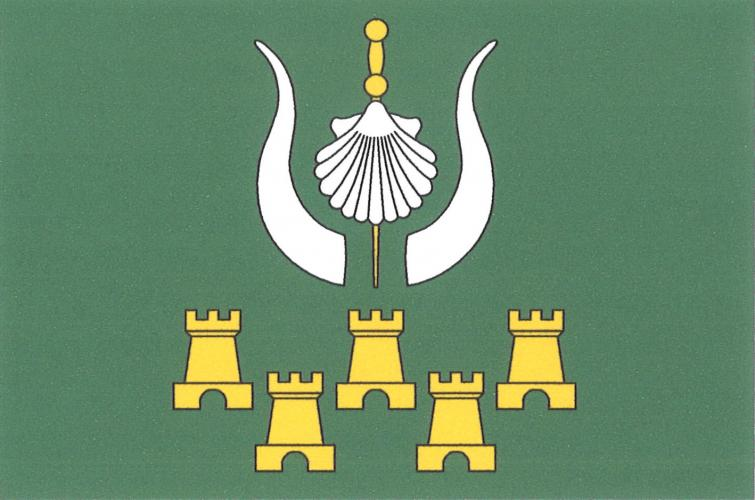
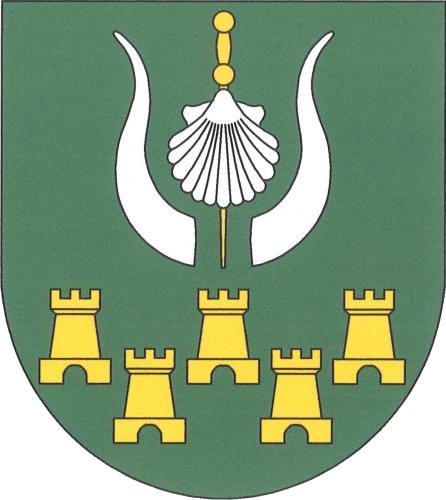
- Flag Coat of arms

- Location in the Czech Republic
- Coordinates: 49°39′8″N 14°31′11″E
- Country: Czech Republic
- Region: Central Bohemian
- District: Benešov
- First mentioned: 1350

Area
  - Total: 15.54 km^{2} (6.00 sq mi)
- Elevation: 453 m (1,486 ft)

Population (2026-01-01)
  - Total: 490
  - Density: 32/km^{2} (82/sq mi)
- Time zone: UTC+1 (CET)
  - Summer (DST): UTC+2 (CEST)
- Postal codes: 257 53, 259 01
- Website: www.ouvojkov.cz

Vojkov is a municipality and village in Benešov District in the Central Bohemian Region of the Czech Republic. It has about 500 inhabitants.

== Administrative division ==
Vojkov consists of nine municipal parts (in brackets population according to the 2021 census):

- Vojkov (334)
- Bezmíř (57)
- Křenovice (14)
- Lhotka (3)
- Minartice (49)
- Podolí (19)
- Sledovice (40)
- Voračice (4)
- Zahrádka (32)

== Demographics ==
Historical population
Year	Pop.	±%
1869	1,201	—
1880	1,149	−4.3%
1890	1,095	−4.7%
1900	1,033	−5.7%
1910	992	−4.0%
1921	967	−2.5%
1930	881	−8.9%
1950	702	−20.3%
1961	765	+9.0%
1970	724	−5.4%
1980	648	−10.5%
1991	553	−14.7%
2001	481	−13.0%
2011	564	+17.3%
2021	552	−2.1%
Source: Censuses
