= Svinaře =

- Municipality
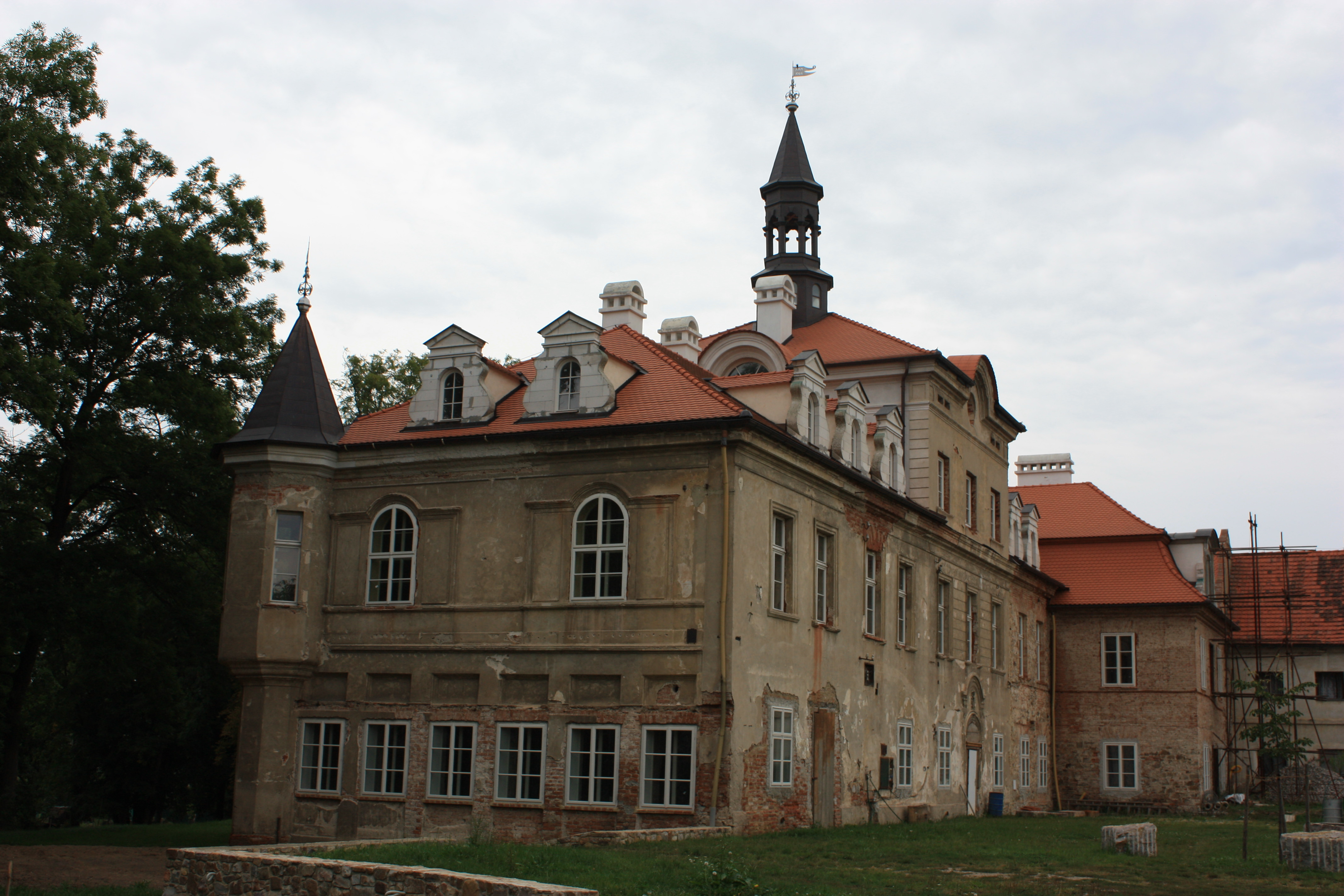
- Svinaře Castle

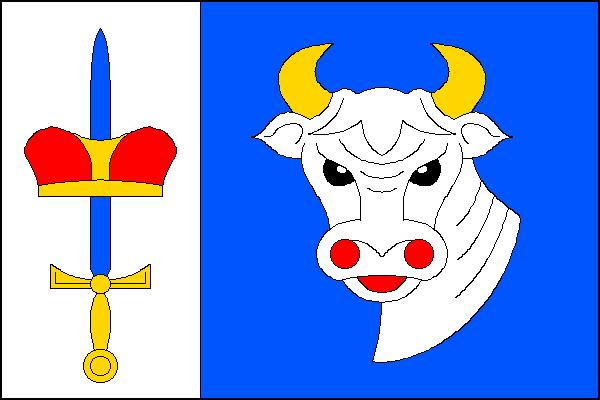
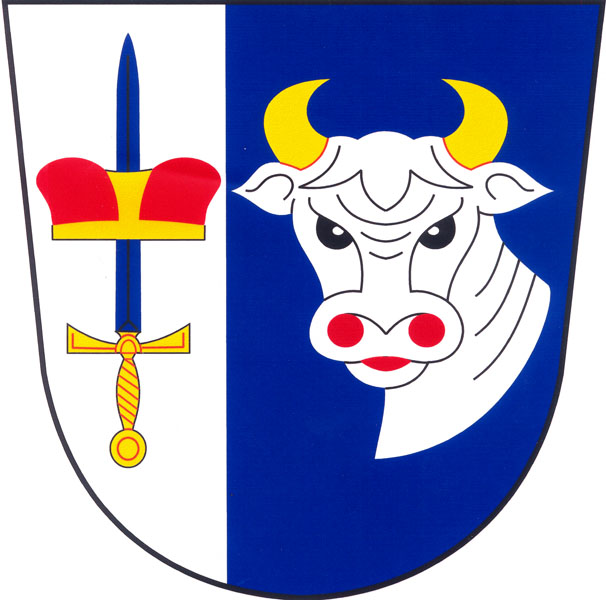
- Flag Coat of arms

- Location in the Czech Republic
- Coordinates: 49°53′30″N 14°11′4″E
- Country: Czech Republic
- Region: Central Bohemian
- District: Beroun
- First mentioned: 1088

Area
  - Total: 7.47 km^{2} (2.88 sq mi)
- Elevation: 293 m (961 ft)

Population (2026-01-01)
  - Total: 1,013
  - Density: 136/km^{2} (351/sq mi)
- Time zone: UTC+1 (CET)
  - Summer (DST): UTC+2 (CEST)
- Postal codes: 267 27, 267 28
- Website: www.svinare.cz

Svinaře is a municipality and village in Beroun District in the Central Bohemian Region of the Czech Republic. It has about 1,000 inhabitants.

== Administrative division ==
Svinaře consists of three municipal parts (in brackets population according to the 2021 census):

- Svinaře (441)
- Halouny (399)
- Lhotka (129)

== Demographics ==
Historical population
Year	Pop.	±%
1869	954	—
1880	893	−6.4%
1890	811	−9.2%
1900	942	+16.2%
1910	764	−18.9%
1921	756	−1.0%
1930	792	+4.8%
1950	589	−25.6%
1961	543	−7.8%
1970	467	−14.0%
1980	387	−17.1%
1991	265	−31.5%
2001	276	+4.2%
2011	581	+110.5%
2021	969	+66.8%
Source: Censuses
