= Bonny Pierce Lhotka =

American painter

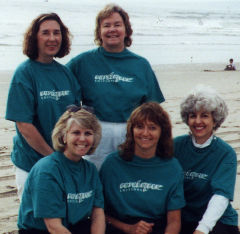
- Unique Editions, tradigital art collective of the 1990s: top, left to right: Bonny Lhotka, Judith Moncrieff; bottom, left to right: Dorothy Krause, Karin Schminke, Helen Golden
- Born: 1942 (age 83–84); La Grange, Illinois
- Education: Bradley University
- Known for: digital print

Bonny Pierce Lhotka (born 1942) is a painter and mixed-media artist, and tradigital art.

== Life ==
She was born in La Grange, Illinois on 14 July 1942. She attended Bradley University and graduated with a Bachelors in Fine Art in 1964.

She has shown her work in numerous shows and exhibitions, including the 2011 Digital Darkroom group show at the Annenberg Space for Photography that was the focus of a 2015 KCET documentary.

She has written a number of instructional books.

== Works ==
- Bonny Pierce Lhotka (20 December 2010). Digital Alchemy: Printmaking techniques for fine art, photography, and mixed media. Pearson Education. ISBN 978-0-13-256294-2.
- Bonny Pierce Lhotka (9 April 2013). The Last Layer: New methods in digital printing for photography, fine art, and mixed media. New Riders. ISBN 978-0-13-337300-4.
- Bonny Pierce Lhotka (24 January 2015). Hacking the Digital Print: Alternative image capture and printmaking processes with a special section on 3D printing. New Riders. p. 2. ISBN 978-0-13-403653-3.
- Karin Schminke, Dorothy Simpson Krause, Bonny Pierce Lhotka, Digital Art Studio: Techniques for Combining Inkjet Printing with Traditional Art Materials Watson-Guptill Publications, 2004, ISBN 9780823013425
