= Lanžov =

- Municipality
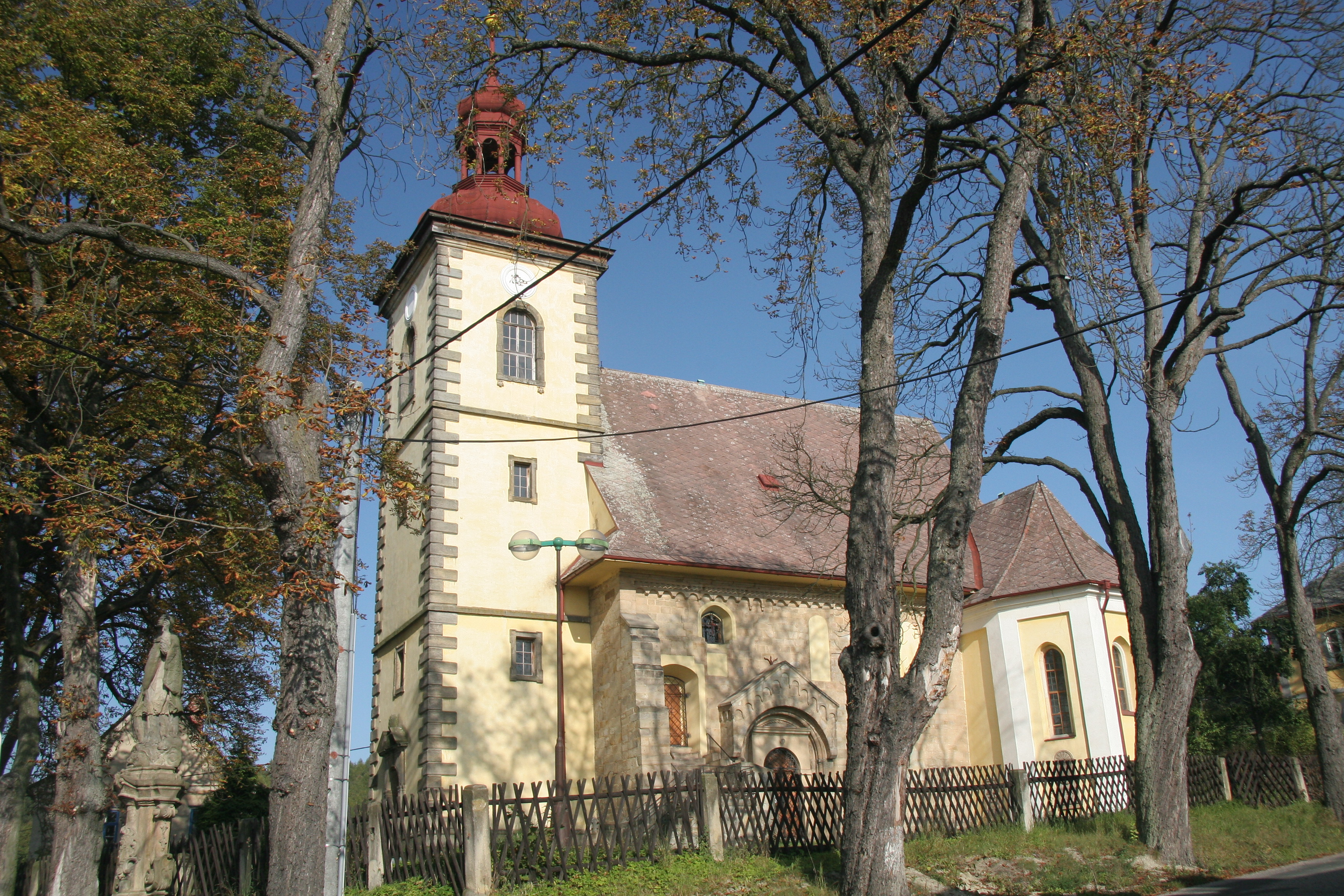
- Church of Saint Bartholomew

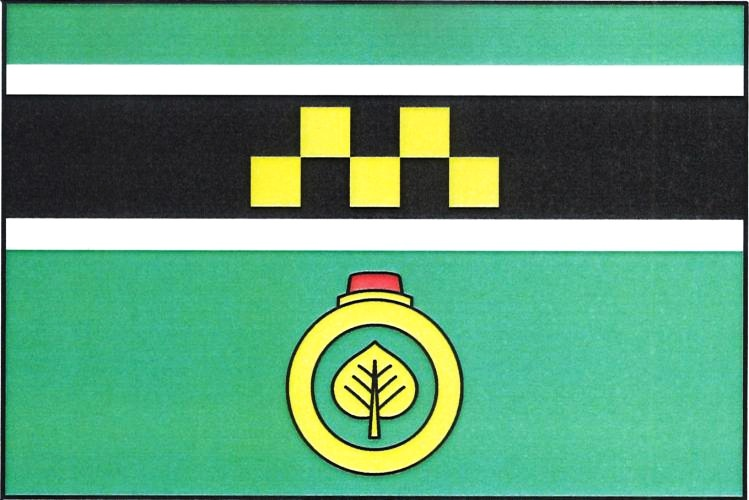
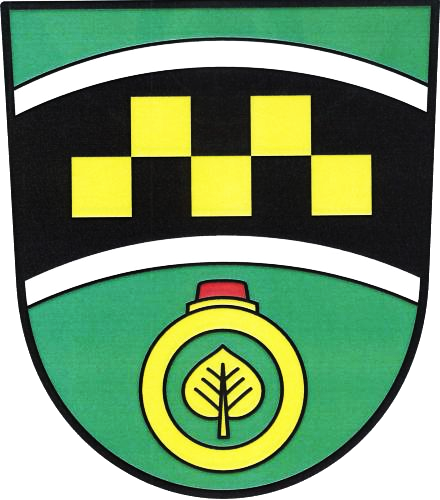
- Flag Coat of arms

- Location in the Czech Republic
- Coordinates: 50°23′13″N 15°45′39″E
- Country: Czech Republic
- Region: Hradec Králové
- District: Trutnov
- First mentioned: 1542

Area
  - Total: 7.92 km^{2} (3.06 sq mi)
- Elevation: 297 m (974 ft)

Population (2026-01-01)
  - Total: 213
  - Density: 26.9/km^{2} (69.7/sq mi)
- Time zone: UTC+1 (CET)
  - Summer (DST): UTC+2 (CEST)
- Postal code: 544 01
- Website: www.lanzov.cz

Lanžov is a municipality and village in Trutnov District in the Hradec Králové Region of the Czech Republic. It has about 200 inhabitants.

== Administrative division ==
Lanžov consists of five municipal parts (in brackets population according to the 2021 census):

- Lanžov (82)
- Lhotka (46)
- Miřejov (37)
- Sedlec (30)
- Záborov (8)

== Demographics ==
Historical population
Year	Pop.	±%
1869	1,037	—
1880	930	−10.3%
1890	897	−3.5%
1900	836	−6.8%
1910	824	−1.4%
1921	714	−13.3%
1930	629	−11.9%
1950	424	−32.6%
1961	412	−2.8%
1970	325	−21.1%
1980	248	−23.7%
1991	191	−23.0%
2001	186	−2.6%
2011	188	+1.1%
2021	203	+8.0%
Source: Censuses
