= Lhotka u Radnic =

- Municipality
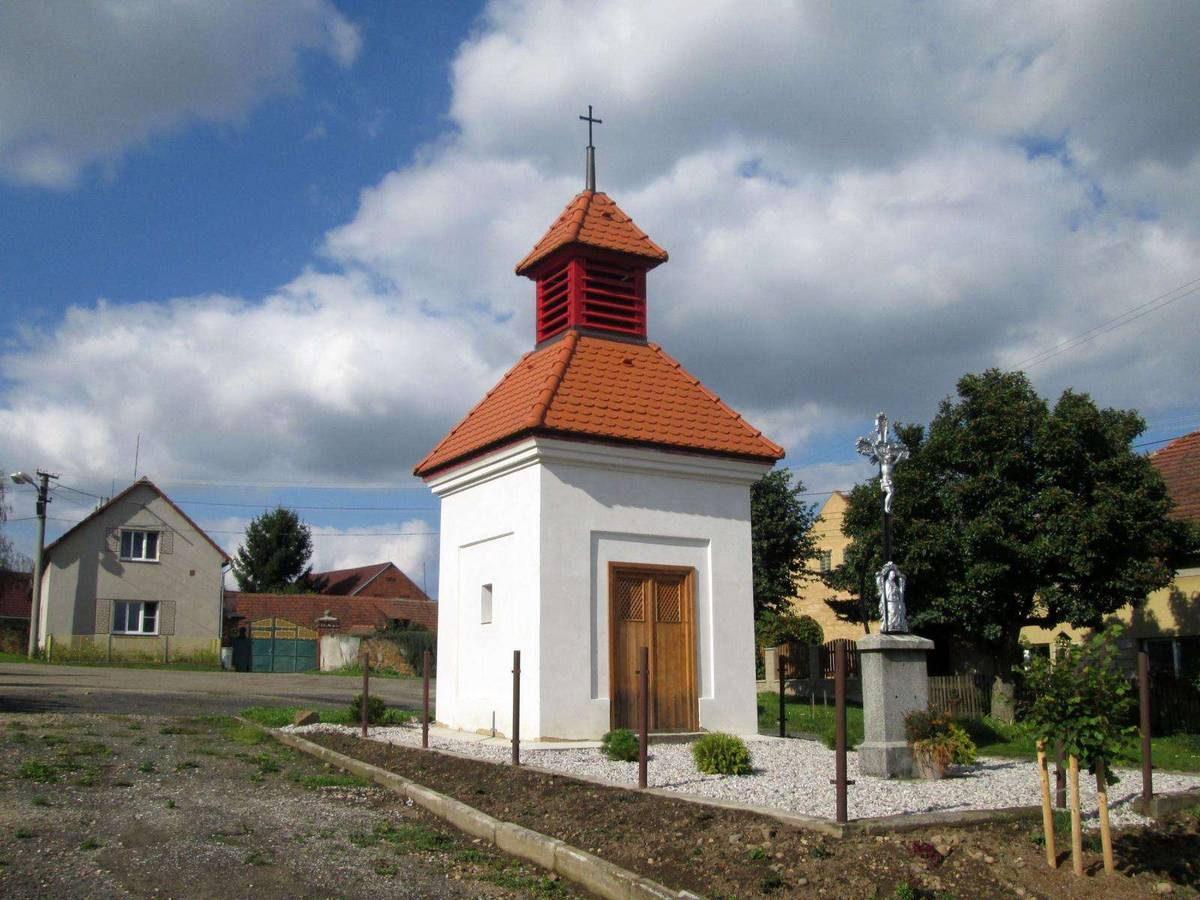
- Centre of Lhotka u Radnic with a chapel

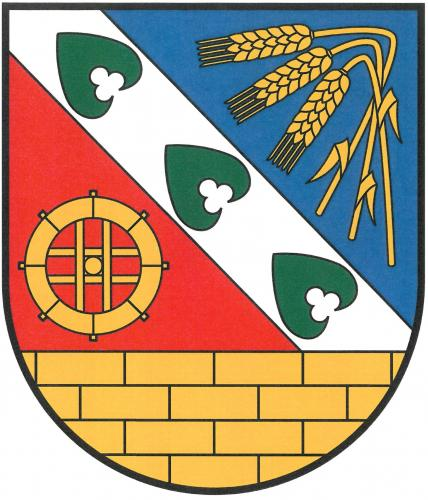
- Coat of arms

- Location in the Czech Republic
- Coordinates: 49°53′24″N 13°34′54″E
- Country: Czech Republic
- Region: Plzeň
- District: Rokycany
- First mentioned: 1362

Area
  - Total: 3.80 km^{2} (1.47 sq mi)
- Elevation: 397 m (1,302 ft)

Population (2026-01-01)
  - Total: 84
  - Density: 22/km^{2} (57/sq mi)
- Time zone: UTC+1 (CET)
  - Summer (DST): UTC+2 (CEST)
- Postal code: 338 24
- Website: www.lhotkauradnic.cz

Lhotka u Radnic is a municipality and village in Rokycany District in the Plzeň Region of the Czech Republic. It has about 80 inhabitants.

Lhotka u Radnic lies approximately 16 kilometres (10 mi) north of Rokycany, 22 km (14 mi) north-east of Plzeň, and 65 km (40 mi) west of Prague.

== Administrative division ==
Lhotka u Radnic consists of two municipal parts (in brackets population according to the 2021 census):

- Lhotka u Radnic (53)
- Chockov (7)

== Demographics ==
Historical population
Year	Pop.	±%
1869	255	—
1880	264	+3.5%
1890	257	−2.7%
1900	238	−7.4%
1910	245	+2.9%
1921	227	−7.3%
1930	202	−11.0%
1950	137	−32.2%
1961	137	+0.0%
1970	116	−15.3%
1980	108	−6.9%
1991	89	−17.6%
2001	75	−15.7%
2011	67	−10.7%
2021	60	−10.4%
Source: Censuses
