= Gerd-Paul von Below =

Gerd-Paul Valerian Georg Heinrich von Below
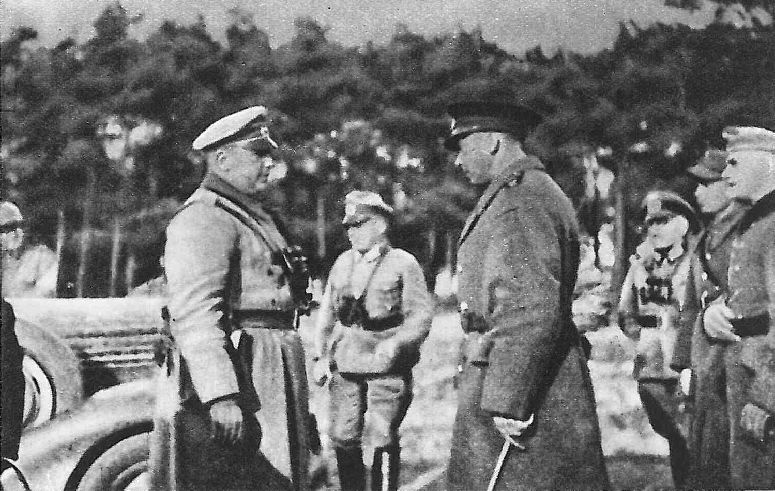
- Gerd-Paul von Below (on the left) in 1939
- Born: 30 November 1892; Strasburg, Province of Brandenburg, Prussia, German Empire
- Died: 8 December 1953 (aged 61); Voikovo prison camp, Soviet Union
- Military career
- Allegiance: German Empire (to 1918); Weimar Republic (to 1920); Nazi Germany
- Branch: Army
- Service years: 1911–1920; 1935–1945
- Rank: Generalmajor
- Conflicts: World War II
- Awards: Knight's Cross of the Iron Cross

Gerd-Paul Valerian Georg Heinrich von Below (30 November 1892 – 8 December 1953) was a general in the Wehrmacht of Nazi Germany during World War II. He was a recipient of the Knight's Cross of the Iron Cross. Below surrendered to the Soviet troops in May 1945 and died in captivity in 1953.

== Awards and decorations ==
- Knight's Cross of the Iron Cross on 28 February 1943 as Oberst of the Reserves and commander of the augmented Grenadier-Regiment 374

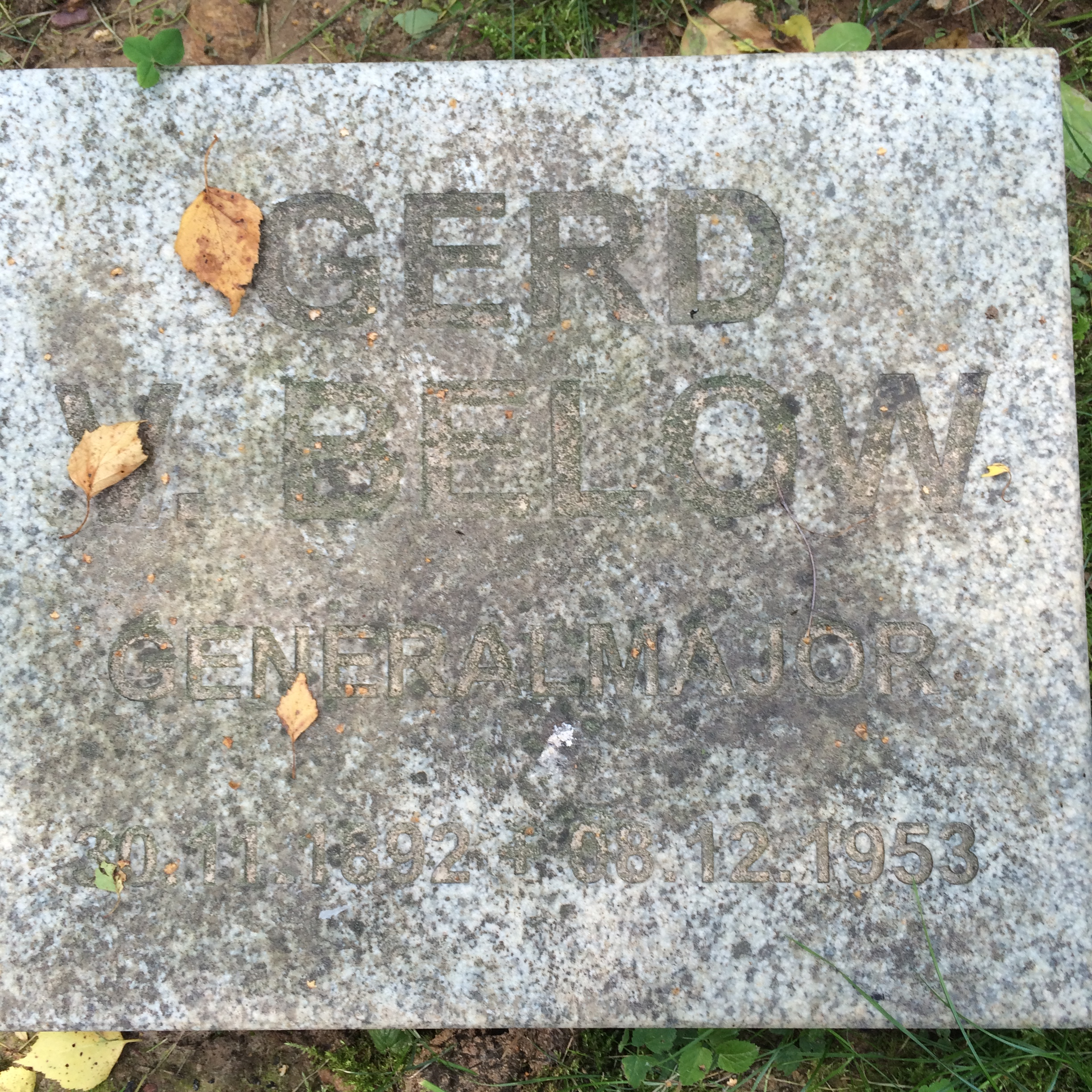
