= Blanice (Sázava) =

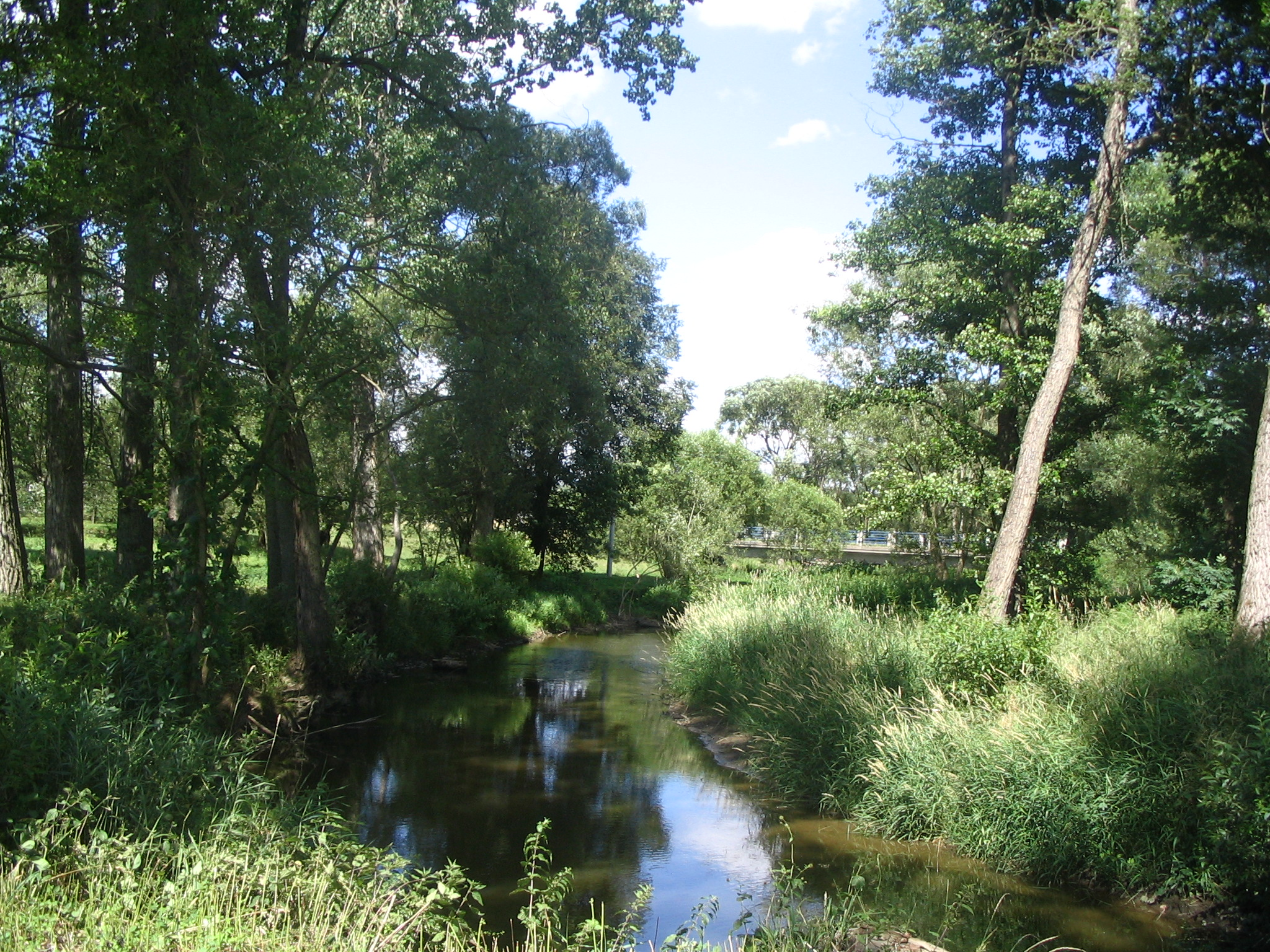
- The Blanice near Louňovice pod Blaníkem

Location
- Country: Czech Republic
- Regions: South Bohemian; Central Bohemian

Physical characteristics
- Source
  - location: Rodná, Křemešník Highlands
  - coordinates: 49°28′6″N 14°50′22″E
  - elevation: 683 m (2,241 ft)
- Mouth
  - location: Sázava
  - coordinates: 49°47′50″N 14°56′43″E
  - elevation: 303 m (994 ft)
- Length: 66.0 km (41.0 mi)
- Basin size: 543.3 km^{2} (209.8 sq mi)
- Discharge
  - average: 2.19 m^{3}/s (77 cu ft/s) near estuary

Basin features
- Progression: Sázava→ Vltava→ Elbe→ North Sea

The Blanice (Czech pronunciation: [ˈblaɲɪtsɛ]; German: Blanitz) is a river in the Czech Republic, a left tributary of the Sázava River. It flows through the South Bohemian and Central Bohemian regions. It is 66.0 km (41.0 mi) long.

== Etymology ==
The name is derived from the old Czech word blan, which meant 'meadow'. The name referred to the character of the territory through which it flows. The river is sometimes called Vlašimská Blanice to distinguish it from the eponymous tributary of the Otava.

== Characteristic ==
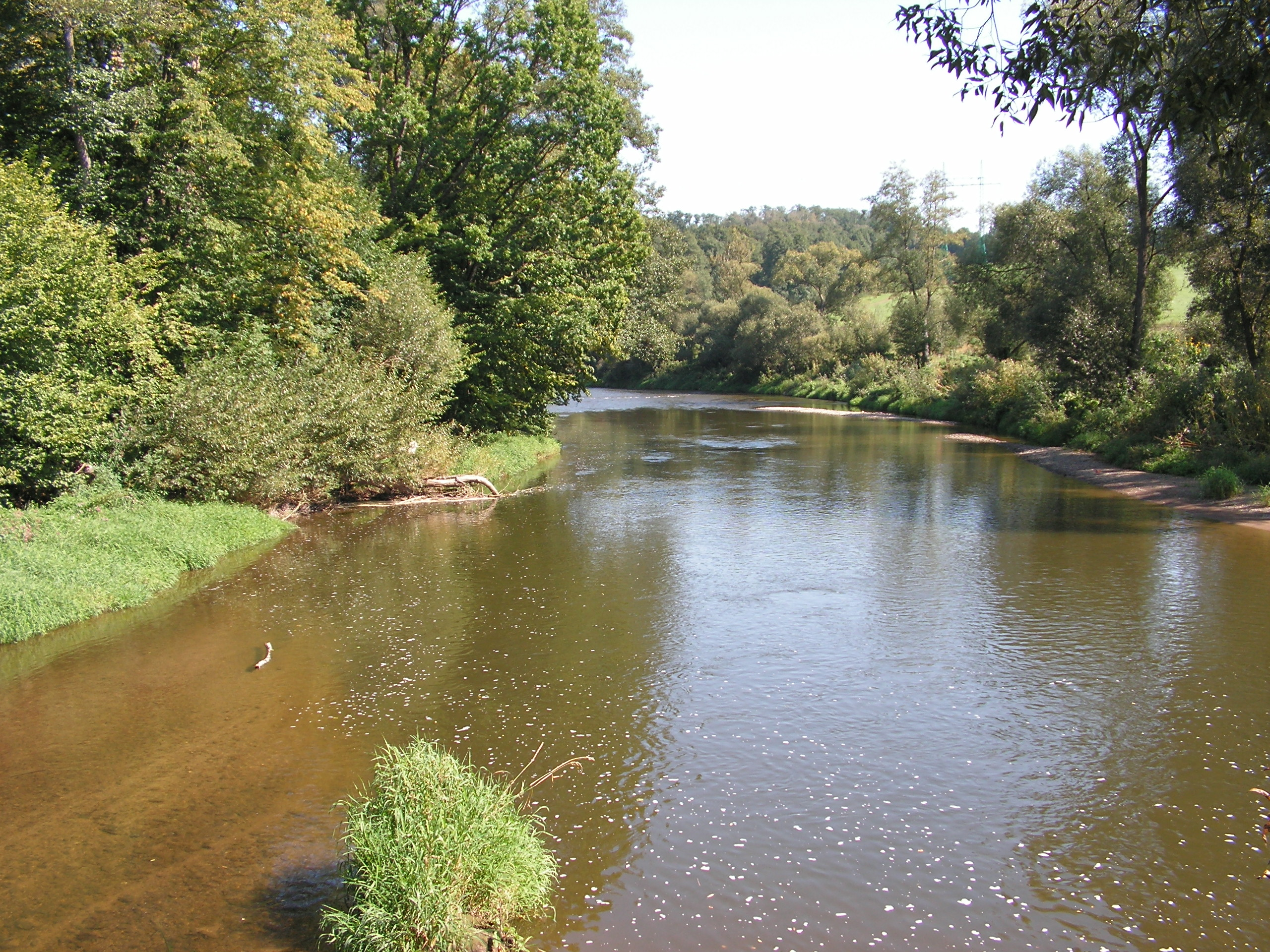
Confluence of the Blanice (left) and Sázava

The Blanice originates in the territory of Rodná in the Křemešník Highlands at an elevation of 683 m (2,241 ft) and flows to Soběšín, where it enters the Sázava River at an elevation of 303 m (994 ft). It is 66.0 km (41.0 mi) long. Its drainage basin has an area of 543.3 km^{2} (209.8 sq mi).

The longest tributaries of the Blanice are:

| Tributary | Length (km) | River km | Side |
|---|---|---|---|
| Chotýšanka | 37.1 | 7.9 | left |
| Slupský potok | 15.5 | 47.6 | left |
| Novoveský potok | 12.4 | 53.3 | left |
| Brodec | 10.1 | 30.6 | right |

== Course ==
The most notable settlement on the river is the town of Vlašim. The river flows through the municipal territories of Rodná, Pohnání, Dolní Hrachovice, Mladá Vožice, Běleč, Šebířov, Kamberk, Zvěstov, Louňovice pod Blaníkem, Ostrov, Kondrac, Hradiště, Vlašim, Ctiboř, Tehov, Libež, Všechlapy, Divišov, Český Šternberk and Soběšín.

== Bodies of water ==
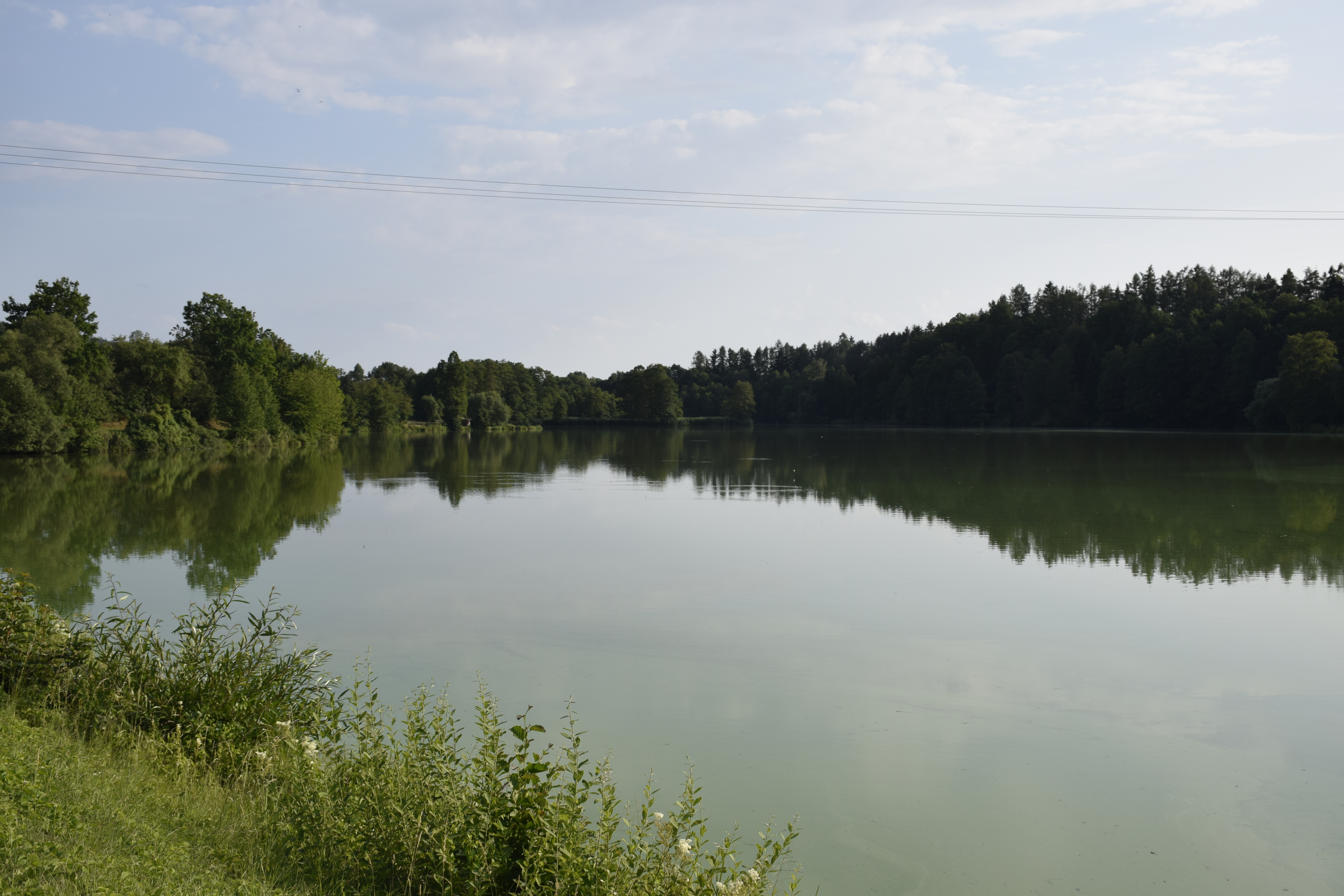
Kamberský (Zlatohorský) pond on the Blanice

There are 934 bodies of water in the basin area. The largest of them is the fishpond Smikov with an area of 23.2 ha (57 acres), built on the Chotýšanka. There are four fishponds built directly on the Blanice.

== Nature ==
The most common fish in the river are common chub, common roach and gudgeon. Rare is the occurrence of European eel.

The riverbed in the section between Mladá Vožice and Kamberk is protected as Vlašimská Blanice Nature Monument with an area of 30.4 ha (75 acres). The Blanice then flows through the Blaník Protected Landscape Area. The wider area, which includes both sections in protected areas, is also protected as Vlašimská Blanice Special Area of Conservation. The reason for protection is the occurrence of rare and endangered species, especially thick shelled river mussel, brook lamprey, hermit beetle and Eurasian otter.

== Tourism ==
The Blanice is suitable for river tourism during spring, when the river level is higher. About 42 km (26 mi) of the river is navigable.

== See also ==
- List of rivers of the Czech Republic
