= Nemíž =

- Village
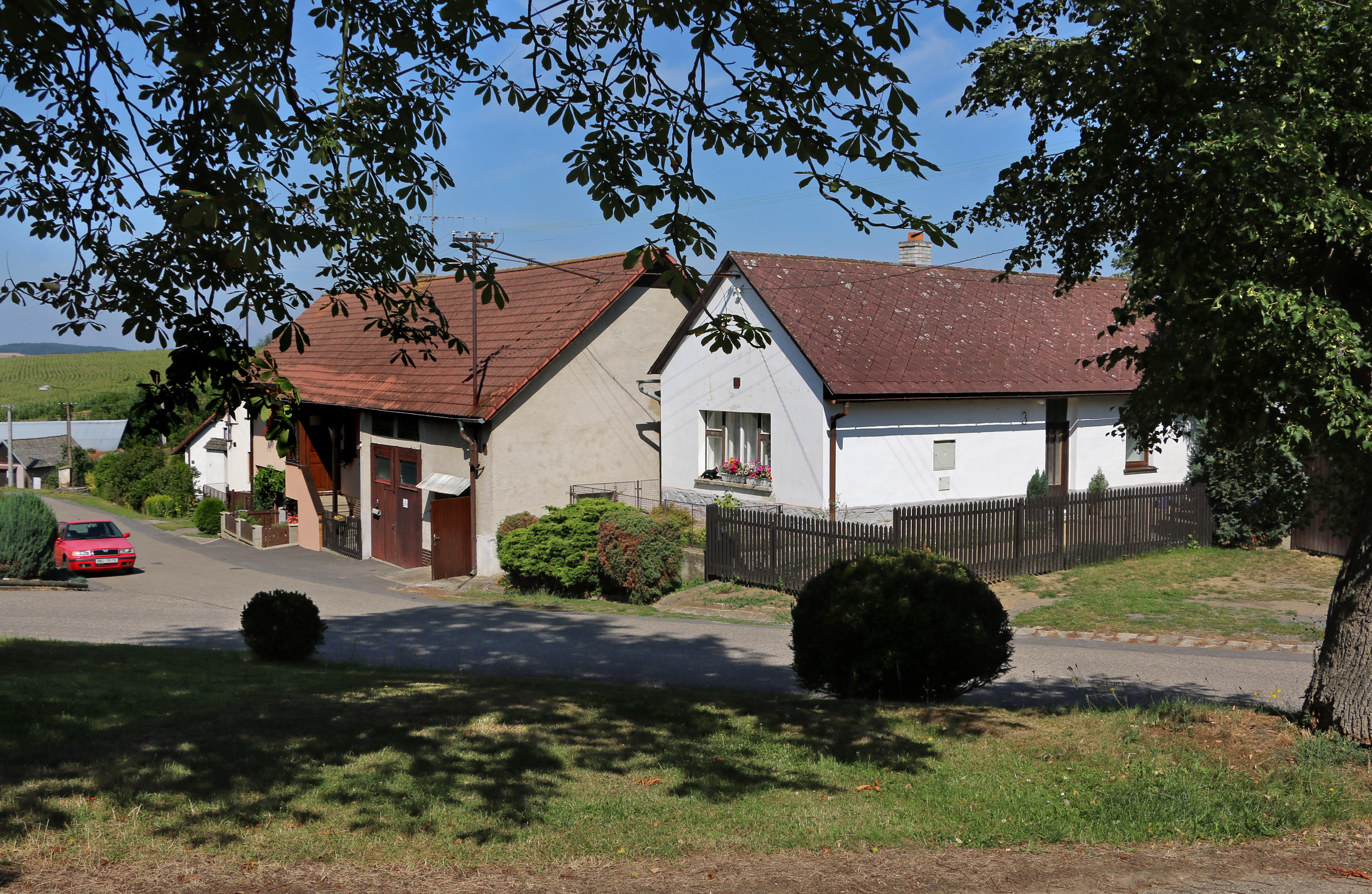
- Centre of Nemíž

- Location in the Czech Republic
- Coordinates: 49°44′34″N 14°56′2″E
- Country: Czech Republic
- Region: Central Bohemian
- District: Benešov
- Municipality: Tehov
- First mentioned: 1471

Area
  - Total: 3.94 km^{2} (1.52 sq mi)
- Elevation: 355 m (1,165 ft)

Population (2021)
  - Total: 51
  - Density: 13/km^{2} (34/sq mi)
- Time zone: UTC+1 (CET)
  - Summer (DST): UTC+2 (CEST)
- Postal code: 258 01

Nemíž is a village and municipal part of Tehov in Benešov District in the Central Bohemian Region of the Czech Republic. It has about 50 inhabitants.

== History ==
Until 1900, Nemíž was part of the Ctiboř municipality. From 1900 to 1985, it was an independent municipality. From 1986 to 1990, Nemíž belonged to Vlašim. After another period between 1990 and 2008, when it was an independent municipality, it was finally annexed to Tehov in 2009.

== Demographics ==
Historical population
Year	Pop.	±%
1869	183	—
1880	175	−4.4%
1890	177	+1.1%
1900	164	−7.3%
1910	171	+4.3%
1921	152	−11.1%
1930	126	−17.1%
1950	102	−19.0%
1961	96	−5.9%
1970	79	−17.7%
1980	73	−7.6%
1991	47	−35.6%
2001	37	−21.3%
2011	52	+40.5%
2021	51	−1.9%
Source: Censuses
