= Tehov =

Tehov may refer to places in the Czech Republic:

- Tehov (Benešov District), a municipality and village in the Central Bohemian Region
- Tehov (Prague-East District), a municipality and village in the Central Bohemian Region
