= Franz Hauser =

German opera singer

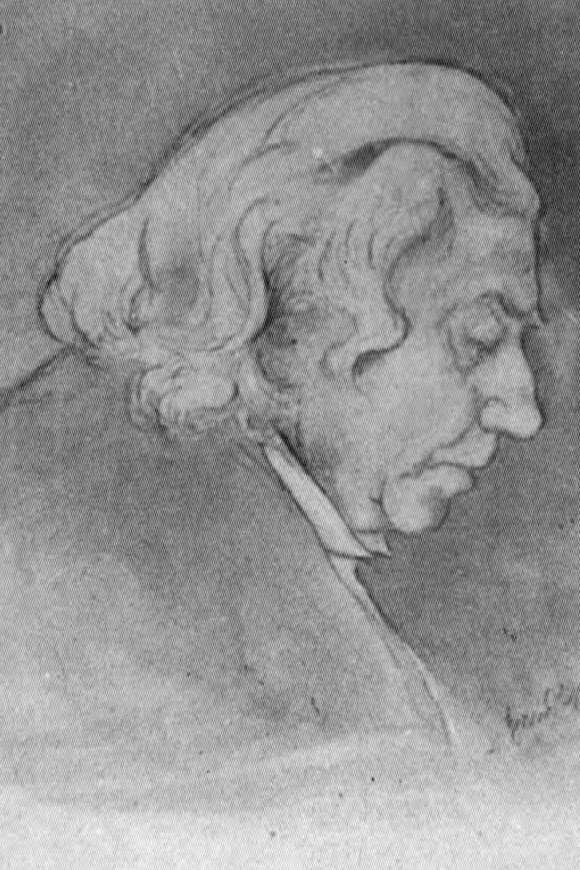
Franz Hauser, oil painting by Hans Thoma

Franz Xaver Hauser (12 January 1794 – 14 August 1870) was a singer, voice teacher and music manuscript collector.

== Life ==
Franz Hauser was born in Krasovice (today part of Kondrac in the Czech Republic). At his father's insistence, he first studied medicine, but he then studied singing with Václav Tomášek and composition with oboist Josef Triebensee.

He made his stage debut in 1817 in Prague as Sarastro in Mozart's Magic Flute. He found great success at the opera theatres in Vienna, Leipzig, and Berlin. He retired from the stage in 1838 and taught singing in Vienna. In 1846 he was appointed as director of the newly established conservatory in Munich (now the Hochschule für Musik und Theater München), serving as its director until 1864. He retired in 1865 to Karlsruhe and two years later to Freiburg im Breisgau. He died on 14 August 1870 in Freiburg im Breisgau.

== Work ==
Contemporary critics considered Hauser cold as an actor but approved of his pure voice. He was known for his interpretation of Weber and as Figaro (both Rossini's and Mozart's), Bertram, William Tell, and Spohr's Faust.

Hauser had many students including Jenny Lind and Henriette Sontag. He wrote a popular singing manual, Gesanglehre für Lehrer und Lernende (Leipzig, 1866) (freely available through Google books). As a composer, he was known for his songs. His correspondence with composer Moritz Hauptmann was published in two volumes in 1871.

Hauser's greatest significance today is as a collector of musical manuscripts – most notably of the composer Johann Sebastian Bach- assembling the greatest 19th century collection of that composer's manuscripts. He was a consultant for the Bach-Gesellschaft edition and prepared a thematic catalogue of Bach's works. Most of Hauser's autograph manuscripts by Bach (including 19 cantatas, the accompanied sonatas for violin, and the English suites for keyboard) were acquired by the Berlin Royal Library in 1904. Others were destroyed in 1945. Parts of his collection are also in the Darmstadt Landesbibliothek and the Harvard University Loeb Music Library.

== Family ==
His son, Moritz Hauser (1827–1857), became a theatre director in Königsberg and a minor composer.
