= Šebířov =

- Municipality
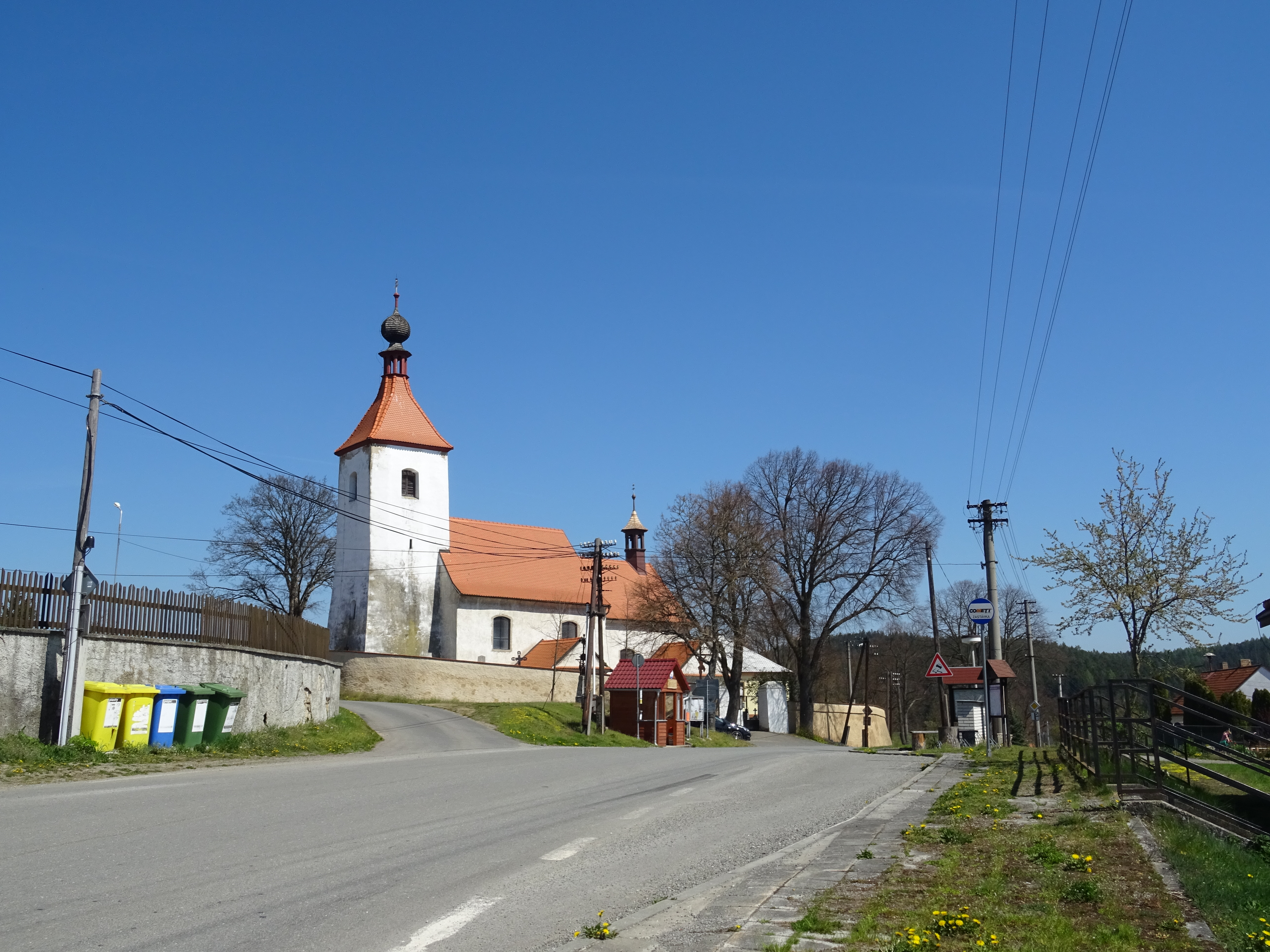
- Church of Saint Gall

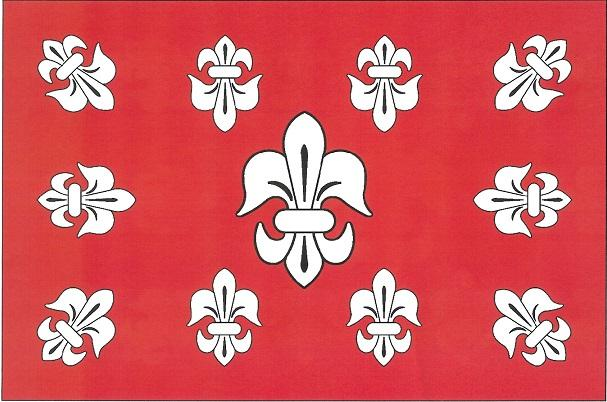
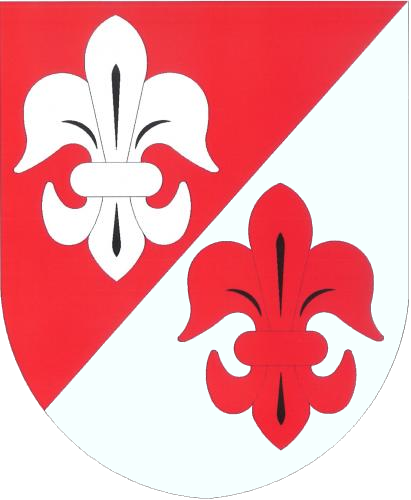
- Flag Coat of arms

- Location in the Czech Republic
- Coordinates: 49°33′59″N 14°49′35″E
- Country: Czech Republic
- Region: South Bohemian
- District: Tábor
- First mentioned: 1318

Area
  - Total: 23.21 km^{2} (8.96 sq mi)
- Elevation: 410 m (1,350 ft)

Population (2026-01-01)
  - Total: 368
  - Density: 15.9/km^{2} (41.1/sq mi)
- Time zone: UTC+1 (CET)
  - Summer (DST): UTC+2 (CEST)
- Postal code: 391 43
- Website: www.sebirov.cz

Šebířov is a municipality and village in Tábor District in the South Bohemian Region of the Czech Republic. It has about 400 inhabitants.

== Administrative division ==
Šebířov consists of 11 municipal parts (in brackets population according to the 2021 census):

- Šebířov (139)
- Křekovice (4)
- Křekovická Lhota (9)
- Kříženec (10)
- Lhýšov (10)
- Popovice (15)
- Skrýšov (12)
- Vosná (15)
- Vrcholtovice (29)
- Vyšetice (49)
- Záříčí u Mladé Vožice (35)

== Etymology ==
The name is derived from the personal name Šebíř, meaning "Šebíř's (court, property)".

== Geography ==
Šebířov is located about 20 kilometres (12 mi) northeast of Tábor and 57 km (35 mi) southeast of Prague. It lies in the Vlašim Uplands. The highest point is the hill Vinná hora at 543 m (1,781 ft) above sea level. The Blanice River flows through the municipality.

== History ==
The first written mention of Šebířov is from 1318. From 1678 until the establishment of an independent municipality, the village was owned by the Counts of Küenburg.

== Demographics ==
Historical population

Year	Pop.	±%
1869	1,441	—
1880	1,494	+3.7%
1890	1,446	−3.2%
1900	1,372	−5.1%
1910	1,327	−3.3%

Year	Pop.	±%
1921	1,384	+4.3%
1930	1,208	−12.7%
1950	818	−32.3%
1961	757	−7.5%
1970	623	−17.7%

Year	Pop.	±%
1980	536	−14.0%
1991	461	−14.0%
2001	408	−11.5%
2011	359	−12.0%
2021	327	−8.9%

Source: Censuses

== Transport ==
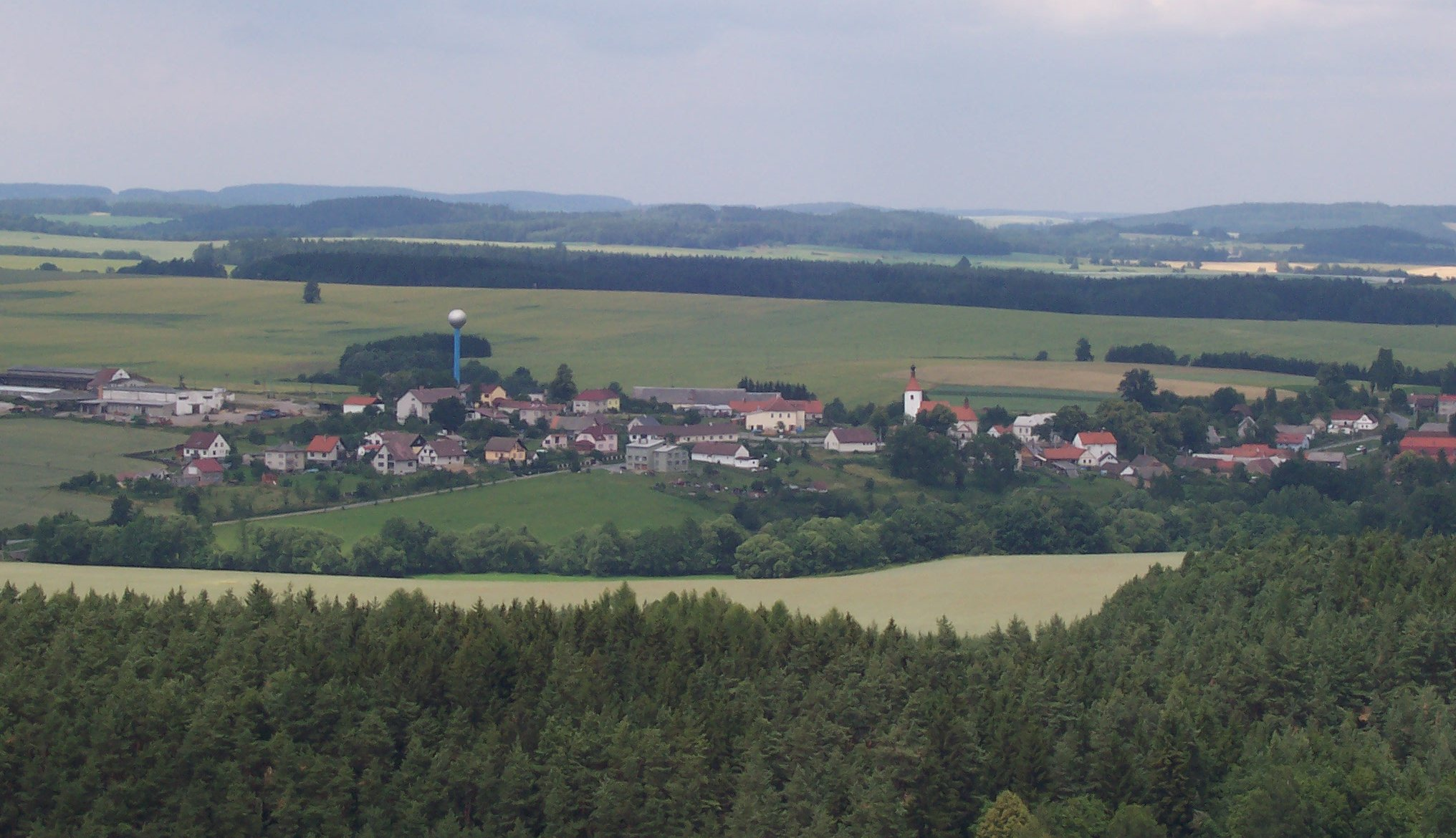
General view of Šebířov

There are no railways or major roads passing through the municipality.

== Sights ==
The main landmark of Šebířov is the Church of Saint Gall. It is originally a Gothic church from the 14th century, rebuilt in the Baroque style in 1886.
