= Kamberk =

- Municipality
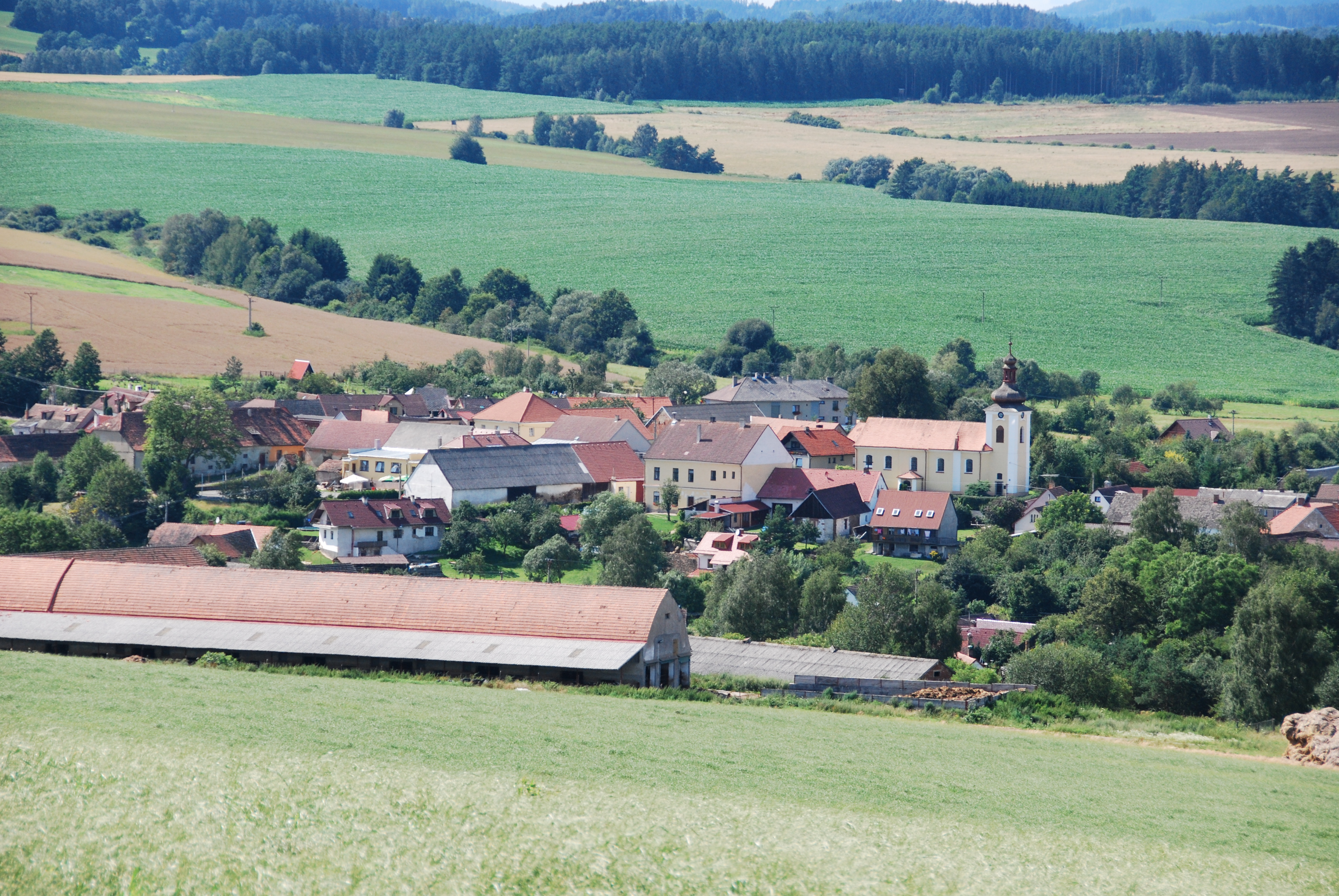
- General view

- Location in the Czech Republic
- Coordinates: 49°35′50″N 14°50′25″E
- Country: Czech Republic
- Region: Central Bohemian
- District: Benešov
- First mentioned: 1282

Area
  - Total: 11.35 km^{2} (4.38 sq mi)
- Elevation: 398 m (1,306 ft)

Population (2026-01-01)
  - Total: 174
  - Density: 15.3/km^{2} (39.7/sq mi)
- Time zone: UTC+1 (CET)
  - Summer (DST): UTC+2 (CEST)
- Postal code: 257 06
- Website: www.kamberk.cz

Kamberk is a municipality and village in Benešov District in the Central Bohemian Region of the Czech Republic. It has about 200 inhabitants.

== Administrative division ==
Kamberk consists of three municipal parts (in brackets population according to the 2021 census):

- Kamberk (122)
- Hrajovice (20)
- Předbořice (17)

== Etymology ==
The initial name of the settlement was Karrenberk. The name was derived from the word karre (from Latin carrus), which denoted a four-wheeled minecart. The abbreviated form Kamberk appeared from the turn of the 14th and 15th centuries.

== Geography ==
Kamberk is located about 23 kilometres (14 mi) southeast of Benešov and 55 km (34 mi) southeast of Prague. It lies in the Vlašim Uplands. The highest point is at 520 m (1,710 ft) above sea level.

The Blanice River flows through the municipality. The fishpond Kamberský rybník is built on the river. It has an area of 13 ha (32 acres).

== History ==
The settlement was probably founded in the second half of the 13th century by miners from the nearby gold mines. The first written mention of Kamberk is from 1282, when the village was owned by the Landštejn family. In 1337–1347, the gold mines with Kamberk belonged to Peter I of Rosenberg. The owners of Kamberk then often changed and included various lesser nobles. In 1512, during the rule of Albrecht Rendl of Úšava, Kamberk was promoted to a market town, but it later lost the title. In 1628–1700, Kamberk was owned by the Schwenda family. In 1700, Kamberk was acquired by the Küenburg family, who annexed it to the Mladá Vožice estate.

== Demographics ==
Historical population

Year	Pop.	±%
1869	845	—
1880	883	+4.5%
1890	816	−7.6%
1900	809	−0.9%
1910	835	+3.2%

Year	Pop.	±%
1921	843	+1.0%
1930	767	−9.0%
1950	433	−43.5%
1961	394	−9.0%
1970	306	−22.3%

Year	Pop.	±%
1980	268	−12.4%
1991	195	−27.2%
2001	170	−12.8%
2011	156	−8.2%
2021	159	+1.9%

Source: Censuses

== Transport ==
There are no railways or major roads passing through the municipality.

== Sights ==
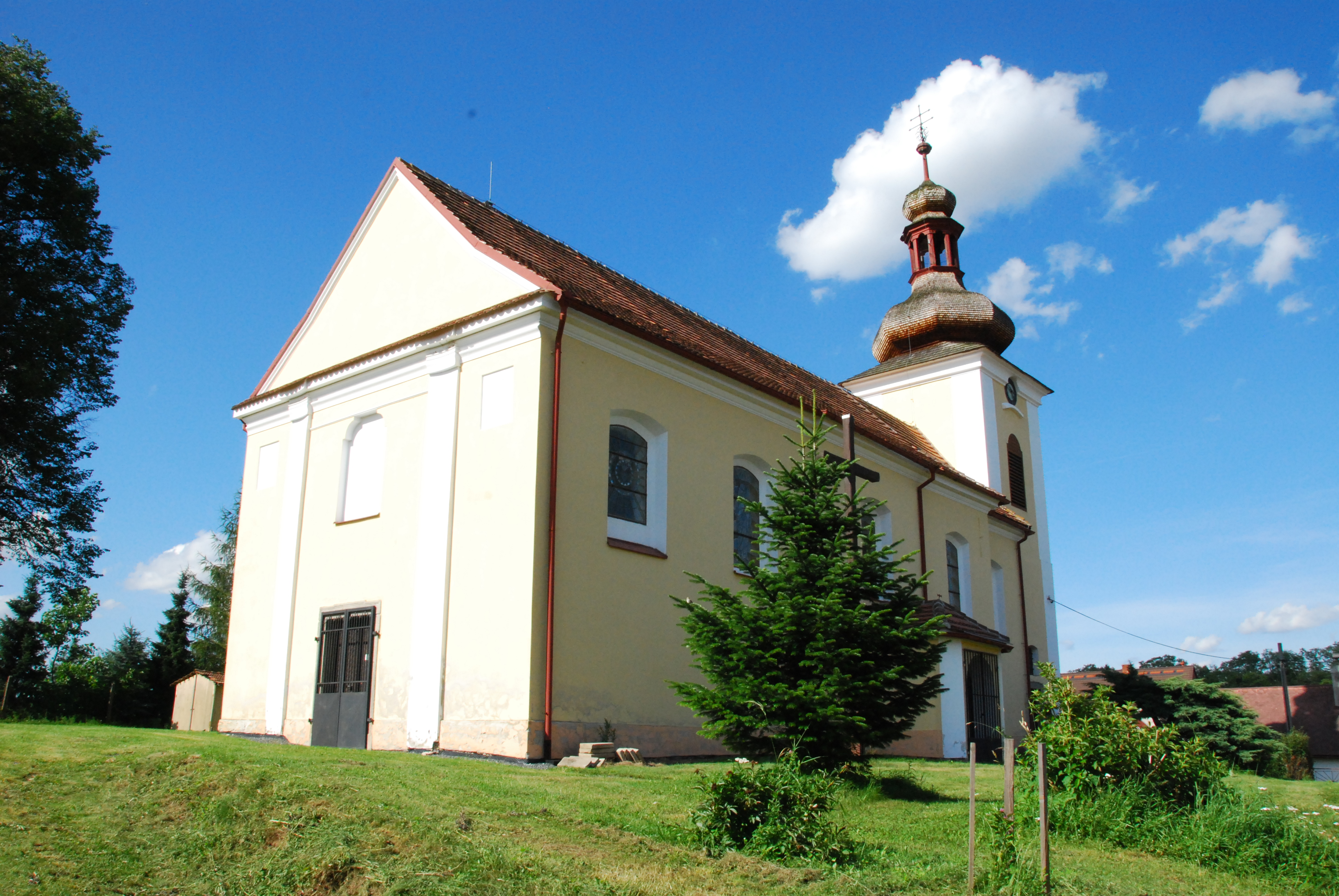
Church of Saint Martin

The main landmark of Kamberk is the Church of Saint Martin. The church was first documented in 1352, but it burned down in 1720. The current Baroque church was subsequently built on the site.

The oldest monument was the fortress from the 13th century. It was converted into a rectory in 1785, but in 1869, the building burned down. It was reconstructed in 1871 and part of the fortress was preserved in the new building, but it lost its historical value.
