= Všechlapy (Benešov District) =

- Municipality
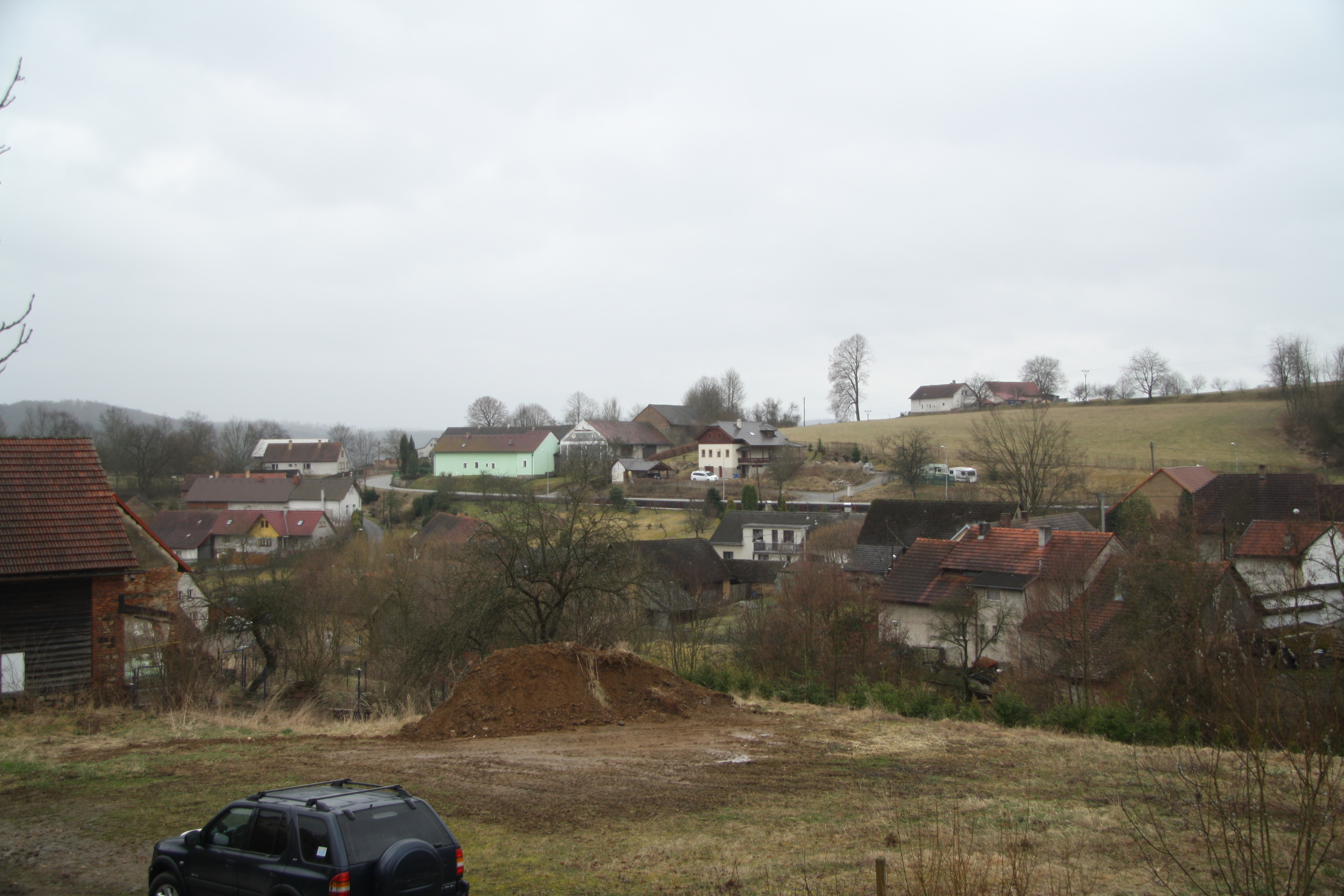
- General view

- Location in the Czech Republic
- Coordinates: 49°46′45″N 14°54′51″E
- Country: Czech Republic
- Region: Central Bohemian
- District: Benešov
- First mentioned: 1378

Area
  - Total: 5.56 km^{2} (2.15 sq mi)
- Elevation: 400 m (1,300 ft)

Population (2026-01-01)
  - Total: 122
  - Density: 21.9/km^{2} (56.8/sq mi)
- Time zone: UTC+1 (CET)
  - Summer (DST): UTC+2 (CEST)
- Postal code: 257 26
- Website: www.obecvsechlapy.cz

Všechlapy is a municipality and village in Benešov District in the Central Bohemian Region of the Czech Republic. It has about 100 inhabitants.

== Etymology ==
The name is derived from the Czech word vše ('all') and the old Czech word chlapi ('commoners', 'peasants').

== Geography ==
Všechlapy is located about 16 kilometres (10 mi) east of Benešov and 41 km (25 mi) southeast of Prague. It lies in the Vlašim Uplands. The highest point is the hill Skřivánek at 507 m (1,663 ft) above sea level. The Blanice River flows along the eastern municipal border.

== History ==
The first written mention of Všechlapy is from 1378, when Queen Elizabeth of Pomerania donated the village to the Augustinian women's convent of St. Catherine in New Town of Prague. The convent owned Všechlapy until the 17th century, when it was acquired by the Sternberg family.

In 1977–1991, Všechlapy was a municipal part of Divišov.

== Demographics ==
Historical population

Year	Pop.	±%
1869	327	—
1880	323	−1.2%
1890	365	+13.0%
1900	421	+15.3%
1910	363	−13.8%

Year	Pop.	±%
1921	353	−2.8%
1930	326	−7.6%
1950	246	−24.5%
1961	205	−16.7%
1970	173	−15.6%

Year	Pop.	±%
1980	118	−31.8%
1991	89	−24.6%
2001	76	−14.6%
2011	84	+10.5%
2021	110	+31.0%

Source: Censuses

== Transport ==
The D1 motorway from Prague to Brno runs through the northeastern part of the municipality.

== Sights ==
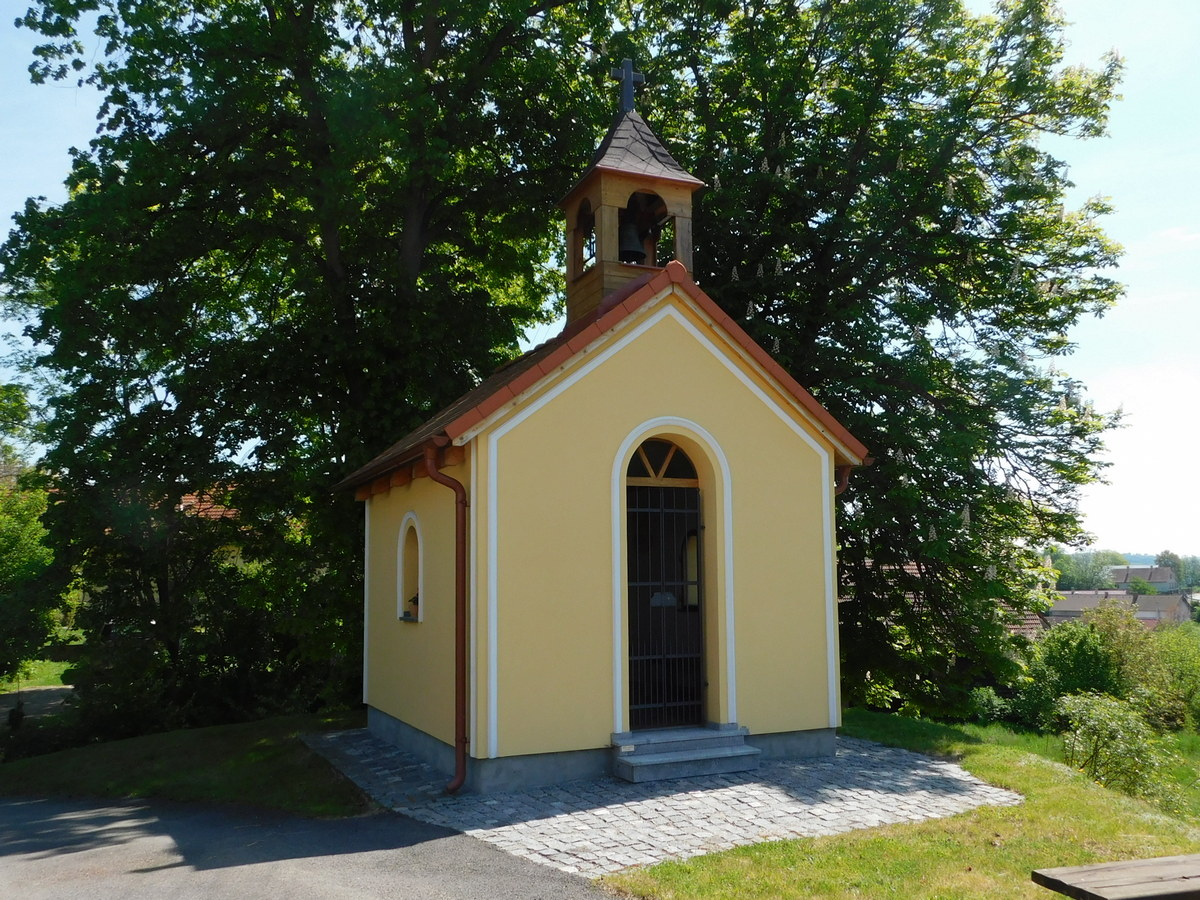
Chapel

There are no protected cultural monuments in the municipality. A landmark is the chapel in the centre of Všechlapy.
