= Rodná =

- Municipality
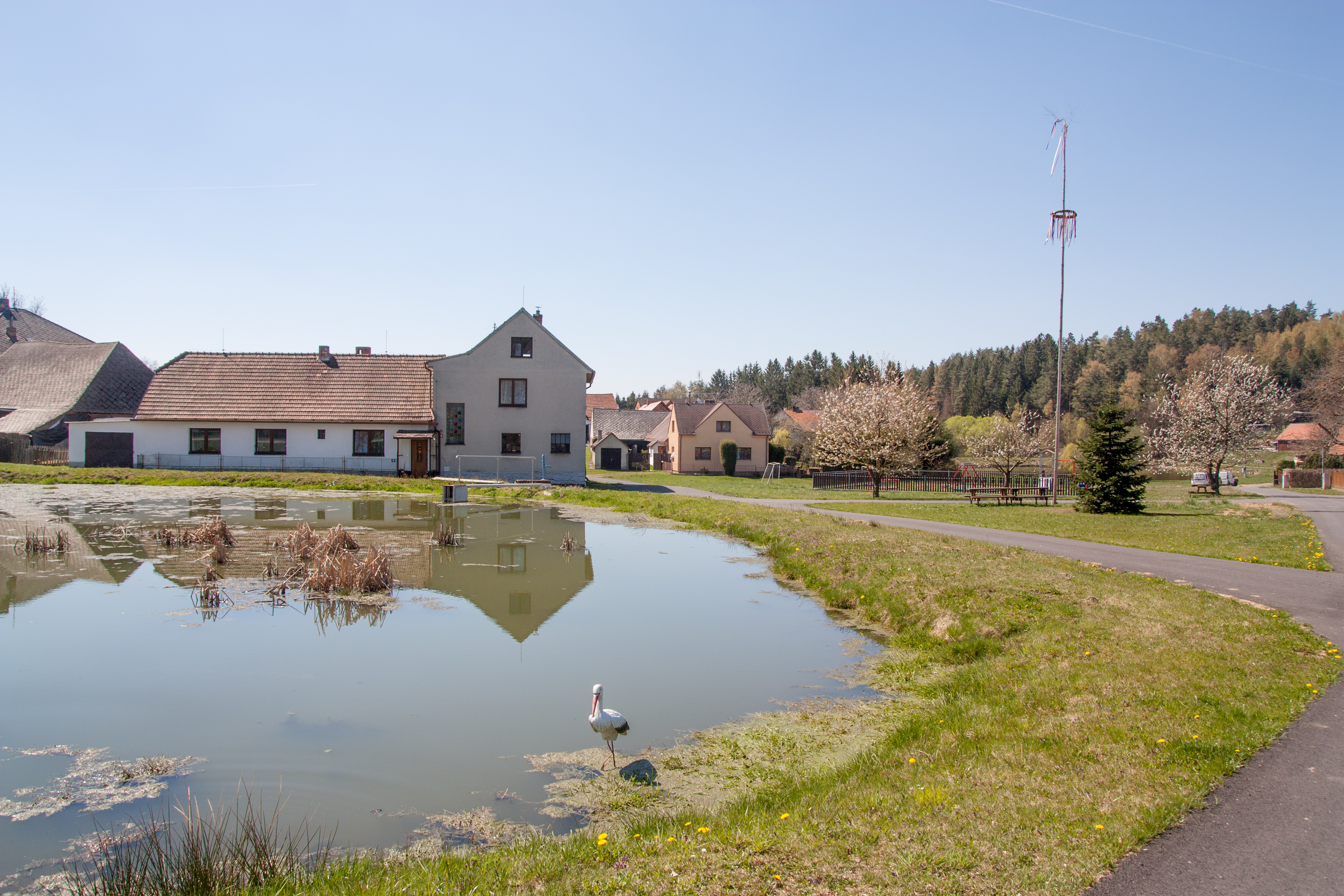
- Centre of Rodná

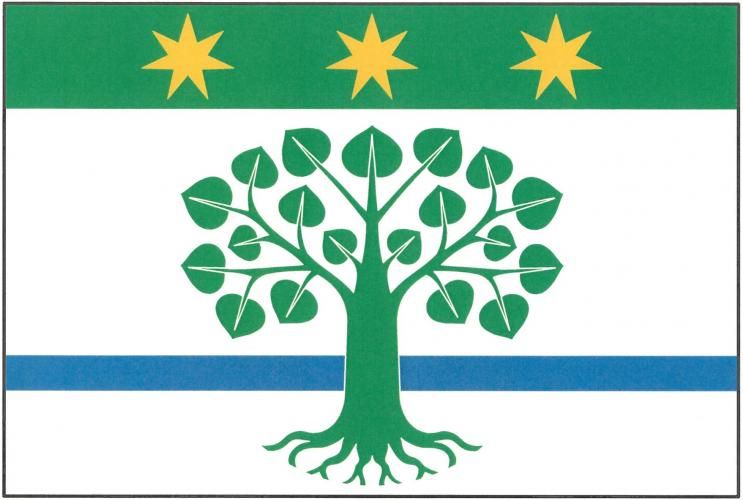
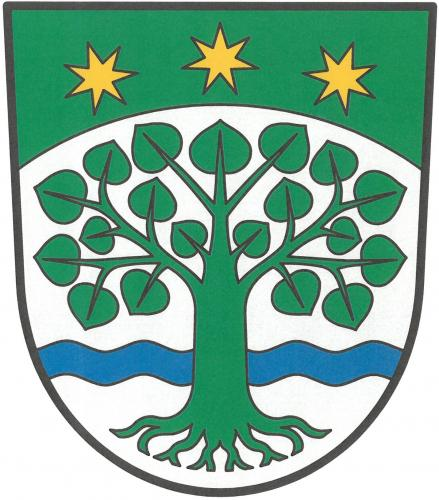
- Flag Coat of arms

- Location in the Czech Republic
- Coordinates: 49°29′25″N 14°50′33″E
- Country: Czech Republic
- Region: South Bohemian
- District: Tábor
- First mentioned: 1394

Area
  - Total: 9.14 km^{2} (3.53 sq mi)
- Elevation: 655 m (2,149 ft)

Population (2026-01-01)
  - Total: 97
  - Density: 11/km^{2} (27/sq mi)
- Time zone: UTC+1 (CET)
  - Summer (DST): UTC+2 (CEST)
- Postal code: 391 43
- Website: www.rodna.eu

Rodná is a municipality and village in Tábor District in the South Bohemian Region of the Czech Republic. It has about 100 inhabitants.

Rodná lies approximately 16 kilometres (10 mi) north-east of Tábor, 64 km (40 mi) north-east of České Budějovice, and 73 km (45 mi) south-east of Prague.

== Administrative division ==
Rodná consists of three municipal parts (in brackets population according to the 2021 census):

- Rodná (82)
- Blanička (8)
- Nahořany (3)

== Demographics ==
Historical population
Year	Pop.	±%
1869	436	—
1880	469	+7.6%
1890	412	−12.2%
1900	381	−7.5%
1910	381	+0.0%
1921	371	−2.6%
1930	347	−6.5%
1950	220	−36.6%
1961	188	−14.5%
1970	176	−6.4%
1980	155	−11.9%
1991	127	−18.1%
2001	115	−9.4%
2011	85	−26.1%
2021	93	+9.4%
Source: Censuses
