= Pohnání =

- Municipality
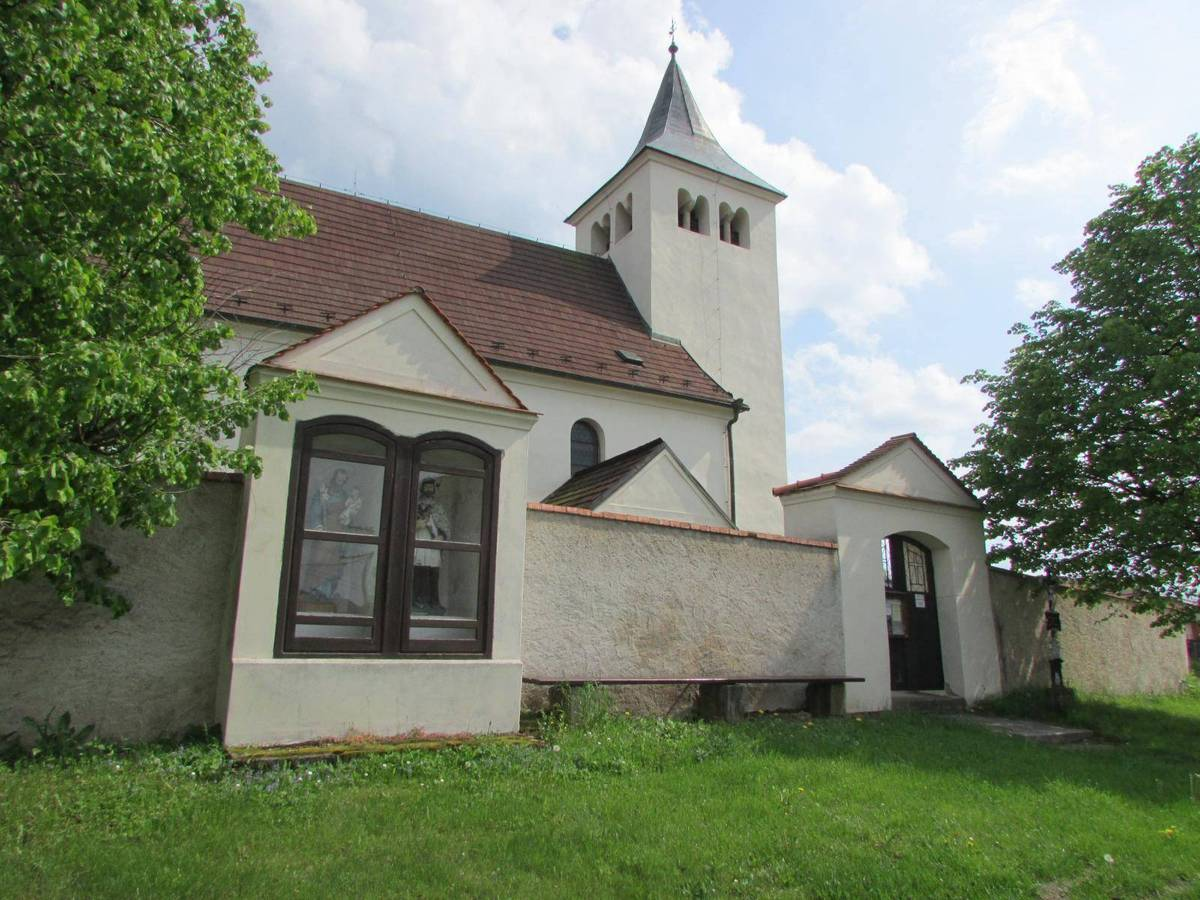
- Church of Saint Procopius

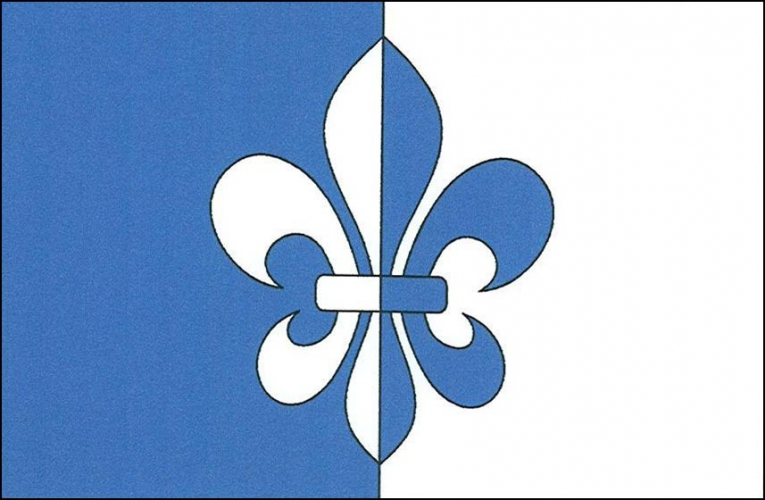
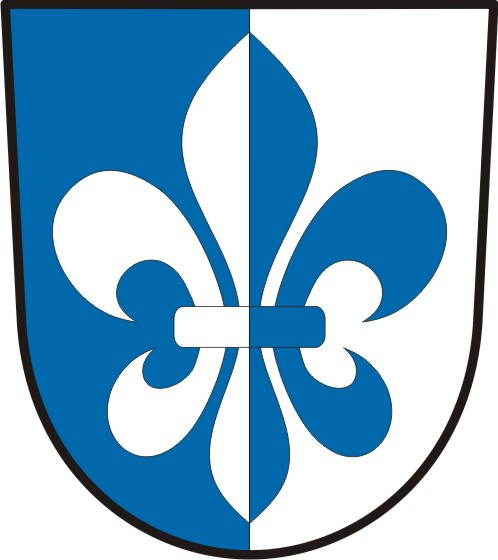
- Flag Coat of arms

- Location in the Czech Republic
- Coordinates: 49°28′39″N 14°48′40″E
- Country: Czech Republic
- Region: South Bohemian
- District: Tábor
- First mentioned: 1360

Area
  - Total: 3.57 km^{2} (1.38 sq mi)
- Elevation: 627 m (2,057 ft)

Population (2026-01-01)
  - Total: 82
  - Density: 23/km^{2} (59/sq mi)
- Time zone: UTC+1 (CET)
  - Summer (DST): UTC+2 (CEST)
- Postal code: 391 43
- Website: www.pohnani.cz

Pohnání is a municipality and village in Tábor District in the South Bohemian Region of the Czech Republic. It has about 80 inhabitants.

Pohnání lies approximately 14 kilometres (9 mi) north-east of Tábor, 61 km (38 mi) north-east of České Budějovice, and 74 km (46 mi) south-east of Prague.

== Demographics ==
Historical population
Year	Pop.	±%
1869	205	—
1880	230	+12.2%
1890	231	+0.4%
1900	217	−6.1%
1910	204	−6.0%
1921	195	−4.4%
1930	156	−20.0%
1950	122	−21.8%
1961	113	−7.4%
1970	93	−17.7%
1980	110	+18.3%
1991	93	−15.5%
2001	90	−3.2%
2011	72	−20.0%
2021	71	−1.4%
Source: Censuses
