= Dolní Hrachovice =

- Municipality
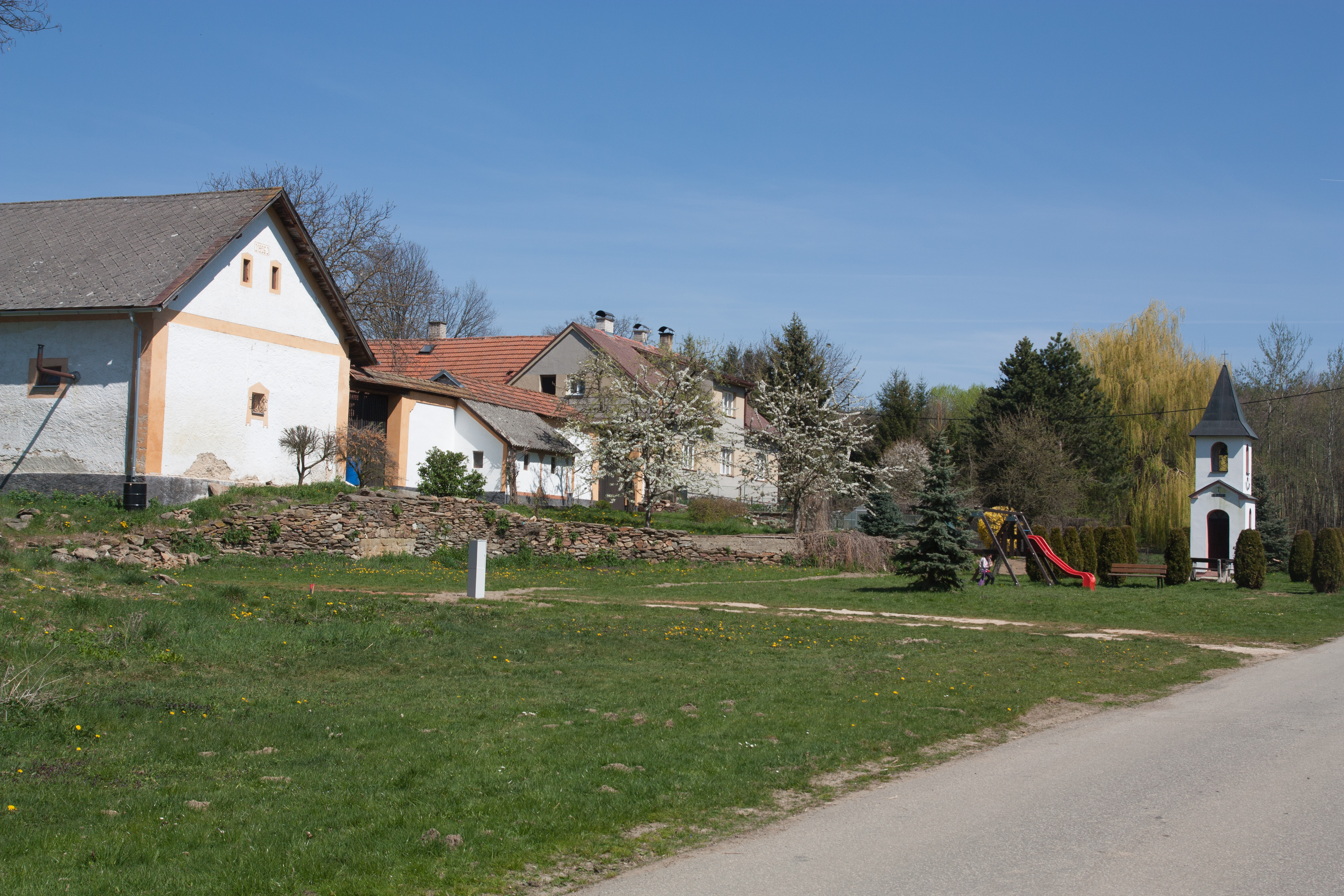
- Mostek, a part of Dolní Hrachovice

- Location in the Czech Republic
- Coordinates: 49°29′10″N 14°47′50″E
- Country: Czech Republic
- Region: South Bohemian
- District: Tábor
- First mentioned: 1550

Area
  - Total: 4.48 km^{2} (1.73 sq mi)
- Elevation: 552 m (1,811 ft)

Population (2026-01-01)
  - Total: 130
  - Density: 29/km^{2} (75/sq mi)
- Time zone: UTC+1 (CET)
  - Summer (DST): UTC+2 (CEST)
- Postal code: 391 43
- Website: www.hrachovice.cz

Dolní Hrachovice is a municipality and village in Tábor District in the South Bohemian Region of the Czech Republic. It has about 100 inhabitants.

Dolní Hrachovice lies approximately 13 kilometres (8 mi) north-east of Tábor, 62 km (39 mi) north of České Budějovice, and 72 km (45 mi) south of Prague.

== Administrative division ==
Dolní Hrachovice consists of three municipal parts (in brackets population according to the 2021 census):

- Dolní Hrachovice (54)
- Horní Hrachovice (28)
- Mostek (45)

== Demographics ==
Historical population
| Year | Pop. | ±% |
|---|---|---|
| 1869 | 449 | — |
| 1880 | 420 | −6.5% |
| 1890 | 415 | −1.2% |
| 1900 | 402 | −3.1% |
| 1910 | 379 | −5.7% |
| 1921 | 352 | −7.1% |
| 1930 | 294 | −16.5% |
| 1950 | 199 | −32.3% |
| 1961 | 202 | +1.5% |
| 1970 | 176 | −12.9% |
| 1980 | 170 | −3.4% |
| 1991 | 149 | −12.4% |
| 2001 | 144 | −3.4% |
| 2011 | 135 | −6.2% |
| 2021 | 127 | −5.9% |
Source: Censuses
