= Ctiboř (Benešov District) =

- Municipality
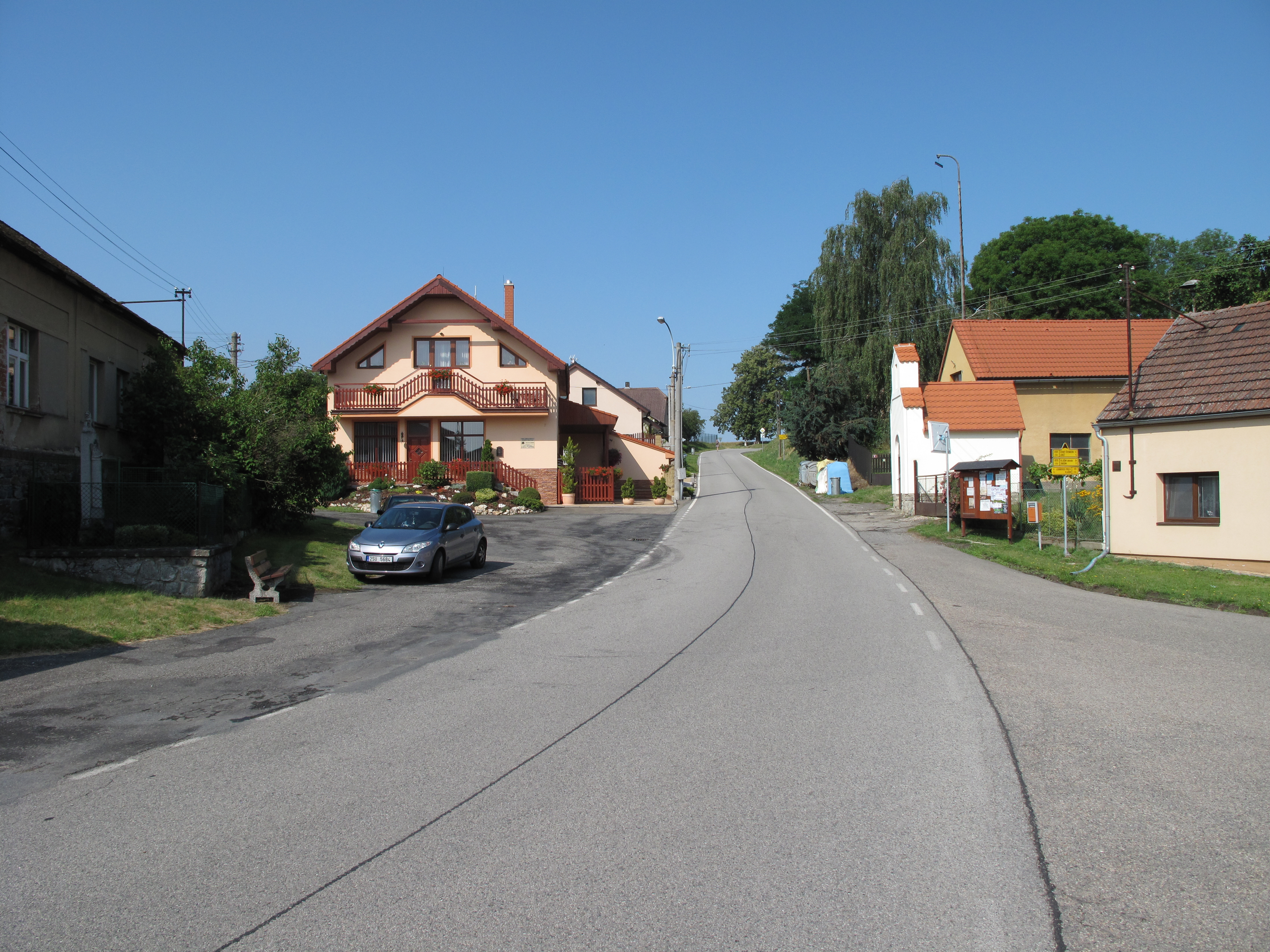
- Centre of Ctiboř

- Location in the Czech Republic
- Coordinates: 49°44′12″N 14°54′15″E
- Country: Czech Republic
- Region: Central Bohemian
- District: Benešov
- First mentioned: 1408

Area
  - Total: 3.92 km^{2} (1.51 sq mi)
- Elevation: 395 m (1,296 ft)

Population (2026-01-01)
  - Total: 176
  - Density: 44.9/km^{2} (116/sq mi)
- Time zone: UTC+1 (CET)
  - Summer (DST): UTC+2 (CEST)
- Postal code: 258 01
- Website: www.obec-ctibor.cz

Ctiboř is a municipality and village in Benešov District in the Central Bohemian Region of the Czech Republic. It has about 200 inhabitants.

== Administrative division ==
Ctiboř consists of two municipal parts (in brackets population according to the 2021 census):

- Ctiboř (147)
- Hrádek (22)

== Etymology ==
The name is derived from the personal name Ctibor, meaning "Ctibor's".

== Geography ==
Ctiboř is located about 16 kilometres (10 mi) east of Benešov and 43 km (27 mi) southeast of Prague. It lies in the Vlašim Uplands. The highest point is at 436 m (1,430 ft) above sea level. The municipality is situated on the left bank of the Blanice River.

== History ==
The first written mention of Ctiboř is from 1408.

== Demographics ==
Historical population

| Year | Pop. | ±% |
|---|---|---|
| 1869 | 256 | — |
| 1880 | 275 | +7.4% |
| 1890 | 270 | −1.8% |
| 1900 | 264 | −2.2% |
| 1910 | 246 | −6.8% |

| Year | Pop. | ±% |
|---|---|---|
| 1921 | 258 | +4.9% |
| 1930 | 192 | −25.6% |
| 1950 | 169 | −12.0% |
| 1961 | 185 | +9.5% |
| 1970 | 150 | −18.9% |

| Year | Pop. | ±% |
|---|---|---|
| 1980 | 138 | −8.0% |
| 1991 | 119 | −13.8% |
| 2001 | 108 | −9.2% |
| 2011 | 116 | +7.4% |
| 2021 | 169 | +45.7% |

Source: Censuses

== Transport ==
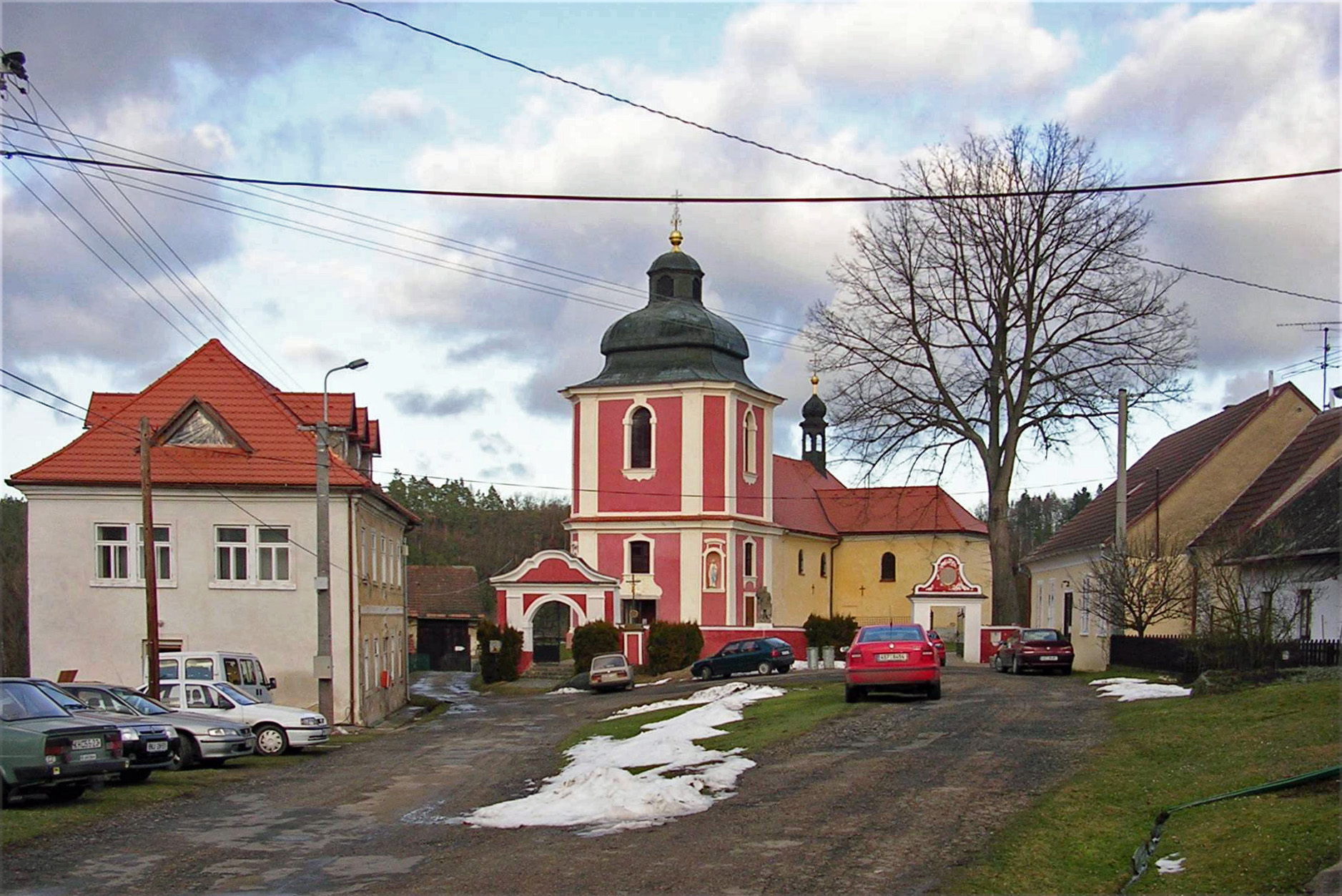
The village of Hrádek

There are no railways or major roads passing through the municipality.

== Sights ==
The most important monument is the Church of Saint Matthew the Apostle in Hrádek. It was built in the late Romanesque style in the first half of the 13th century and then rebuilt in the Baroque style in the 17th century. The church is a pilgrimage site.
