= Hradiště (Benešov District) =

- Municipality
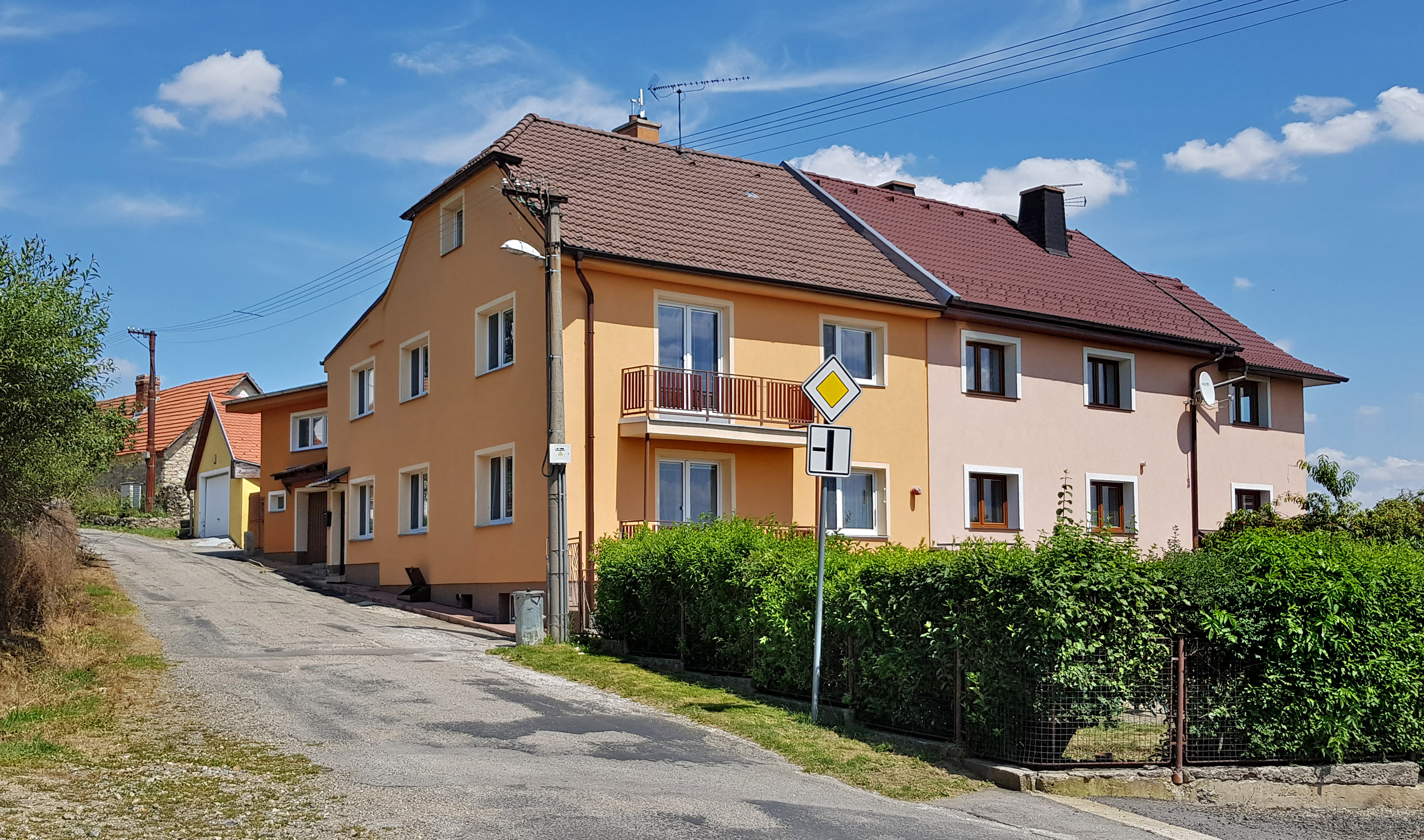
- Municipal office

- Location in the Czech Republic
- Coordinates: 49°41′3″N 14°50′55″E
- Country: Czech Republic
- Region: Central Bohemian
- District: Benešov
- First mentioned: 1289

Area
  - Total: 2.51 km^{2} (0.97 sq mi)
- Elevation: 415 m (1,362 ft)

Population (2026-01-01)
  - Total: 34
  - Density: 14/km^{2} (35/sq mi)
- Time zone: UTC+1 (CET)
  - Summer (DST): UTC+2 (CEST)
- Postal code: 258 01
- Website: www.ouhradiste.cz

Hradiště is a municipality and village in Benešov District in the Central Bohemian Region of the Czech Republic. It has about 30 inhabitants.

== Demographics ==
Historical population
Year	Pop.	±%
1869	116	—
1880	89	−23.3%
1890	106	+19.1%
1900	116	+9.4%
1910	108	−6.9%
1921	94	−13.0%
1930	102	+8.5%
1950	70	−31.4%
1961	55	−21.4%
1970	55	+0.0%
1980	44	−20.0%
1991	46	+4.5%
2001	38	−17.4%
2011	26	−31.6%
2021	28	+7.7%
Source: Censuses
