= Libež =

- Municipality
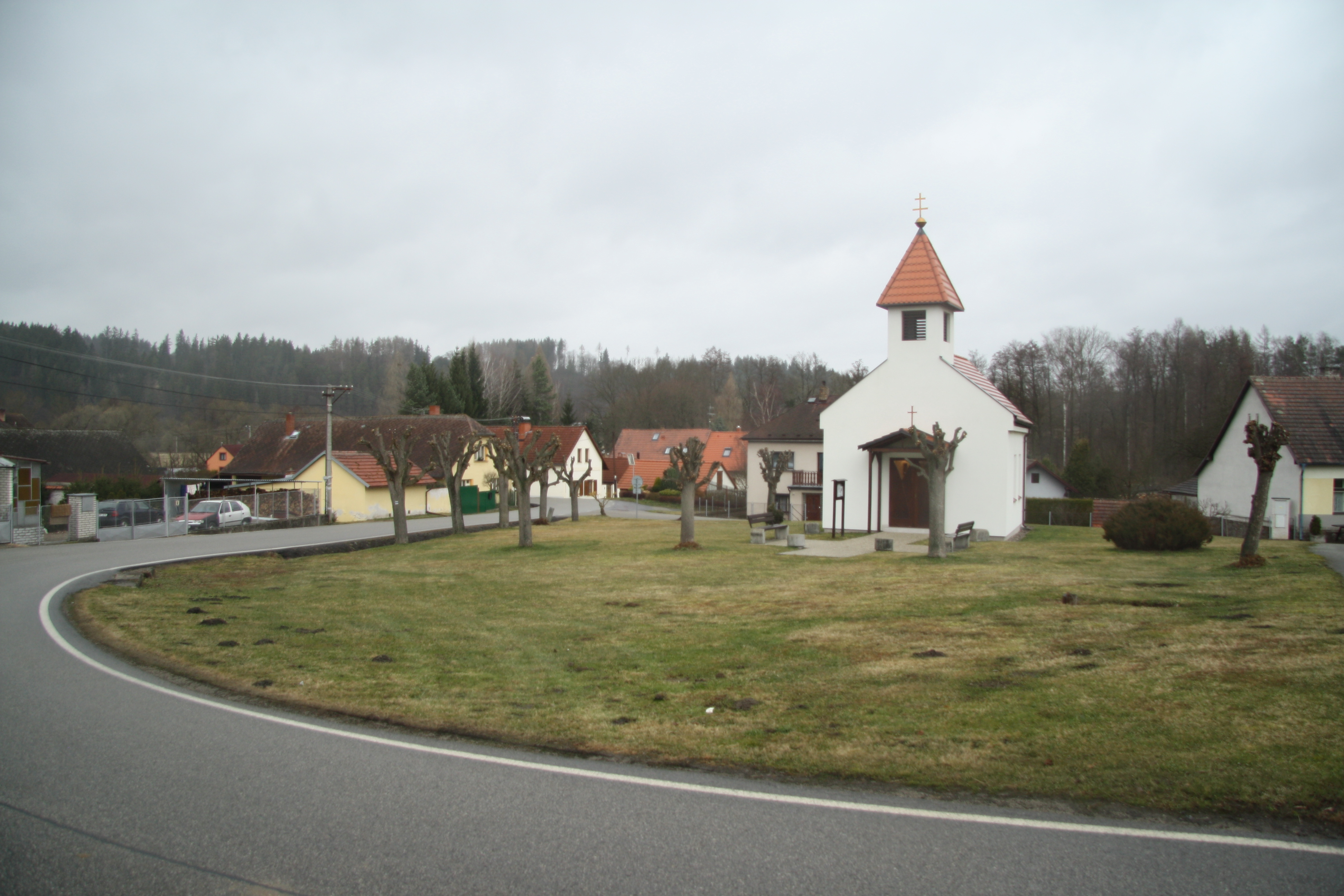
- Centre of Libež with the Chapel of Holy Trinity

- Flag Coat of arms

- Location in the Czech Republic
- Coordinates: 49°45′27″N 14°55′0″E
- Country: Czech Republic
- Region: Central Bohemian
- District: Benešov
- First mentioned: 1326

Area
  - Total: 7.39 km^{2} (2.85 sq mi)
- Elevation: 323 m (1,060 ft)

Population (2026-01-01)
  - Total: 291
  - Density: 39.4/km^{2} (102/sq mi)
- Time zone: UTC+1 (CET)
  - Summer (DST): UTC+2 (CEST)
- Postal code: 257 26
- Website: www.obec-libez.cz

Libež is a municipality and village in Benešov District in the Central Bohemian Region of the Czech Republic. It has about 300 inhabitants.

== Demographics ==
Historical population
Year	Pop.	±%
1869	441	—
1880	445	+0.9%
1890	409	−8.1%
1900	378	−7.6%
1910	387	+2.4%
1921	397	+2.6%
1930	359	−9.6%
1950	246	−31.5%
1961	245	−0.4%
1970	219	−10.6%
1980	177	−19.2%
1991	166	−6.2%
2001	159	−4.2%
2011	166	+4.4%
2021	229	+38.0%
Source: Censuses
