= Kondrac =

- Municipality
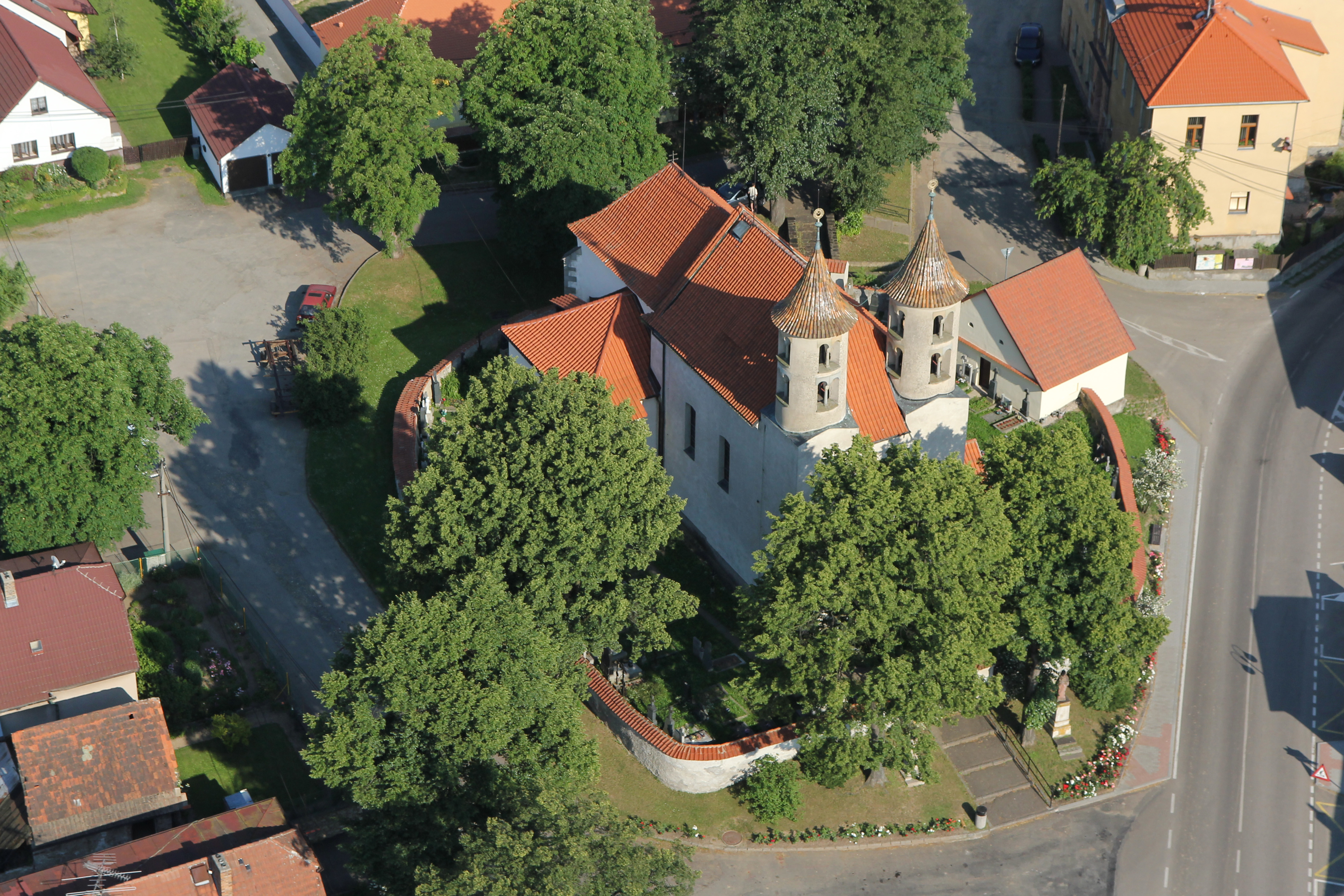
- Centre with the Church of Saint Bartholomew

- Location in the Czech Republic
- Coordinates: 49°40′2″N 14°53′4″E
- Country: Czech Republic
- Region: Central Bohemian
- District: Benešov
- First mentioned: 1318

Area
  - Total: 12.77 km^{2} (4.93 sq mi)
- Elevation: 416 m (1,365 ft)

Population (2026-01-01)
  - Total: 535
  - Density: 41.9/km^{2} (109/sq mi)
- Time zone: UTC+1 (CET)
  - Summer (DST): UTC+2 (CEST)
- Postal code: 258 01
- Website: www.kondrac.cz

Kondrac is a municipality and village in Benešov District in the Central Bohemian Region of the Czech Republic. It has about 500 inhabitants.

== Administrative division ==
Kondrac consists of three municipal parts (in brackets population according to the 2021 census):

- Kondrac (407)
- Dub (89)
- Krasovice (28)

== Demographics ==
Historical population
| Year | Pop. | ±% |
|---|---|---|
| 1869 | 594 | — |
| 1880 | 616 | +3.7% |
| 1890 | 626 | +1.6% |
| 1900 | 671 | +7.2% |
| 1910 | 661 | −1.5% |
| 1921 | 740 | +12.0% |
| 1930 | 679 | −8.2% |
| 1950 | 564 | −16.9% |
| 1961 | 530 | −6.0% |
| 1970 | 441 | −16.8% |
| 1980 | 382 | −13.4% |
| 1991 | 437 | +14.4% |
| 2001 | 469 | +7.3% |
| 2011 | 463 | −1.3% |
| 2021 | 524 | +13.2% |
Source: Censuses

== Notable people ==
- Franz Hauser (1794–1870), singer and voice teacher
