= Ostrov (Benešov District) =

- Municipality
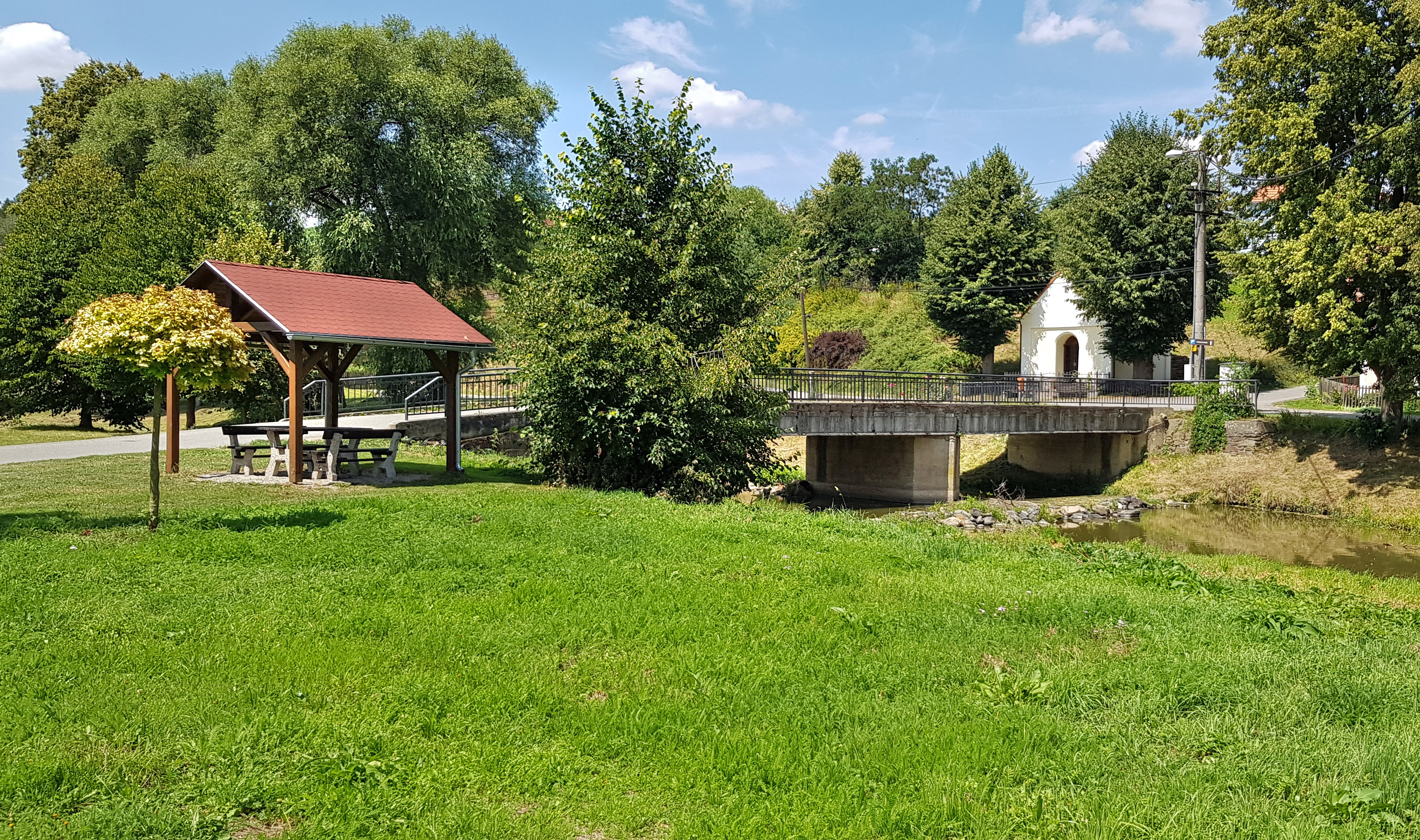
- Common in Ostrov

- Flag Coat of arms

- Location in the Czech Republic
- Coordinates: 49°39′55″N 14°51′4″E
- Country: Czech Republic
- Region: Central Bohemian
- District: Benešov
- First mentioned: 1411

Area
  - Total: 3.36 km^{2} (1.30 sq mi)
- Elevation: 371 m (1,217 ft)

Population (2026-01-01)
  - Total: 74
  - Density: 22/km^{2} (57/sq mi)
- Time zone: UTC+1 (CET)
  - Summer (DST): UTC+2 (CEST)
- Postal code: 257 06
- Website: www.obec-ostrov.com

Ostrov is a municipality and village in Benešov District in the Central Bohemian Region of the Czech Republic. It has about 70 inhabitants.

== Demographics ==
Historical population
Year	Pop.	±%
1869	211	—
1880	226	+7.1%
1890	196	−13.3%
1900	210	+7.1%
1910	211	+0.5%
1921	220	+4.3%
1930	183	−16.8%
1950	150	−18.0%
1961	146	−2.7%
1970	132	−9.6%
1980	89	−32.6%
1991	52	−41.6%
2001	49	−5.8%
2011	58	+18.4%
2021	56	−3.4%
Source: Censuses
