= Zvěstov =

- Municipality
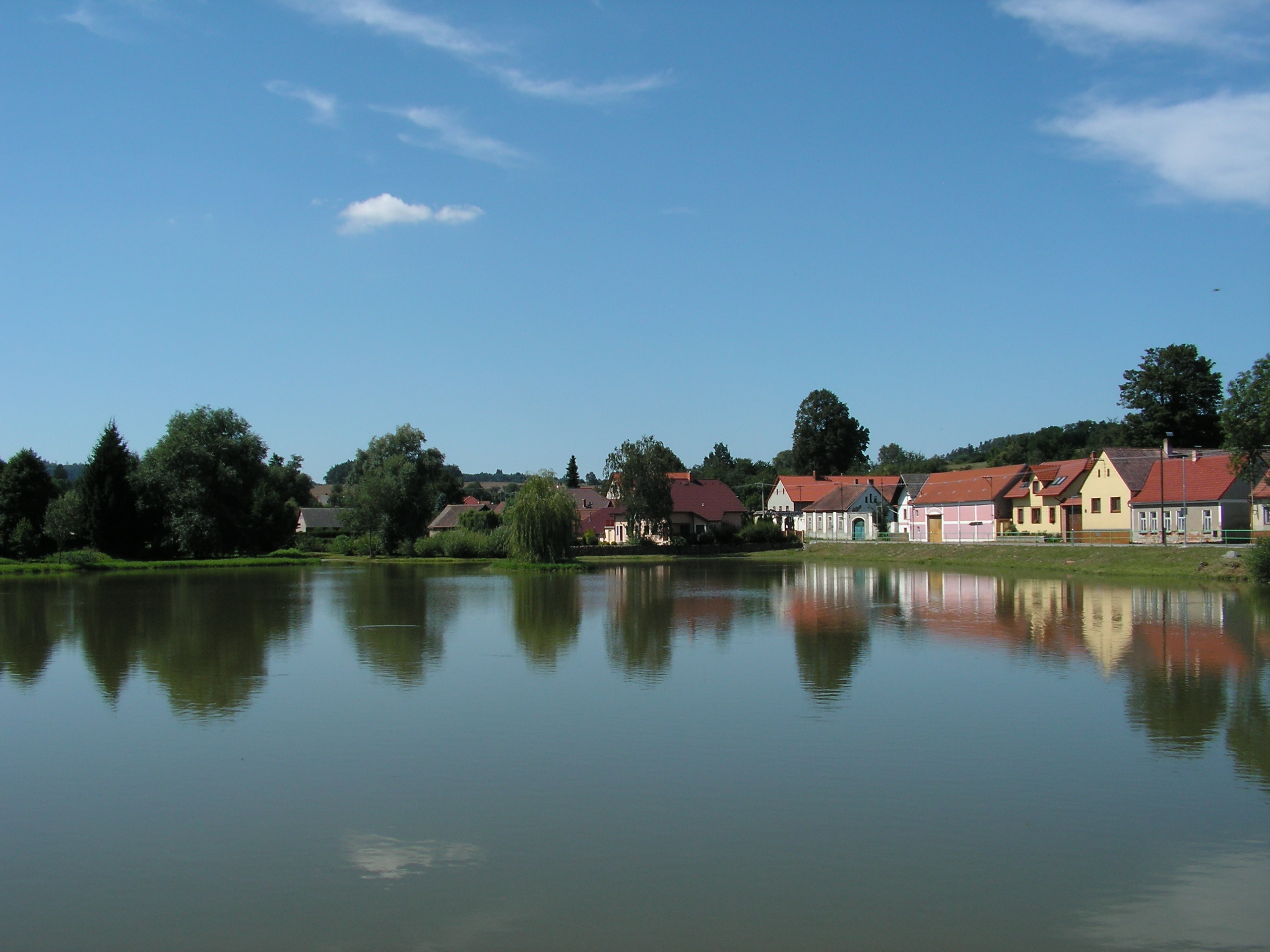
- Pond in the centre of Zvěstov

- Flag Coat of arms

- Location in the Czech Republic
- Coordinates: 49°37′58″N 14°47′32″E
- Country: Czech Republic
- Region: Central Bohemian
- District: Benešov
- First mentioned: 1383

Area
  - Total: 22.39 km^{2} (8.64 sq mi)
- Elevation: 410 m (1,350 ft)

Population (2026-01-01)
  - Total: 429
  - Density: 19.2/km^{2} (49.6/sq mi)
- Time zone: UTC+1 (CET)
  - Summer (DST): UTC+2 (CEST)
- Postal code: 257 06
- Website: www.zvestov.cz

Zvěstov is a municipality and village in Benešov District in the Central Bohemian Region of the Czech Republic. It has about 400 inhabitants.

== Administrative division ==
Zvěstov consists of 11 municipal parts (in brackets population according to the 2021 census):

- Zvěstov (148)
- Bořkovice (21)
- Hlohov (12)
- Laby (20)
- Libouň (65)
- Ondřejovec (6)
- Otradov (6)
- Roudný (91)
- Šlapánov (25)
- Vestec (6)
- Vlastišov (5)

== Etymology ==
The name is derived from the personal name Zvěst.

== Geography ==
Zvěstov is located about 18 kilometres (11 mi) southeast of Benešov and 49 km (30 mi) southeast of Prague. It lies in the Vlašim Uplands. The highest point is the hill Vinná hora at 543 m (1,781 ft) above sea level.

== History ==
The first written mention of Zvěstov is from 1383. Existence of the local fortress was first documented in 1443.

== Demographics ==
Historical population

Year	Pop.	±%
1869	1,346	—
1880	1,434	+6.5%
1890	1,350	−5.9%
1900	1,466	+8.6%
1910	1,621	+10.6%

Year	Pop.	±%
1921	1,612	−0.6%
1930	1,393	−13.6%
1950	1,016	−27.1%
1961	937	−7.8%
1970	796	−15.0%

Year	Pop.	±%
1980	595	−25.3%
1991	457	−23.2%
2001	391	−14.4%
2011	377	−3.6%
2021	405	+7.4%

Source: Censuses

== Transport ==
There are no railways or major roads passing through the municipality.

== Sights ==
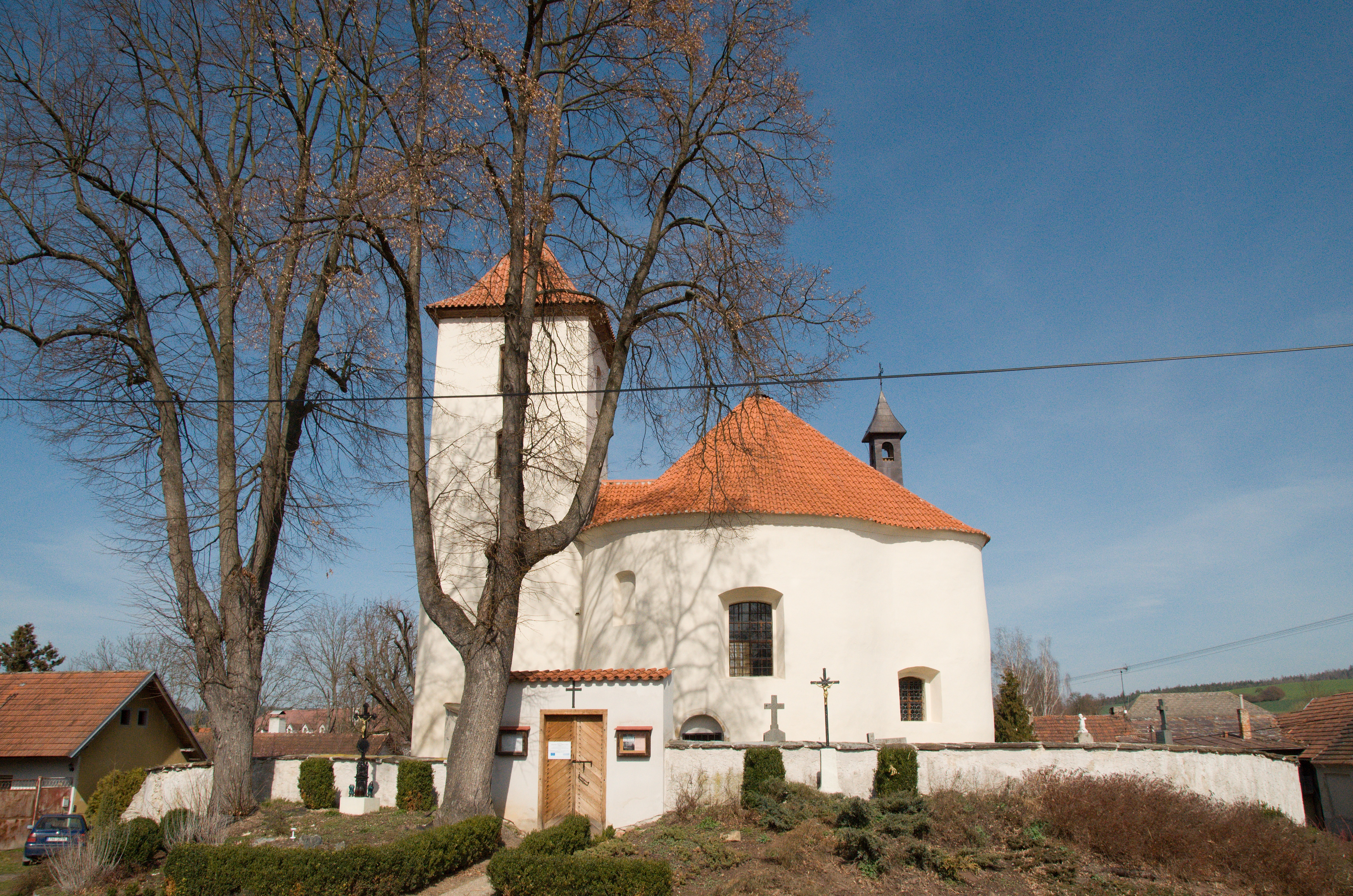
Church of Saint Wenceslaus

The most important monument is the Church of Saint Wenceslaus in Libouň. It is a small church with a Romanesque rotunda from the first half of the 13th century.

The old fortress was rebuilt into a Renaissance castle in the late 16th century. Part of the Renaissance sgraffito on the façade has been preserved. Today the castle is dilapidated and unused.
