= Tehov (Benešov District) =

- Municipality
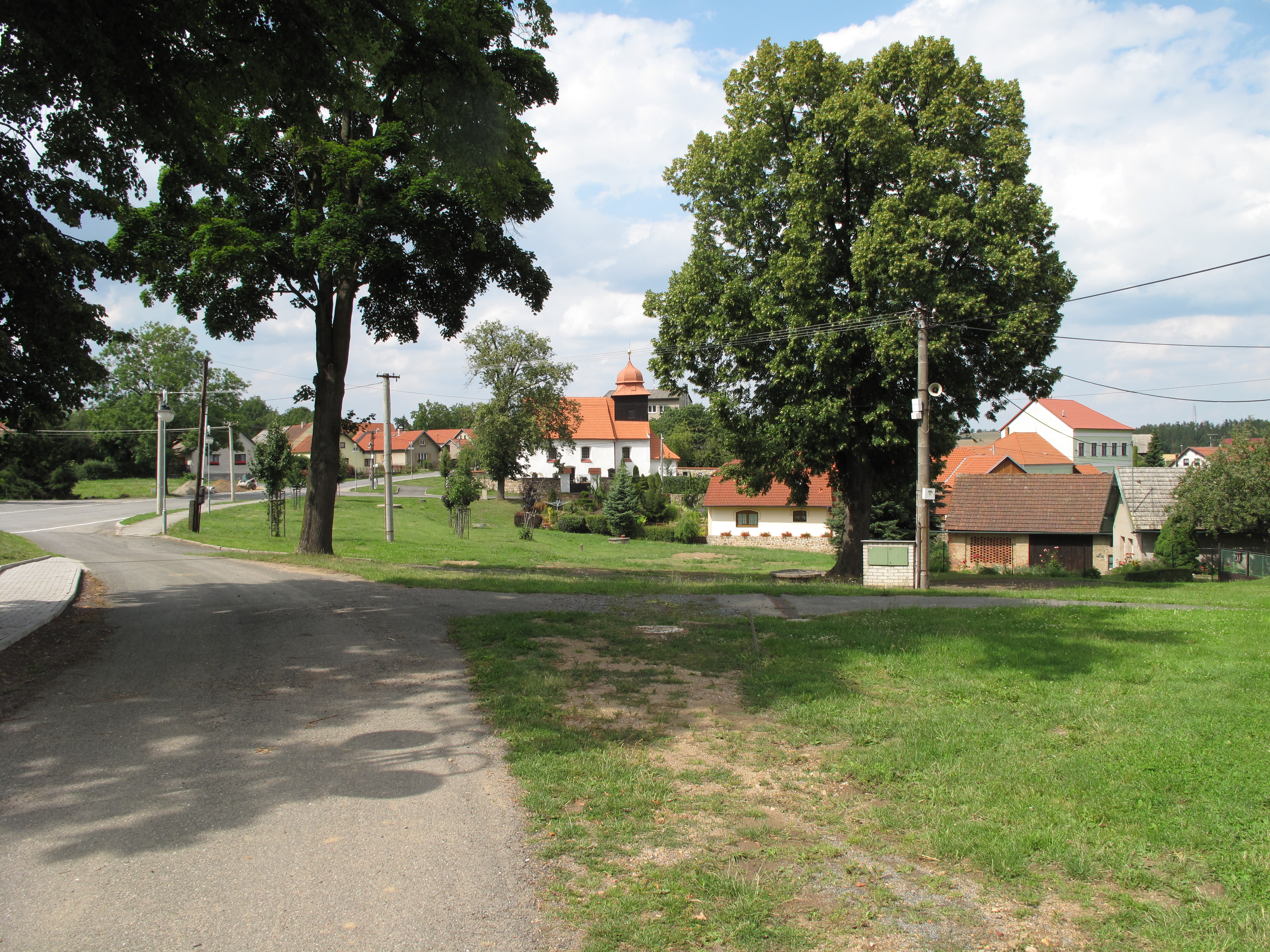
- Centre of Tehov

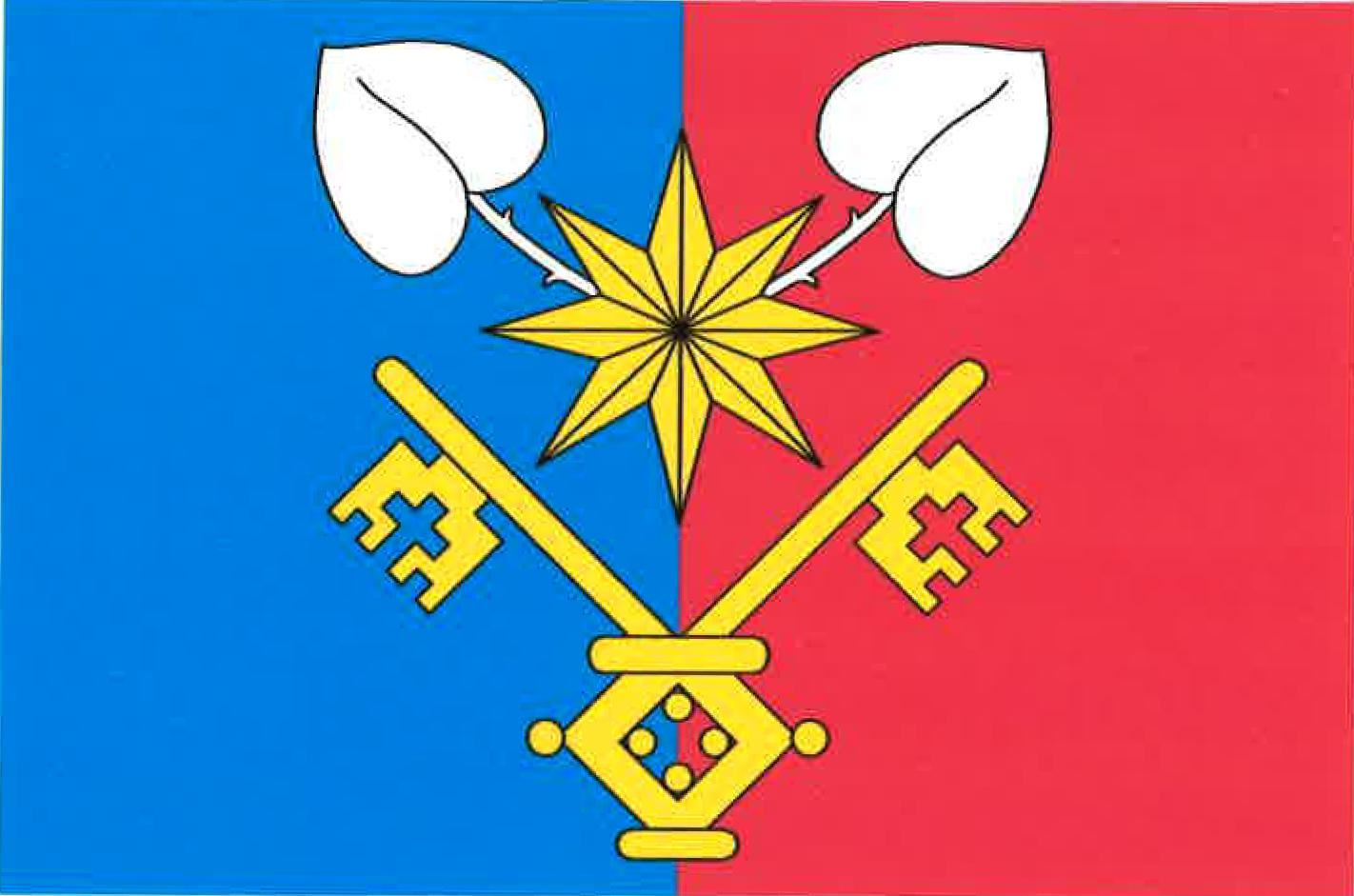
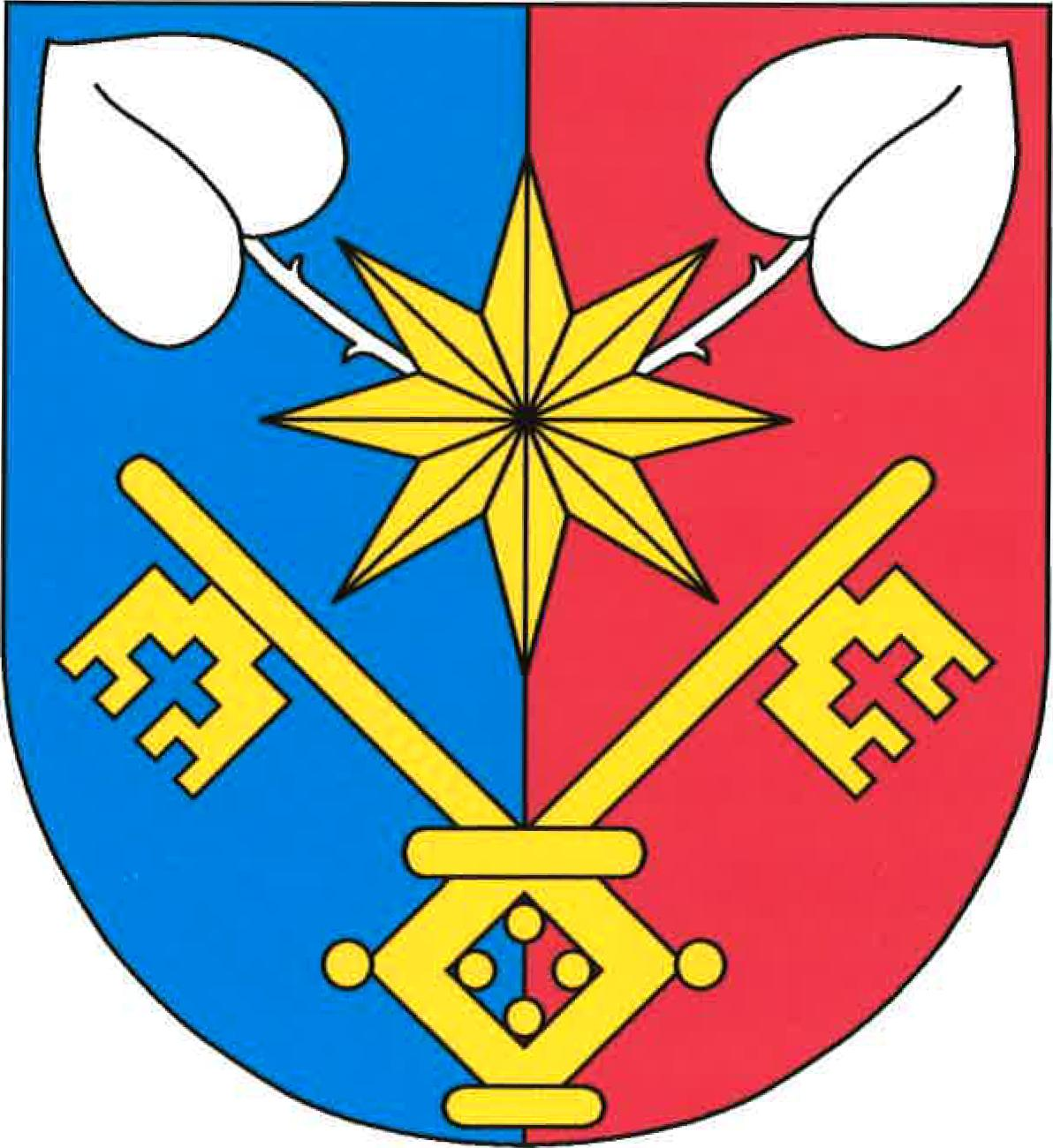
- Flag Coat of arms

- Location in the Czech Republic
- Coordinates: 49°44′8″N 14°58′0″E
- Country: Czech Republic
- Region: Central Bohemian
- District: Benešov
- First mentioned: 1352

Area
  - Total: 10.03 km^{2} (3.87 sq mi)
- Elevation: 452 m (1,483 ft)

Population (2026-01-01)
  - Total: 358
  - Density: 35.7/km^{2} (92.4/sq mi)
- Time zone: UTC+1 (CET)
  - Summer (DST): UTC+2 (CEST)
- Postal code: 258 01
- Website: www.tehov-obec.cz

Tehov is a municipality and village in Benešov District in the Central Bohemian Region of the Czech Republic. It has about 400 inhabitants.

== Administrative division ==
Tehov consists of three municipal parts (in brackets population according to the 2021 census):

- Tehov (281)
- Nemíž (51)
- Petříny (9)

== Etymology ==
The initial name of the settlement was probably Těhov. The name was derived from the personal name Těh, meaning "Těh's (court)".

== Geography ==
Tehov is located about 20 kilometres (12 mi) east of Benešov and 47 km (29 mi) southeast of Prague. It lies in the Vlašim Uplands. The highest point is the hill Kosina at 514 m (1,686 ft) above sea level. The Blanice River flows along the western municipal border.

== History ==
The first written mention of Tehov is from 1352. During the Thirty Years' War the village was burned down and the inhabitants were murdered. After the war, Bedřich of Talmberk bought the village and annexed it to the Vlašim estate. In the next centuries, the owners of Tehov often changed.

== Demographics ==
Historical population

Year	Pop.	±%
1869	444	—
1880	409	−7.9%
1890	433	+5.9%
1900	405	−6.5%
1910	439	+8.4%

Year	Pop.	±%
1921	408	−7.1%
1930	355	−13.0%
1950	306	−13.8%
1961	353	+15.4%
1970	308	−12.7%

Year	Pop.	±%
1980	264	−14.3%
1991	200	−24.2%
2001	329	+64.5%
2011	361	+9.7%
2021	341	−5.5%

Source: Censuses

== Transport ==
There are no railways or major roads passing through the municipality. The D1 motorway from Prague to Brno runs north of Tehov just outside the municipality.

== Sights ==
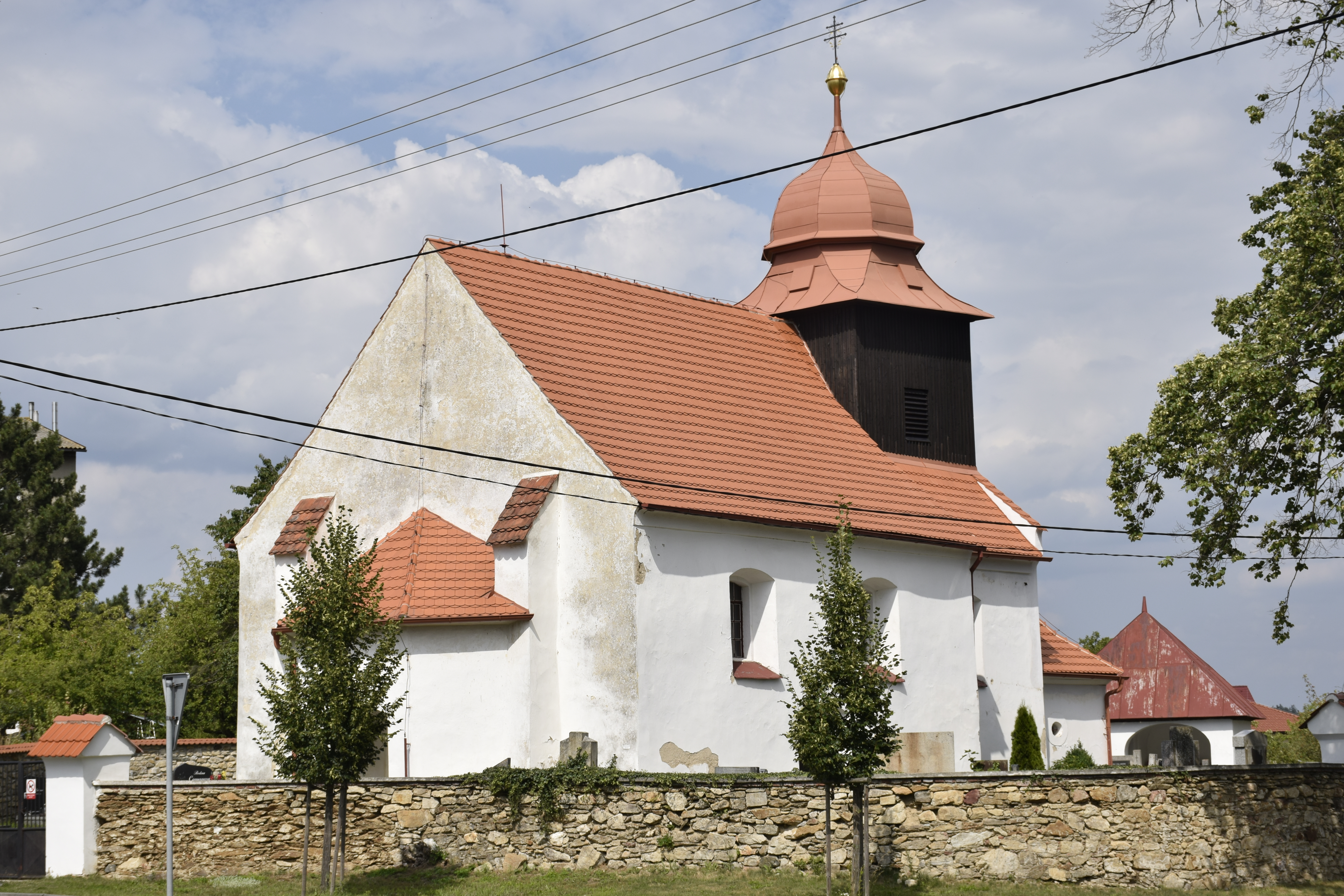
Church of Saint Procopius

The main landmark of Tehov is the Church of Saint Procopius. It was built in the Baroque style in 1771, on the site of a church from the 13th century.
