= Litichovice =

- Municipality
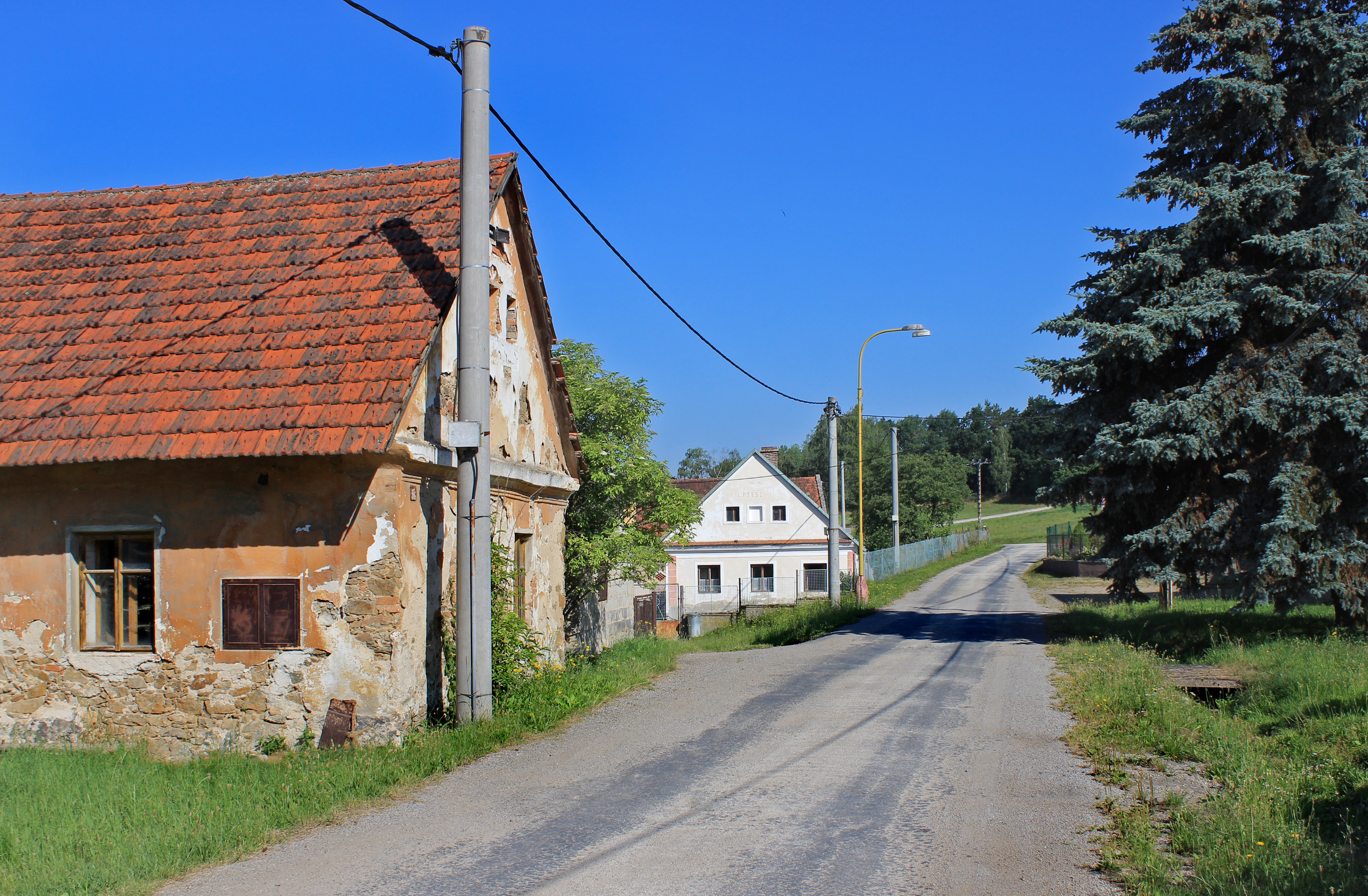
- Main street

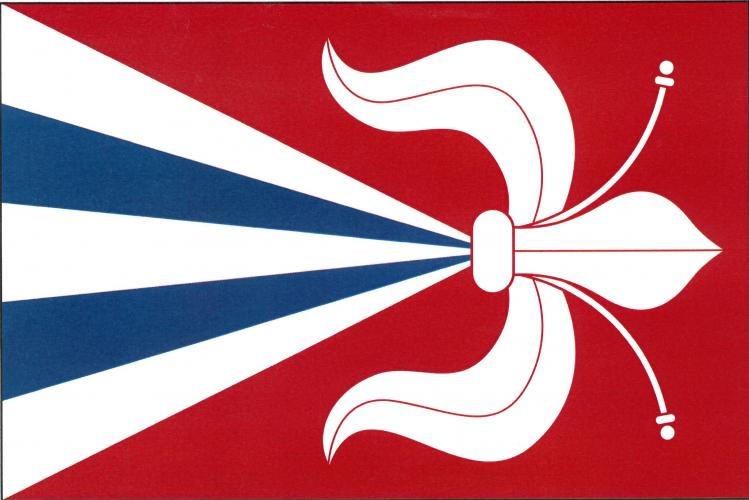
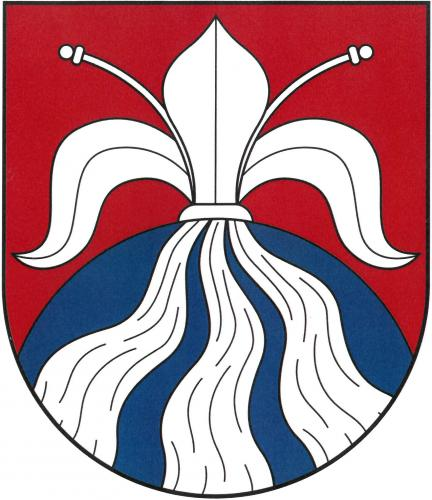
- Flag Coat of arms

- Location in the Czech Republic
- Coordinates: 49°46′59″N 14°51′2″E
- Country: Czech Republic
- Region: Central Bohemian
- District: Benešov
- First mentioned: 1402

Area
  - Total: 1.93 km^{2} (0.75 sq mi)
- Elevation: 465 m (1,526 ft)

Population (2026-01-01)
  - Total: 75
  - Density: 39/km^{2} (100/sq mi)
- Time zone: UTC+1 (CET)
  - Summer (DST): UTC+2 (CEST)
- Postal code: 257 26
- Website: www.litichovice.cz

Litichovice is a municipality and village in Benešov District in the Central Bohemian Region of the Czech Republic. It has about 80 inhabitants.

== Etymology ==
The initial name of the village was Litochovice. It was derived from the personal name Litoch, meaning "the village of Litoch's people". From the turn of the 15th and 16th centuries, the name Litichovice has been used.

== Geography ==
Litichovice is located about 12 kilometres (7 mi) east of Benešov and 38 km (24 mi) southeast of Prague. It lies in the Benešov Uplands. The highest point is at 497 m (1,631 ft) above sea level.

== History ==
The first written mention of Litichovice is from 1402. After the establishment of sovereign municipalities in the mid-19th century, Litichovice was an administrative part of Třebešice. In 1905, it became an independent municipality.

== Demographics ==
Historical population

Year	Pop.	±%
1869	207	—
1880	208	+0.5%
1890	193	−7.2%
1900	144	−25.4%
1910	130	−9.7%

Year	Pop.	±%
1921	125	−3.8%
1930	116	−7.2%
1950	97	−16.4%
1961	95	−2.1%
1970	78	−17.9%

Year	Pop.	±%
1980	63	−19.2%
1991	57	−9.5%
2001	53	−7.0%
2011	48	−9.4%
2021	72	+50.0%

Source: Censuses

== Transport ==
There are no railways or major roads passing through the municipality.

== Sights ==
The main landmark of Litichovice is the Chapel of Our Lady of Lourdes. It was built in the Historicist style in 1927 or shortly before this year.
