= Třebešice (Benešov District) =

- Municipality
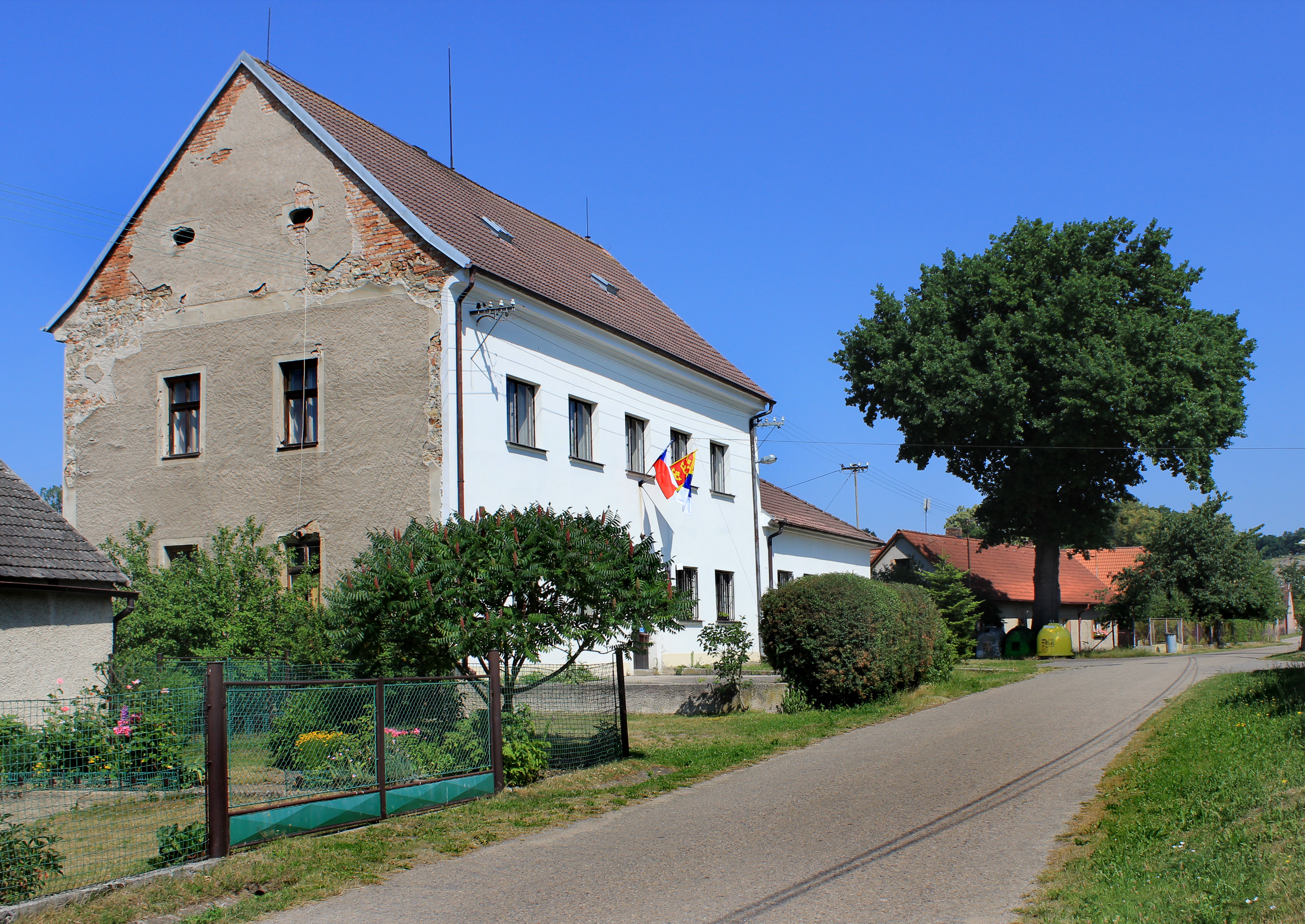
- Municipal office

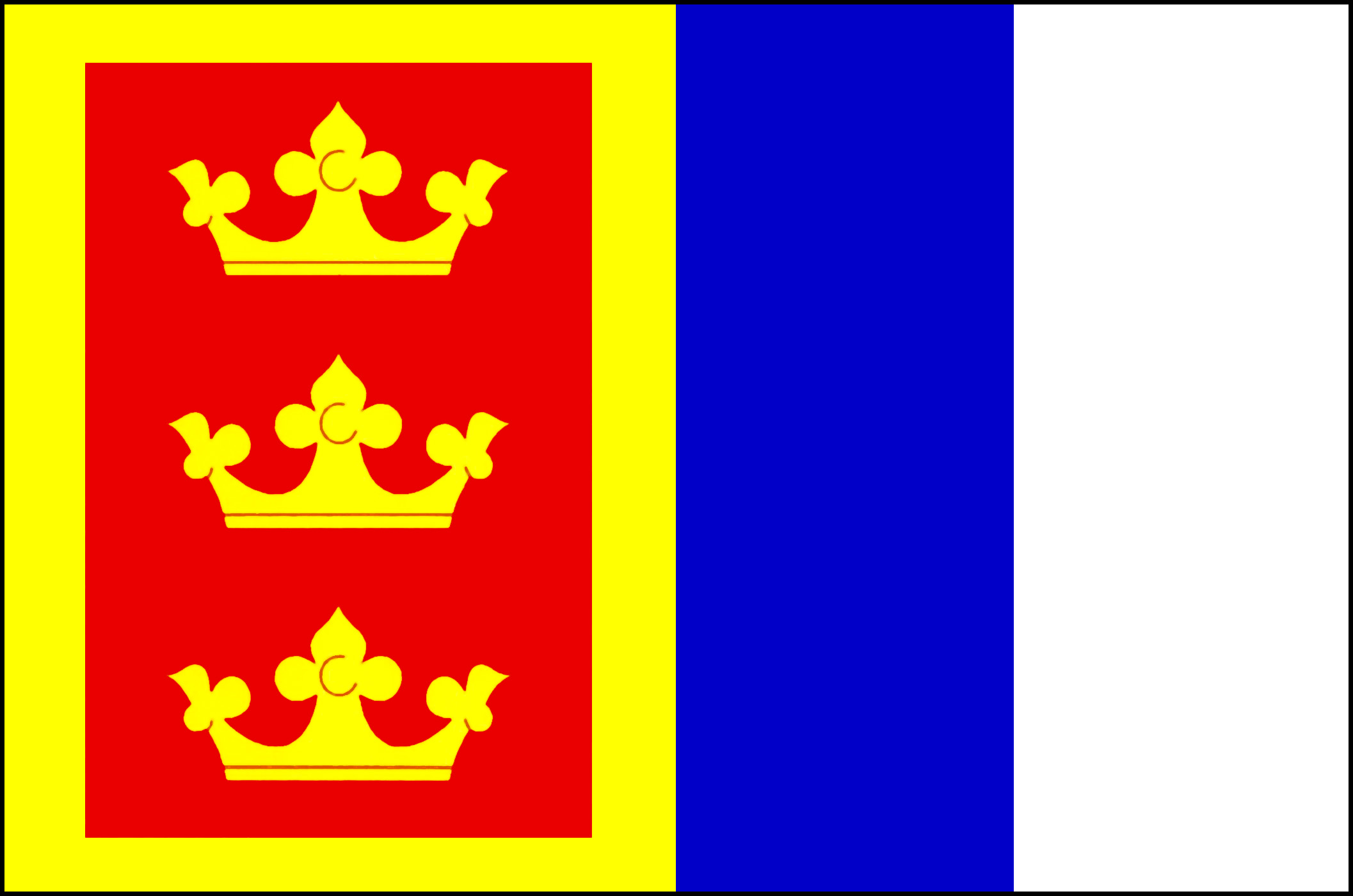
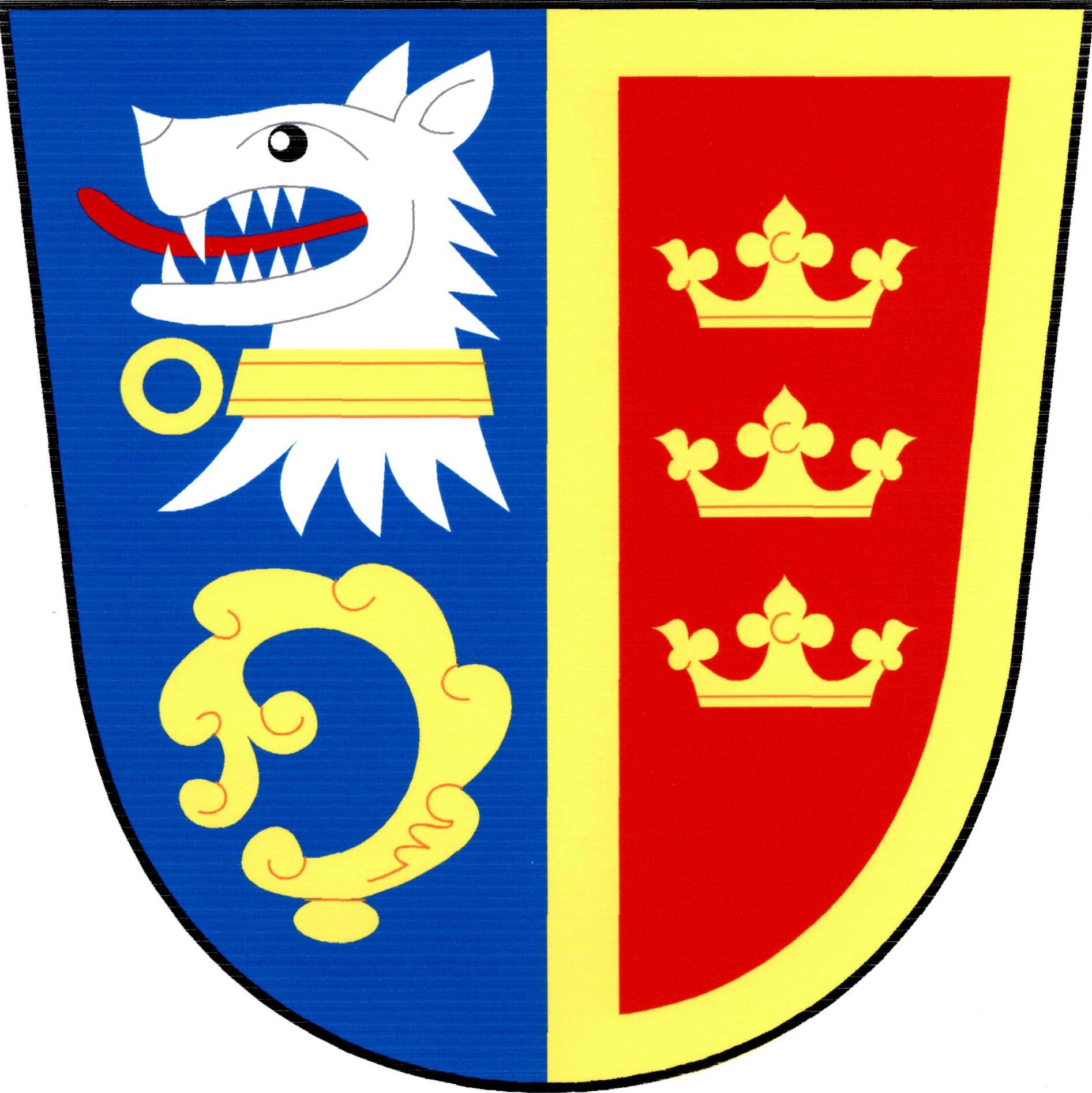
- Flag Coat of arms

- Location in the Czech Republic
- Coordinates: 49°46′31″N 14°49′55″E
- Country: Czech Republic
- Region: Central Bohemian
- District: Benešov
- First mentioned: 1358

Area
  - Total: 4.18 km^{2} (1.61 sq mi)
- Elevation: 431 m (1,414 ft)

Population (2026-01-01)
  - Total: 112
  - Density: 26.8/km^{2} (69.4/sq mi)
- Time zone: UTC+1 (CET)
  - Summer (DST): UTC+2 (CEST)
- Postal code: 257 26
- Website: www.obectrebesice.cz

Třebešice is a municipality and village in Benešov District in the Central Bohemian Region of the Czech Republic. It has about 100 inhabitants.

== Etymology ==
The initial name of the village was Třěběšice. The name was derived from the personal name Třěběš, meaning "the village of Třěběš's people".

== Geography ==
Třebešice is located about 10 kilometres (6 mi) east of Benešov and 37 km (23 mi) southeast of Prague. It lies in the Benešov Uplands. The highest point is at 512 m (1,680 ft) above sea level. The municipal territory is rich in small fishponds.

== History ==
The first written mention of Třebešice is from 1358. There were originally two settlements in the territory of today's municipality: Třebešice and Debrník, but Debrník gradually merged with Třebešice and the last mention of it dates from the first half of the 16th century. From 1752, Třebešice was owned by the Emmaus Monastery in Prague.

== Demographics ==
Historical population

Year	Pop.	±%
1869	321	—
1880	276	−14.0%
1890	338	+22.5%
1900	252	−25.4%
1910	256	+1.6%

Year	Pop.	±%
1921	260	+1.6%
1930	247	−5.0%
1950	159	−35.6%
1961	165	+3.8%
1970	138	−16.4%

Year	Pop.	±%
1980	95	−31.2%
1991	72	−24.2%
2001	76	+5.6%
2011	85	+11.8%
2021	98	+15.3%

Source: Censuses

== Transport ==
There are no railways or major roads passing through the municipality.

== Sights ==
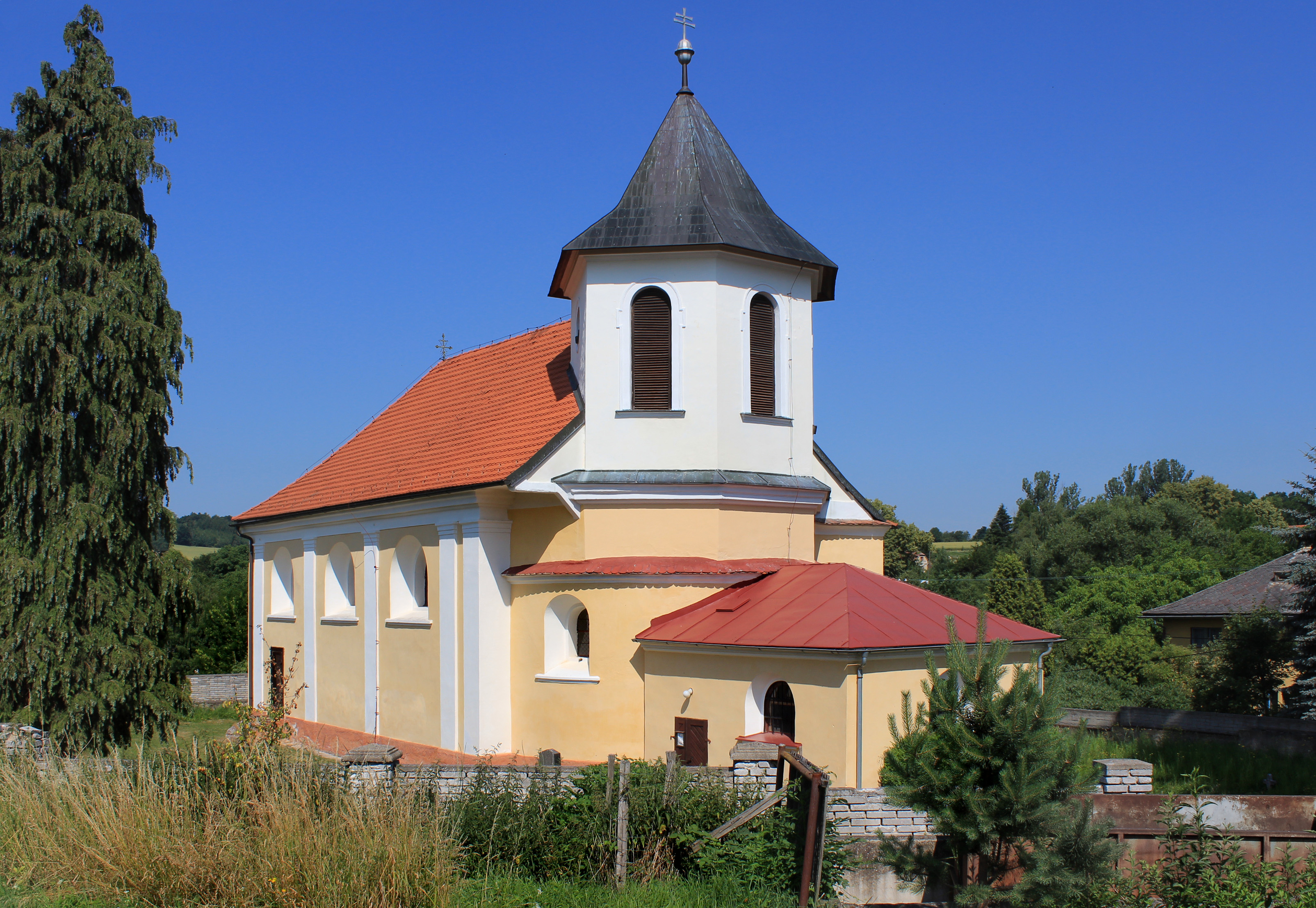
Church of All Saints

The two main landmarks of Třebešice are the church and the castle. The Church of All Saints was built in the Romanesque style in the mid-13th century. In 1768–1769, it was rebuilt in the Baroque style. In 1829, the building was extended.

The Třebešice Castle was built in the Renaissance style second half of the 16th century. It was rebuilt in the Baroque style in the third quarter of the 17th century. Further modifications took place in 1846 and at the turn of the 19th and 20th centuries. The castle complex has an area of 6 ha (15 acres) and includes several buildings, a park and an orchard. Today, the castle is privately owned and used for accommodation.
