= Vítonice =

Vítonice may refer to places in the Czech Republic:

- Vítonice (Kroměříž District), a municipality and village in the Zlín Region
- Vítonice (Znojmo District), a municipality and village in the South Moravian Region
- Vítonice, a village and part of Blažejovice in the Central Bohemian Region
