= Vítonice (Znojmo District) =

- Municipality
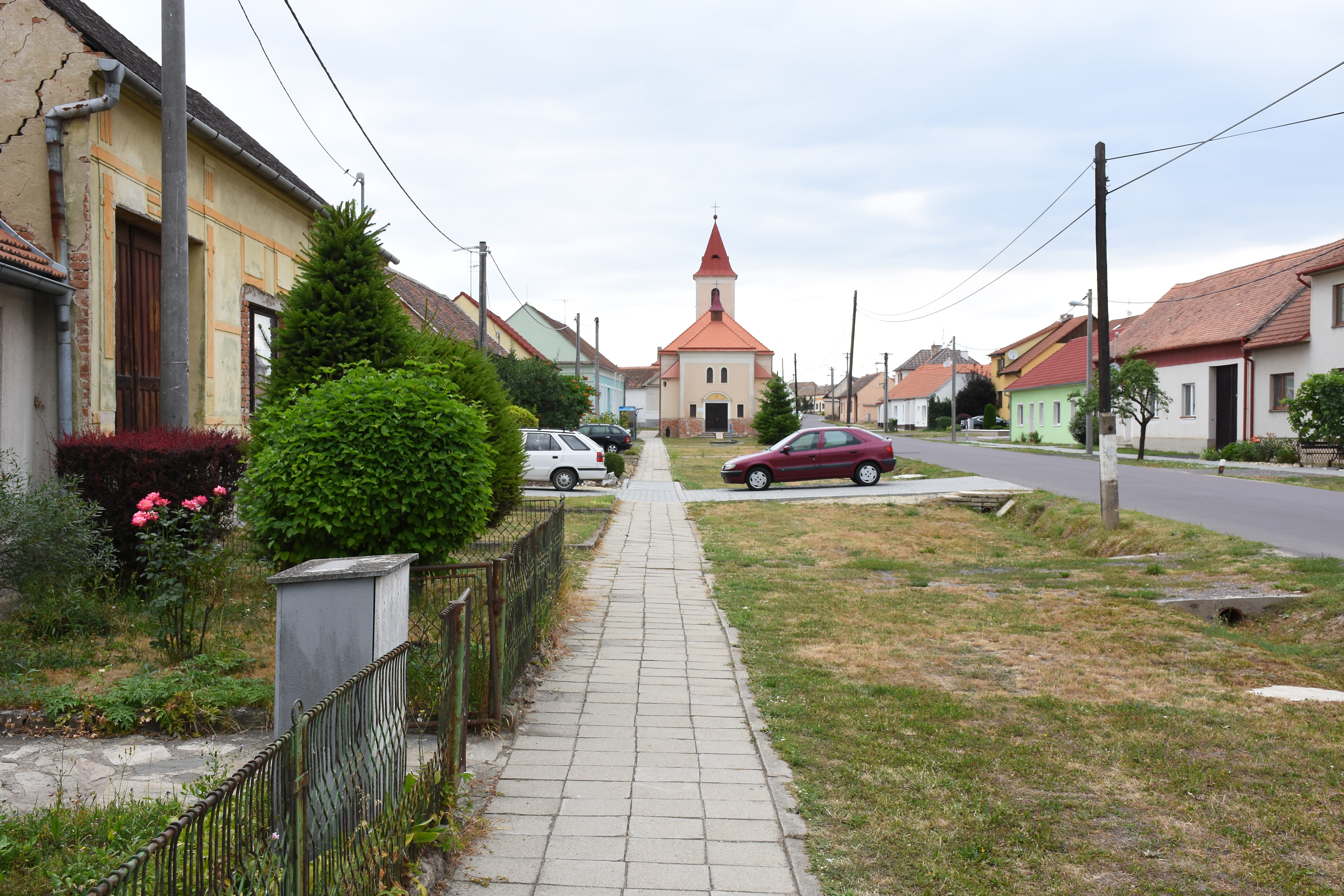
- Chapel of the Exaltation of the Holy Cross

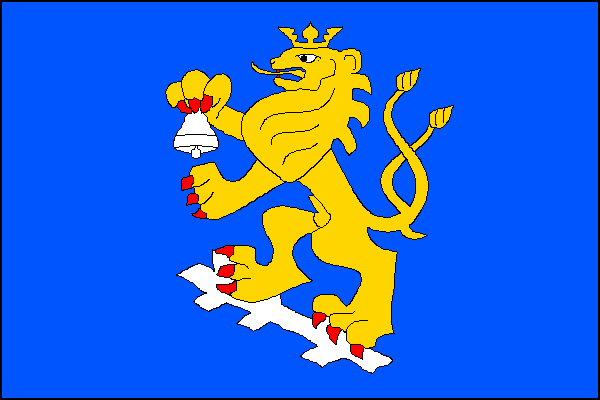
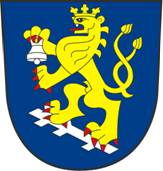
- Flag Coat of arms

- Location in the Czech Republic
- Coordinates: 48°55′10″N 16°11′56″E
- Country: Czech Republic
- Region: South Moravian
- District: Znojmo
- First mentioned: 1351

Area
  - Total: 5.80 km^{2} (2.24 sq mi)
- Elevation: 202 m (663 ft)

Population (2026-01-01)
  - Total: 287
  - Density: 49.5/km^{2} (128/sq mi)
- Time zone: UTC+1 (CET)
  - Summer (DST): UTC+2 (CEST)
- Postal code: 671 61
- Website: www.vitonice.info

Vítonice is a municipality and village in Znojmo District in the South Moravian Region of the Czech Republic. It has about 300 inhabitants.

Vítonice lies approximately 16 kilometres (10 mi) north-east of Znojmo, 43 km (27 mi) south-west of Brno, and 183 km (114 mi) south-east of Prague.

== Demographics ==
Historical population
Year	Pop.	±%
1869	331	—
1880	396	+19.6%
1890	390	−1.5%
1900	408	+4.6%
1910	418	+2.5%
1921	408	−2.4%
1930	422	+3.4%
1950	328	−22.3%
1961	317	−3.4%
1970	270	−14.8%
1980	235	−13.0%
1991	205	−12.8%
2001	209	+2.0%
2011	251	+20.1%
2021	229	−8.8%
Source: Censuses
