= Václav Klement =

Czech entrepreneur and industrialist (1868–1938)

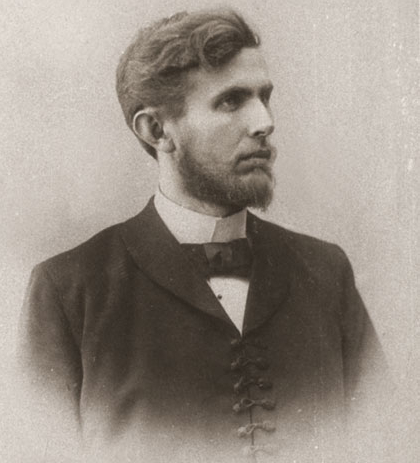
- Václav Klement in 1894
- Born: 16 October 1868; Velvary, Bohemia, Austria-Hungary
- Died: 13 August 1938 (aged 69); Mladá Boleslav, Czechoslovakia
- Occupations: Entrepreneur, industrialist, automotive pioneer

Václav Klement (16 October 1868 – 13 August 1938) was a Czech entrepreneur, industrialist and automotive pioneer. He, along with Václav Laurin, founded automobile manufacturer Laurin & Klement that later became Škoda Auto, the largest Czech company.

== Early life ==
Klement was born on 16 October 1868 in Velvary. He had an unhappy childhood. His mother died when he was young, and he was raised by his stepmother. From the age of 14 he worked manual jobs, but was also a good student, and became an apprentice in a bookshop in the town of Slaný while finishing his secondary studies.

After some time working in Prague, Klement moved to Mladá Boleslav, where he worked in another bookshop. When the owner of the bookshop died Klement bought it, but the business did not prosper and Klement had to sell the bookshop to pay off his debts.

== Laurin & Klement ==
Together with Václav Laurin, Klement started a business repairing bicycles, based on Klement's business acumen and Laurin's technical knowledge. In 1895, they founded the Laurin & Klement Company, producing their own bicycles, known as Slavia bicycles. In 1899 they went on to produce motorcycles, which were sold both domestically and on the international market, and used in sport competitions. In 1902, Laurin & Klement motorcycles were successful in the Paris—Vienna race, the only motorcycles that were able to complete the 1430 km (888 mile) race without any breakdowns in 31 hours.

Soon the company stopped producing bicycles to focus on the production of motorcycles. By 1903 the company had around 200 employees and was producing around 2,000 motorcycles each year. In 1905 the company started making cars, and in 1907 it expanded, registered on the stock exchange, and stopped motorcycle production.

In 1925 the Laurin & Klement Company joined the Škoda Works in Plzeň in and the name of the factory was changed to Laurin & Klement – Škoda, subsequently only Škoda.
