= Pěnčín (Liberec District) =

- Municipality
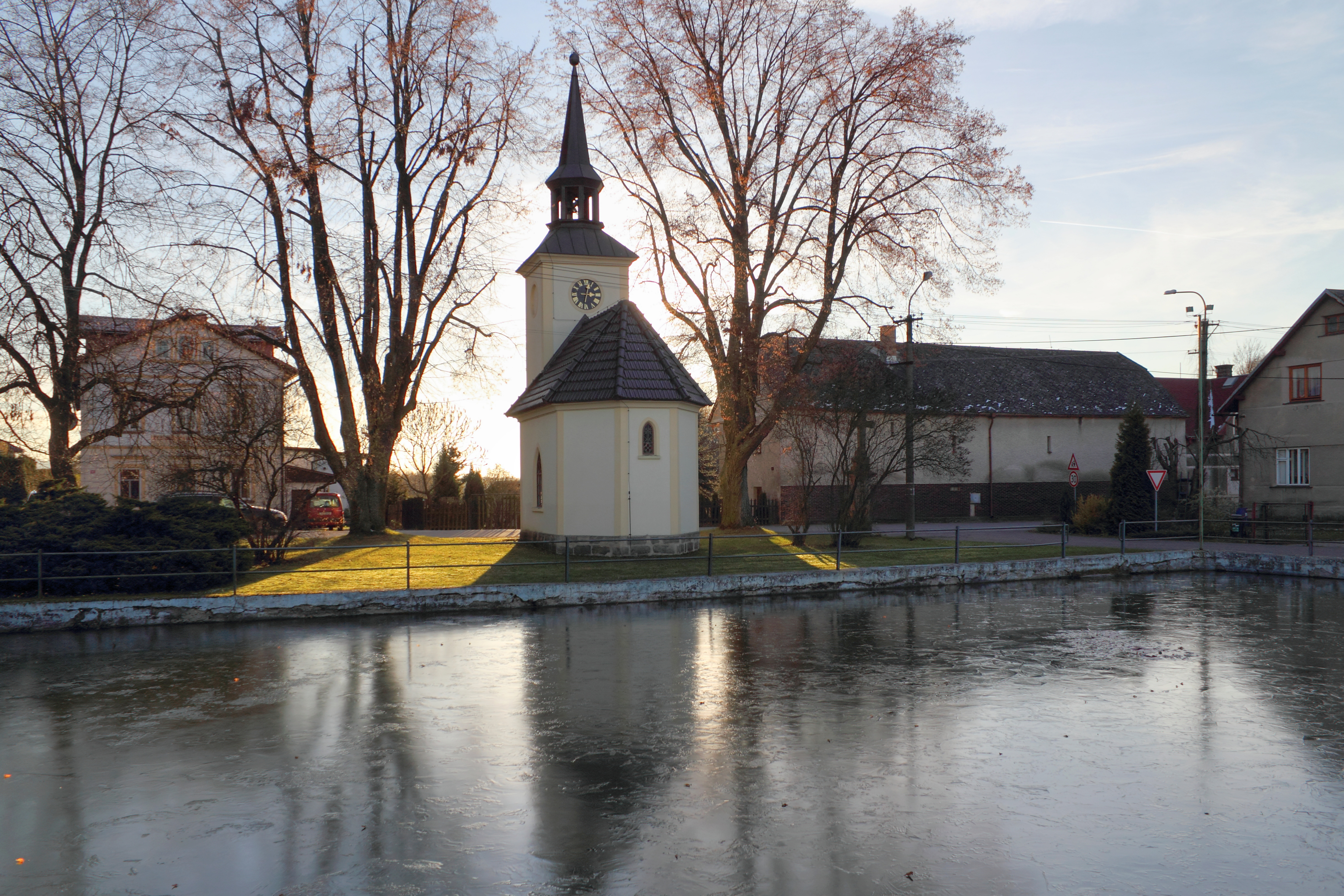
- Chapel in the centre of Pěnčín

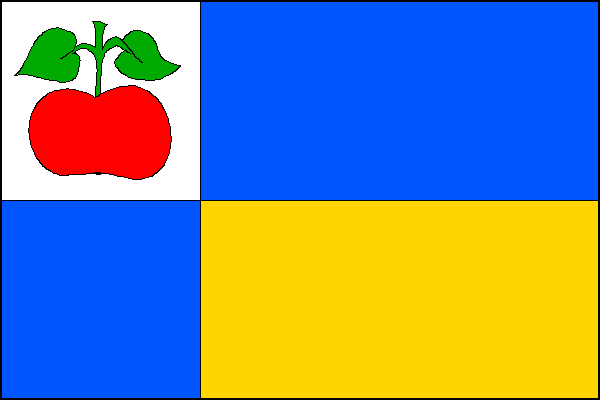
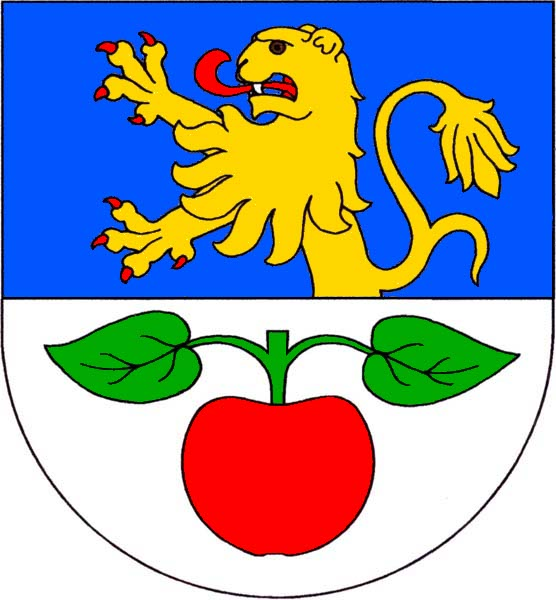
- Flag Coat of arms

- Location in the Czech Republic
- Coordinates: 50°35′42″N 15°4′34″E
- Country: Czech Republic
- Region: Liberec
- District: Liberec
- First mentioned: 1383

Area
  - Total: 8.89 km^{2} (3.43 sq mi)
- Elevation: 256 m (840 ft)

Population (2026-01-01)
  - Total: 745
  - Density: 83.8/km^{2} (217/sq mi)
- Time zone: UTC+1 (CET)
  - Summer (DST): UTC+2 (CEST)
- Postal code: 463 45
- Website: www.pencin-obec.cz

Pěnčín (Czech pronunciation: [ˈpjɛntʃiːn]; German: Pientschin) is a municipality and village in Liberec District in the Liberec Region of the Czech Republic. It has about 700 inhabitants.

== Administrative division ==
Pěnčín consists of seven municipal parts (in brackets population according to the 2021 census):

- Pěnčín (455)
- Albrechtice (32)
- Červenice (59)
- Kamení (37)
- Střížovice (26)
- Vitanovice (80)
- Zásada (18)

== Demographics ==
Historical population
Year	Pop.	±%
1869	1,037	—
1880	1,076	+3.8%
1890	1,093	+1.6%
1900	1,085	−0.7%
1910	1,010	−6.9%
1921	1,053	+4.3%
1930	932	−11.5%
1950	736	−21.0%
1961	634	−13.9%
1970	562	−11.4%
1980	589	+4.8%
1991	593	+0.7%
2001	594	+0.2%
2011	668	+12.5%
2021	707	+5.8%
Source: Censuses

== Notable people ==
- Václav Laurin (1865–1930), engineer, industrialist and automotive pioneer
