= Václav Laurin =

Czech engineer and industrialist (1865–1930)

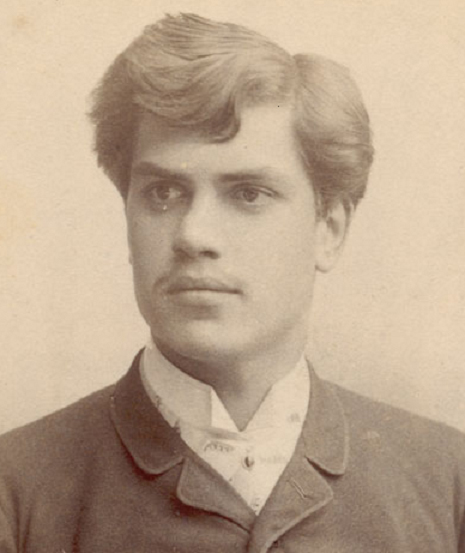
- Václav Laurin in 1893
- Born: 27 September 1865; Kamení, Bohemia, Austrian Empire
- Died: 3 December 1930 (aged 65); Prague, Czechoslovakia
- Occupations: Engineer, industrialist, automotive pioneer

Václav Laurin (27 September 1865 – 3 December 1930) was a Czech engineer, industrialist and automotive pioneer. He, along with Václav Klement, founded automobile manufacturer Laurin & Klement that later became Škoda Auto, the largest Czech company.

== Biography ==
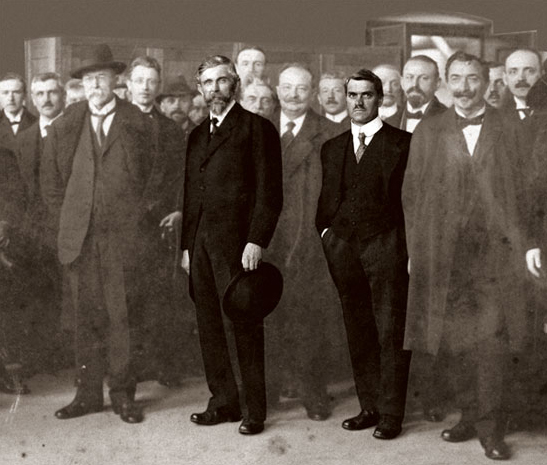
Václav Laurin (right) and Václav Klement (middle, both highlighted) next to the Czechoslovak president Tomáš Garrigue Masaryk (left)

Laurin was born on 27 September 1865 in Kamení, Bohemia, Austrian Empire (today part of Pěnčín, Czech Republic). He apprenticed as a locksmith in Mladá Boleslav in 1883–1886. In 1893, he studied the design and basics of steam engines in Dresden. In 1894, he married Emilie Marie Beranová. In 1895, he met Václav Klement in Mladá Boleslav. They became friends and in September of the same year they established the company Laurin & Klement in Mladá Boleslav.

At the beginning of December 1895, the mechanic Václav Laurin and the bookseller Václav Klement, both bicycle enthusiasts, started manufacturing bicycles of their own design, patriotically named Slavia in the nationalist atmosphere of the end of the 19th century. From 1899, the company manufactured motorcycles. Thanks to Laurin's innovations and Klement's business skills, the company experienced rapid development and began exporting motorcycles all over the world. In 1905, Laurin manufactured their first automobile called Laurin & Klement A – voiturette.

Laurin was prominently engaged in the Laurin & Klement company and contributed significantly to its success. He participated in the construction of vehicles. Since 1925, when Laurin and Klement sold their company to Škoda Works, the company has been known as Škoda Auto. From the merger until Laurin's death, he remained technical director of the company, but no longer had any influence on the company's operations.

Laurin died on 3 December 1930 in Prague. He is buried in Mladá Boleslav, close to Václav Klement.

== Honours ==
There is a memorial plaque on Laurin's birthplace, house No. 9 in the village of Kamení.

A street in the center of Mladá Boleslav is named Laurinova in honor of Václav Laurin.

The Memorial of Václav Laurin and Václav Klement, which includes statues of both men, stands in front of the Škoda Museum in Mladá Boleslav. It was made of bronze in 2005.

== Gallery ==
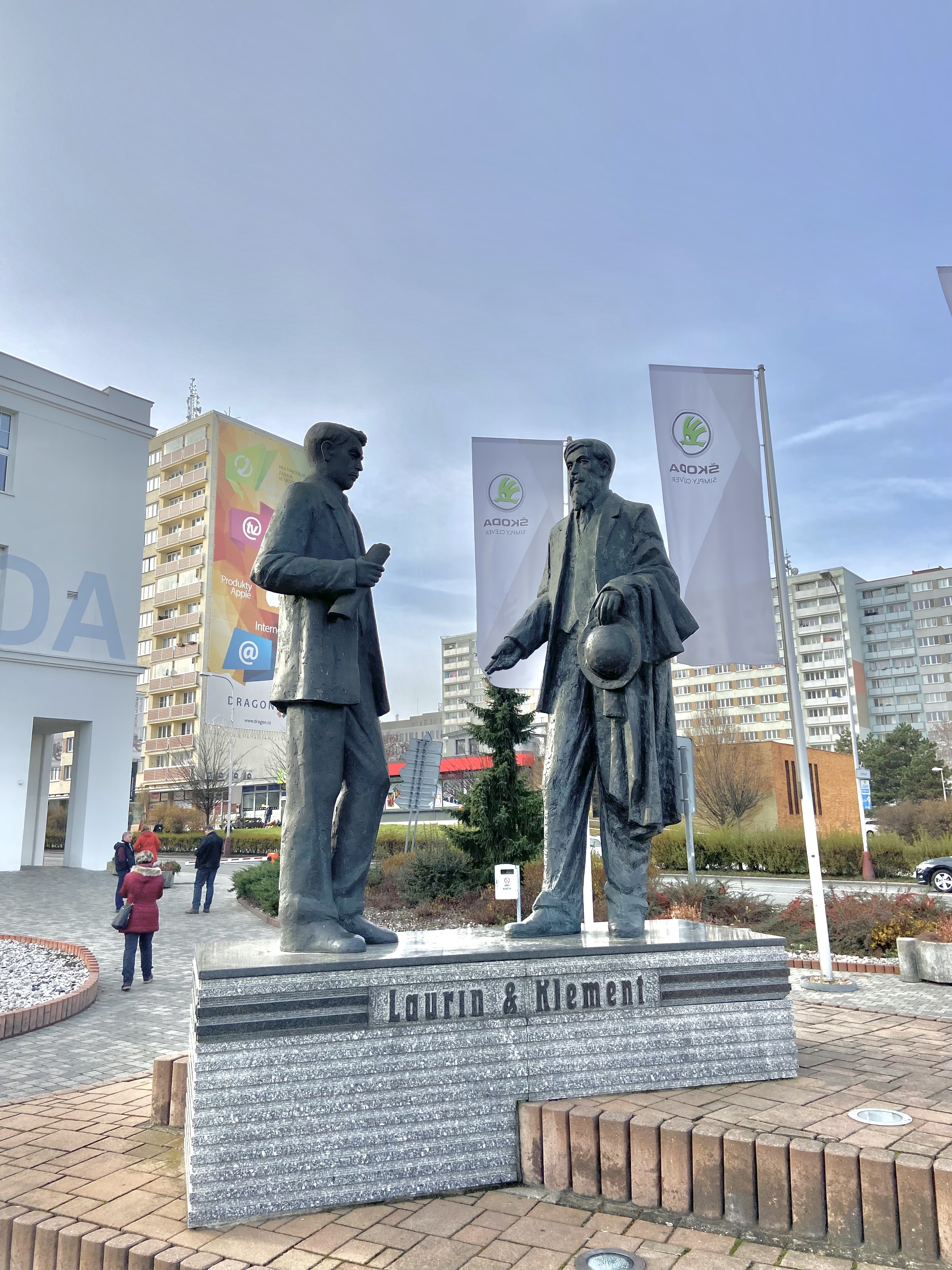
Memorial of Václav Laurin and Václav Klement

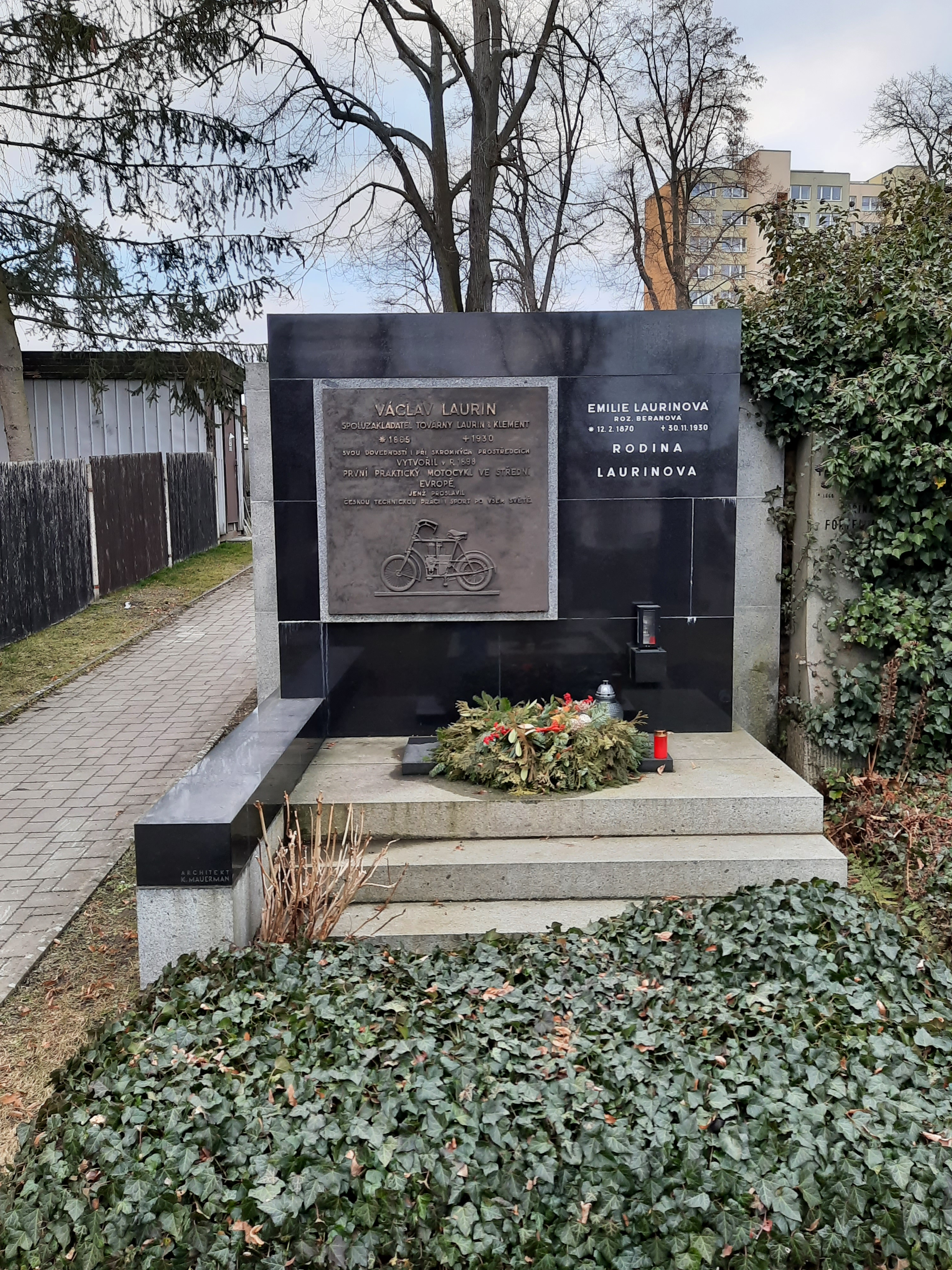
Tomb of Václav Laurin and his family

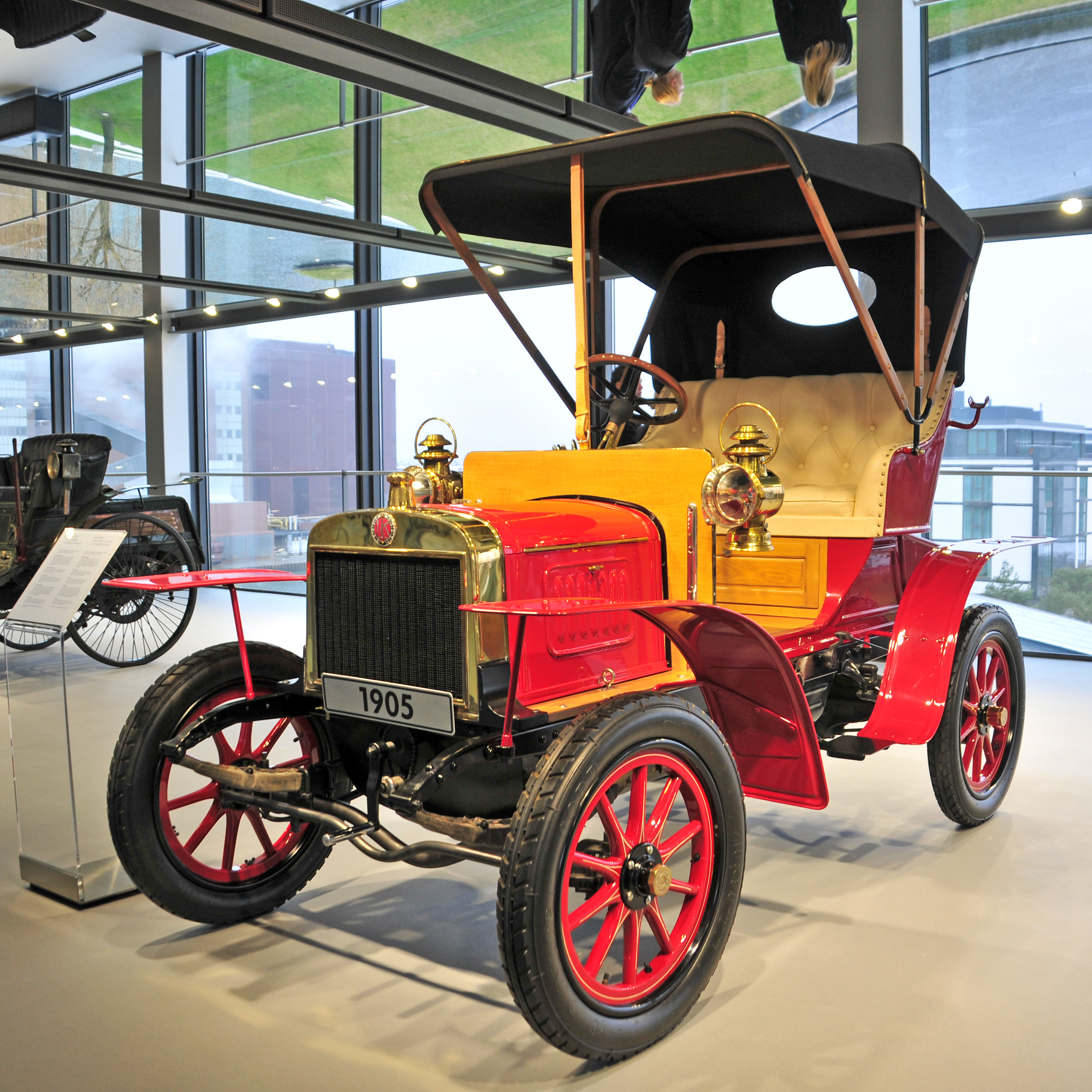
Laurin & Klement A

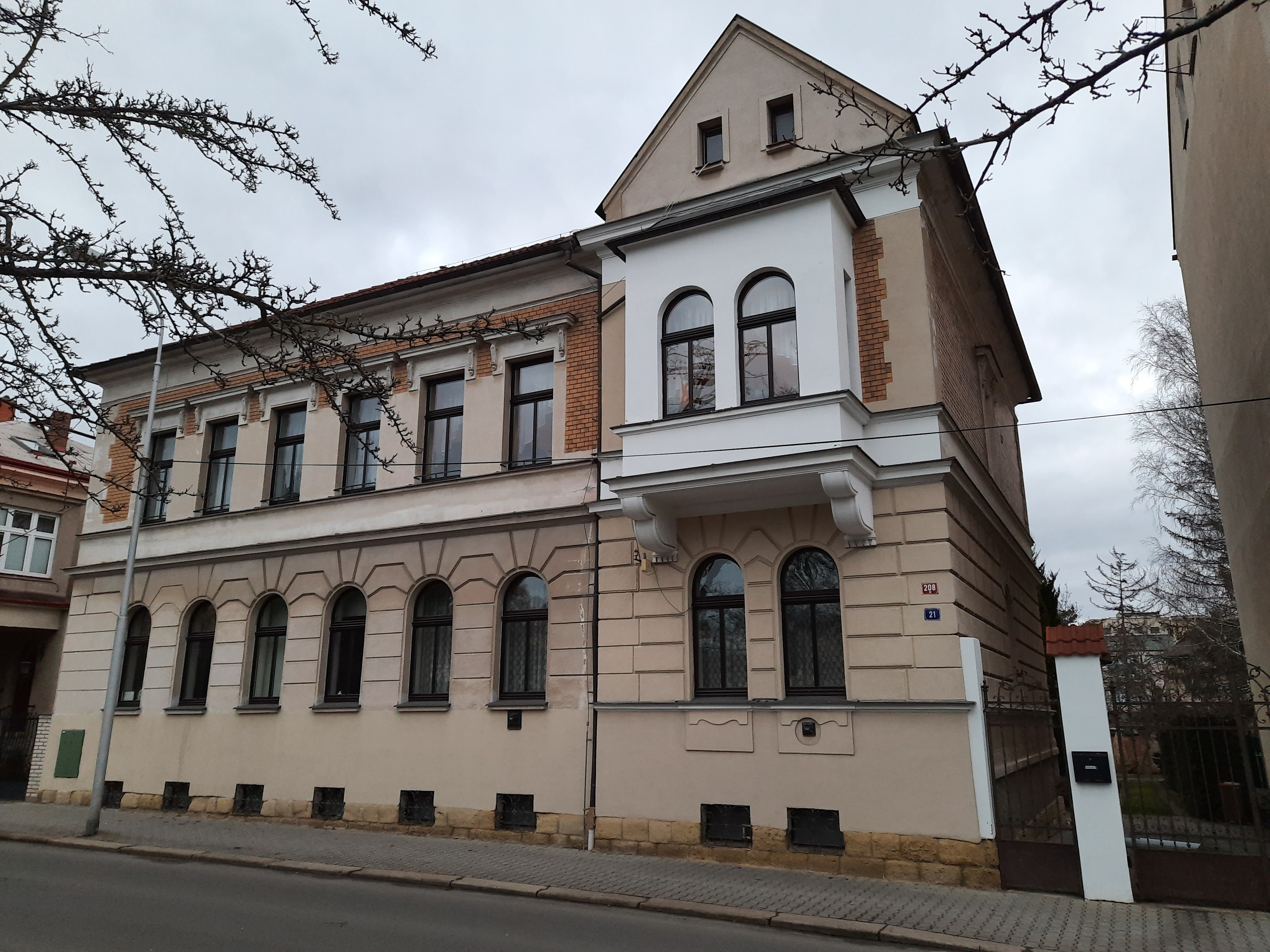
Laurin's villa in Mladá Boleslav
