= Škoda Auto University =

Private university in Mladá Boleslav, Czech Republic

Coordinates: 50°24′56.19″N 14°54′8.933″E

ŠKODA AUTO University
- ŠKODA AUTO Vysoká škola
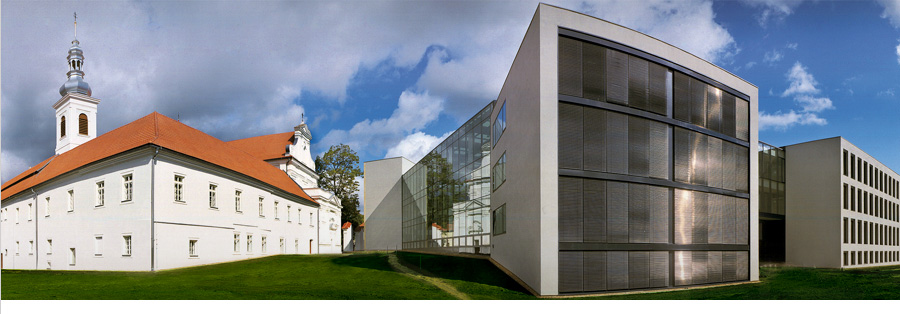
- Motto: Study & Work
- Type: Private
- Established: 2000
- Rector: prof. Ing. Ondřej Krejcar, Ph.D., MPA
- Students: 1134
- Location: Na Karmeli 1457, 293 01 Mladá Boleslav, Czech Republic, Europe
- Website: savs.cz
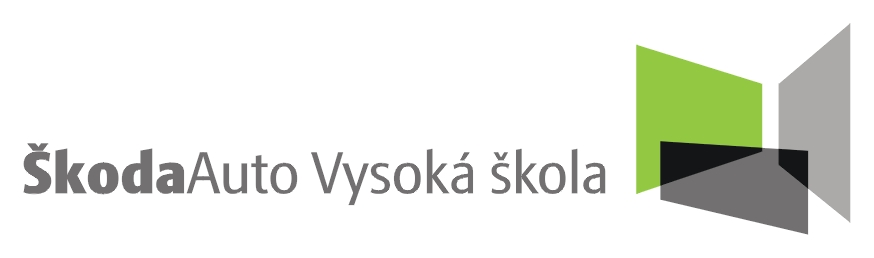

ŠKODA AUTO University (Czech: ŠKODA AUTO Vysoká škola, abbreviated ŠAVŠ) is a private university, located in Mladá Boleslav, Czech Republic. The ŠKODA AUTO University was founded in 2000. It was established by automobile manufacturer Škoda Auto and it is the only education institution in the Czech Republic that was founded by a large multinational company. It provides Bachelor and Master studies as full-time or part-time study. ŠKODA AUTO University has been involved into the European Union project Erasmus since 2005.

== Location ==
University is located 50 kilometres from Prague, in Mladá Boleslav. It is situated in the historical centre of the town.

== University today ==
More than one thousand students study at Škoda Auto University at the present time.

Number of students on 1 August 2019

- full-time study (900 students)
- part-time study (234 students)

== Courses ==
The university offers three bachelor study programs and four masters programs in Czech and English.

Bachelor study programs:

- Sales Management
- Logistics and Quality Management
- Financial Management
- Human Resources Management
- Industrial Management
- Business Informatics

Master study programs:

- International Marketing
- International Supply Chain Management
- Finance in International Business
- Law in the Global Business Environment
- Business Informatics
- Industrial Management

== Studying in Prague ==
Starting from the academic year 2018/2019, lectures are taking place in new premises of ŠKODA AUTO University at Ekonomická 957, Prague 4 (the building of VŠE). The university offers full-time study of all follow-on Master's programmes and selected Bachelor's programmes (only in Czech; programmes in English are taught in Mladá Boleslav).

Bachelor's degree programmes:

- Human Resources Management
- Financial Management

Follow-on master's degree programmes:

- Law in the Global Business Environment
- Finance in International Business
- International Marketing
- International Supply Chain Management
