= Laurin & Klement =

Defunct Bohemian bicycle, motorcycle and automobile manufacturer

- Type: Joint-stock company (from 1907)
- Industry: Automotive
- Founded: 1895
- Founder: Václav Laurin; Václav Klement
- Defunct: 1925
- Fate: Merged into Škoda Works
- Successor: Škoda Auto
- Headquarters: Mladá Boleslav
- Products: Bicycles; Motorcycles; Automobiles; Commercial vehicles; Agricultural machinery

Laurin & Klement was a Czech automobile, motorcycle and bicycle manufacturing company founded in 1895 in Mladá Boleslav, Kingdom of Bohemia, by automotive pioneers Václav Laurin and Václav Klement. It began making motorcycles in 1899 and cars in 1905, becoming Austria-Hungary’s largest automobile manufacturer before the First World War.

It was acquired by industrial conglomerate Škoda Works in 1925. Its Mladá Boleslav factory became the basis of what is now Škoda Auto.

== Bicycles and motorcycles ==
Mechanic Václav Laurin and bookseller Václav Klement established a bicycle repair and manufacturing workshop in Mladá Boleslav in 1895. Laurin had previously been a partner in a bicycle-manufacturing business in Turnov. Their bicycles were sold under the Slavia name, and the growing business moved into a newly built factory in 1898.

In autumn 1898, Klement brought a Werner motorised bicycle back from Paris. Its engine was mounted above the front wheel. Laurin & Klement used the machine as a starting point for their own motorcycle development, placing the engine within the frame. In 1899, they corresponded with Robert Bosch about magneto ignition and bought one of his apparatuses for testing. Bosch helped them with drawings and advice on installation. However, he would not reduce the cost or the weight of the apparatus. Laurin & Klement then developed their own ignition system based on the same principle.

Their first motorcycles, the Slavia A and B, in Prague in November 1899. Both had the engine mounted low in the frame, where it was better protected and lowered the motorcycle’s centre of gravity. In 1900, Klement secured an order for 150 motorcycles from the London dealer Henry Hewetson.

International competitions helped establish the motorcycles’ reputation. In 1901, Narcis Podsedníček represented the company in the Paris–Berlin race. On 25 June 1905, Václav Vondřich won the Coupe Internationale des Motocyclettes at Dourdan in France on a twin-cylinder Laurin & Klement CCR. The event was regarded as an unofficial motorcycle world championship.

Laurin & Klement made motorcycles with one, two or four cylinders. The CCCC was one of the earliest to use an inline four-cylinder engine. Motorcycle production ended in 1910; by then, the company had been building cars for five years.

== Expansion into automobiles ==
Bicycle production ended in 1905, the year Laurin & Klement introduced the Voiturette A. This was the company’s first production car, with seats for two and a two-cylinder petrol engine rated at 7 hp. Its top speed was about 40 km/h. At least 44 were built by 1907.

Laurin & Klement became a joint-stock company in 1907, by which time it was making passenger cars, buses, commercial vehicles and racing cars. That year it also built two examples of the Type FF, an early car with a straight-eight engine.

The Type S first appeared at the Prague Motor Show in April 1911. Sales made it the company’s most popular model at the time. Later versions had larger engines and longer chassis, and buyers could choose open or enclosed passenger bodies or light commercial versions. More than 2,000 examples had been built by 1924. The company also expanded into agricultural machinery, producing Excelsior motor ploughs in cooperation with Rudolf Bächer, a manufacturer of agricultural equipment based in Roudnice nad Labem.

In 1912, Laurin & Klement bought the Liberec luxury-car manufacturer Reichenberger Automobil Fabrik (RAF). From 1913, it offered RAF’s car under its own name as the RK, short for “RAF–Knight”.

Before the First World War, Laurin & Klement was Austria-Hungary’s largest carmaker. Its export business extended beyond Europe, with cars sold in Japan and New Zealand as well as Russia.

== Post-war merger with Škoda ==
During the First World War, the factory built ambulances and cars for officers, as well as ammunition. After the war, Laurin & Klement lost established export markets with the break-up of Austria-Hungary. At home, it faced growing competition from Praga and Tatra.

After the war, Laurin & Klement kept building cars from the M and S ranges and offered larger luxury cars with Knight engines. With fewer buyers for cars, sales of Excelsior motor ploughs helped sustain the business.

A fire damaged the factory in 1924. With the business already struggling, Laurin and Klement looked for a partner and in 1925 merged their company with Škoda Works, the engineering and armaments group based in Plzeň. After the takeover, Škoda enlarged the factory and introduced assembly-line production.

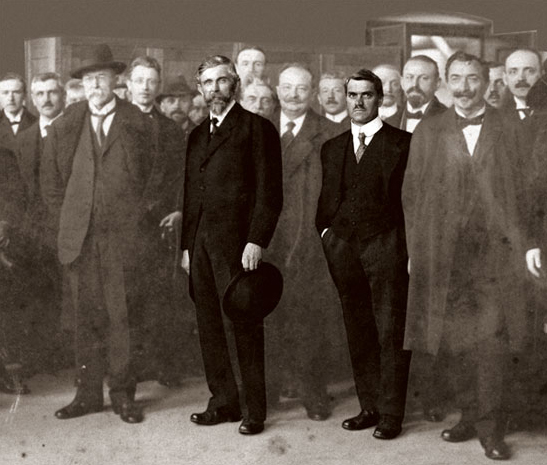
Founders Václav Klement (left) and Václav Laurin (right, both highlighted) next to the Czechoslovak president Tomáš Masaryk

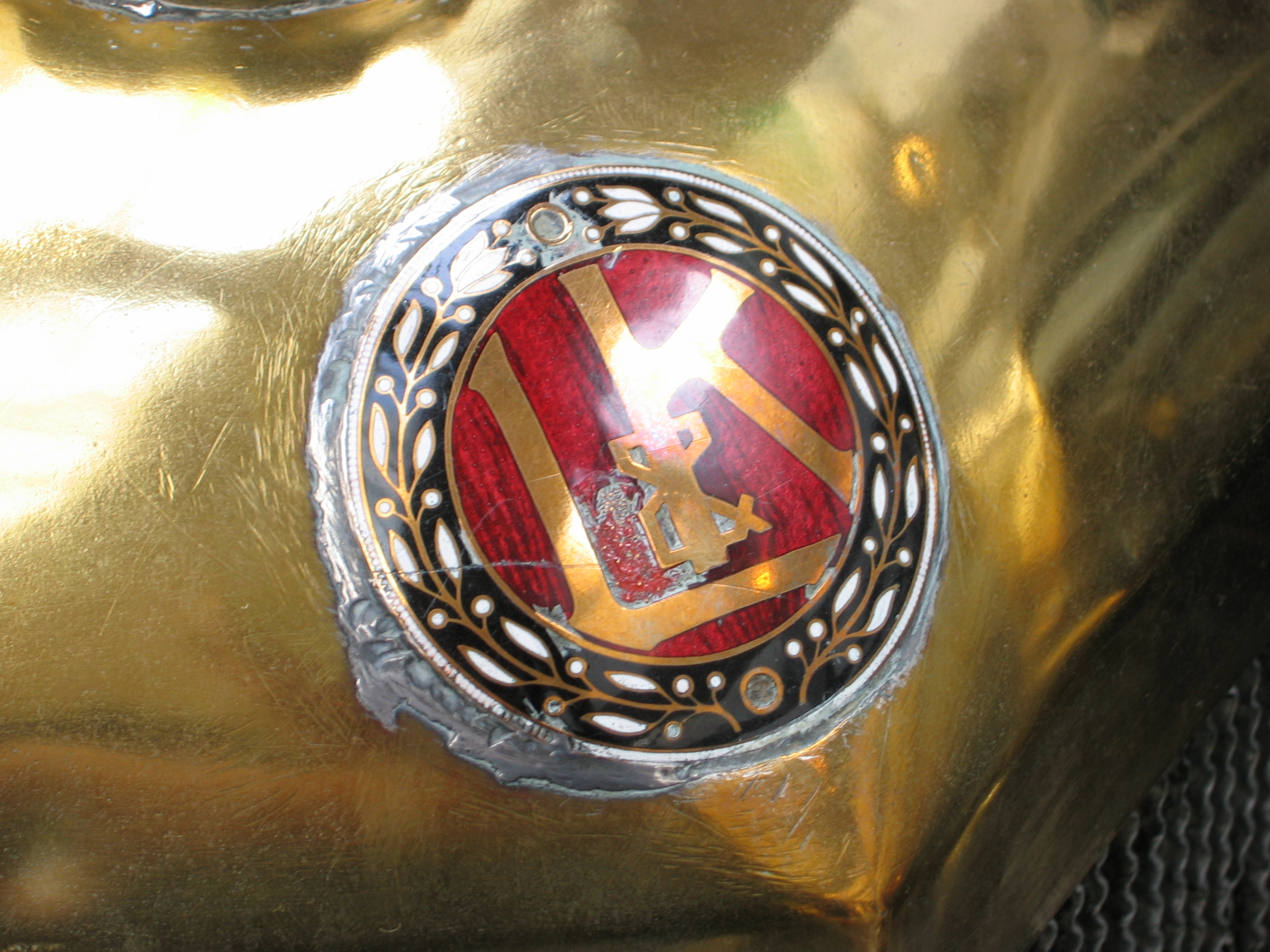
Laurin & Klement logo

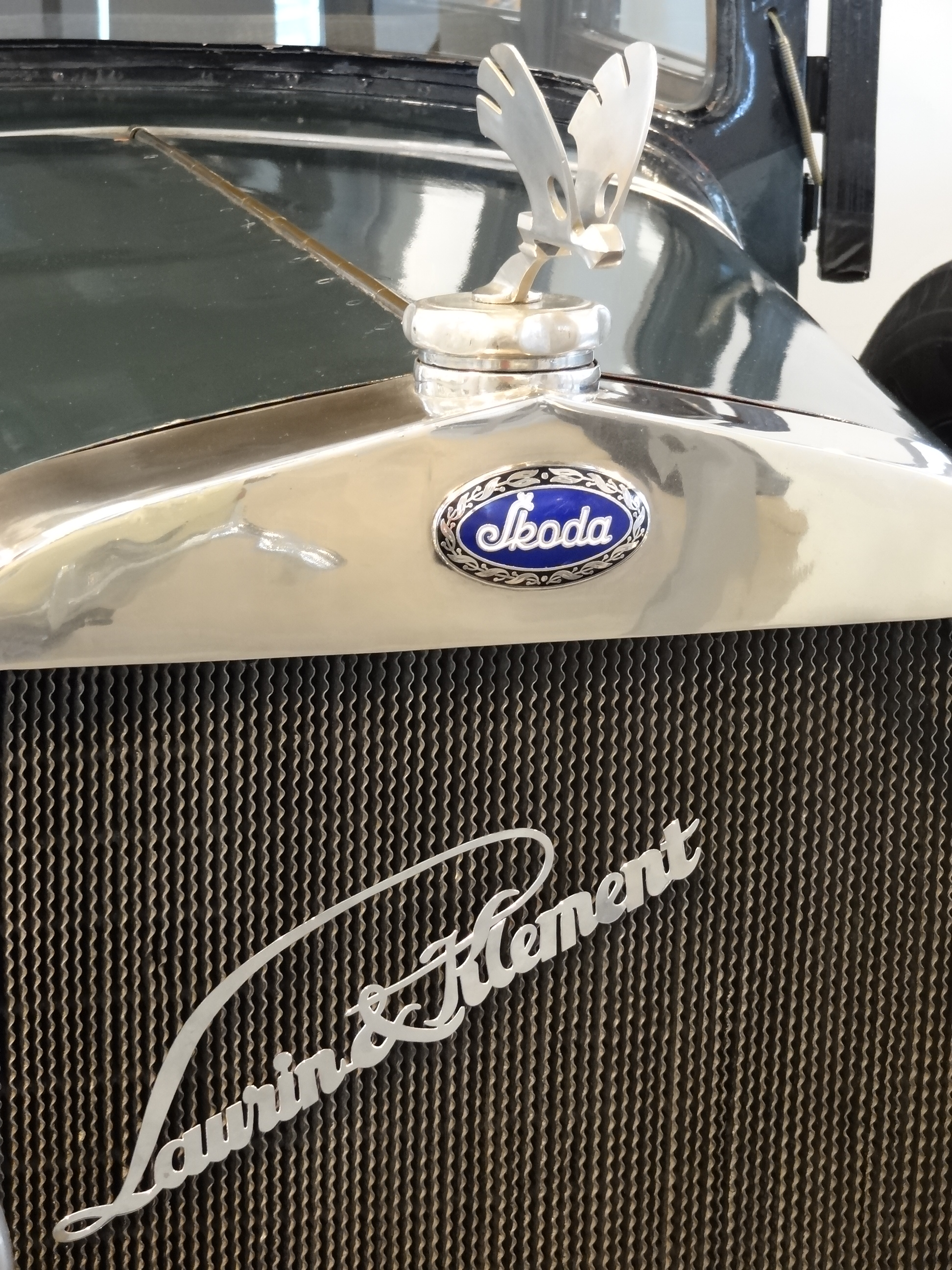
Škoda and Laurin & Klement hood ornament and plaques

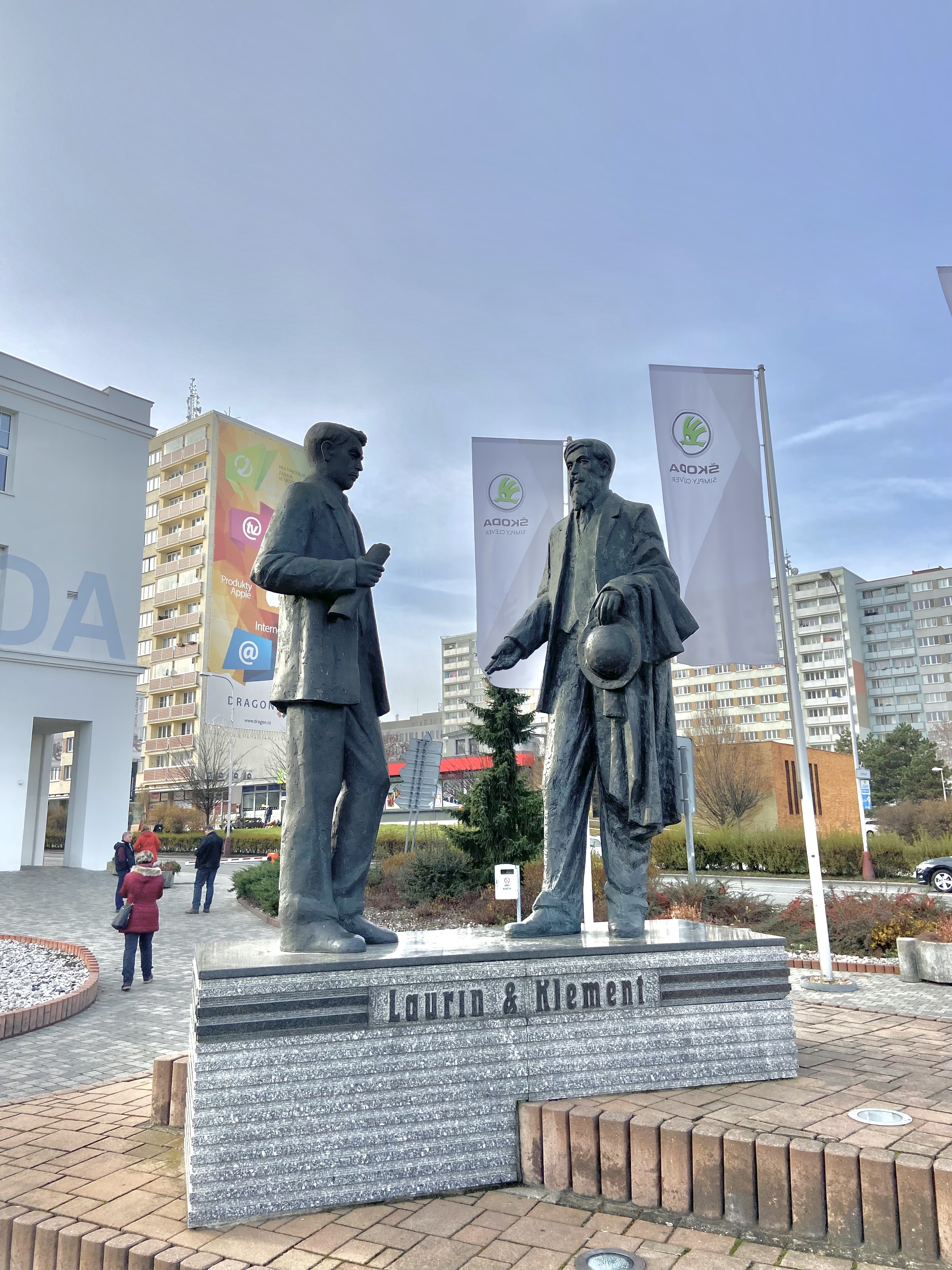
Statue of Laurin & Klement at the Škoda Museum

== Models ==
- Laurin & Klement A (1905)
- Laurin & Klement B (1906)
- Laurin & Klement C (1906)
- Laurin & Klement E (1906)
- Laurin & Klement B2 (1907)
- Laurin & Klement C2 (1907)
- Laurin & Klement FC (1907) (racing car)
- Laurin & Klement FCS (1908) (racing car)
- Laurin & Klement BS (1908)
- Laurin & Klement EN (1909)
- Laurin & Klement FCR (1909) (racing car)
- Laurin & Klement ENS (1910)
- Laurin & Klement T / Ta (1914)
- Laurin & Klement MK6 (Laurin & Klement MK6 / 445 / 450) (1920)
- Laurin & Klement A (1922) (Laurin & Klement A / 100) (1922)
- Laurin & Klement 105 (1923)
- Laurin & Klement 150 (1923)
- Laurin & Klement 350 (1925)
- Laurin & Klement 110 (1925)
- Laurin & Klement 120 (1925)
- Škoda 360 (Laurin & Klement 360) (1926)
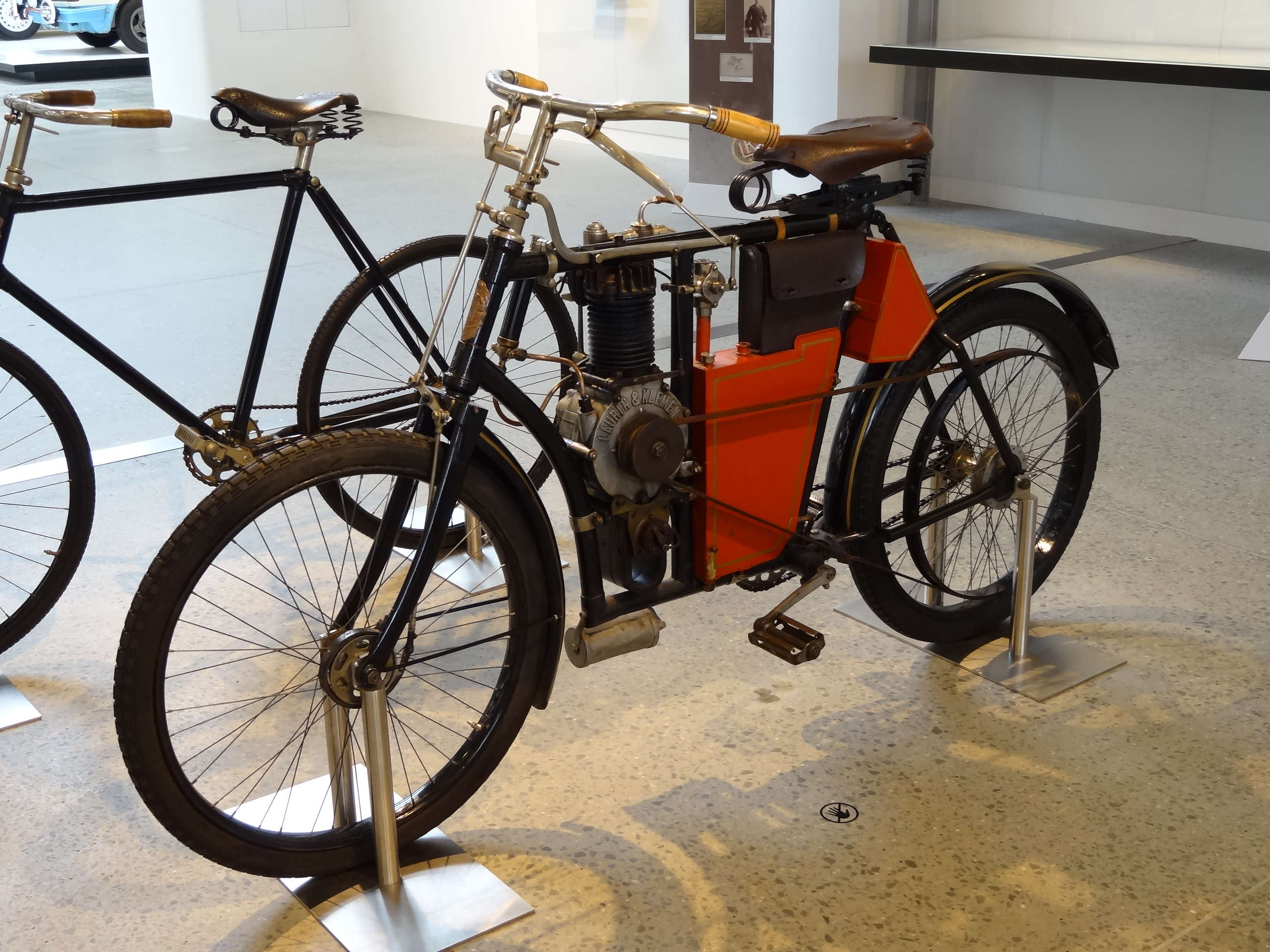
Laurin & Klement Typ 1 motorcycle (1903)

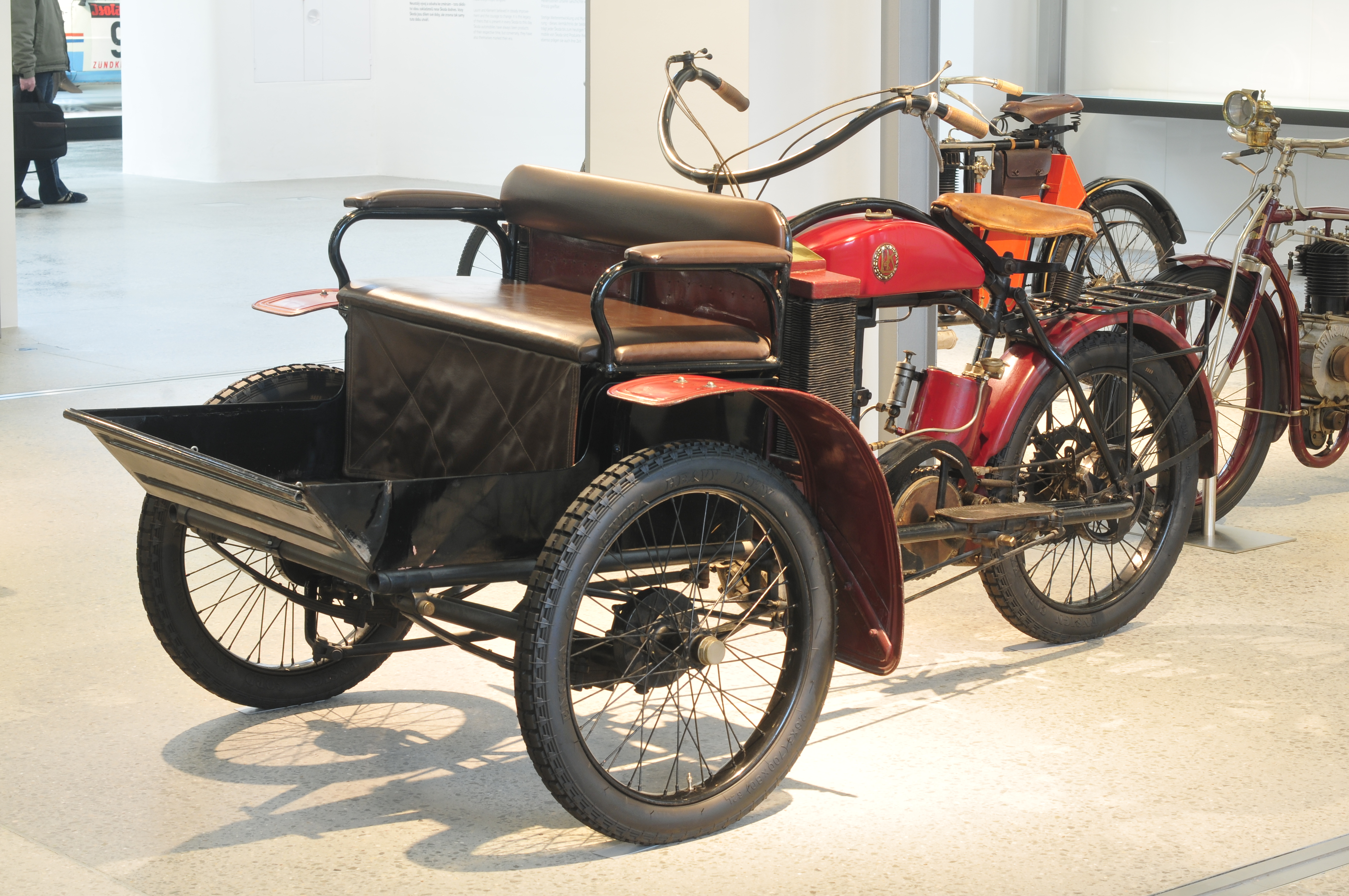
Laurin & Klement tricycle

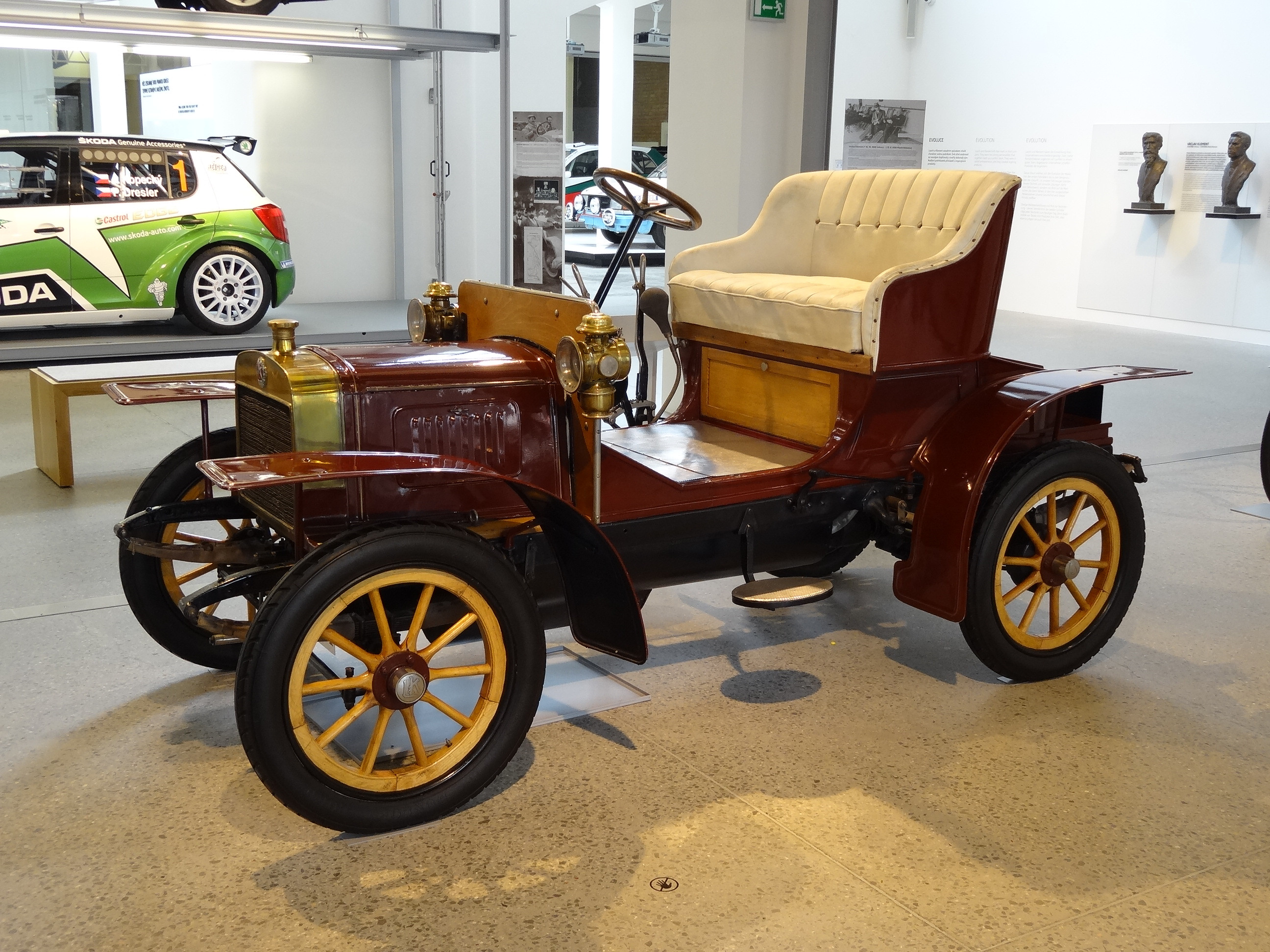
Laurint & Klement Typ A (1906)

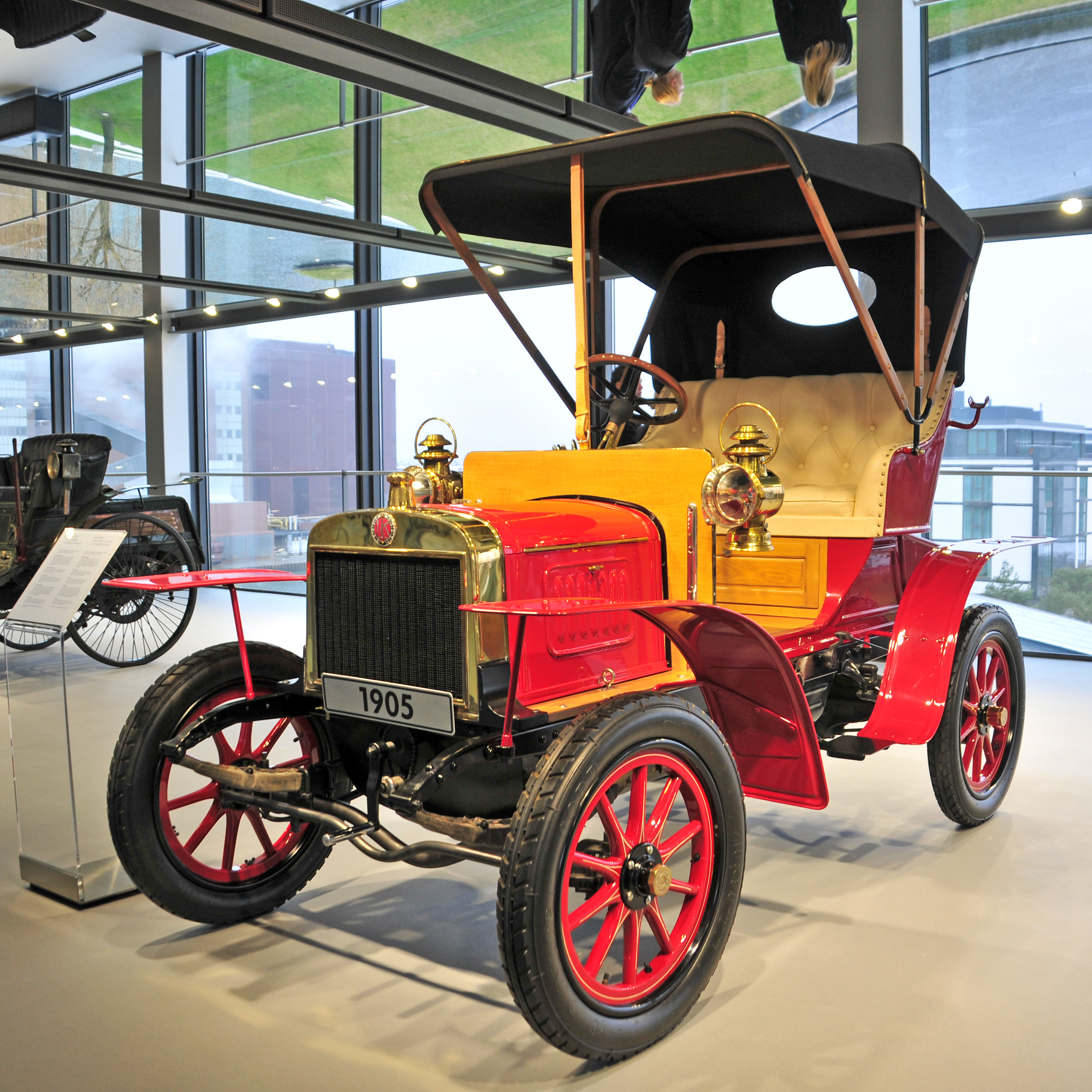
Laurin & Klement Typ A

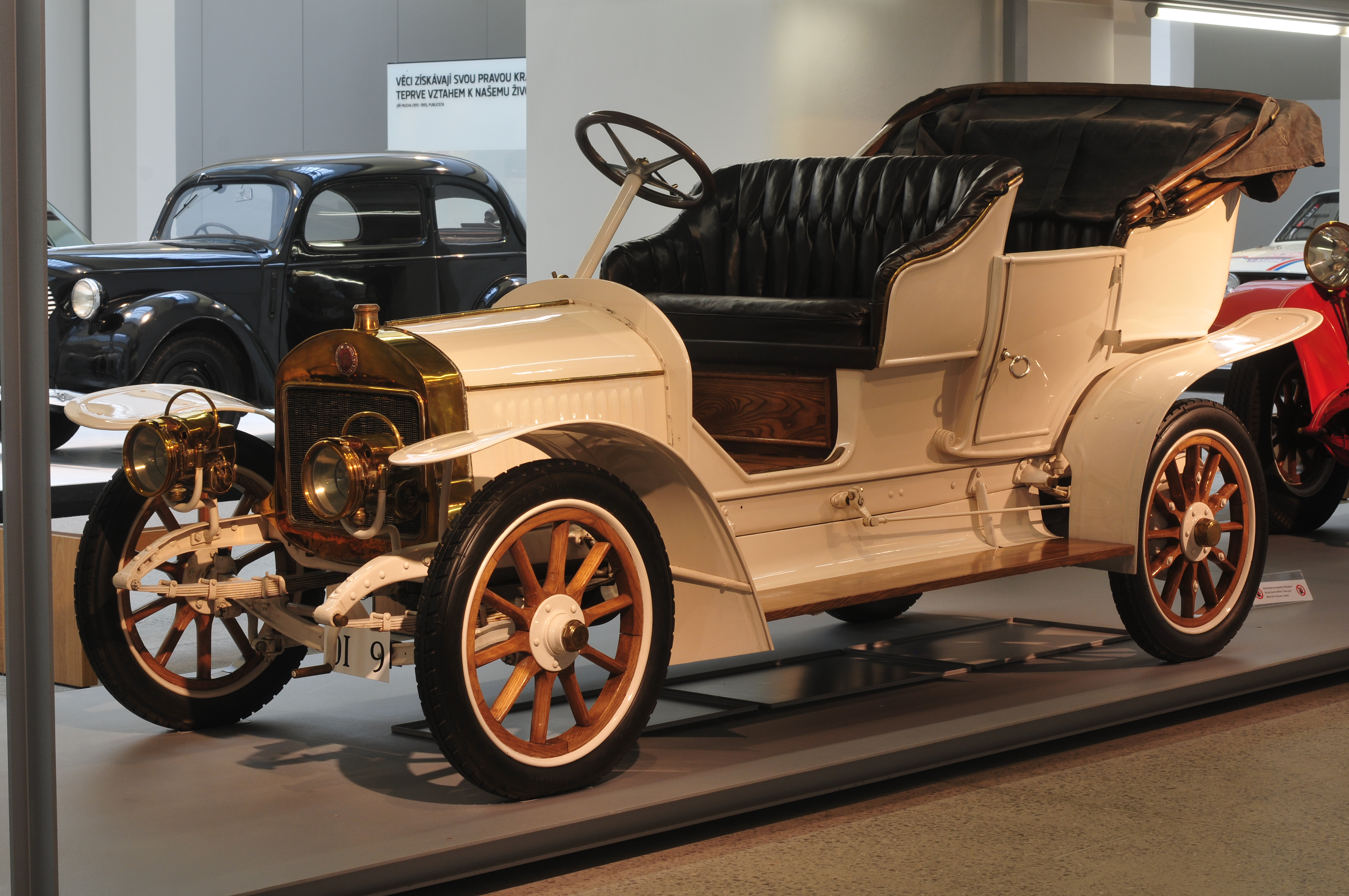
Laurin & Klement S

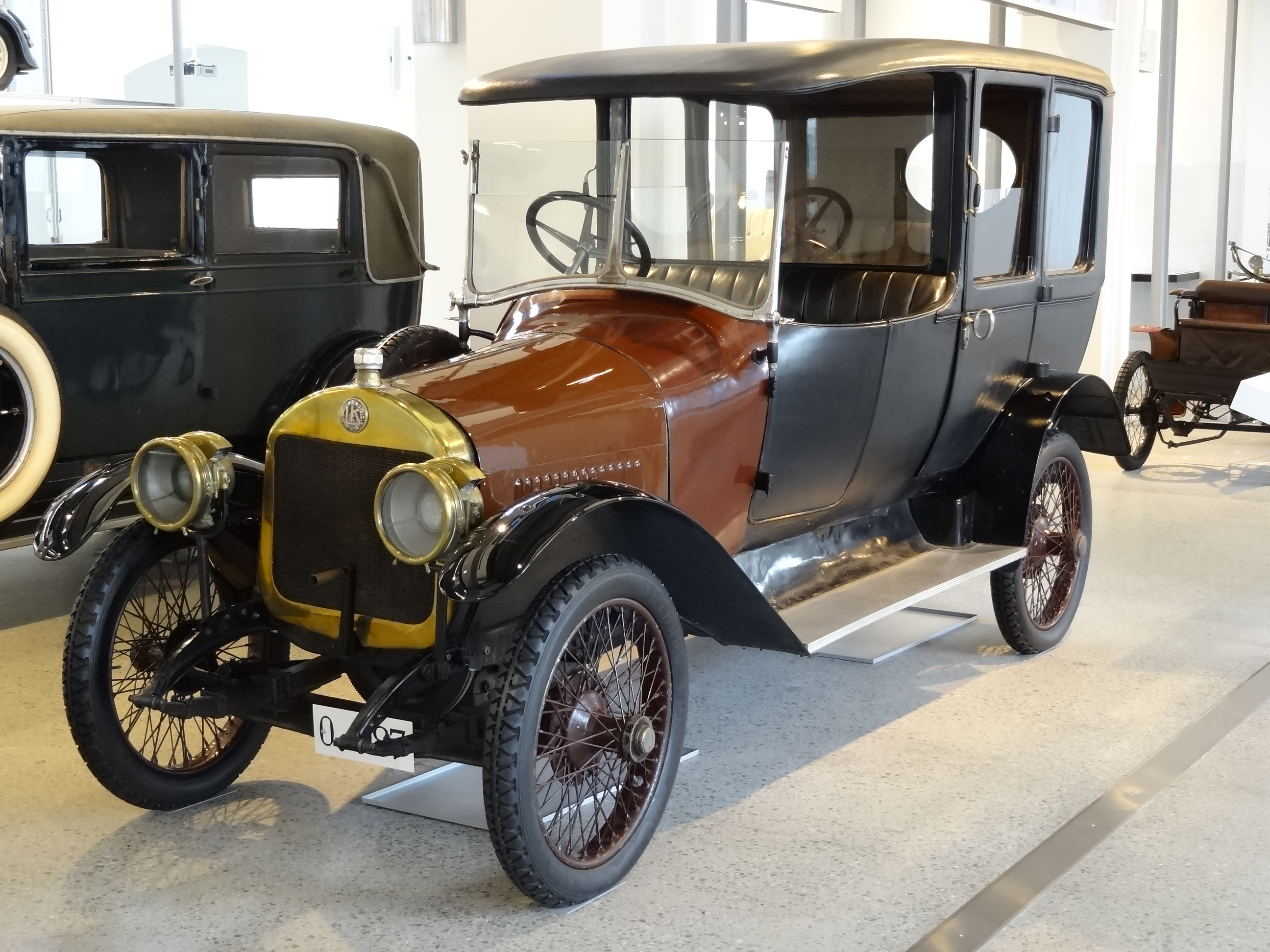
Laurin & Klement S

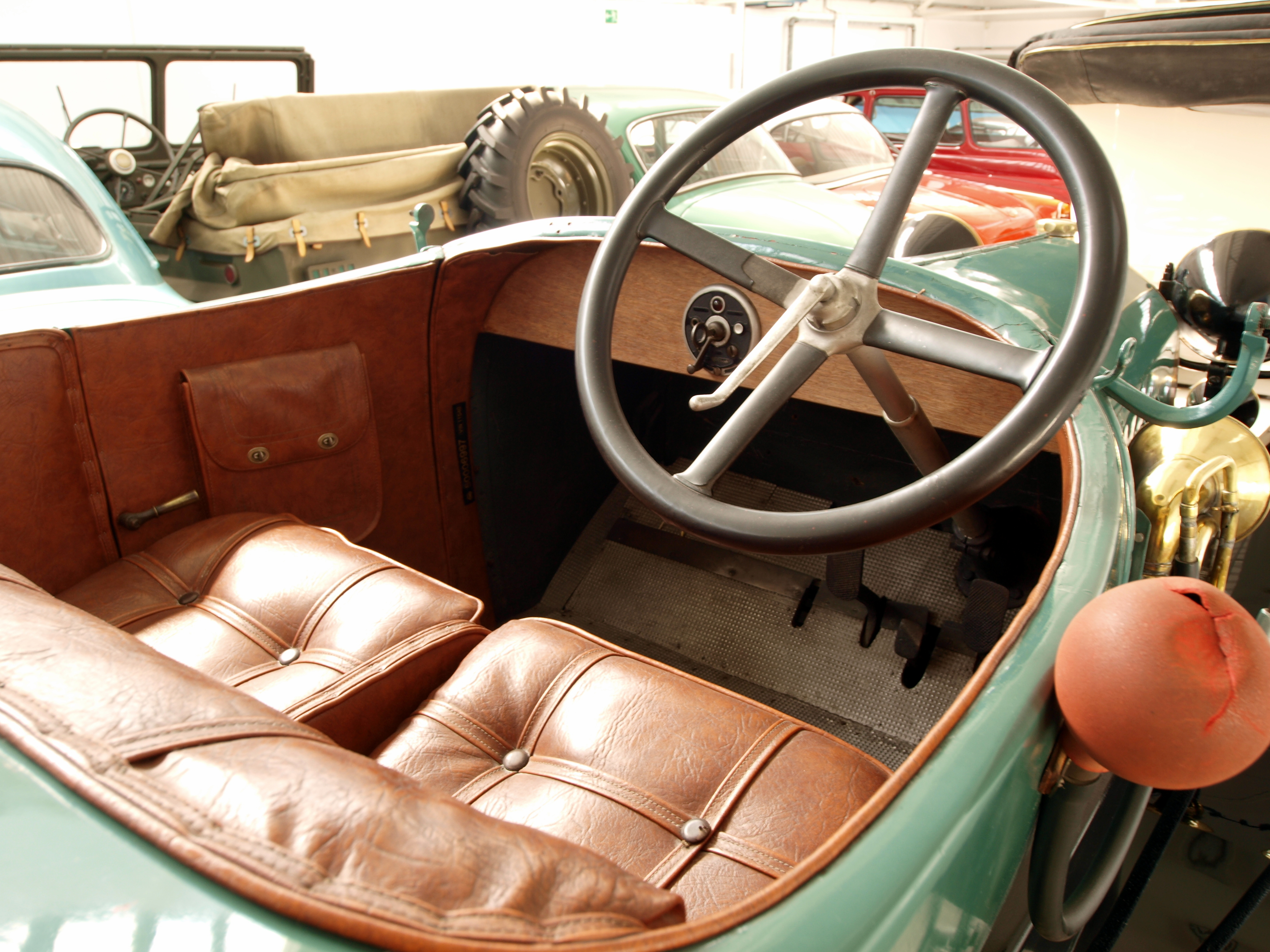
Laurin & Klement S

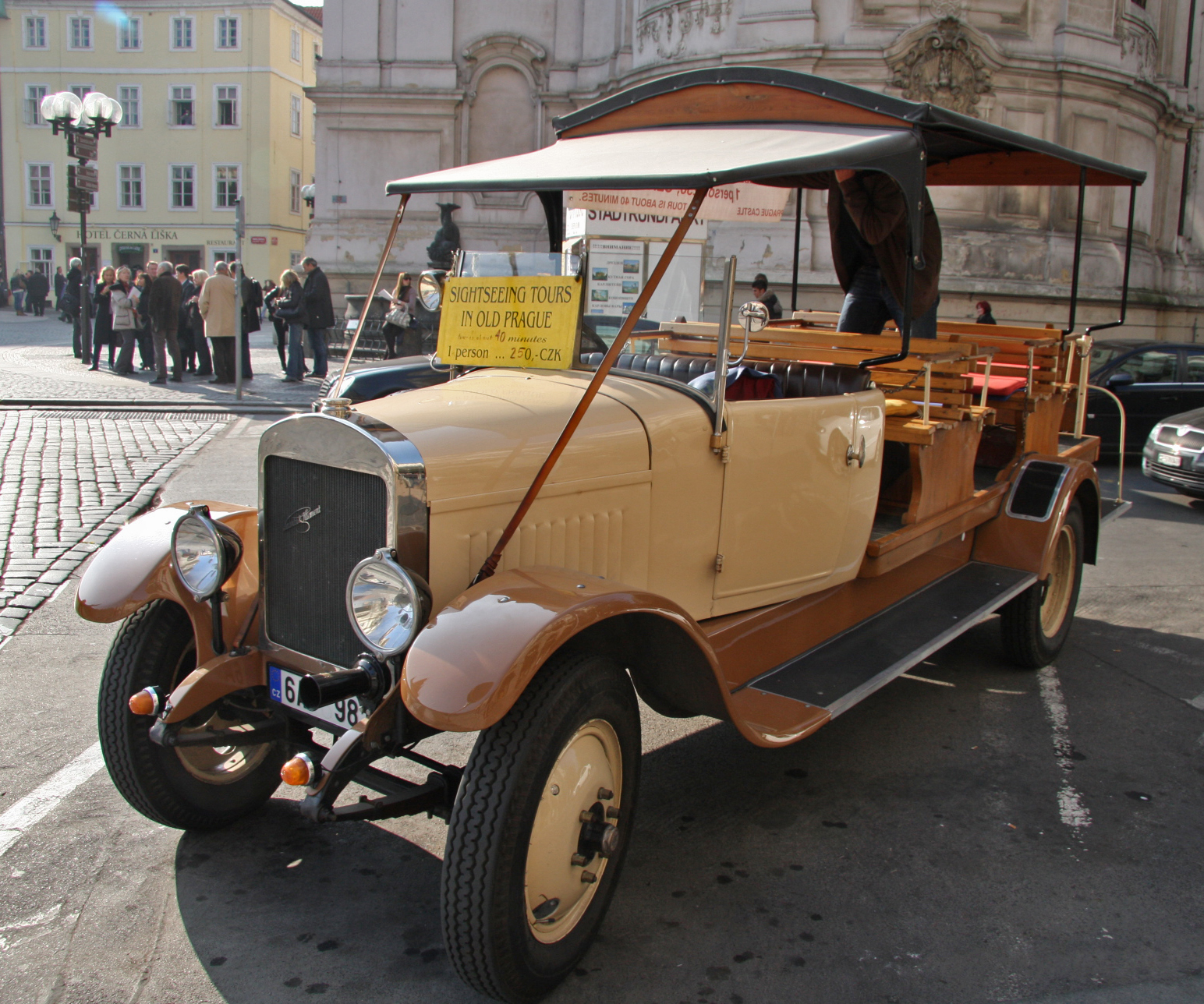
Laurin & Klement bus

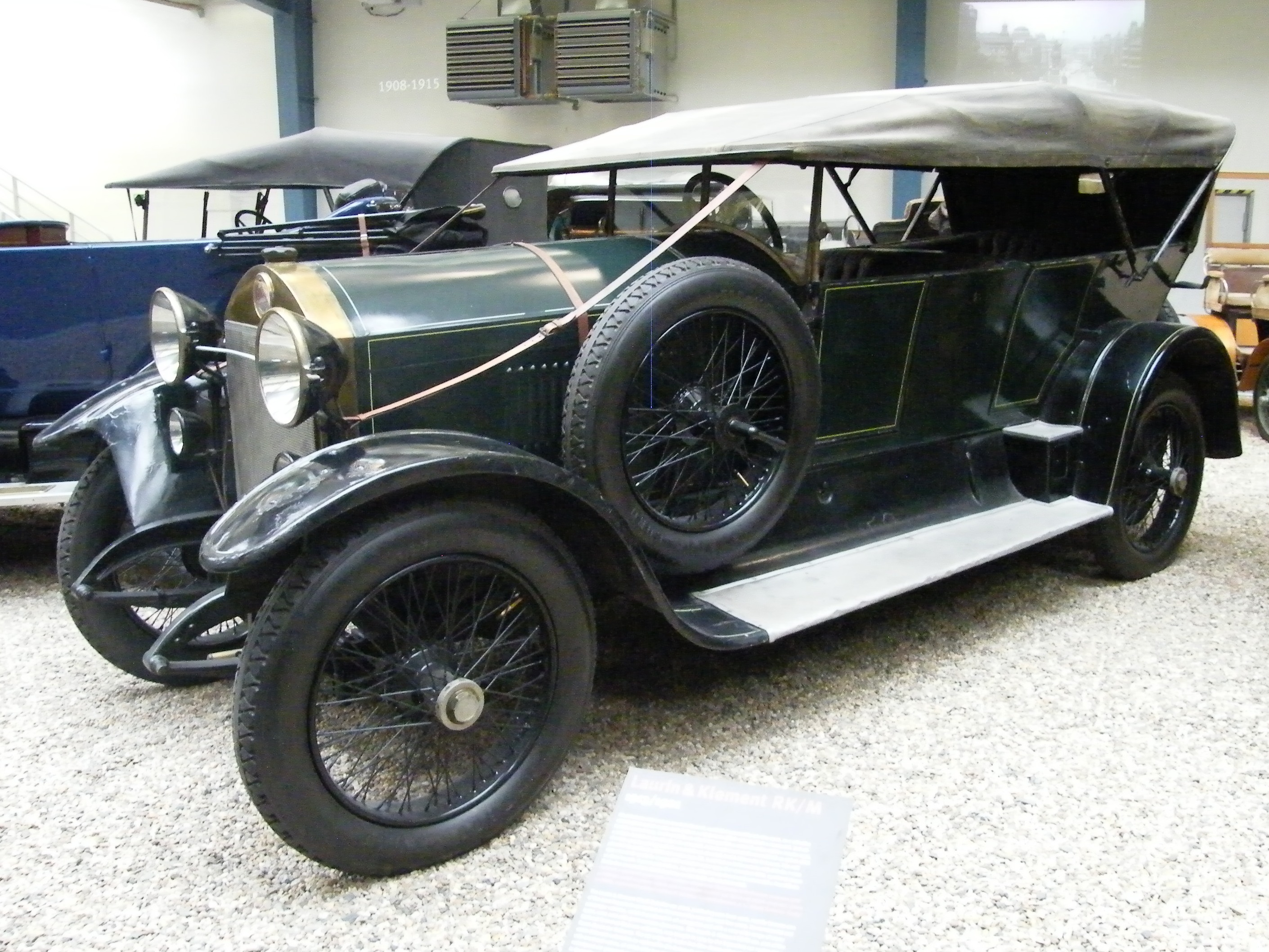
Laurin & Klement RK-M

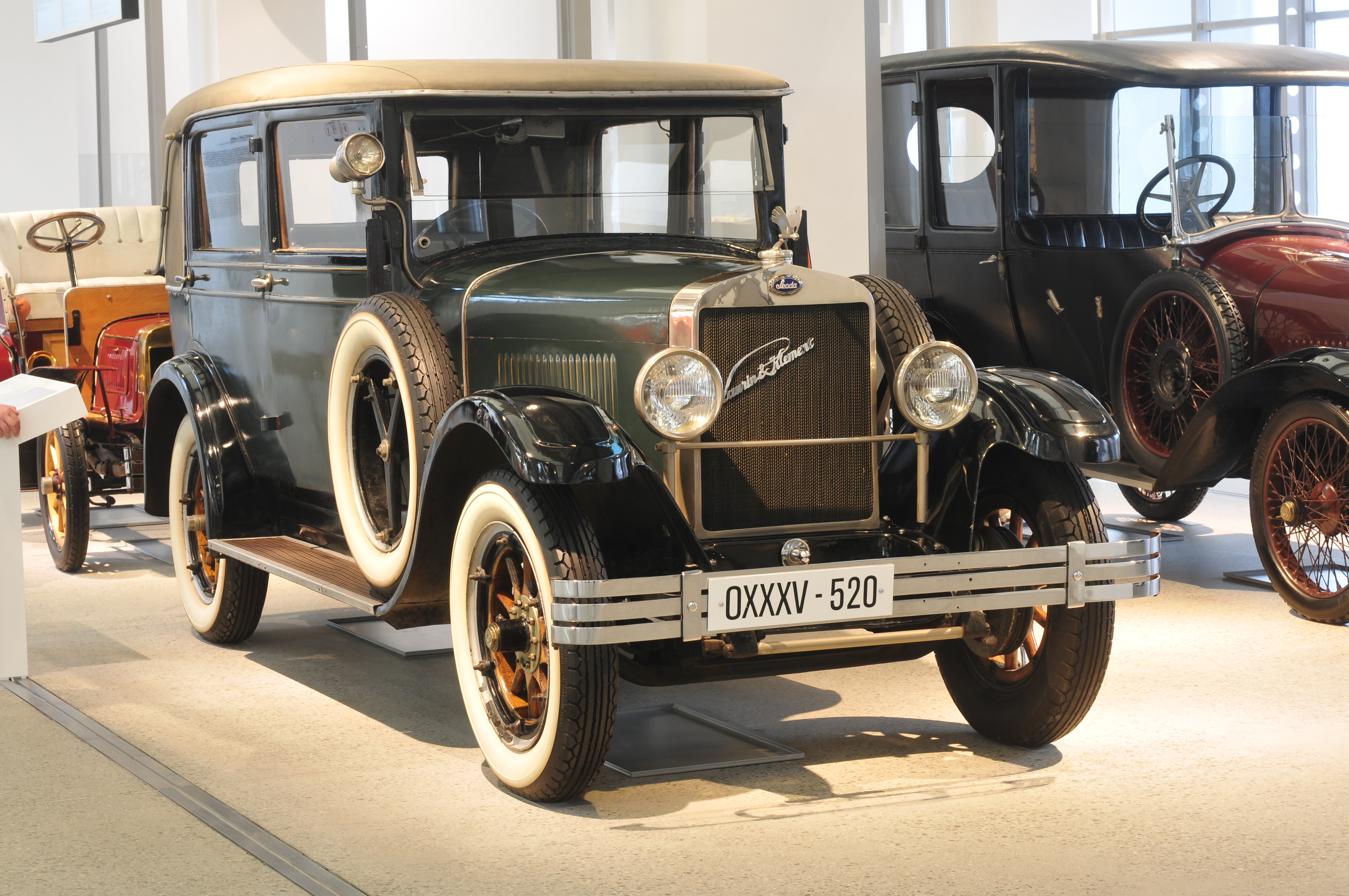
Laurin & Klement Škoda 110

== See also ==
- List of motorcycles of 1900 to 1909
