= Mladá Boleslav =

City in Central Bohemian Region, Czech Republic

- Statutory city
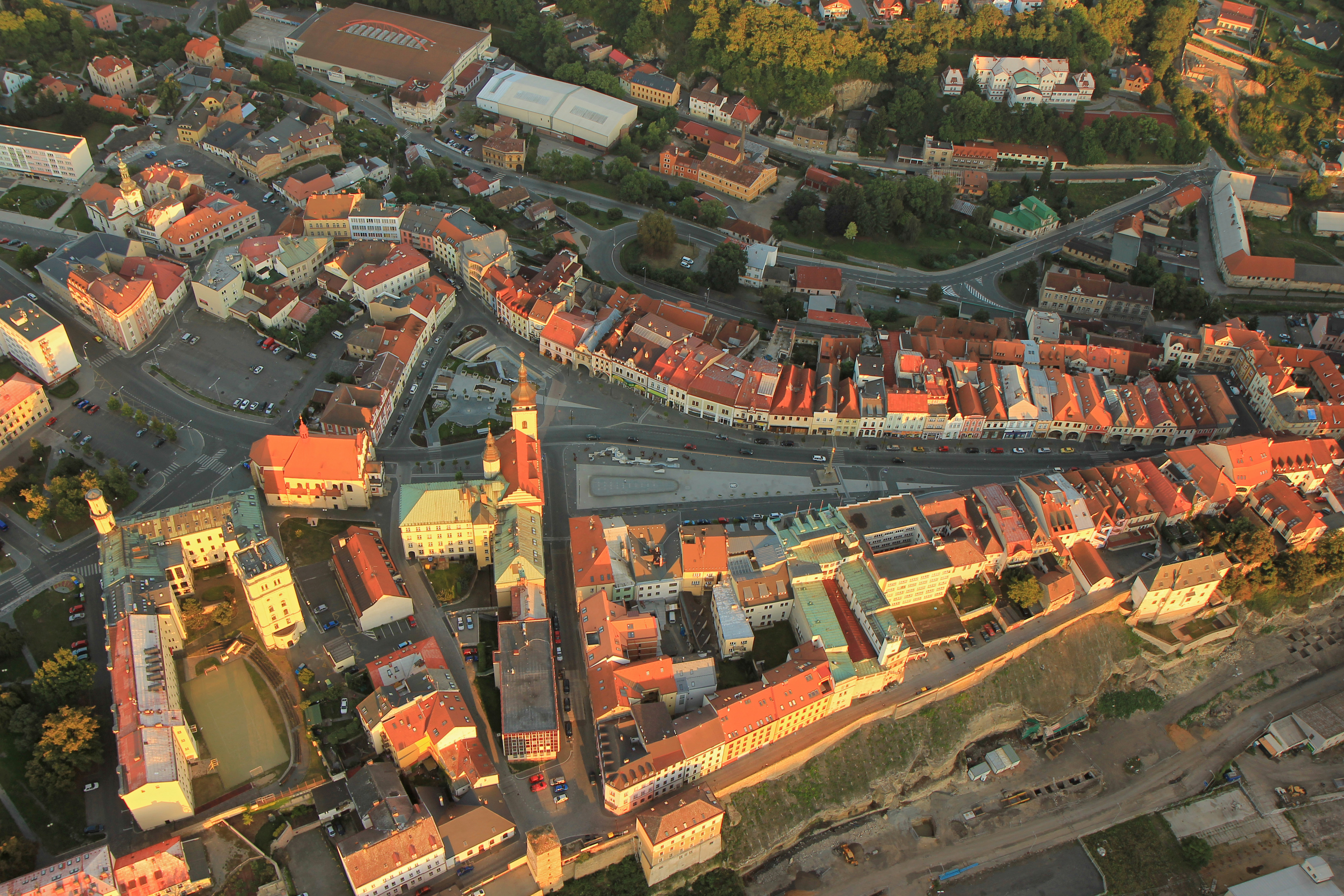
- Aerial view of the historic centre

- Flag Coat of arms

- Location in the Czech Republic
- Coordinates: 50°24′45″N 14°54′16″E
- Country: Czech Republic
- Region: Central Bohemian
- District: Mladá Boleslav
- First mentioned: 1130

Government
  - Mayor: Jiří Bouška (ANO a Volba pro Mladou Boleslav)

Area
  - Total: 28.90 km^{2} (11.16 sq mi)
- Elevation: 235 m (771 ft)

Population (2026-01-01)
  - Total: 47,874
  - Density: 1,657/km^{2} (4,290/sq mi)
- Time zone: UTC+1 (CET)
  - Summer (DST): UTC+2 (CEST)
- Postal code: 293 01
- Website: www.mb-net.cz

Mladá Boleslav (Czech pronunciation: [ˈmladaː ˈbolɛslaf]; German: Jungbunzlau) is a city in the Central Bohemian Region of the Czech Republic. It has about 48,000 inhabitants. It lies on the left bank of the Jizera River.

Mladá Boleslav is the second most populated city in the region. It is a major centre of the Czech automotive industry thanks to the Škoda Auto company and therefore the centre of Czech industry as a whole. The city is also a centre of technical education, represented by Škoda Auto University and Secondary Industrial School.

Mladá Boleslav was named after Duke Boleslaus II, who founded a gord here. The historic city centre is well preserved and is protected as an urban monument zone. The main historic landmark of the city is the Mladá Boleslav Castle.

== Administrative division ==
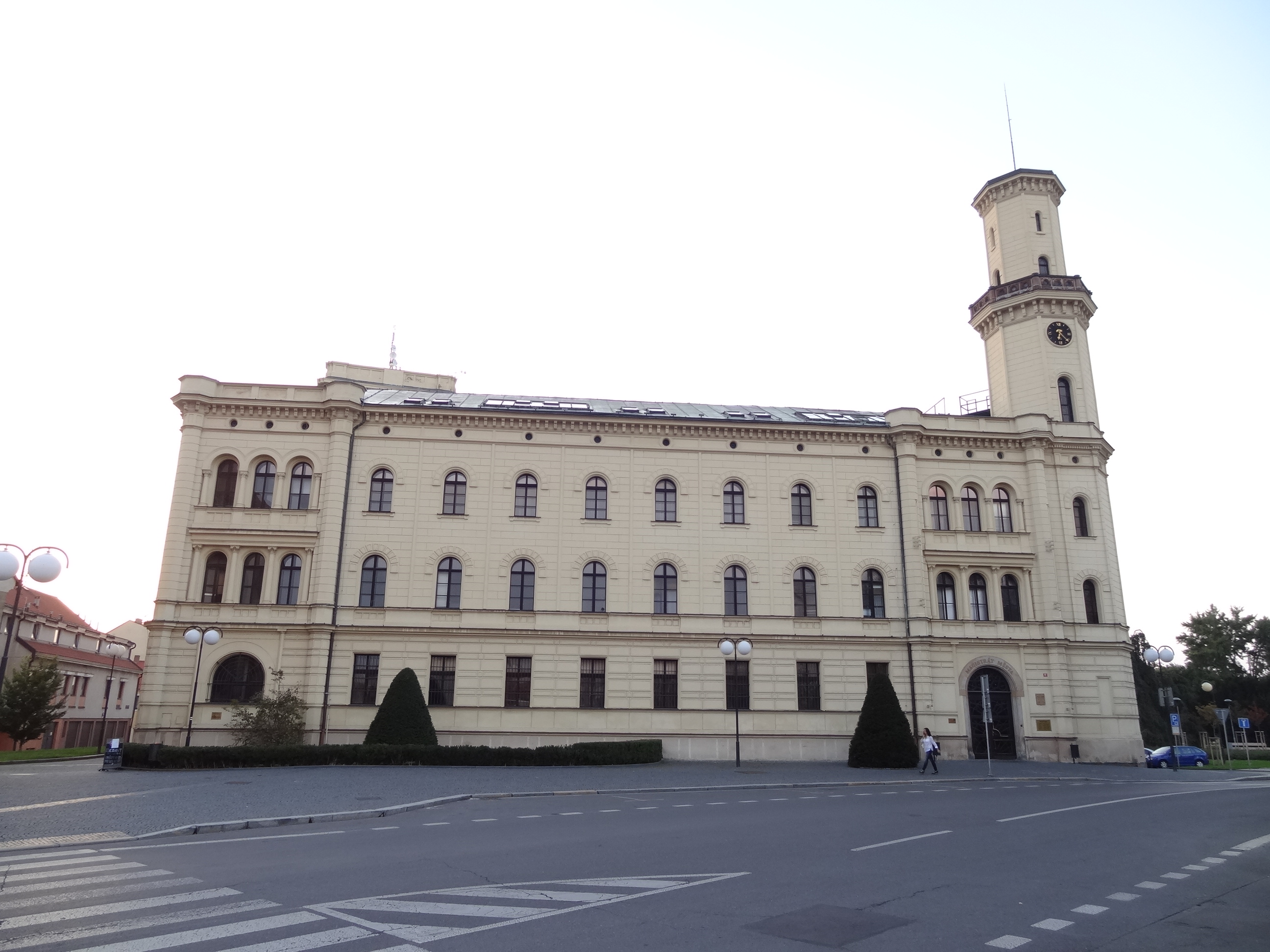
New city hall

Mladá Boleslav consists of 13 municipal parts (in brackets population according to the 2021 census):

- Mladá Boleslav I (1,237)
- Mladá Boleslav II (26,057)
- Mladá Boleslav III (9,409)
- Mladá Boleslav IV (857)
- Bezděčín (356)
- Čejetice (1,145)
- Čejetičky (1,094)
- Chrást (260)
- Debř (912)
- Jemníky (187)
- Michalovice (514)
- Podchlumí (124)
- Podlázky (384)

The core municipal parts Mladá Boleslav I–IV are often referred to by their historical names: Staré Město ("Old Town"), Nové Město ("New Town"), Podolec and Pták.

== Etymology ==
Mladá Boleslav was named after its founder, Duke Boleslaus II, who was called "the Young One", to distinguish him from his father. Because there was already a town known as Boleslav near Prague, this new town was called "Město Boleslava Mladého" ('the town of Boleslav the Young'), later abbreviated to Mladá Boleslav ('young Boleslav'), to distinguish it from the older town of Boleslav, which in the 15th century became known as Stará Boleslav ('old Boleslav').

== Geography ==
Mladá Boleslav is located about 45 kilometres (28 mi) northeast of Prague. The eastern part of the municipal territory lies in the Jičín Uplands and the western part lies in the Jizera Table. The highest point is located on the slopes of the Chlum hill at 301 m (988 ft) above sea level. The city is situated on the left bank of the Jizera River, at its confluence with the Klenice River. The historic city centre is situated on a promontory above the confluence.

== History ==
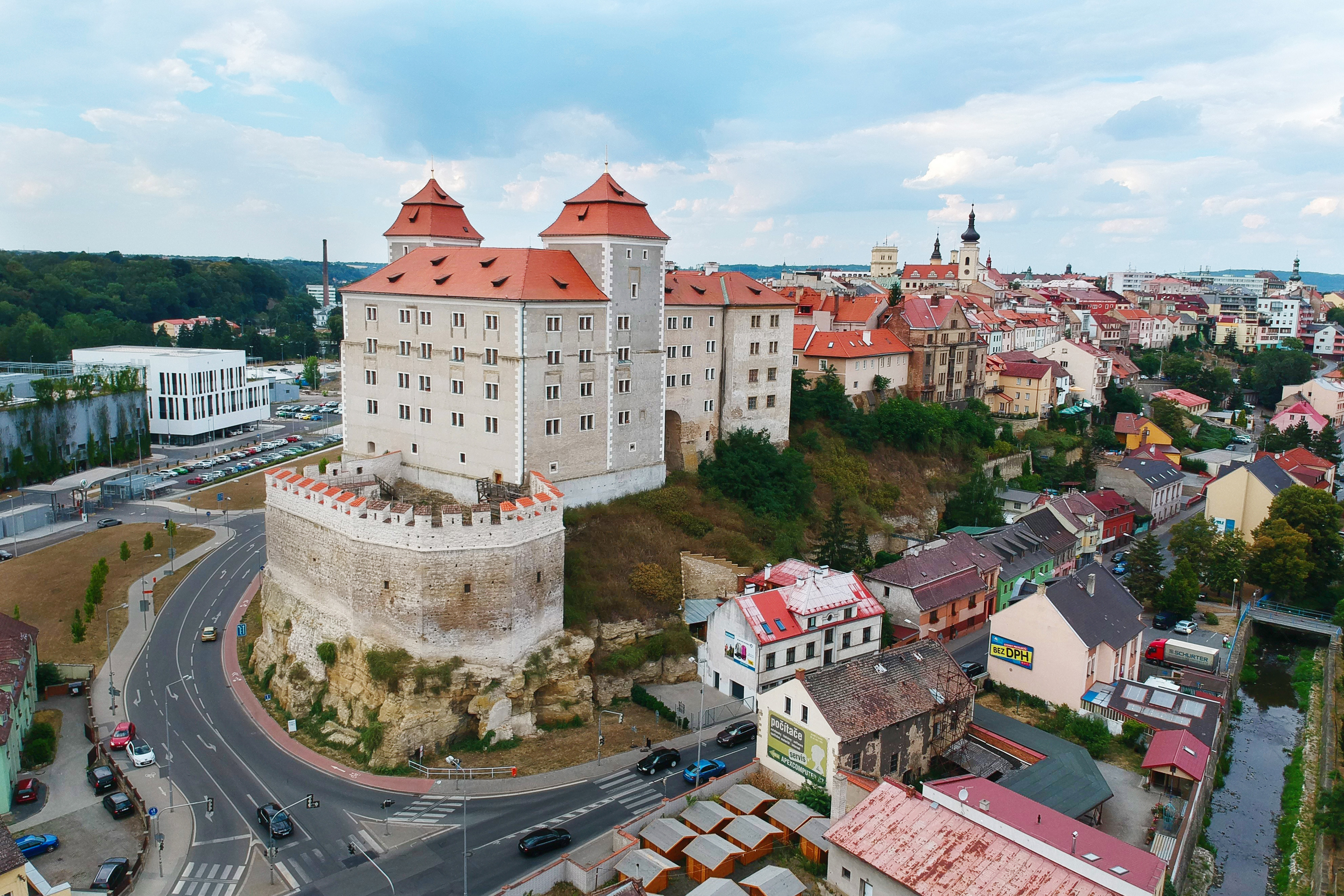
Mladá Boleslav Castle

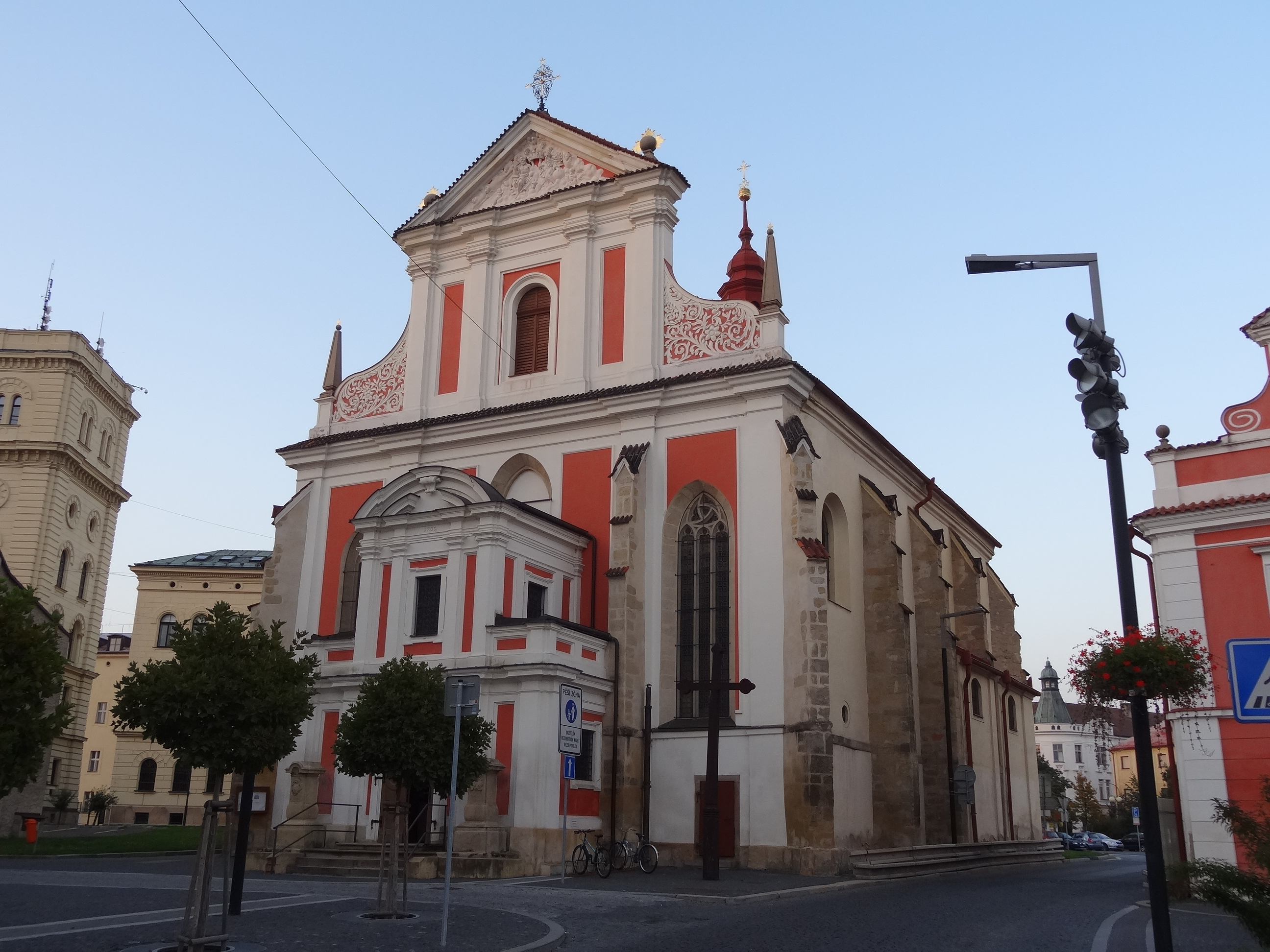
Church of the Assumption of the Virgin Mary

=== Early history ===
In the second half of the 10th century, a gord was founded by Duke Boleslaus II on the promontory above the confluence of the Jizera and Klenice rivers, in the area of today's historic centre. The first trustworthy written mention of the gord is from 1130, when it was also called Nová Boleslav ("New Boleslav") for the first time. Probably in the 11th century, a settlement was founded below the promontory in an area called Podolec, on an important site on the road from Prague to northern Bohemia, Lusatia and Brandenburg.

During the 13th century, the settlement in Podolec grew, acquired an urban character and even some privileges of the town. A new stone royal castle was built on top of the promontory next to the gord in the middle of the 13th century and the gord was abandoned. In 1318, Lords of Michalovice acquired Mladá Boleslav from King John of Bohemia. In 1334, the market village was moved to the area in front of the castle and was promoted to a town. From that time on, the town was called Mladá Boleslav.

=== 15th–16th centuries ===
In the Hussite Wars, Mladá Boleslav adhered to the Taborites. In the mid-15th century, the town has about 2,000 inhabitants. Lords of Michalovice died out in 1468 and Mladá Boleslav was acquired by the Tovačovský of Cimburk family. Before the end of the 15th century, they left the desolated Minorite monastery to the Unity of the Brethren, which settled there and thus began the period of the town's greatest prosperity. At the beginning of the 16th century, Mladá Boleslav was inherited by the Krajíř of Krajek family. In the 16th century, Mladá Boleslav was a leading centre of the Unity of the Brethren, hosting the Brethren's bishop, a Renaissance church and a printing house. In 1518, the first map of Bohemia was printed by Mikuláš Klaudyán in Mladá Boleslav.

After death of Adam Krajíř of Krajek in 1588, Mladá Boleslav became property of the Hasištejnský branch of the Lobkowicz family. They invited a large Lutheran community from Germany to the city and thus began the Germanization of the city. In 1595, Mladá Boleslav became a free city. In 1600, Mladá Boleslav was promoted to a royal city by Emperor Rudolf II.

=== 17th–20th centuries ===
At the beginning of the 17th century, Mladá Boleslav has about 3,100 inhabitants. During the Thirty Years' War in the first half of the 17th century, the city was twice burned, in 1631 by the imperialists, and in 1640 by the Swedish army. After the war, the city's population declined by 40% and the castle was in ruins. The castle remained unrestored for several decades and the city lost its former importance. Other disasters were the Silesian Wars and a large fire in 1761. A new stage of development and prosperity began only in 1784.

In the 19th century, new prosperity came: the city became an important regional centre as new schools, theatres, museums and factories (including the automobile factory Laurin & Klement, today Škoda Auto) were founded. Since the 1990s, the factory has made it one of the richest and most prosperous Czech cities.

=== Jewish community ===
The first written mention of the presence of Jewish community in Mladá Boleslav is from 1471. In 1634, Jacob Bassevi von Treuenberg, the first ennobled Jew in the Habsburg monarchy, was buried in the Jewish cemetery in Mladá Boleslav.

In the 17th and 18th centuries, Mladá Boleslav (called Bumsla by Jews) was an important Jewish centre.

The synagogue was demolished in 1962.

== Demographics ==
The population rapidly increased between 1960 and 1980 because of the rapid growth of production in the Škoda Auto factory and the construction of housing estates for its employees.

Historical population

Year	Pop.	±%
1869	11,003	—
1880	12,249	+11.3%
1890	14,452	+18.0%
1900	17,017	+17.7%
1910	20,640	+21.3%

Year	Pop.	±%
1921	21,425	+3.8%
1930	24,488	+14.3%
1950	23,204	−5.2%
1961	26,021	+12.1%
1970	31,085	+19.5%

Year	Pop.	±%
1980	41,226	+32.6%
1991	43,859	+6.4%
2001	44,255	+0.9%
2011	44,303	+0.1%
2021	42,536	−4.0%

Source: Censuses

== Economy ==
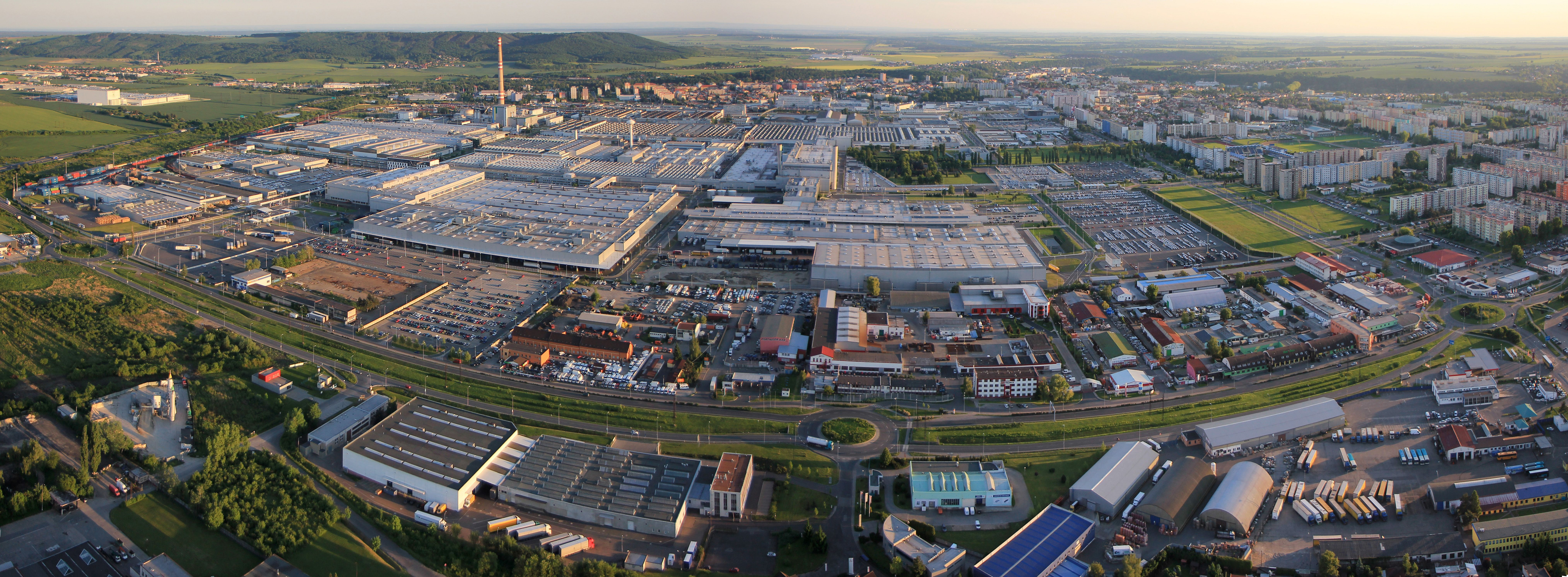
Aerial view of Škoda Auto factory

Mladá Boleslav became an industrial centre already in the 19th century. The main factor of its success was its location next to the Jizera River, which was a water source for the newly founded factories. The most significant was the textile industry – its largest representative, the Česana factory, had more than 2,000 employees at the end of the 19th century. Another industry in the Jizera valley included mills, breweries, distillery, soaps and perfumes factory, and production of synthetic fertilizers. Most of the factories were gradually shut down during the 20th century, mainly due to World War II and politics of the socialist republic.

In 1895, the Laurin & Klement company (the predecessor of Škoda Auto) was founded and the automotive industry became the main pillar of the city's economy. In 1925, Laurin & Klement was acquired by Škoda Works. During the 20th century, many car parts manufacturers were established in the city, including the producer of accumulators for motor vehicles Akuma (founded in 1903), from 1998 part of the FIAMM company. However, the Akuma factory was closed in 2009.

Since its inception, Škoda Auto is the most important and most influential industrial company in the Czech Republic. As of 2017, the company had 32,000 employees worldwide, of which 23,000 worked in Mladá Boleslav.

The Mladá Boleslav agglomeration was defined as a tool for drawing money from the European Structural and Investment Funds. It is an area that includes the city and its surroundings, linked to the city by commuting and migration. It has about 107,000 inhabitants.

== Transport ==
The D10 motorway from Prague to Turnov runs next to the city. The I/38 (the section from Česká Lípa District to Nymburk) and the I/16 road (the section from Mělník to Jičín) also run through the city.

Mladá Boleslav is located on the railway lines Prague–Tanvald, Kolín–Rumburk and Mladá Boleslav–Turnov. The city is served by three train stations: Mladá Boleslav hlavní nádraží, Mladá Boleslav město and Mladá Boleslav-Debř.

== Education ==
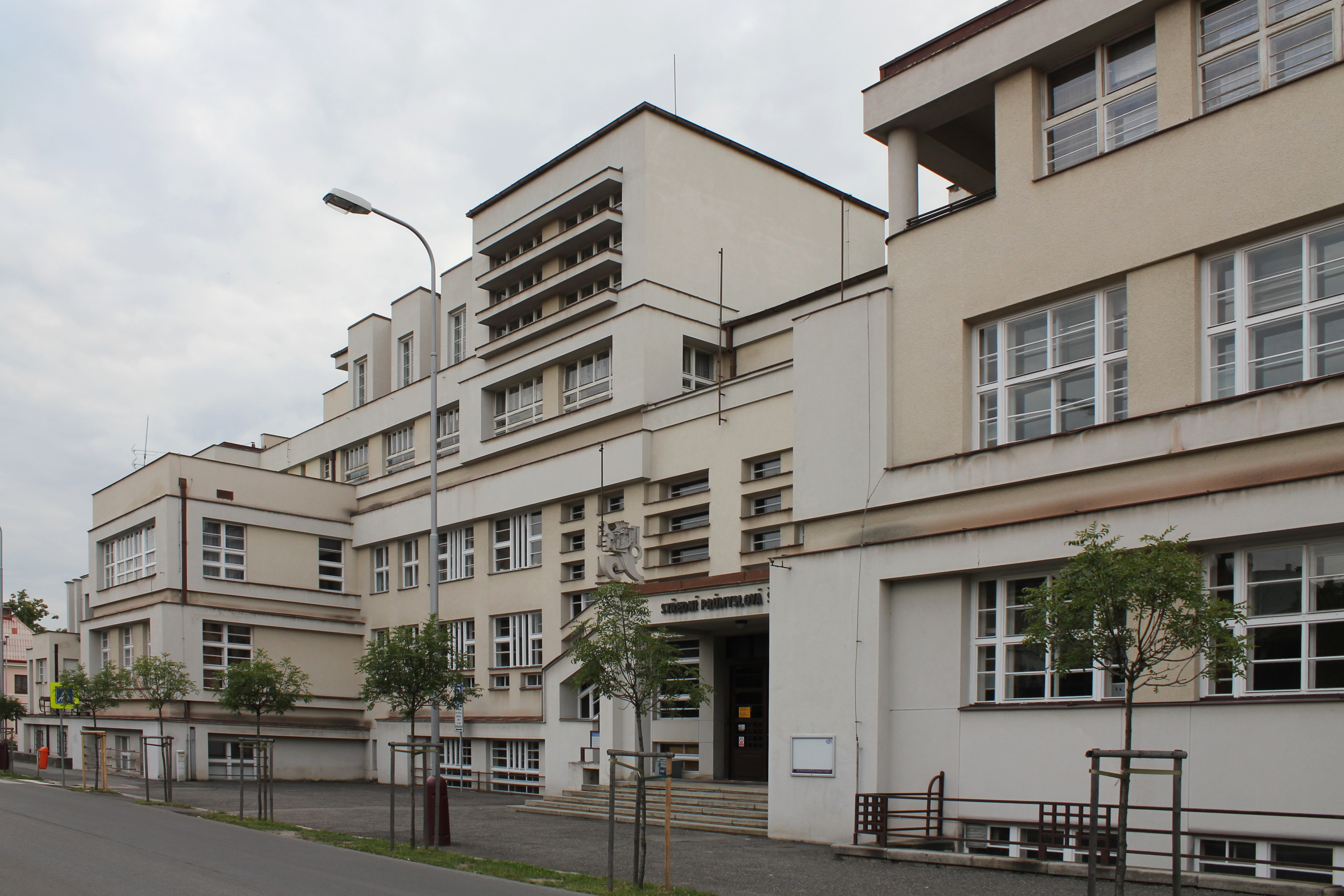
Secondary Industrial School

Škoda Auto University is a private university, founded by the company in 2000.

The Secondary Industrial School in Mladá Boleslav was founded in 1867 as one of the first vocational schools in the Czech lands. The development of the school was closely connected with the boom of the Škoda Auto factory. Before World War II and the first decade after it, the school was the only specialised industrial school in the country.

== Sport ==
The football club FK Mladá Boleslav has played in the Czech First League since 2004. They were runners-up in 2005–06, have been Czech Cup winners twice (2011 and 2016) and have qualified for the European cups for multiple times.

The ice hockey club BK Mladá Boleslav has been playing in the top-tier Czech Extraliga without interruption since 2014.

The city's floorball club, Florbal MB, belongs to the most successful Czech clubs of the 21st century. The team is a three-time national champion.

== Sights ==
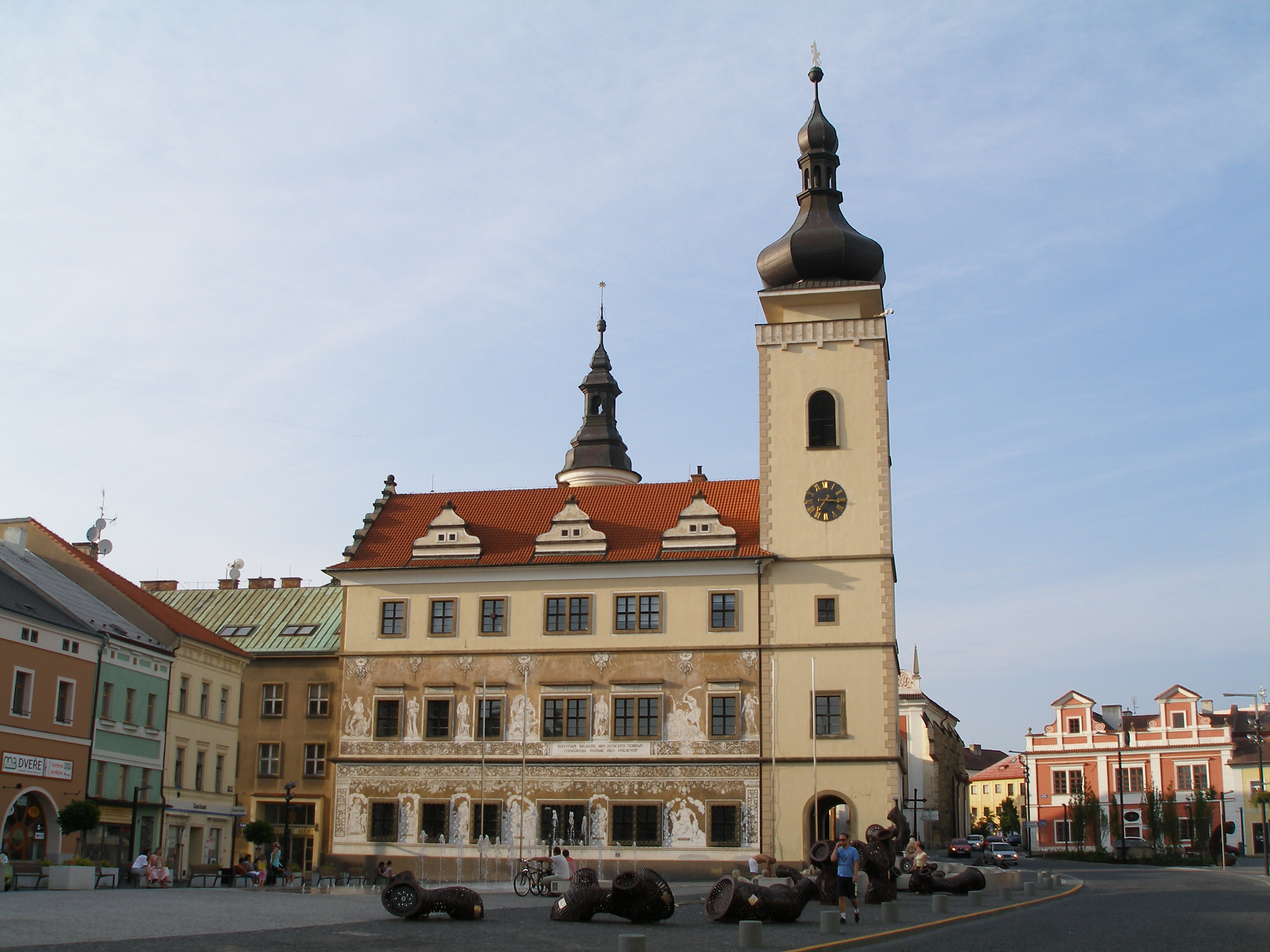
Old City Hall in the historic centre

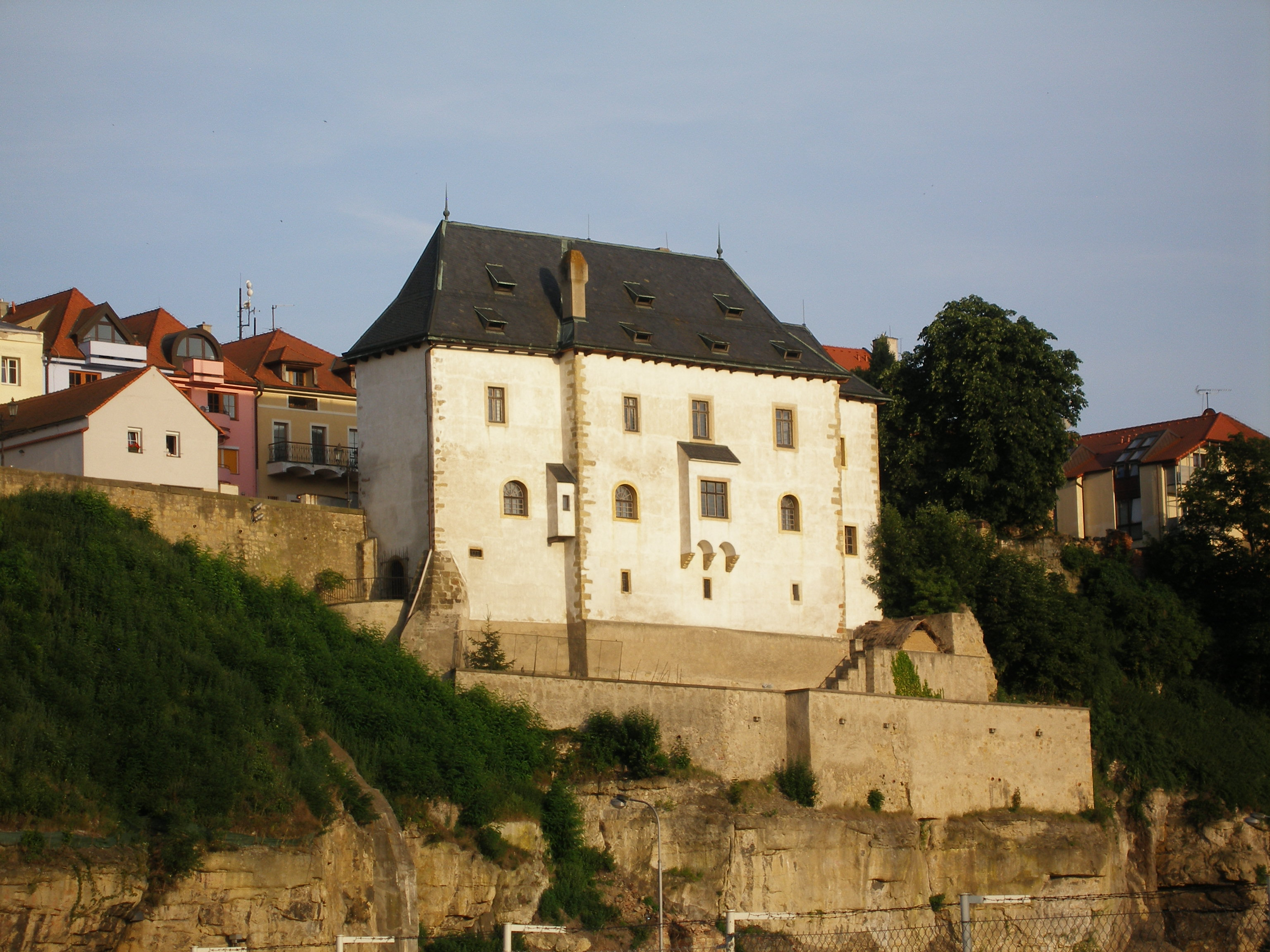
Templ Palace

The main landmark of the city is the Mladá Boleslav Castle. It was built in the first half of the 14th century. In the 16th century, it was rebuilt in the Renaissance style. The castle was a ruin after the Thirty Years' War, but at the beginning of the 18th century, it was rebuilt into barracks. During World War II, it was an internment centre of Jews. Today it houses the district archive and the Regional Museum with historical, cultural and social history collections.

The Old City Hall in the historic centre is a Renaissance house built in 1554–1559. It is decorated with ornamental and figurative sgraffiti. In the second half of the 19th century and in 1939–1941, the building was reconstructed and other wings were completed. It has two towers, the higher of them was built in 1779 and is open to the public as a lookout tower. The nearby New City Hall was built in the neo-Romanesque style in 1865–1867 and still serves its original purpose.

The Gothic building of Templ Palace comes from the years 1488–1493. It includes a historic exhibition and also serves cultural purposes.

The history and products of Škoda Auto are exhibited in Škoda Museum. It was opened in the reconstructed premises of the old factory in 1995.

An important architectural monument, protected as a national cultural monument, is the building of the Secondary Industrial School. It was designed by Jiří Kroha in the Functionalist and Constructivist styles and was built in 1923–1927. It is an exceptionally large building, still serving its original purpose. The sculptural decoration of the interiors is also valuable.

=== Religious monuments ===
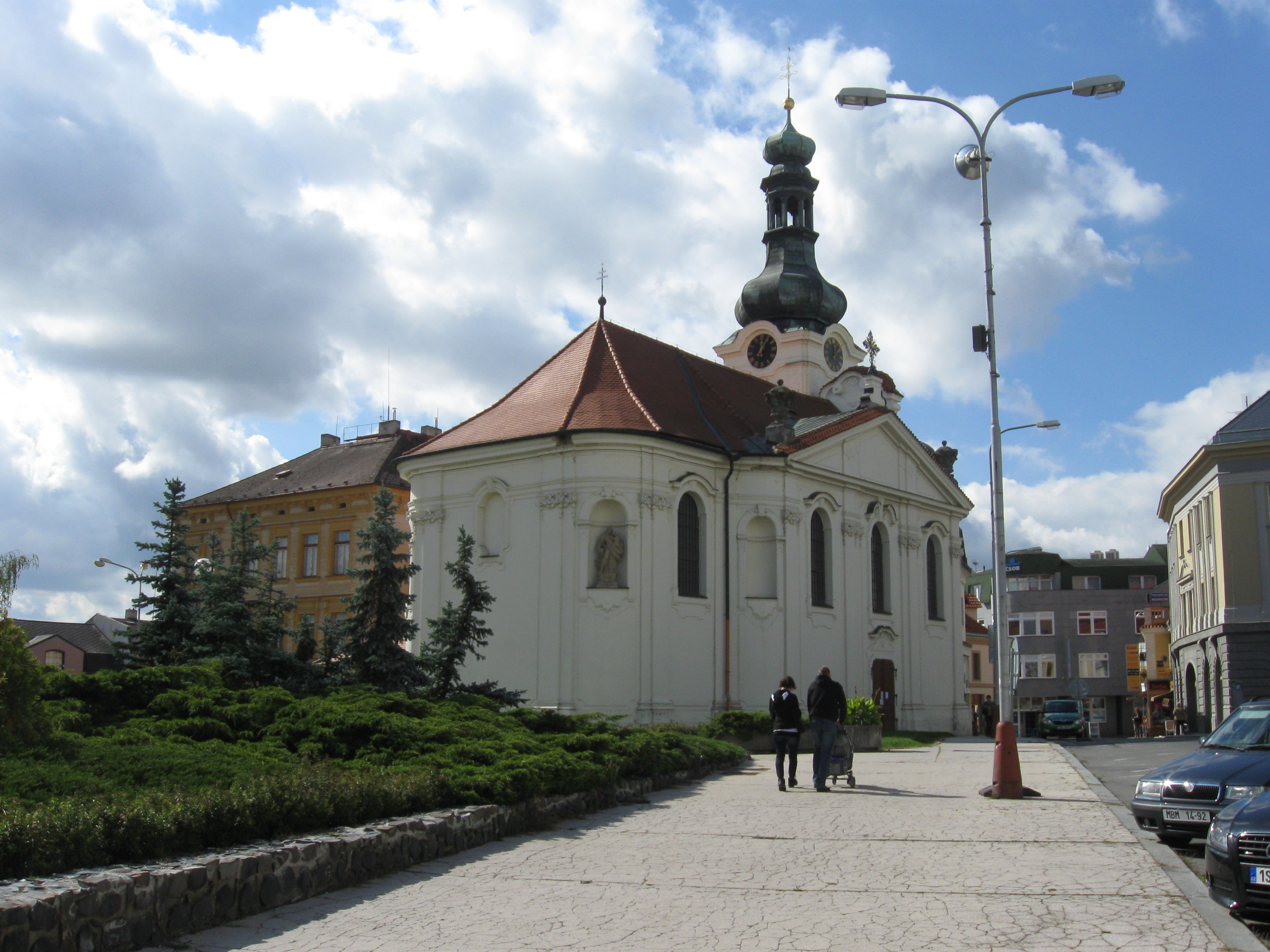
Church of Saint John of Nepomuk

The Church of the Assumption of the Virgin Mary is located next to the Old City Hall and is the main parish church of the city. It has a Gothic core from the mid-15th century. Baroque modifications were made in 1701–1702 and in 1761.

The Church of Saint John of Nepomuk is located on the eastern edge of the historic city centre and form the dominant feature of the square Náměstí Míru. It was originally a Gothic church from the 14th century, built outside the city gates. It was rebuilt in the Baroque style in 1727.

The Church of Saint Gall is located on a former cemetery, currently converted into a park. It is a Baroque church with a Gothic-Renaissance core. The tower dates from 1735.

The former Church of Saint Bonaventure served as a Benedictine monastery in the mid-14th century, but it is probably much older. A school of Moravian Church was established in the monastery in the 15th–17th centuries. After the Battle of White Mountain, the monastery complex was acquired by the Catholic Church, which rebuilt it in the Baroque style. In 1784–1785, the Piarists established a gymnasium and college here. The church was completely devastated in the 20th century and was only repaired in 2007. Today it is used for social and cultural purposes.

== Notable people ==
- Mikuláš Klaudyán (died 1521/1522), scholar
- Elijah Landsofer (died 1702), rabbi
- Siegfried Kapper (1821–1879), writer
- Václav Laurin (1865–1930), engineer and industrialist; lived and worked here
- Václav Klement (1868–1938), entrepreneur and industrialist; lived and worked here
- Alfréd Meissner (1871–1950), politician
- František Gellner (1881 – c. 1914), poet
- Jan Konůpek (1883–1950), illustrator and painter
- Gustav Hilmar (1891–1967), actor
- Frantisek Schubert (1894–1942), chess master
- Adina Mandlová (1910–1991), actress
- Josef Ludwig Holub (1930–1999), botanist
- Mila Rechcigl (born 1930), scientist and historian
- Zdenek Sekanina (born 1936), Czech-American astronomer
- Přemysl Sobotka (born 1944), politician
- Ota Jirák (1949–2026), actor and comedian
- Blanka Zizka (born 1955), Czech-American theatre director and playwright
- Jiří Hrdina (born 1958), ice hockey player
- Jan Železný (born 1966), javelin thrower, three-time Olympic winner
- Miroslav Bobek (born 1967), natural scientist and manager
- Jiri Vlcek (born 1978), Italian rower
- Radim Vrbata (born 1981), ice hockey player
- Martin Havlát (born 1981), ice hockey player
- Marek Schwarz (born 1986), ice hockey player
- Radim Šimek (born 1992), ice hockey player
- Filip Salač (born 2001), motorcycle rider

== Twin towns – sister cities ==
Mladá Boleslav is twinned with:

- Dieburg, Germany
- Pezinok, Slovakia
- Tiachiv, Ukraine
- Vantaa, Finland
