= Velvary =

- Town
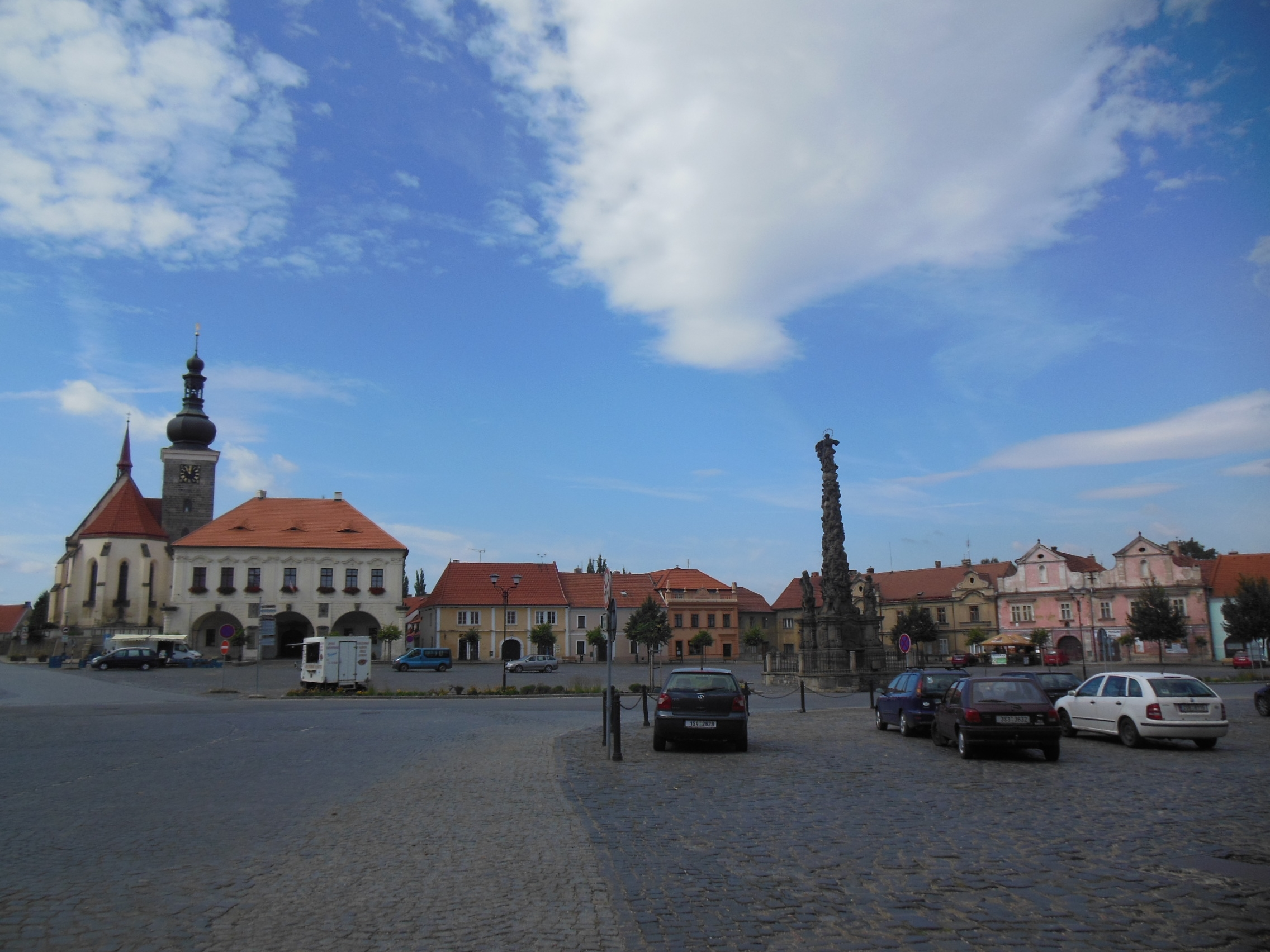
- Town square

- Flag Coat of arms

- Location in the Czech Republic
- Coordinates: 50°16′54″N 14°14′10″E
- Country: Czech Republic
- Region: Central Bohemian
- District: Kladno
- First mentioned: 1282

Government
  - Mayor: Radim Wolák

Area
  - Total: 18.10 km^{2} (6.99 sq mi)
- Elevation: 188 m (617 ft)

Population (2026-01-01)
  - Total: 3,147
  - Density: 173.9/km^{2} (450.3/sq mi)
- Time zone: UTC+1 (CET)
  - Summer (DST): UTC+2 (CEST)
- Postal code: 273 24
- Website: www.velvary.cz

Velvary (Czech pronunciation: [ˈvɛlvarɪ]) is a town in Kladno District in the Central Bohemian Region of the Czech Republic. It has about 3,100 inhabitants. The historic town centre is well preserved and is protected as an urban monument zone.

== Administrative division ==
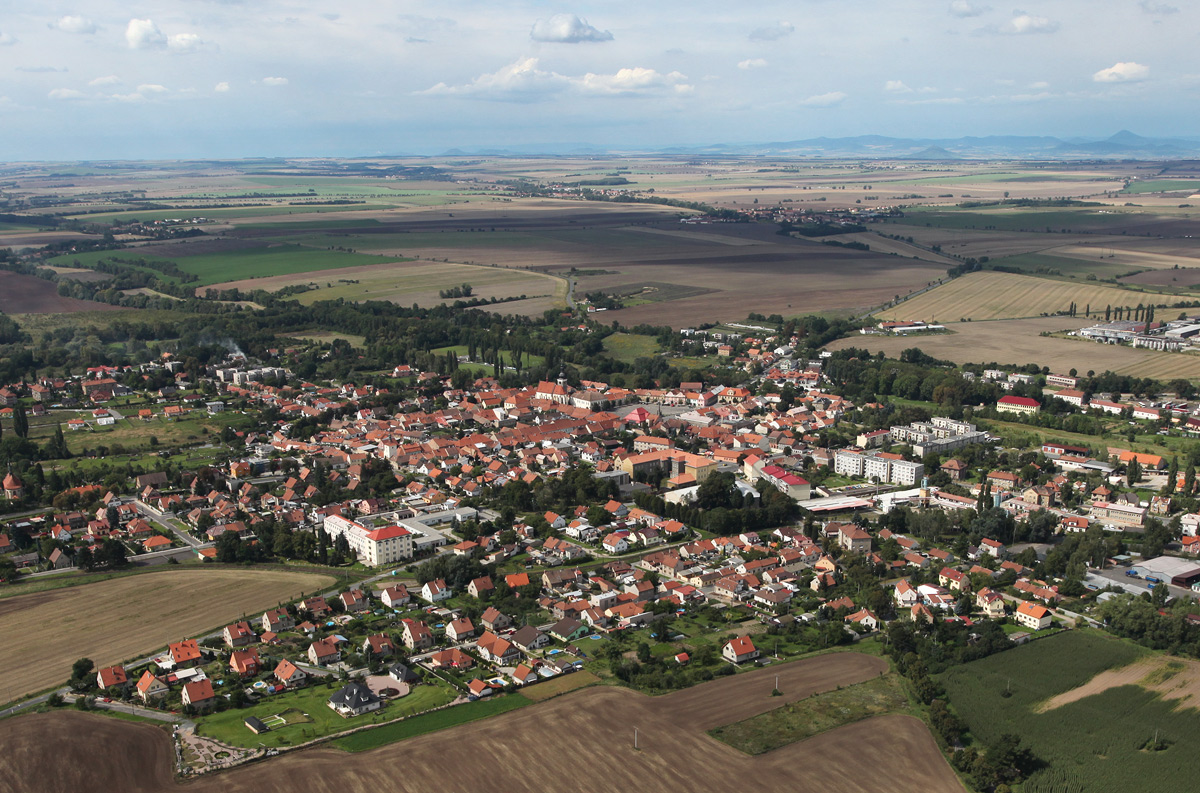
Aerial view of the town

Velvary consists of four municipal parts (in brackets population according to the 2021 census):

- Velvary (2,592)
- Ješín (166)
- Malá Bučina (13)
- Velká Bučina (243)

== Etymology ==
The name is derived from the Czech word velvaři, which was a colloquial term for people who cooked a lot (from velmi vařit, i.e. 'to cook a lot').

== Geography ==
Velvary is located about 18 kilometres (11 mi) northeast of Kladno and 22 km (14 mi) northwest of Prague. It lies in a flat agricultural landscape in the Lower Ohře Table. The highest point is at 272 m (892 ft) above sea level. The stream Bakovský potok flows through the town.

== History ==
The first written mention of Velvary is from 1282. For centuries, it was an important stop on the way from Prague to Saxony. After 1357, it became a royal property and it was promoted to a market town by King Charles IV. In 1482, it was promoted to a town by King Vladislaus II. The prosperity and development of the town ended with the outbreak of the Thirty Years' War. Velvary was looted several times and in 1639, it was burned down. The restoration of the town, which began at the end of the 17th century, was very slow, and it was not until the beginning of the 19th century that the town reached the size it had before the Thirty Years' War.

== Demographics ==
Historical population

| Year | Pop. | ±% |
|---|---|---|
| 1869 | 2,822 | — |
| 1880 | 3,146 | +11.5% |
| 1890 | 3,174 | +0.9% |
| 1900 | 3,221 | +1.5% |
| 1910 | 3,210 | −0.3% |

| Year | Pop. | ±% |
|---|---|---|
| 1921 | 3,053 | −4.9% |
| 1930 | 3,140 | +2.8% |
| 1950 | 2,749 | −12.5% |
| 1961 | 3,138 | +14.2% |
| 1970 | 3,040 | −3.1% |

| Year | Pop. | ±% |
|---|---|---|
| 1980 | 3,074 | +1.1% |
| 1991 | 2,848 | −7.4% |
| 2001 | 2,911 | +2.2% |
| 2011 | 2,993 | +2.8% |
| 2021 | 3,014 | +0.7% |

Source: Censuses

== Transport ==
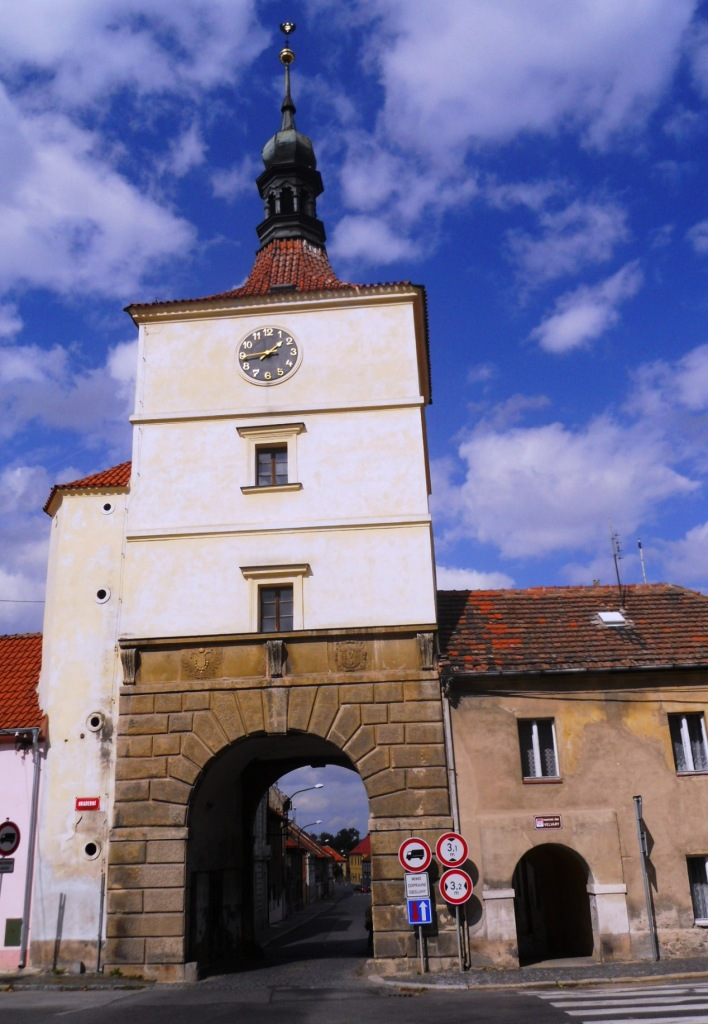
Prague Gate

The I/16 road (the section that connects Mělník with the D6 motorway) runs through the town.

Velvary is the terminus of a short local railway line heading from Kralupy nad Vltavou.

== Sights ==
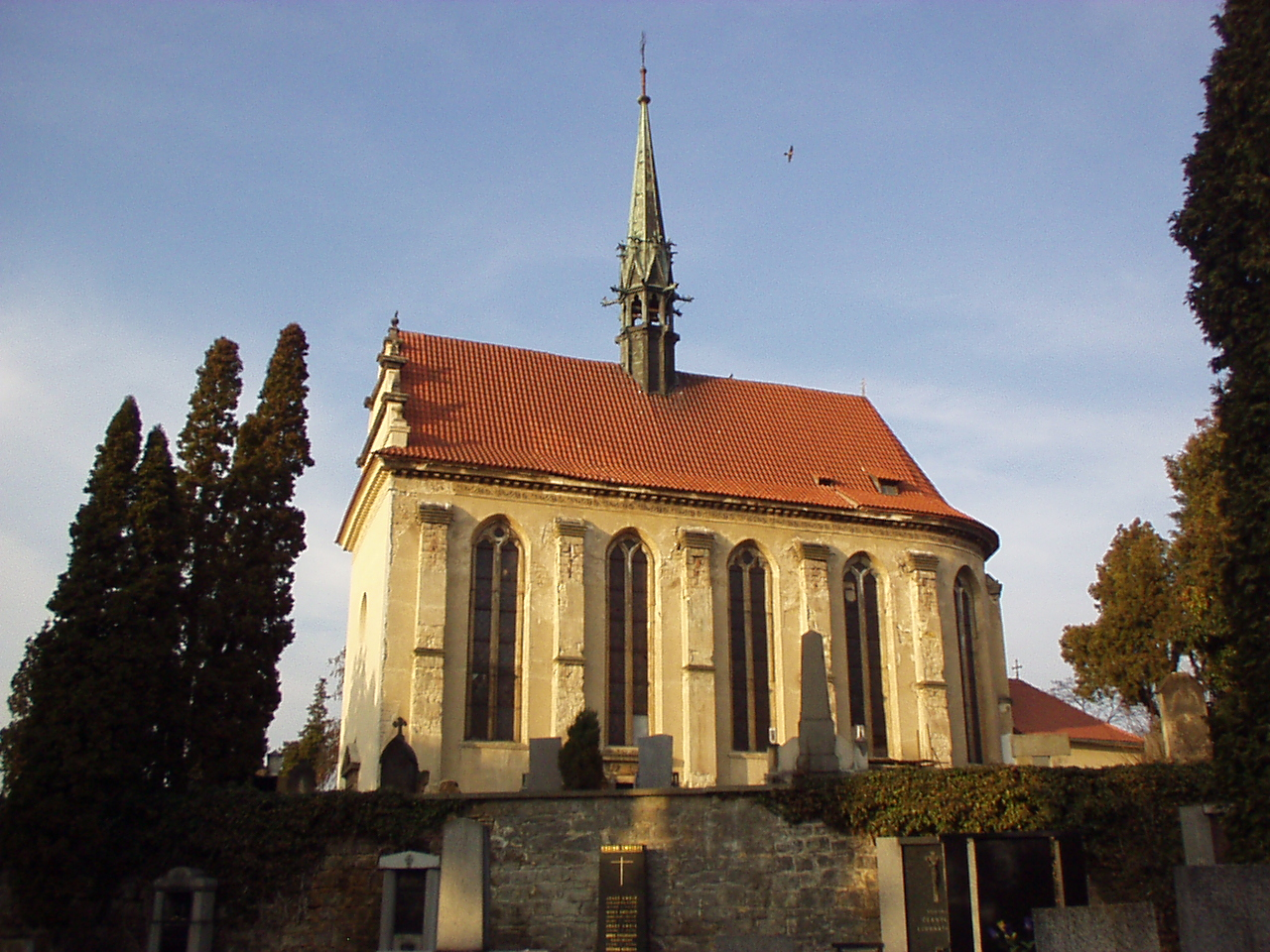
Church of Saint George

The major sights of the spacious square Náměstí Krále Vladislava include a Baroque Marian column (built in 1716–1719), the Baroque town hall from 1717, and the Church of Saint Catherine. The church is the most valuable monument of Velvary. It is originally a Gothic building, first mentioned in 1337. It was rebuilt in the second half of the 15th century and modified in the Renaissance style in 1580–1604, as part of reconstruction after a lightning strike. At the end of the 17th century, the church was modified in the Baroque style, but none of these modifications has been preserved as a result of the neo-Gothic reconstruction at the beginning of the 20th century. The interior of the church is decorated with murals from the mid-15th century.

The Church of Saint George is located in the southern part of the town. It was built in the Renaissance style in 1613–1616. The church is surrounded by a large cemetery.

The Church of All Saints is located in the western part of the town and is the only remnant of the former settlement of Malovary, which fused with Velvary in the 16th century. The church probably dates from the 13th century. Around 1700, it was extended and modified in the Baroque style. In the mid-19 century, it was rebuilt into its present form.

The Prague Gate was built in the Renaissance style in 1580 and is the last preserved of three town gates.

== Notable people ==
- Jan Antonín Koželuh (1738–1814), composer
- Leopold Koželuh (1747–1818), composer
- Václav Klement (1868–1938), automotive pioneer
- Karel Treybal (1885–1941), chess player; worked here
