= Hořešovice =

- Municipality
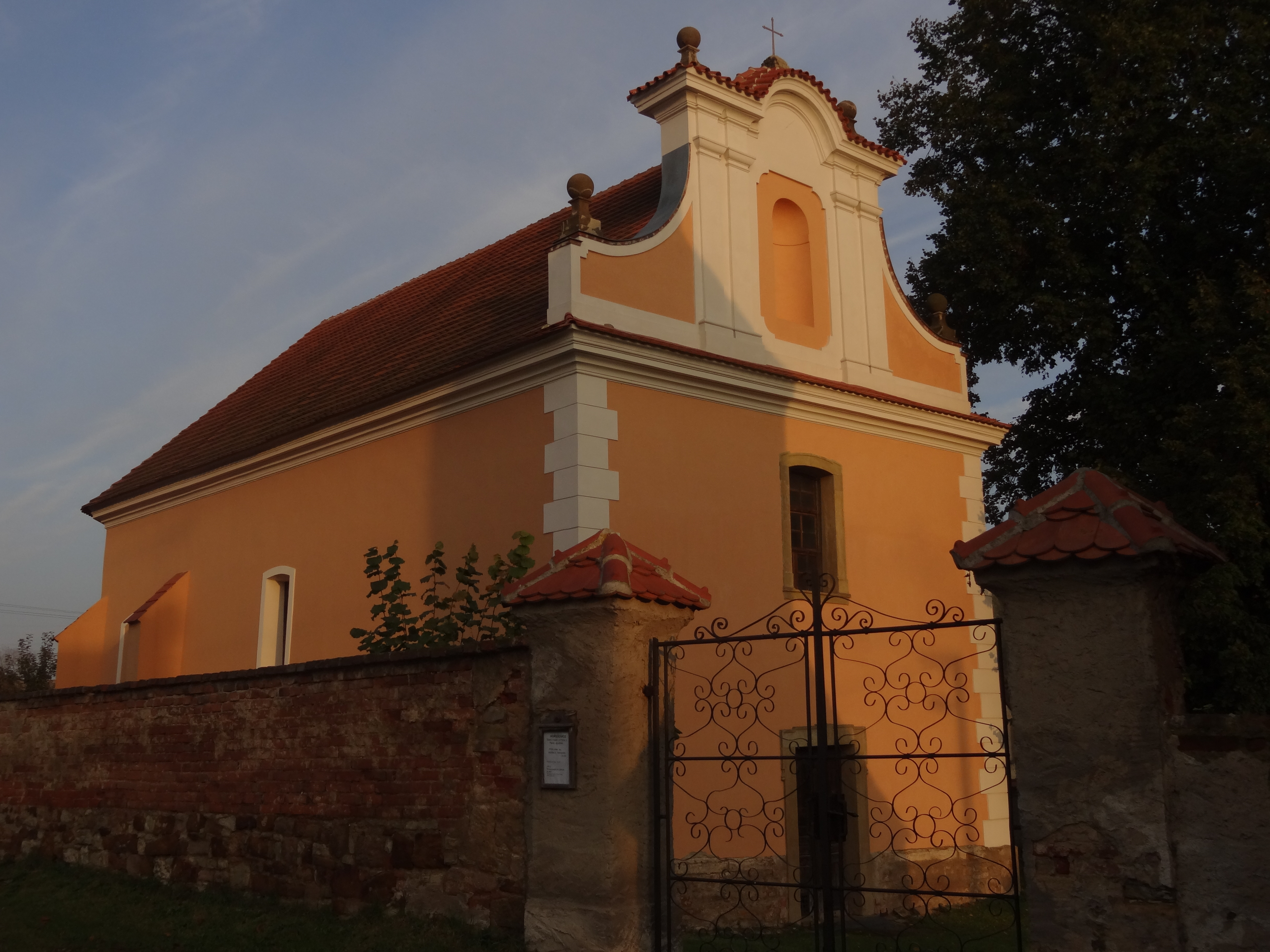
- Church of Saints Peter and Paul

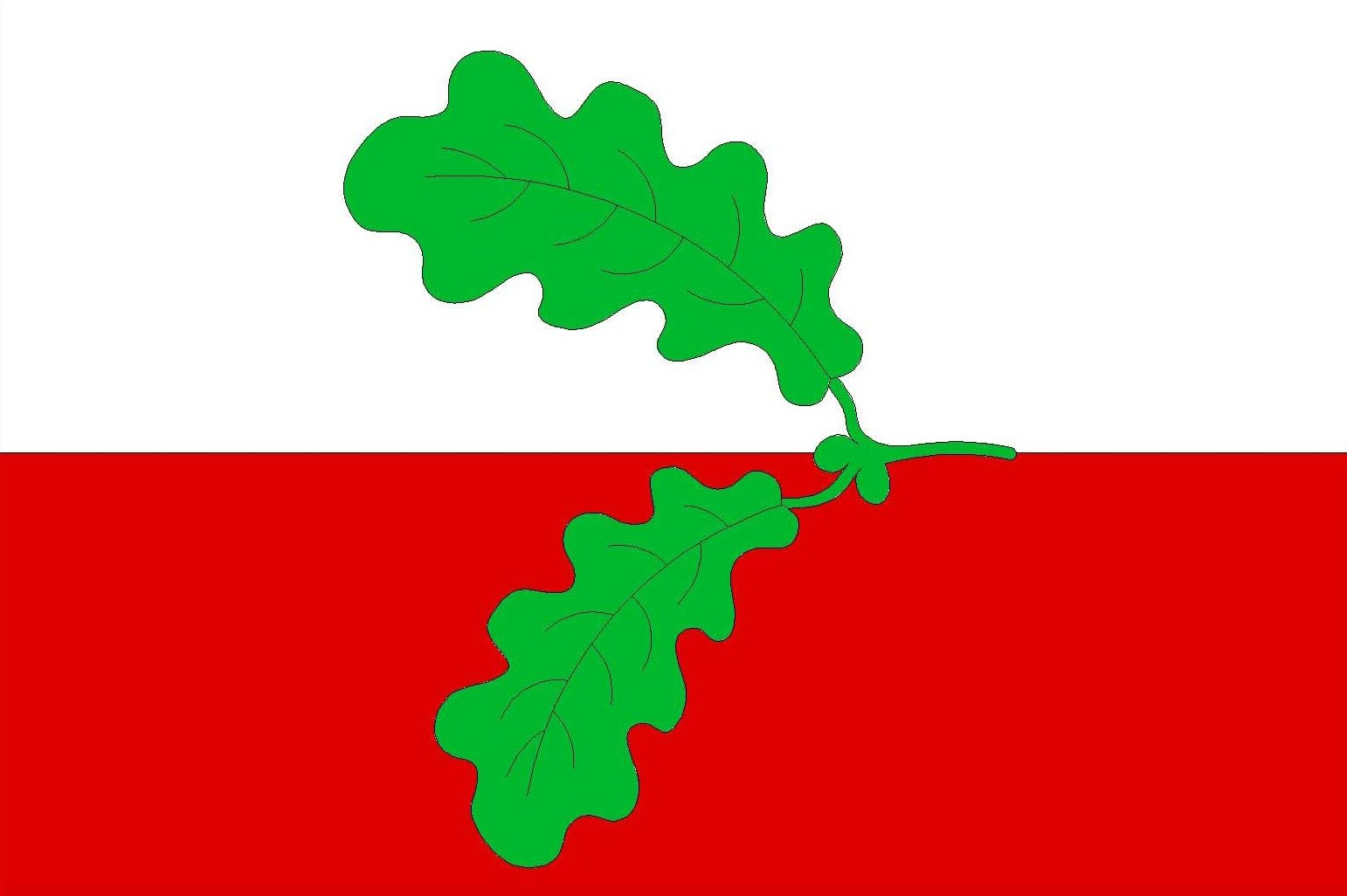
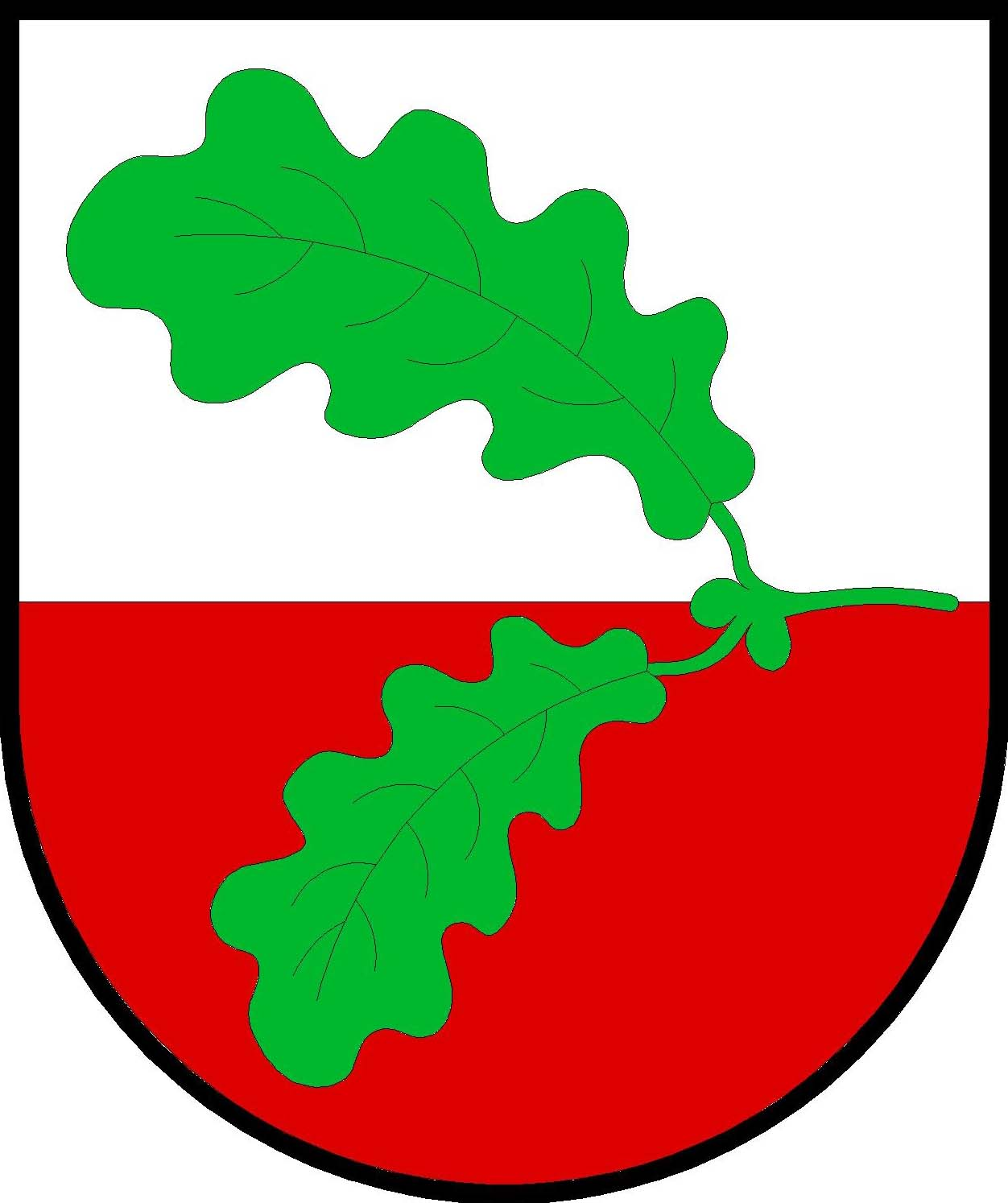
- Flag Coat of arms

- Location in the Czech Republic
- Coordinates: 50°16′18″N 13°58′0″E
- Country: Czech Republic
- Region: Central Bohemian
- District: Kladno
- First mentioned: 1227

Area
  - Total: 4.36 km^{2} (1.68 sq mi)
- Elevation: 278 m (912 ft)

Population (2026-01-01)
  - Total: 260
  - Density: 60/km^{2} (150/sq mi)
- Time zone: UTC+1 (CET)
  - Summer (DST): UTC+2 (CEST)
- Postal code: 273 74
- Website: www.horesovice.cz

Hořešovice is a municipality and village in Kladno District in the Central Bohemian Region of the Czech Republic. It has about 300 inhabitants.

== Demographics ==
Historical population
Year	Pop.	±%
1869	329	—
1880	372	+13.1%
1890	379	+1.9%
1900	430	+13.5%
1910	437	+1.6%
1921	404	−7.6%
1930	396	−2.0%
1950	290	−26.8%
1961	268	−7.6%
1970	223	−16.8%
1980	216	−3.1%
1991	257	+19.0%
2001	250	−2.7%
2011	263	+5.2%
2021	249	−5.3%
Source: Censuses
