= Neuměřice =

- Municipality
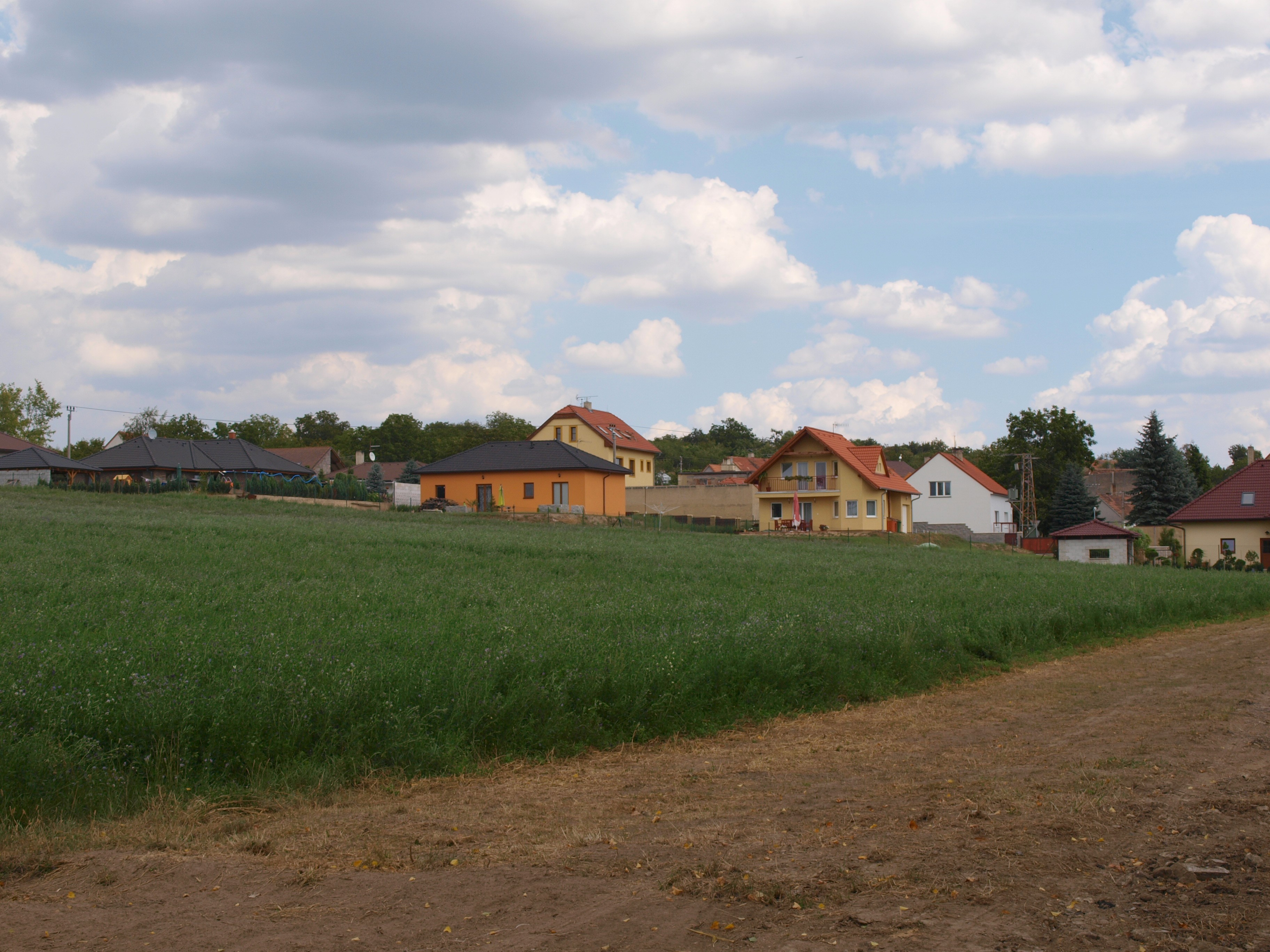
- View from the west

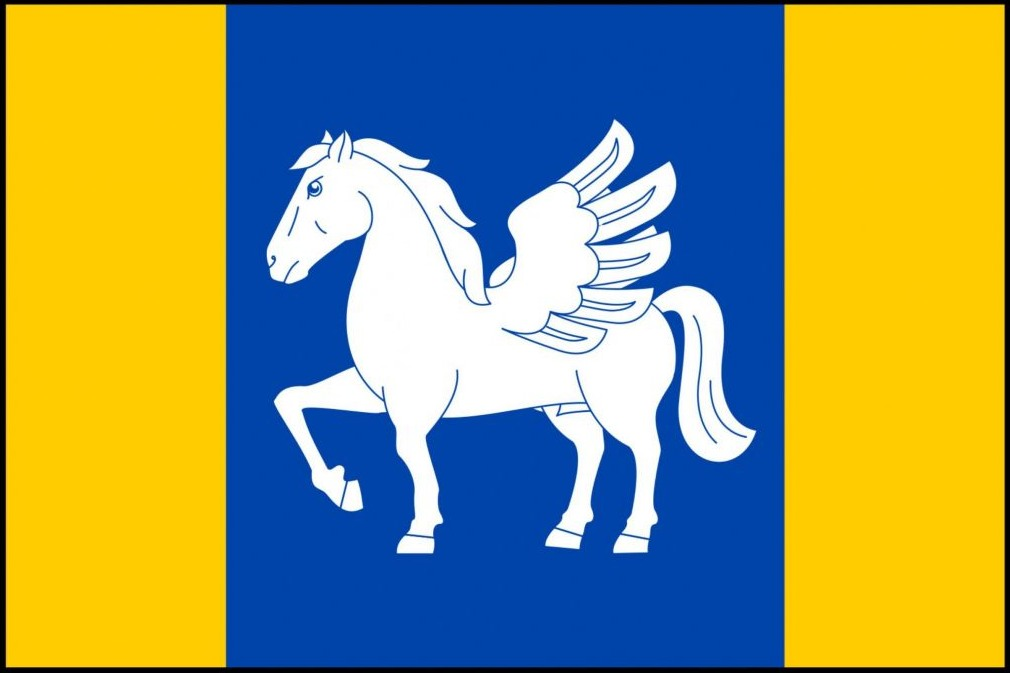
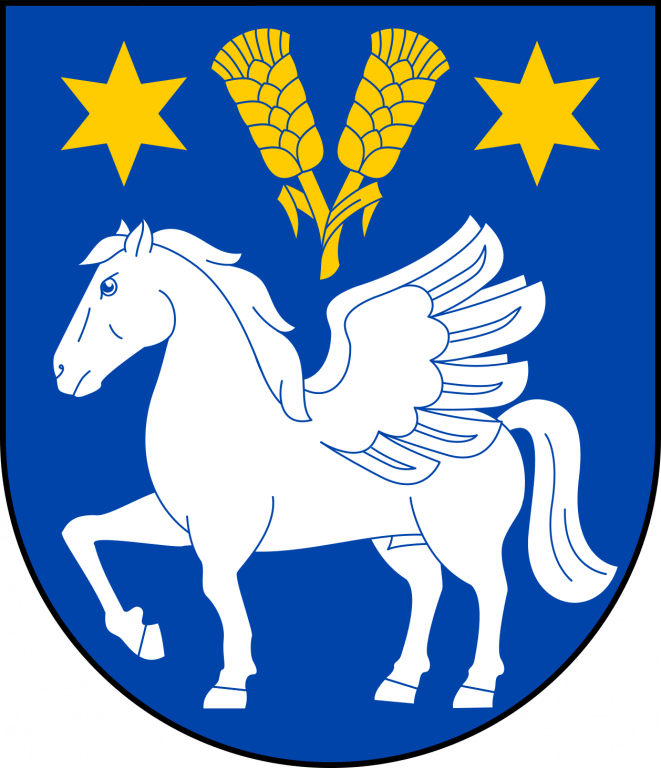
- Flag Coat of arms

- Location in the Czech Republic
- Coordinates: 50°14′30″N 14°13′12″E
- Country: Czech Republic
- Region: Central Bohemian
- District: Kladno
- First mentioned: 1158

Area
  - Total: 5.65 km^{2} (2.18 sq mi)
- Elevation: 198 m (650 ft)

Population (2026-01-01)
  - Total: 444
  - Density: 78.6/km^{2} (204/sq mi)
- Time zone: UTC+1 (CET)
  - Summer (DST): UTC+2 (CEST)
- Postal code: 273 26
- Website: www.obec-neumerice.cz

Neuměřice is a municipality and village in Kladno District in the Central Bohemian Region of the Czech Republic. It has about 400 inhabitants.

== Demographics ==
Historical population
Year	Pop.	±%
1869	536	—
1880	652	+21.6%
1890	650	−0.3%
1900	668	+2.8%
1910	682	+2.1%
1921	656	−3.8%
1930	716	+9.1%
1950	558	−22.1%
1961	539	−3.4%
1970	492	−8.7%
1980	438	−11.0%
1991	378	−13.7%
2001	357	−5.6%
2011	423	+18.5%
2021	432	+2.1%
Source: Censuses
