= Plchov =

- Municipality
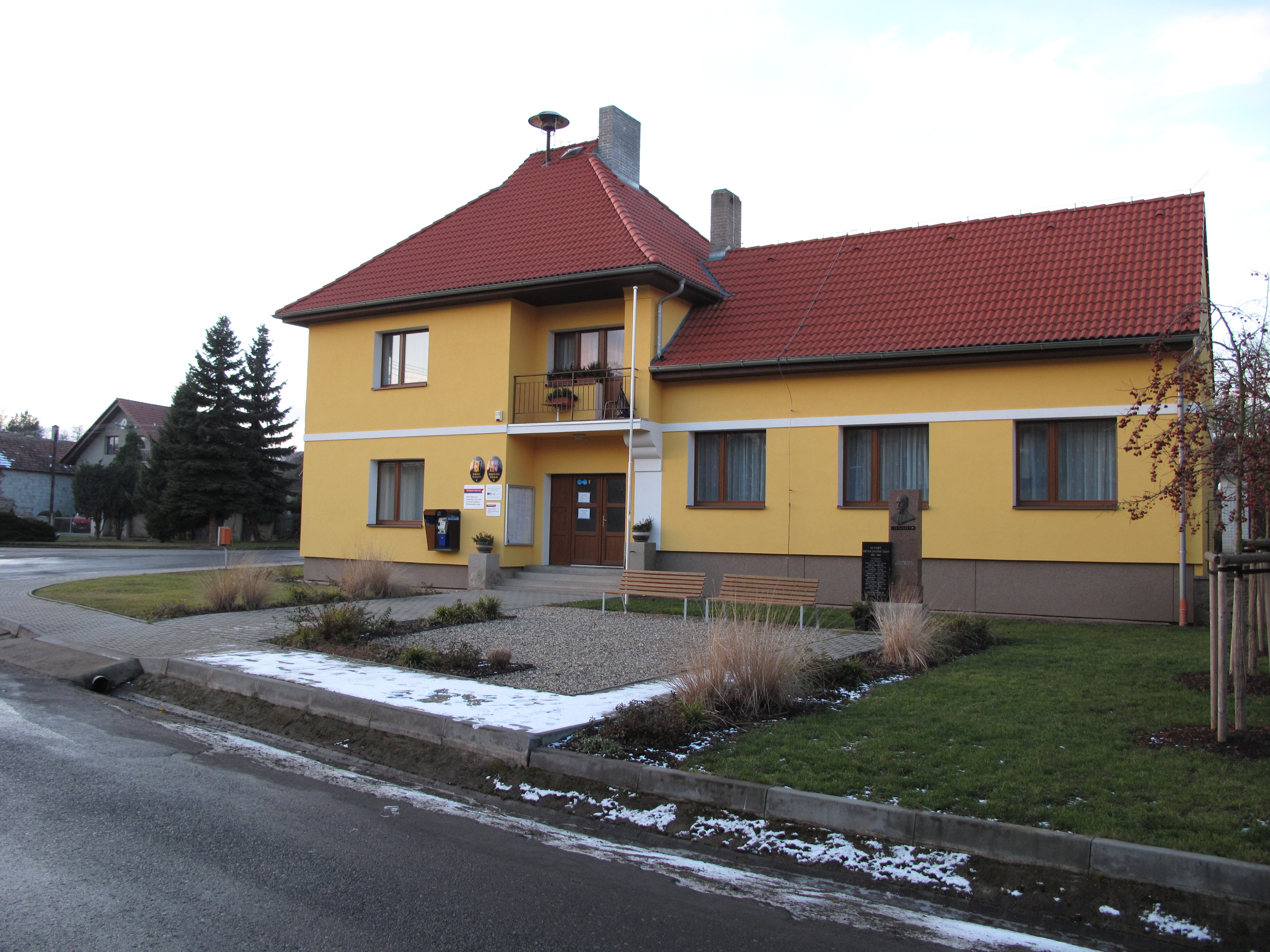
- Municipal office

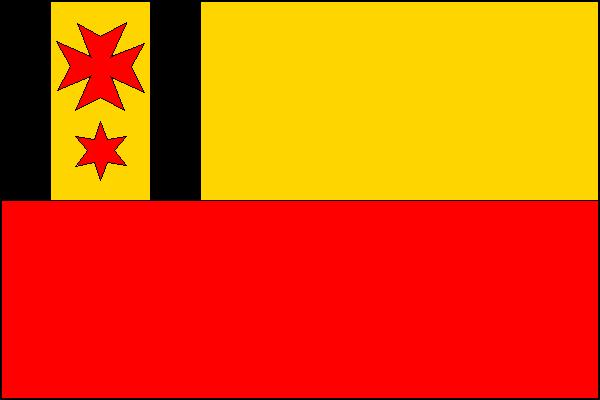
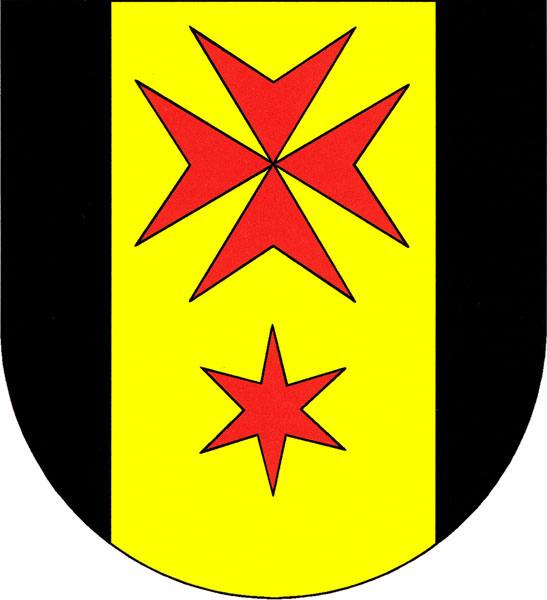
- Flag Coat of arms

- Location in the Czech Republic
- Coordinates: 50°15′19″N 13°59′12″E
- Country: Czech Republic
- Region: Central Bohemian
- District: Kladno
- First mentioned: 1227

Area
  - Total: 4.02 km^{2} (1.55 sq mi)
- Elevation: 238 m (781 ft)

Population (2026-01-01)
  - Total: 196
  - Density: 48.8/km^{2} (126/sq mi)
- Time zone: UTC+1 (CET)
  - Summer (DST): UTC+2 (CEST)
- Postal code: 273 75
- Website: www.plchov.cz

Plchov is a municipality and village in Kladno District in the Central Bohemian Region of the Czech Republic. It has about 200 inhabitants.

== Demographics ==
Historical population
Year	Pop.	±%
1869	234	—
1880	230	−1.7%
1890	266	+15.7%
1900	306	+15.0%
1910	292	−4.6%
1921	305	+4.5%
1930	285	−6.6%
1950	201	−29.5%
1961	180	−10.4%
1970	179	−0.6%
1980	177	−1.1%
1991	173	−2.3%
2001	169	−2.3%
2011	189	+11.8%
2021	195	+3.2%
Source: Censuses
