= Páleč =

- Municipality
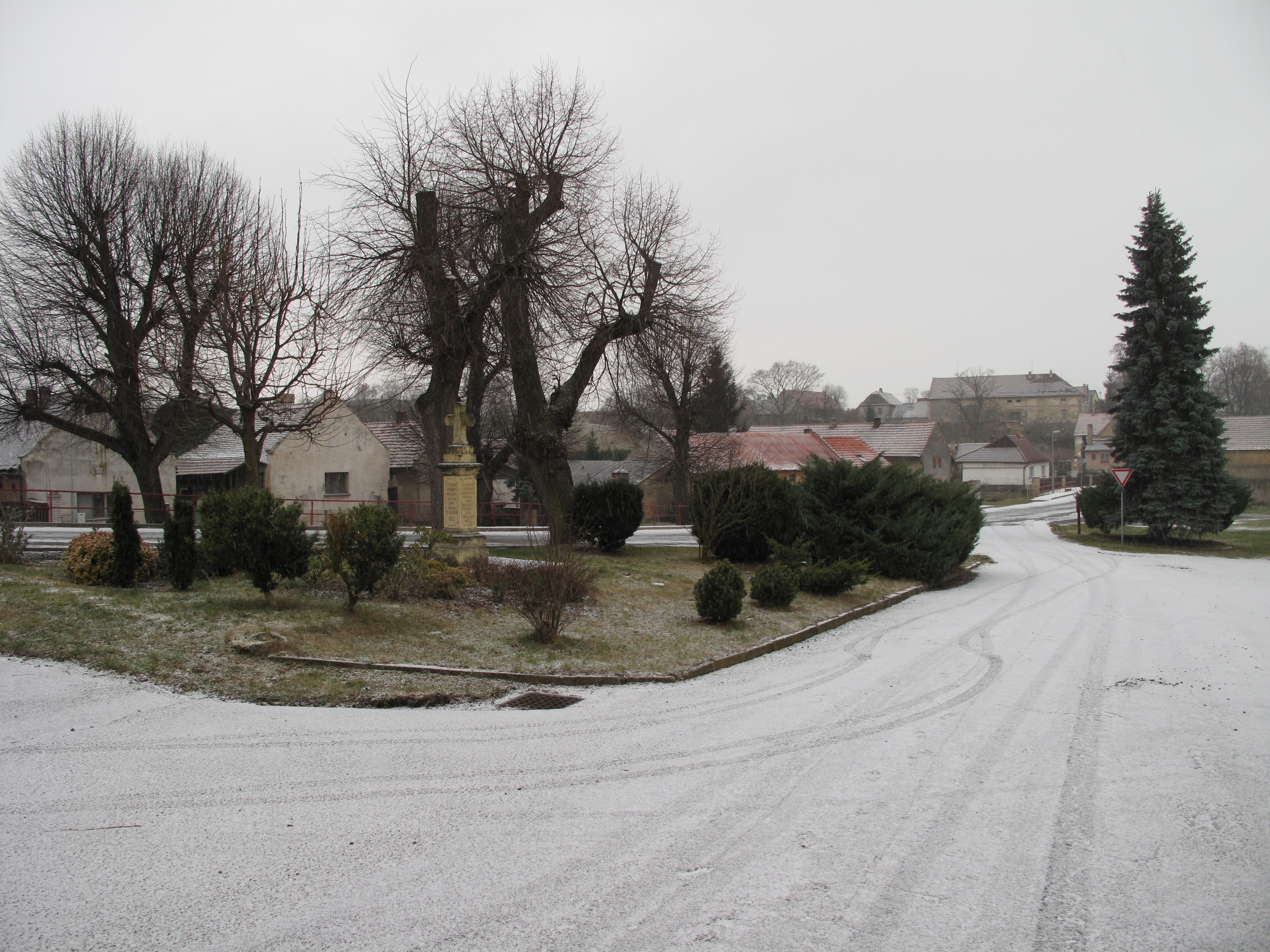
- Centre of Páleč

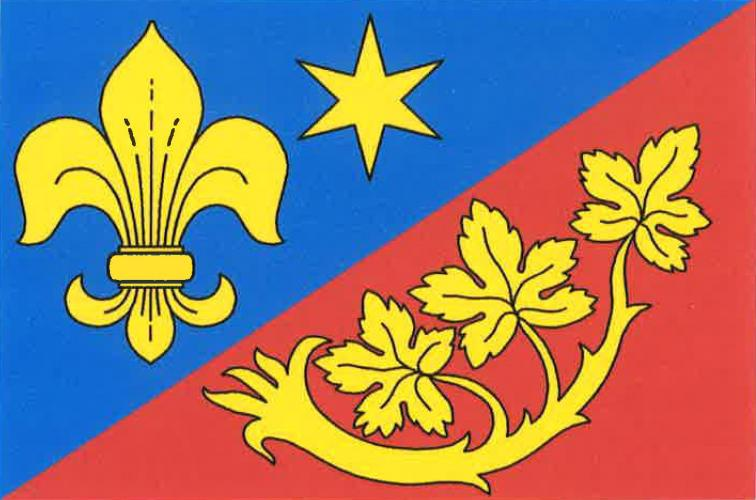
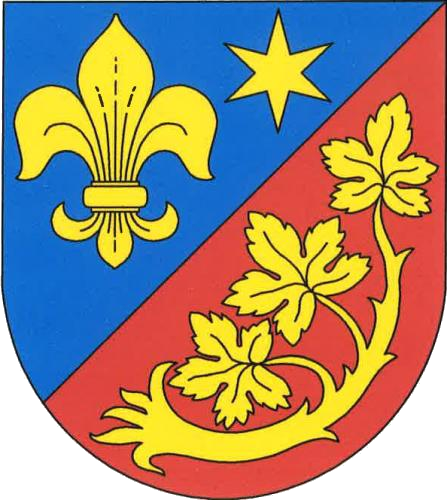
- Flag Coat of arms

- Location in the Czech Republic
- Coordinates: 50°18′43″N 14°2′59″E
- Country: Czech Republic
- Region: Central Bohemian
- District: Kladno
- First mentioned: 1316

Area
  - Total: 5.53 km^{2} (2.14 sq mi)
- Elevation: 254 m (833 ft)

Population (2026-01-01)
  - Total: 221
  - Density: 40.0/km^{2} (104/sq mi)
- Time zone: UTC+1 (CET)
  - Summer (DST): UTC+2 (CEST)
- Postal code: 273 71
- Website: www.obecpalec.cz

Páleč is a municipality and village in Kladno District in the Central Bohemian Region of the Czech Republic. It has about 200 inhabitants.

== Demographics ==
Historical population
Year	Pop.	±%
1869	393	—
1880	431	+9.7%
1890	432	+0.2%
1900	416	−3.7%
1910	477	+14.7%
1921	469	−1.7%
1930	433	−7.7%
1950	340	−21.5%
1961	301	−11.5%
1970	256	−15.0%
1980	221	−13.7%
1991	167	−24.4%
2001	164	−1.8%
2011	206	+25.6%
2021	222	+7.8%
Source: Censuses
