= Jarpice =

- Municipality
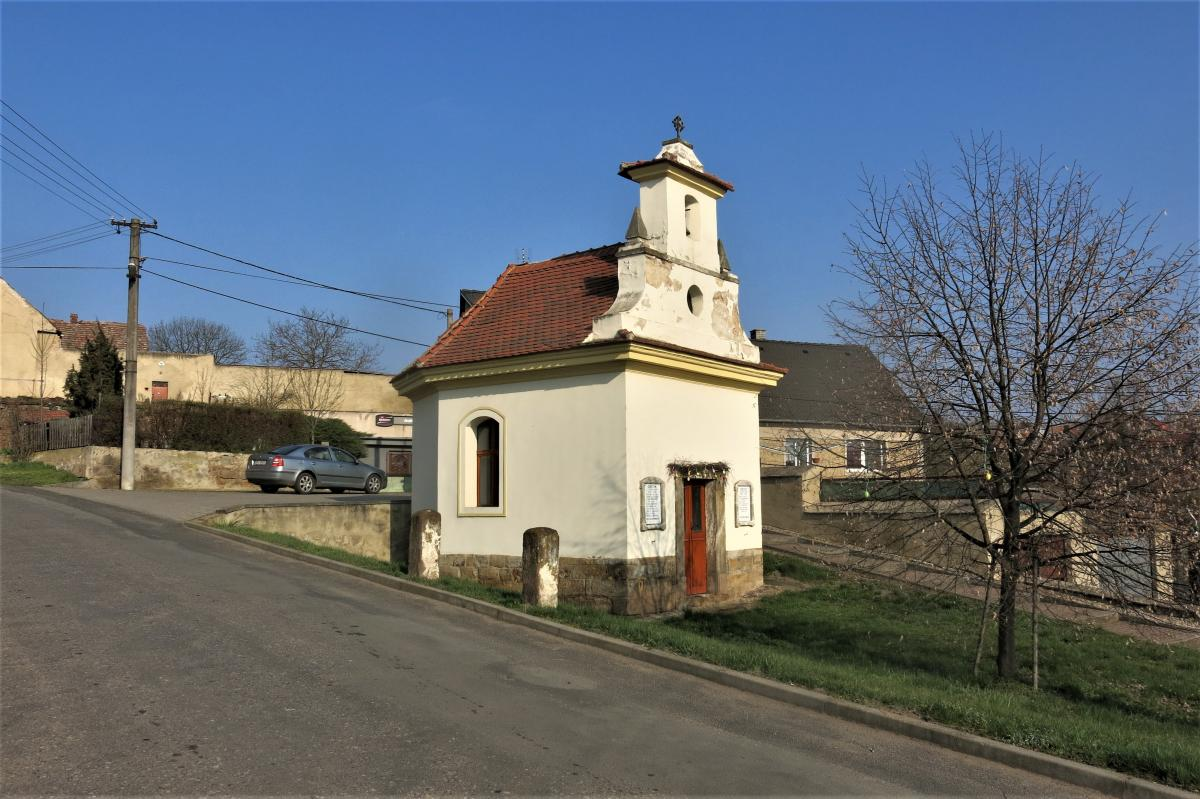
- Chapel of Saint Isidore the Laborer

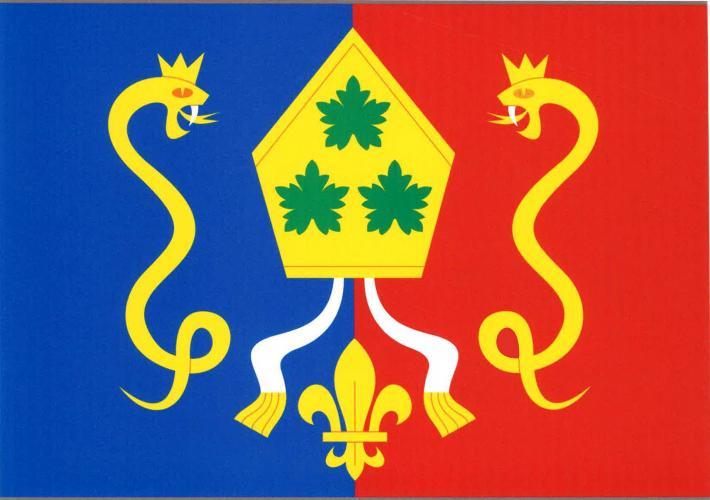
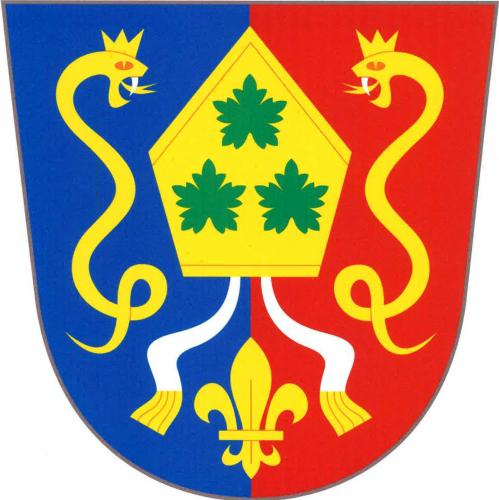
- Flag Coat of arms

- Location in the Czech Republic
- Coordinates: 50°19′18″N 14°5′7″E
- Country: Czech Republic
- Region: Central Bohemian
- District: Kladno
- First mentioned: 1318

Area
  - Total: 7.10 km^{2} (2.74 sq mi)
- Elevation: 223 m (732 ft)

Population (2026-01-01)
  - Total: 315
  - Density: 44.4/km^{2} (115/sq mi)
- Time zone: UTC+1 (CET)
  - Summer (DST): UTC+2 (CEST)
- Postal code: 273 72
- Website: www.jarpice.cz

Jarpice is a municipality and village in Kladno District in the Central Bohemian Region of the Czech Republic. It has about 300 inhabitants.

== Administrative division ==
Jarpice consists of two municipal parts (in brackets population according to the 2021 census):

- Jarpice (278)
- Budenice (22)

== Demographics ==
Historical population
Year	Pop.	±%
1869	586	—
1880	624	+6.5%
1890	658	+5.4%
1900	668	+1.5%
1910	612	−8.4%
1921	625	+2.1%
1930	621	−0.6%
1950	411	−33.8%
1961	390	−5.1%
1970	380	−2.6%
1980	294	−22.6%
1991	235	−20.1%
2001	241	+2.6%
2011	283	+17.4%
2021	300	+6.0%
Source: Censuses
