= Libovice =

- Municipality
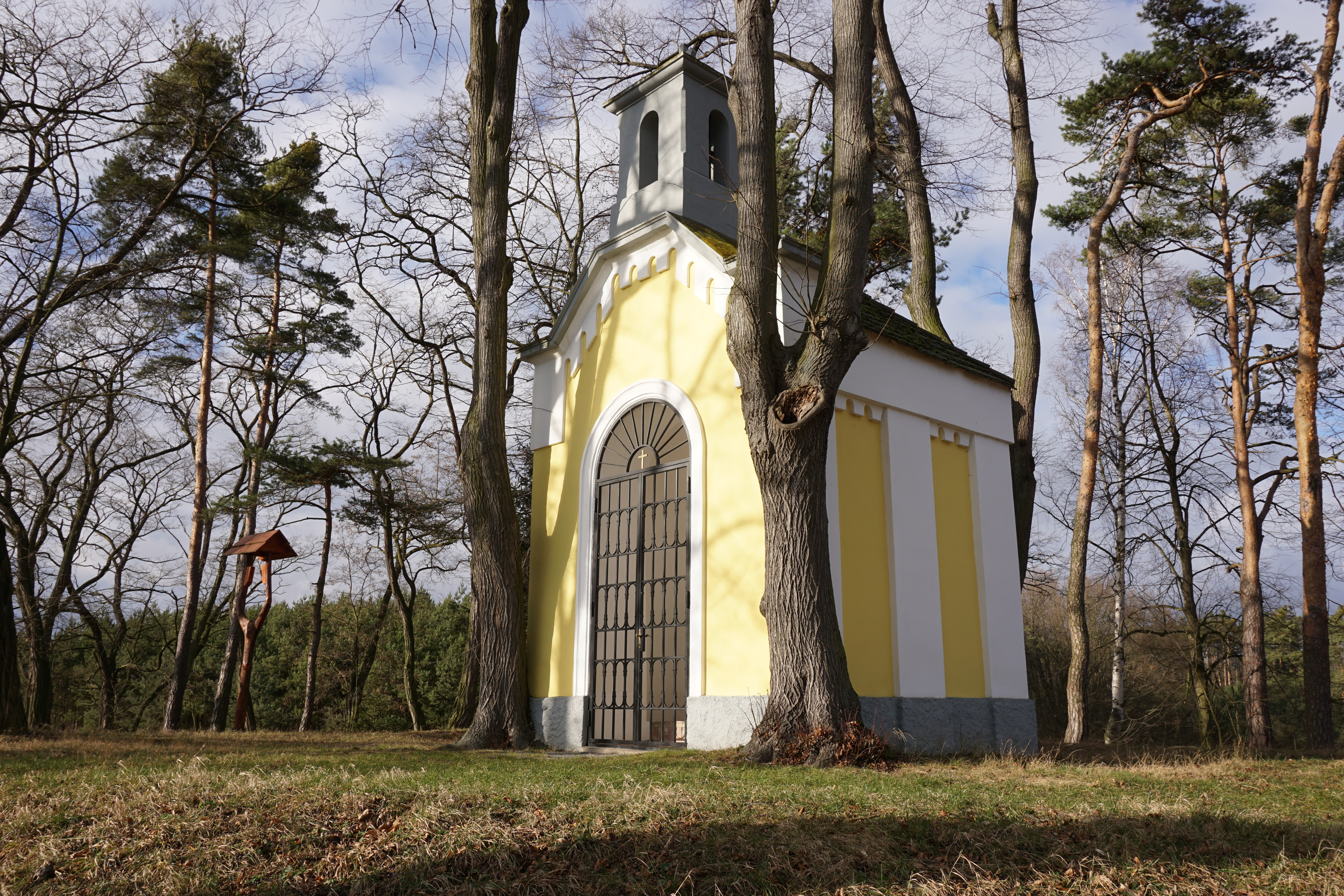
- Chapel of Saint John of Nepomuk

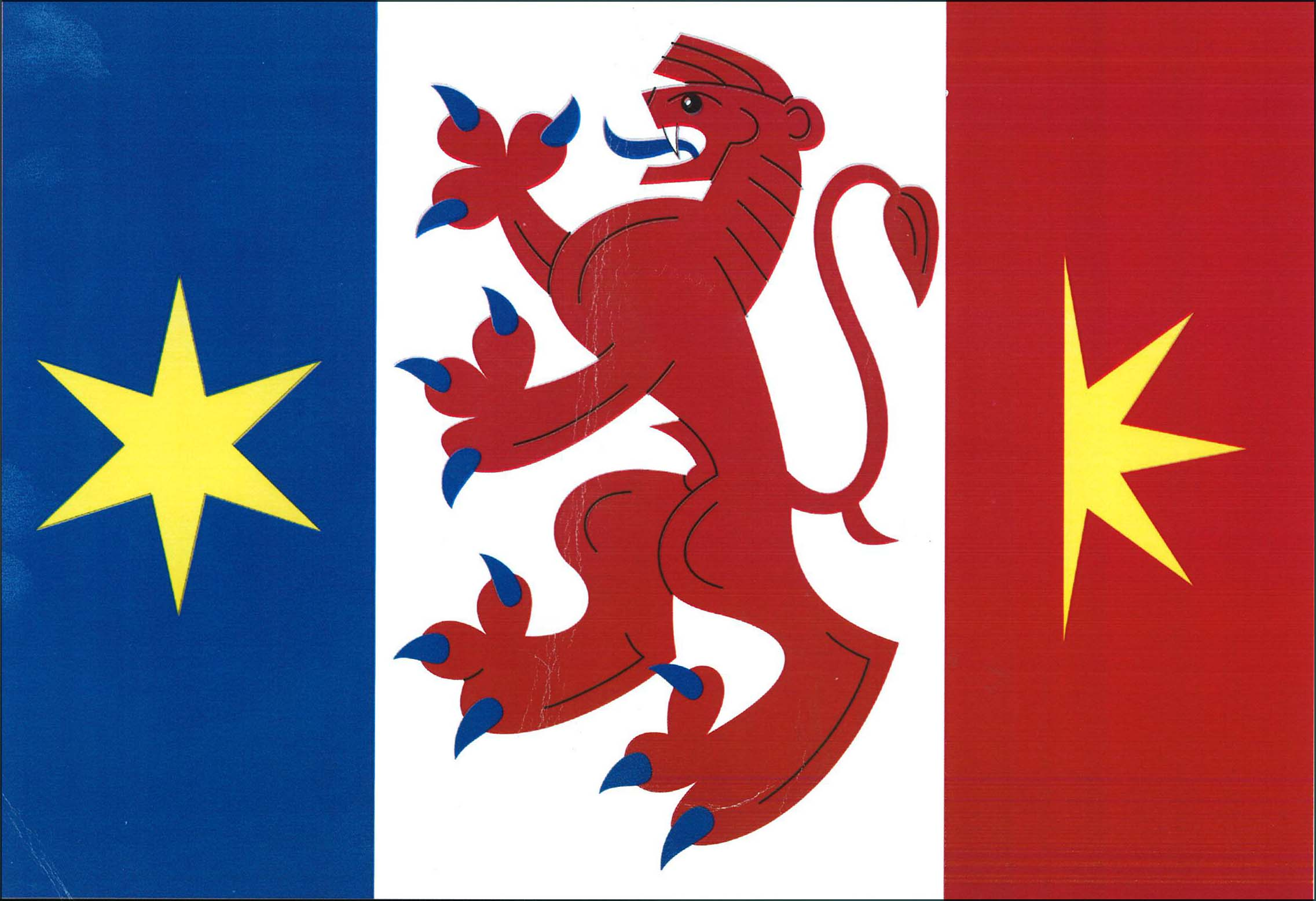
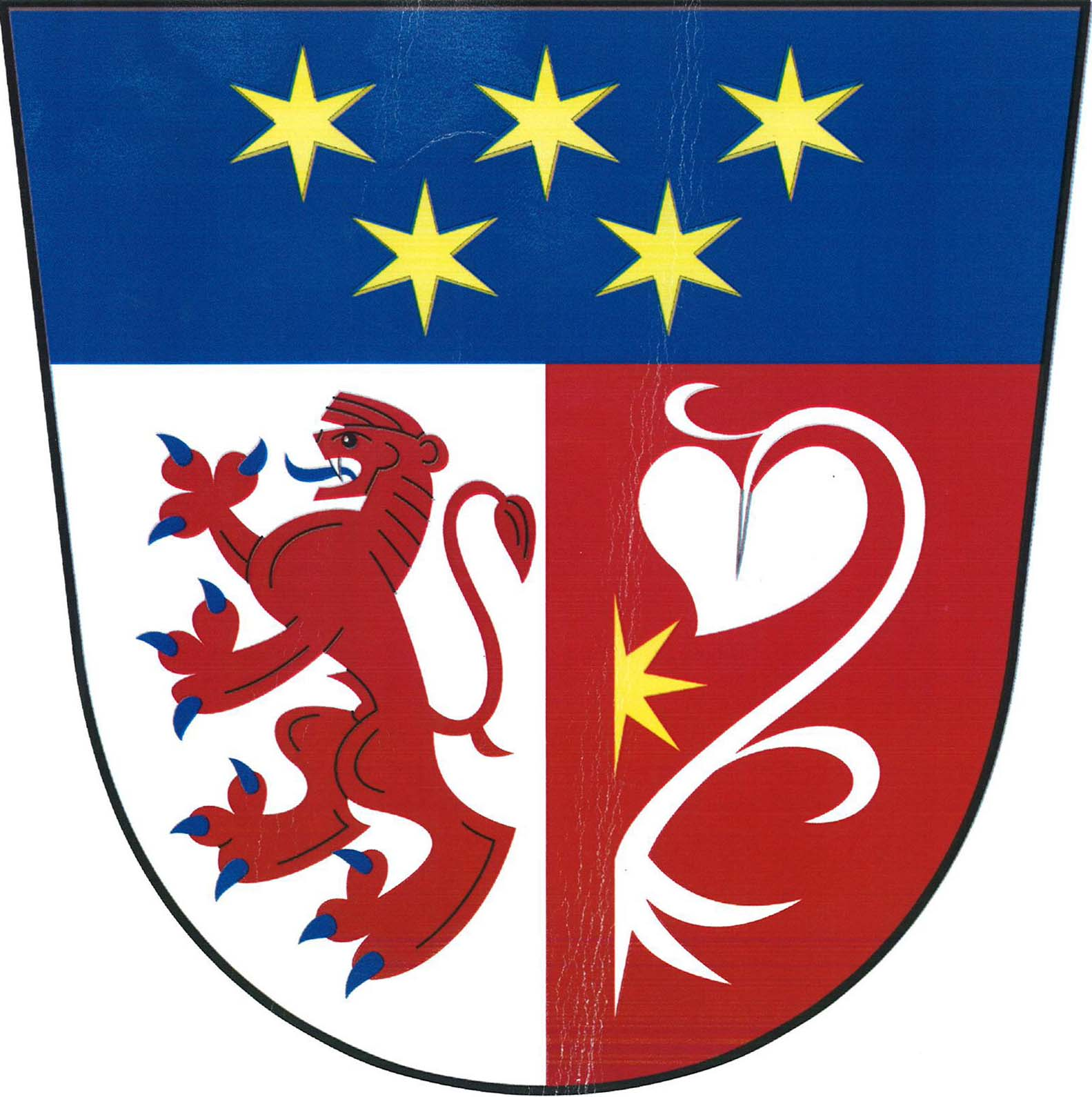
- Flag Coat of arms

- Location in the Czech Republic
- Coordinates: 50°14′8″N 14°0′59″E
- Country: Czech Republic
- Region: Central Bohemian
- District: Kladno
- First mentioned: 1250

Area
  - Total: 6.10 km^{2} (2.36 sq mi)
- Elevation: 300 m (980 ft)

Population (2026-01-01)
  - Total: 383
  - Density: 62.8/km^{2} (163/sq mi)
- Time zone: UTC+1 (CET)
  - Summer (DST): UTC+2 (CEST)
- Postal code: 273 79
- Website: www.libovice.cz

Libovice is a municipality and village in Kladno District in the Central Bohemian Region of the Czech Republic. It has about 400 inhabitants.

== Demographics ==
Historical population
Year	Pop.	±%
1869	601	—
1880	614	+2.2%
1890	527	−14.2%
1900	540	+2.5%
1910	531	−1.7%
1921	494	−7.0%
1930	453	−8.3%
1950	318	−29.8%
1961	307	−3.5%
1970	273	−11.1%
1980	246	−9.9%
1991	226	−8.1%
2001	229	+1.3%
2011	352	+53.7%
2021	373	+6.0%
Source: Censuses
