= Kladno District =

Kladno District Okres Kladno
- District
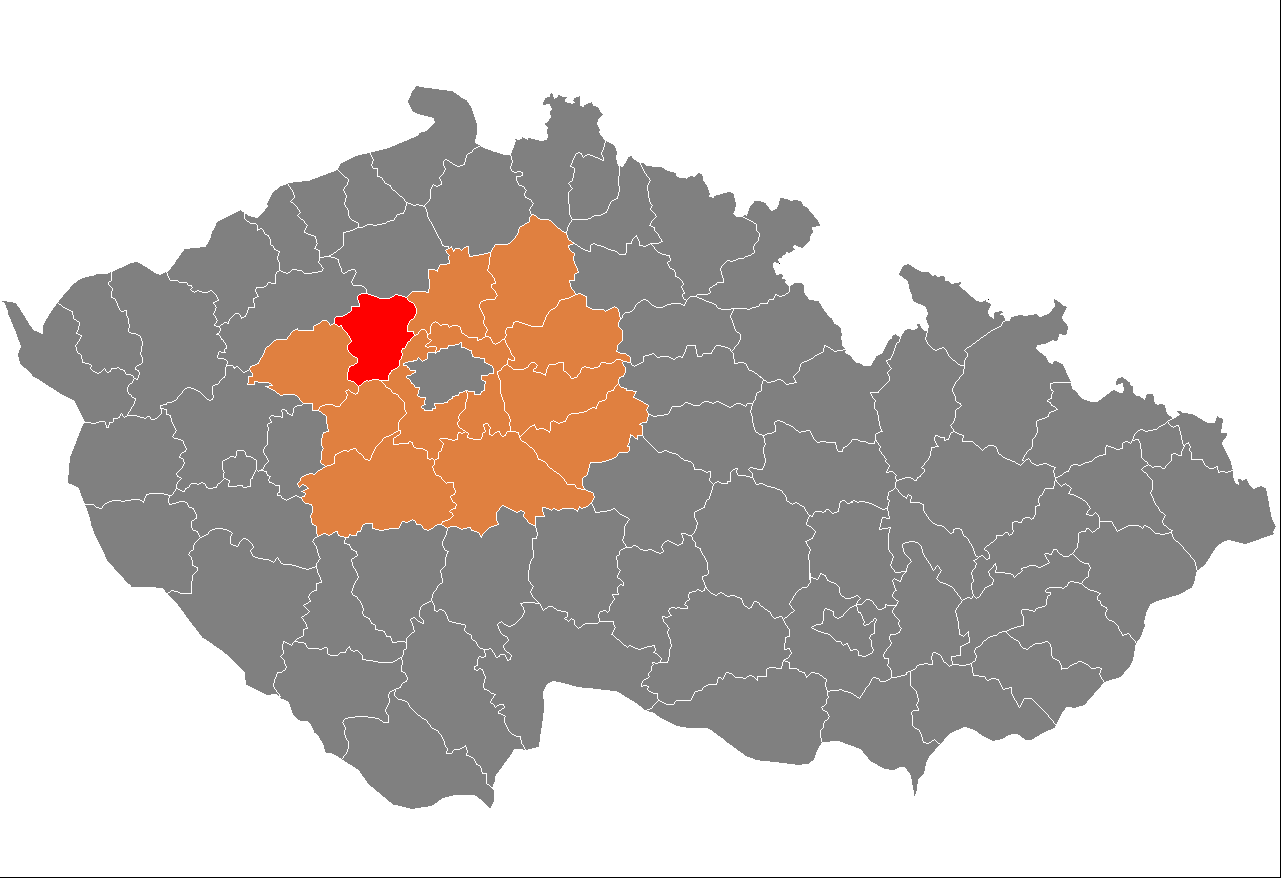
- Location in the Central Bohemian Region within the Czech Republic

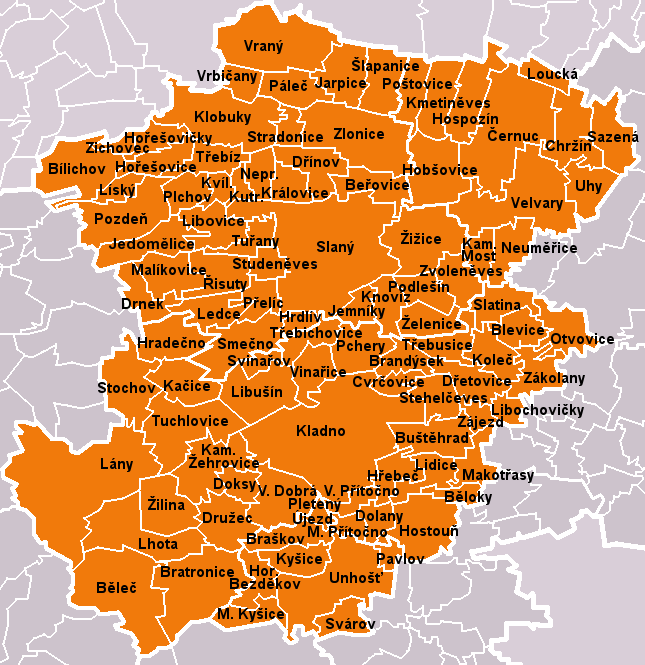
- Coordinates: 50°13′N 14°6′E
- Country: Czech Republic
- Region: Central Bohemian
- Capital: Kladno

Area
  - Total: 719.65 km^{2} (277.86 sq mi)

Population (2026)
  - Total: 172,388
  - Density: 239.54/km^{2} (620.42/sq mi)
- Time zone: UTC+1 (CET)
  - Summer (DST): UTC+2 (CEST)
- Municipalities: 100
- * Cities and towns: 8
- * Market towns: 2

Kladno District (Czech: okres Kladno) is a district in the Central Bohemian Region of the Czech Republic. Its capital is the city of Kladno.

== Administrative division ==
Kladno District is divided into two administrative districts of municipalities with extended competence: Kladno and Slaný.

=== List of municipalities ===
Cities and towns are marked in bold and market towns in italics:

Běleč - Běloky - Beřovice - Bílichov - Blevice - Brandýsek - Braškov - Bratronice - Buštěhrad - Černuc - Chržín - Cvrčovice - Doksy - Dolany - Drnek - Družec - Dřetovice - Dřínov - Hobšovice - Horní Bezděkov - Hořešovice - Hořešovičky - Hospozín - Hostouň - Hradečno - Hrdlív - Hřebeč - Jarpice - Jedomělice - Jemníky - Kačice - Kamenné Žehrovice - Kamenný Most - Kladno - Klobuky - Kmetiněves - Knovíz - Koleč - Královice - Kutrovice - Kvílice - Kyšice - Lány - Ledce - Lhota - Libochovičky - Libovice - Libušín - Lidice - Líský - Loucká - Makotřasy - Malé Kyšice - Malé Přítočno - Malíkovice - Neprobylice - Neuměřice - Otvovice - Páleč - Pavlov - Pchery - Pletený Újezd - Plchov - Podlešín - Poštovice - Pozdeň - Přelíc - Řisuty - Sazená - Slaný - Šlapanice - Slatina - Smečno - Stehelčeves - Stochov - Stradonice - Studeněves - Svárov - Svinařov - Třebichovice - Třebíz - Třebusice - Tuchlovice - Tuřany - Uhy - Unhošť - Velká Dobrá - Velké Přítočno - Velvary - Vinařice - Vraný - Vrbičany - Zájezd - Zákolany - Želenice - Zichovec - Žilina - Žižice - Zlonice - Zvoleněves

== Geography ==
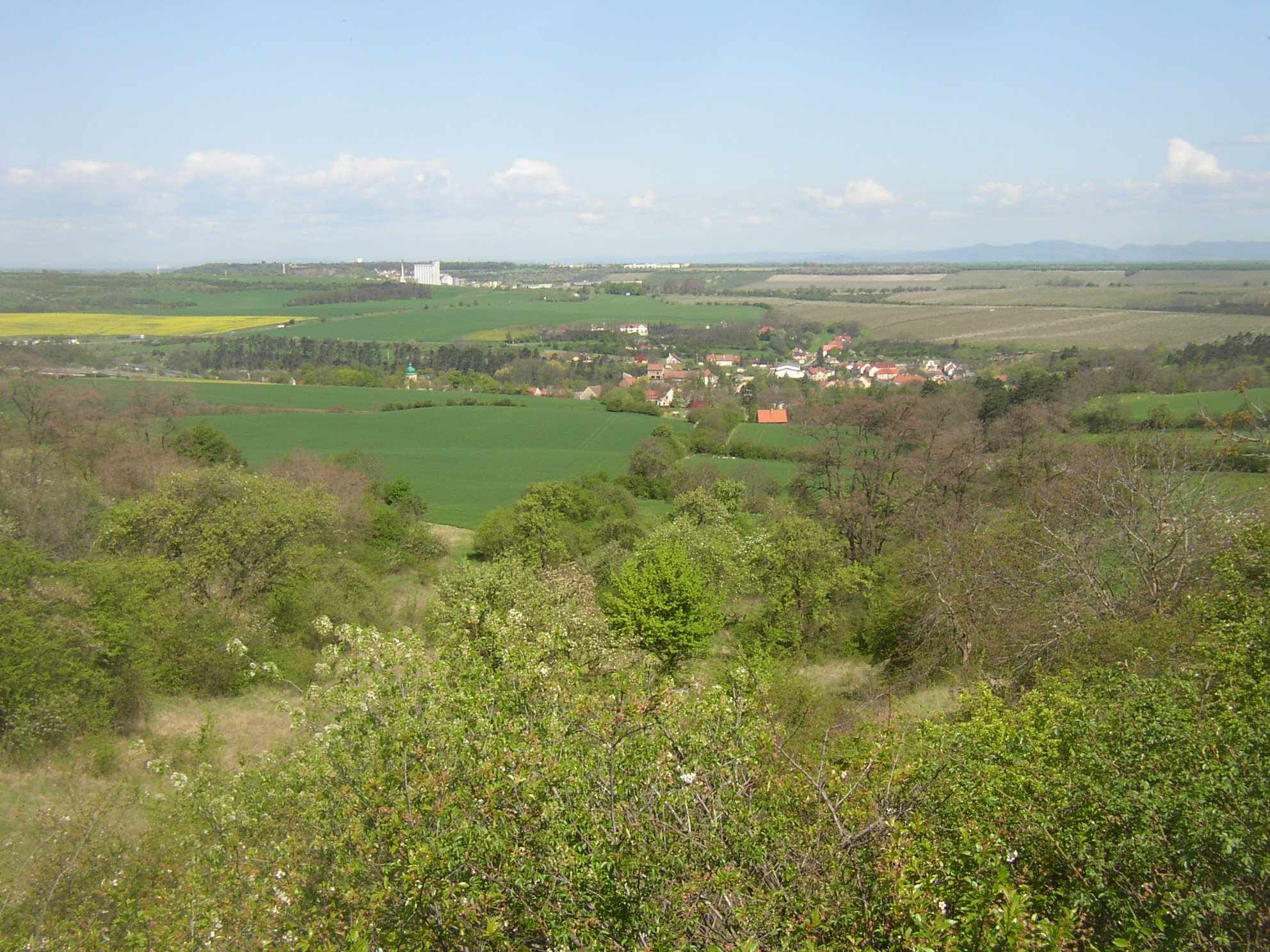
Landscape around Knovíz

The district is characterised by a rugged landscape without large differences in altitude, mostly flat in the north and east and hilly in the south and west. The territory extends into three geomorphological mesoregions: Lower Ohře Table (north), Prague Plateau (central and eastern part), Křivoklát Highlands (south) and Džbán (small part in the west). The highest point of the district is the hill Tuchonín in Malé Kyšice with an elevation of 488 m (1,601 ft) and the lowest point is the river bed of the Bakovský potok in Sazená at 172 m (564 ft).

From the total district area of 719.7 km^{2} (277.9 sq mi), agricultural land occupies 474.5 km^{2} (183.2 sq mi), forests occupy 145.9 km^{2} (56.3 sq mi), and water area occupies 7.3 km^{2} (2.8 sq mi). Forests cover 20.3% of the district's area.

There are no major rivers. The most important watercourses are the Loděnice River, which crosses the southern part of the district, and the Bakovský potok, which flows across the northern part and then joins the Vltava just beyond the district border. There are relatively many small fishponds in the area. The largest body of water is the fishpond Turyňský rybník with an area of 51 ha (130 acres). A notable body of water is also Klíčava Reservoir, which lies only partially in the district.

Křivoklátsko is the only protected landscape area that extends into the district, in its southwestern part.

== Demographics ==
Historical population

| Year | Pop. | ±% |
|---|---|---|
| 1869 | 84,808 | — |
| 1880 | 100,112 | +18.0% |
| 1890 | 116,635 | +16.5% |
| 1900 | 137,042 | +17.5% |
| 1910 | 153,716 | +12.2% |

| Year | Pop. | ±% |
|---|---|---|
| 1921 | 150,077 | −2.4% |
| 1930 | 154,276 | +2.8% |
| 1950 | 138,515 | −10.2% |
| 1961 | 148,196 | +7.0% |
| 1970 | 152,224 | +2.7% |

| Year | Pop. | ±% |
|---|---|---|
| 1980 | 155,792 | +2.3% |
| 1991 | 150,625 | −3.3% |
| 2001 | 151,360 | +0.5% |
| 2011 | 158,799 | +4.9% |
| 2021 | 166,771 | +5.0% |

Source: Censuses

=== Most populous municipalities ===
| Name | Population | Area (km^{2}) |
|---|---|---|
| Kladno | 69,728 | 37 |
| Slaný | 17,247 | 35 |
| Stochov | 5,362 | 10 |
| Unhošť | 5,324 | 17 |
| Buštěhrad | 4,073 | 8 |
| Libušín | 3,534 | 9 |
| Velvary | 3,147 | 18 |
| Tuchlovice | 2,785 | 13 |
| Brandýsek | 2,299 | 4 |
| Lány | 2,294 | 67 |

== Economy ==
The largest employers with headquarters in Kladno District and at least 1,000 employees are:

| Economic entity | Location | Number of employees | Main activity |
|---|---|---|---|
| Lego Production | Kladno | 3,000–3,999 | Manufacture of toys |
| Regional Hospital Kladno | Kladno | 1,500–1,999 | Health care |
| Fire and Rescue Service of the Central Bohemian Region | Kladno | 1,000–1,499 | Fire service activities |
| Medical rescue service of the Central Bohemian Region | Kladno | 1,000–1,499 | Health care |
| Linet | Slaný | 1,000–1,499 | Production of medical equipment |

== Transport ==
The D7 motorway from Prague to Chomutov, including the unfinished section, leads across the district. The D6 motorway from Prague to Karlovy Vary passes through the southern part of the district.

== Sights ==
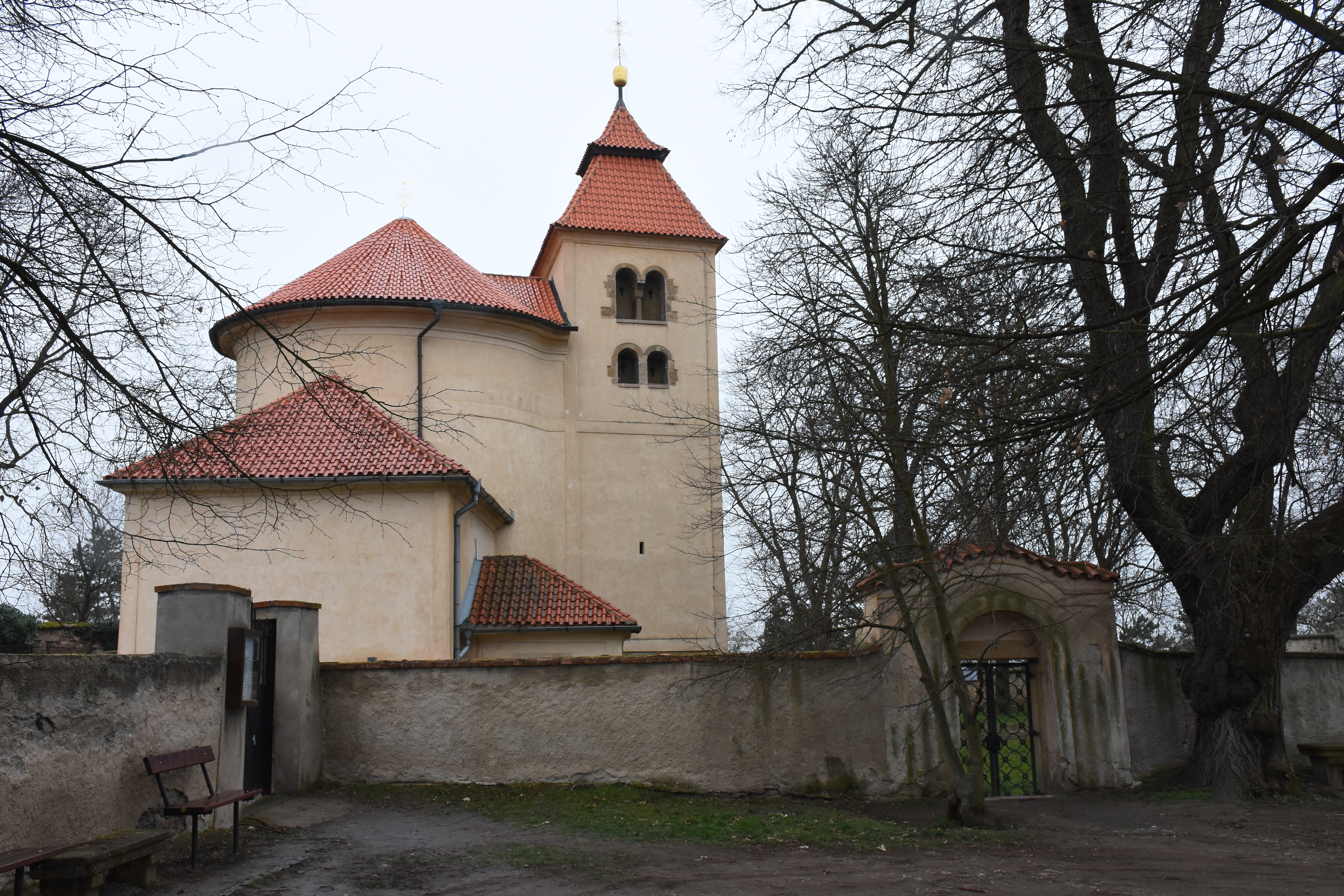
Budeč

The most important monuments in the district, protected as national cultural monuments, are:

- Lidice Memorial in Lidice
- Medieval gord of Budeč
- Tomb of Tomáš Garrigue Masaryk in Lány

The best-preserved settlements, protected as monument reservations and monument zones, are:

- Třebíz (monument reservation)
- Slaný
- Smečno
- Unhošť
- Velvary

The most visited tourist destination is the Lidice Memorial.
