= Pozdeň =

- Municipality
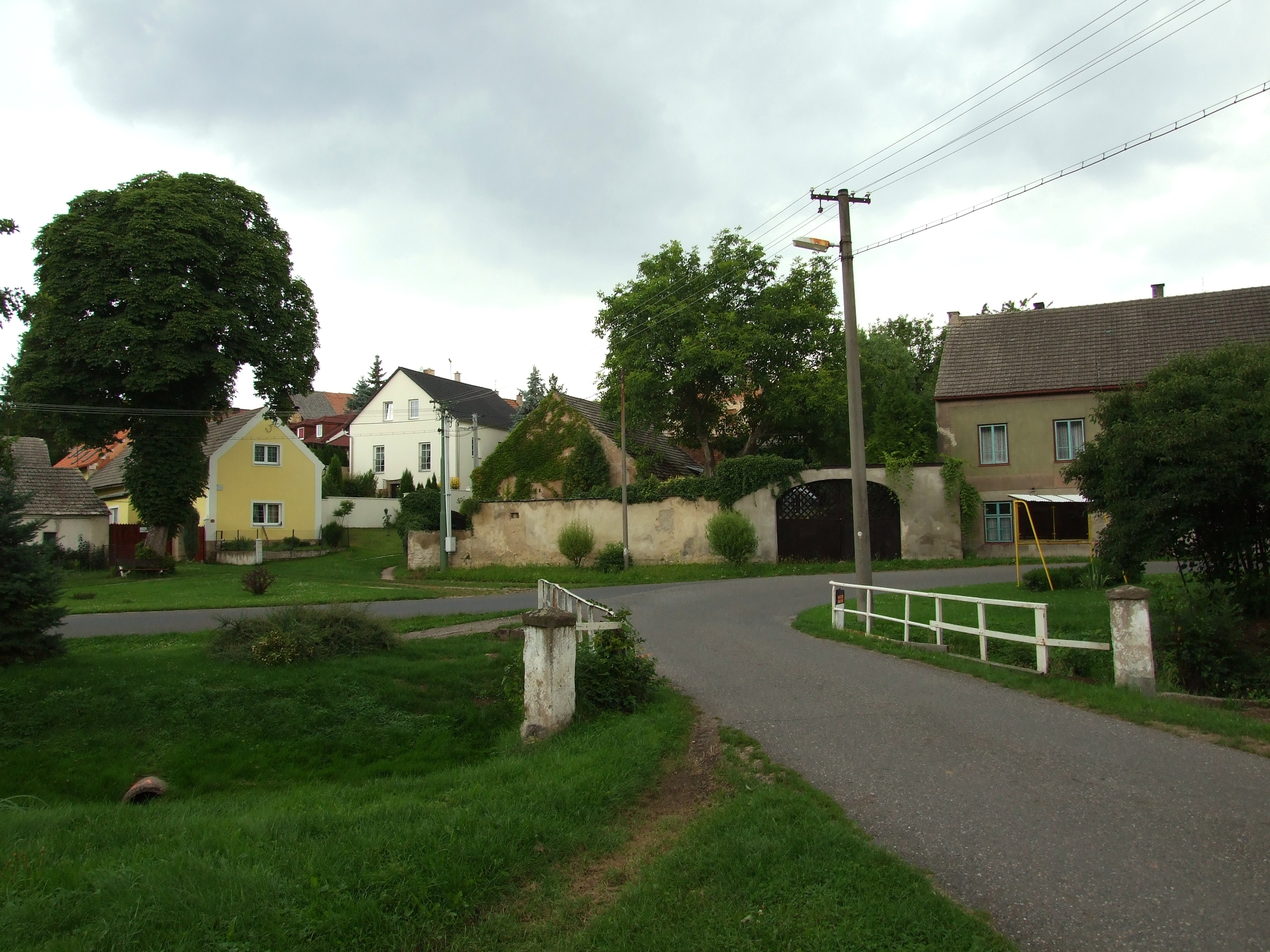
- Houses in Pozdeň

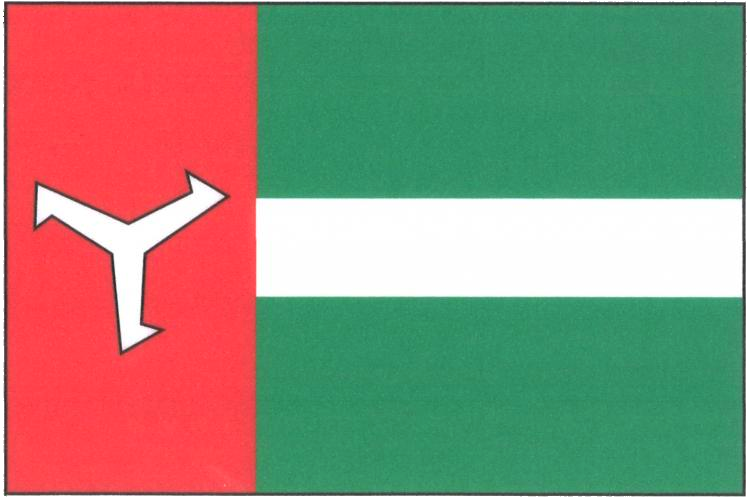
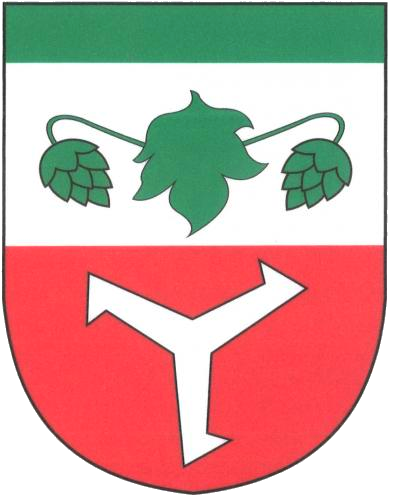
- Flag Coat of arms

- Location in the Czech Republic
- Coordinates: 50°14′32″N 13°56′37″E
- Country: Czech Republic
- Region: Central Bohemian
- District: Kladno
- First mentioned: 1321

Area
  - Total: 11.85 km^{2} (4.58 sq mi)
- Elevation: 332 m (1,089 ft)

Population (2026-01-01)
  - Total: 454
  - Density: 38.3/km^{2} (99.2/sq mi)
- Time zone: UTC+1 (CET)
  - Summer (DST): UTC+2 (CEST)
- Postal code: 273 76
- Website: www.obecpozden.cz

Pozdeň is a municipality and village in Kladno District in the Central Bohemian Region of the Czech Republic. It has about 500 inhabitants.

== Administrative division ==
Pozdeň consists of two municipal parts (in brackets population according to the 2021 census):

- Pozdeň (329)
- Hřešice (112)

== Demographics ==
Historical population
Year	Pop.	±%
1869	676	—
1880	684	+1.2%
1890	702	+2.6%
1900	703	+0.1%
1910	683	−2.8%
1921	699	+2.3%
1930	642	−8.2%
1950	520	−19.0%
1961	516	−0.8%
1970	475	−7.9%
1980	455	−4.2%
1991	392	−13.8%
2001	374	−4.6%
2011	456	+21.9%
2021	441	−3.3%
Source: Censuses
