= Jedomělice =

- Municipality
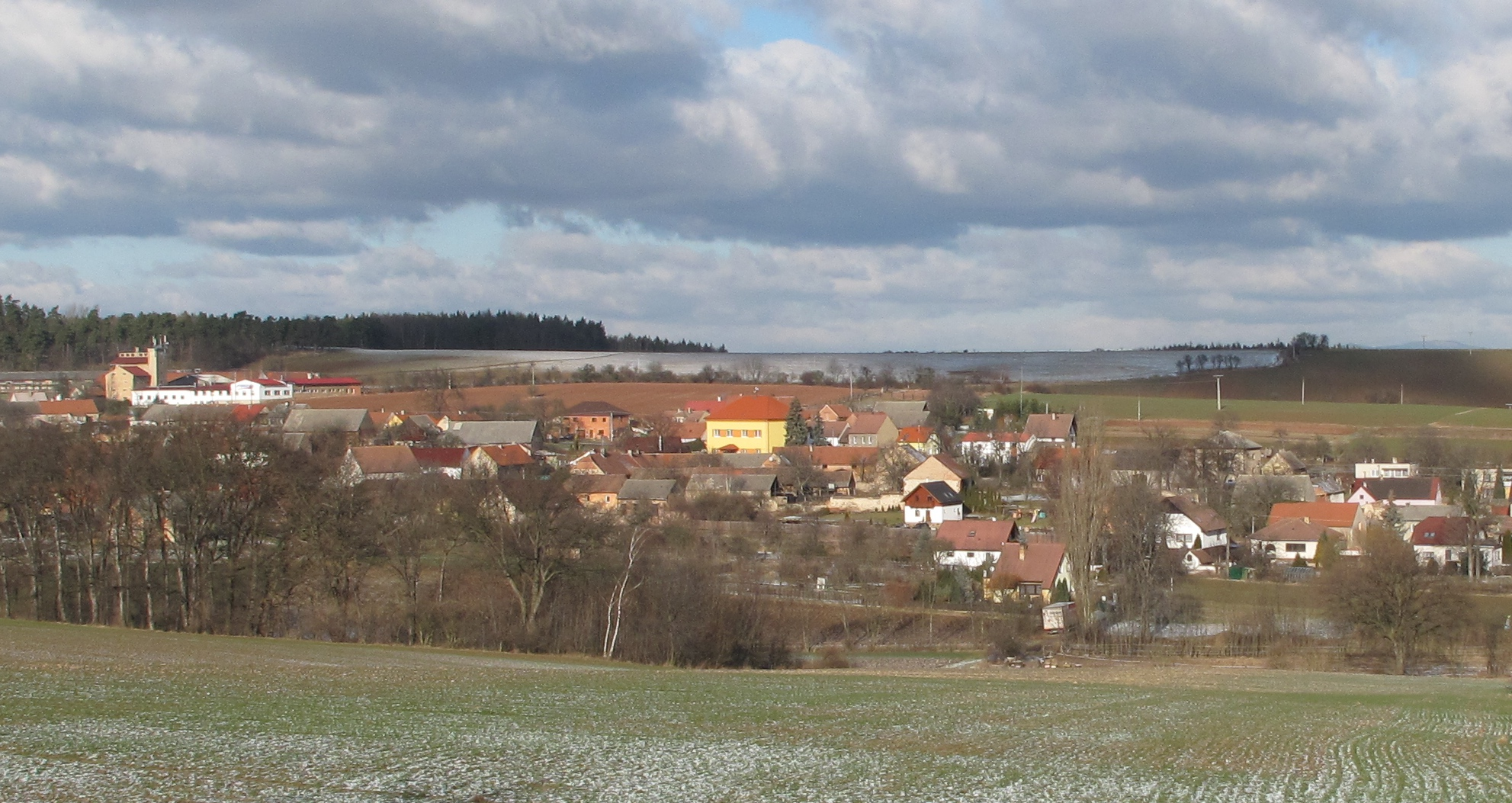
- View from the south

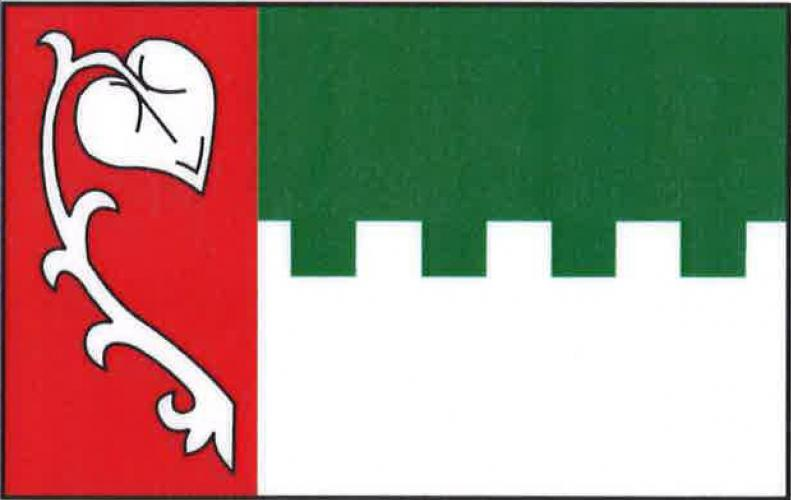
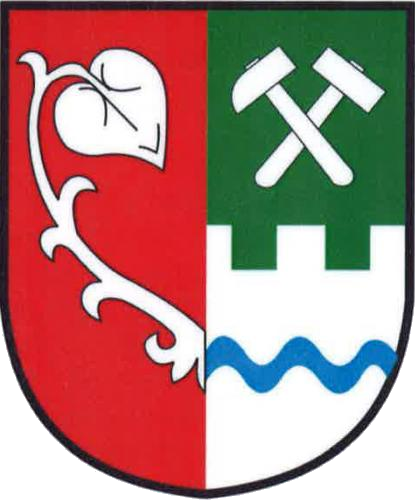
- Flag Coat of arms

- Location in the Czech Republic
- Coordinates: 50°13′59″N 13°58′21″E
- Country: Czech Republic
- Region: Central Bohemian
- District: Kladno
- First mentioned: 1316

Area
  - Total: 7.05 km^{2} (2.72 sq mi)
- Elevation: 330 m (1,080 ft)

Population (2026-01-01)
  - Total: 455
  - Density: 64.5/km^{2} (167/sq mi)
- Time zone: UTC+1 (CET)
  - Summer (DST): UTC+2 (CEST)
- Postal code: 273 78
- Website: www.obecjedomelice.cz

Jedomělice is a municipality and village in Kladno District in the Central Bohemian Region of the Czech Republic. It has about 500 inhabitants.

== Demographics ==
Historical population
Year	Pop.	±%
1869	464	—
1880	495	+6.7%
1890	456	−7.9%
1900	497	+9.0%
1910	589	+18.5%
1921	577	−2.0%
1930	556	−3.6%
1950	447	−19.6%
1961	429	−4.0%
1970	376	−12.4%
1980	339	−9.8%
1991	335	−1.2%
2001	332	−0.9%
2011	374	+12.7%
2021	441	+17.9%
Source: Censuses
