= Loucká =

- Municipality
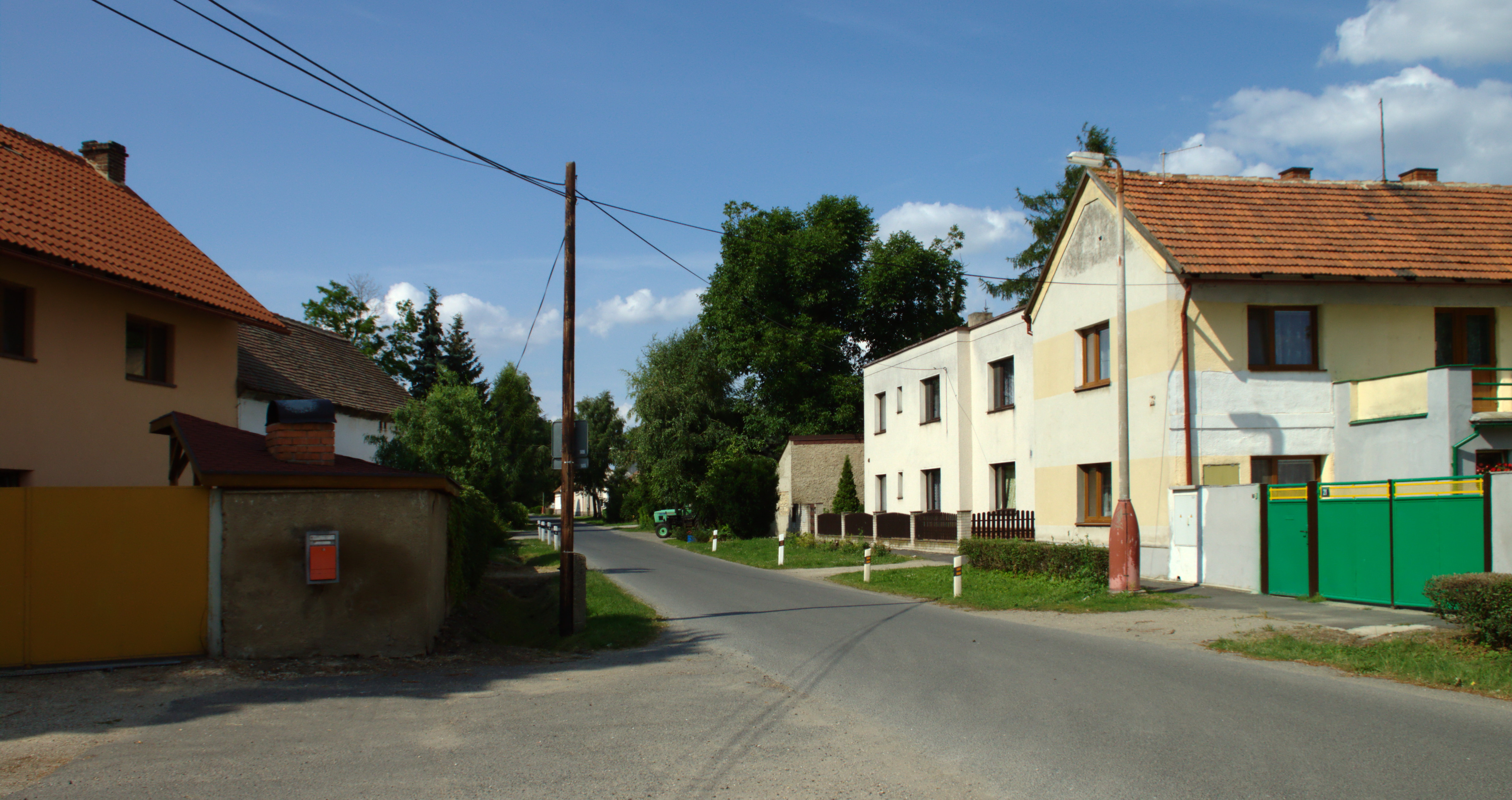
- A street in Loucká

- Location in the Czech Republic
- Coordinates: 50°19′39″N 14°14′21″E
- Country: Czech Republic
- Region: Central Bohemian
- District: Kladno
- First mentioned: 1720

Area
  - Total: 2.16 km^{2} (0.83 sq mi)
- Elevation: 231 m (758 ft)

Population (2026-01-01)
  - Total: 145
  - Density: 67.1/km^{2} (174/sq mi)
- Time zone: UTC+1 (CET)
  - Summer (DST): UTC+2 (CEST)
- Postal code: 273 24
- Website: www.ouloucka.cz

Loucká is a municipality and village in Kladno District in the Central Bohemian Region of the Czech Republic. It has about 100 inhabitants.

== Demographics ==
Historical population
Year	Pop.	±%
1869	91	—
1880	92	+1.1%
1890	99	+7.6%
1900	107	+8.1%
1910	121	+13.1%
1921	167	+38.0%
1930	199	+19.2%
1950	151	−24.1%
1961	166	+9.9%
1970	139	−16.3%
1980	141	+1.4%
1991	127	−9.9%
2001	133	+4.7%
2011	134	+0.8%
2021	137	+2.2%
Source: Censuses
