= Zichovec =

- Municipality
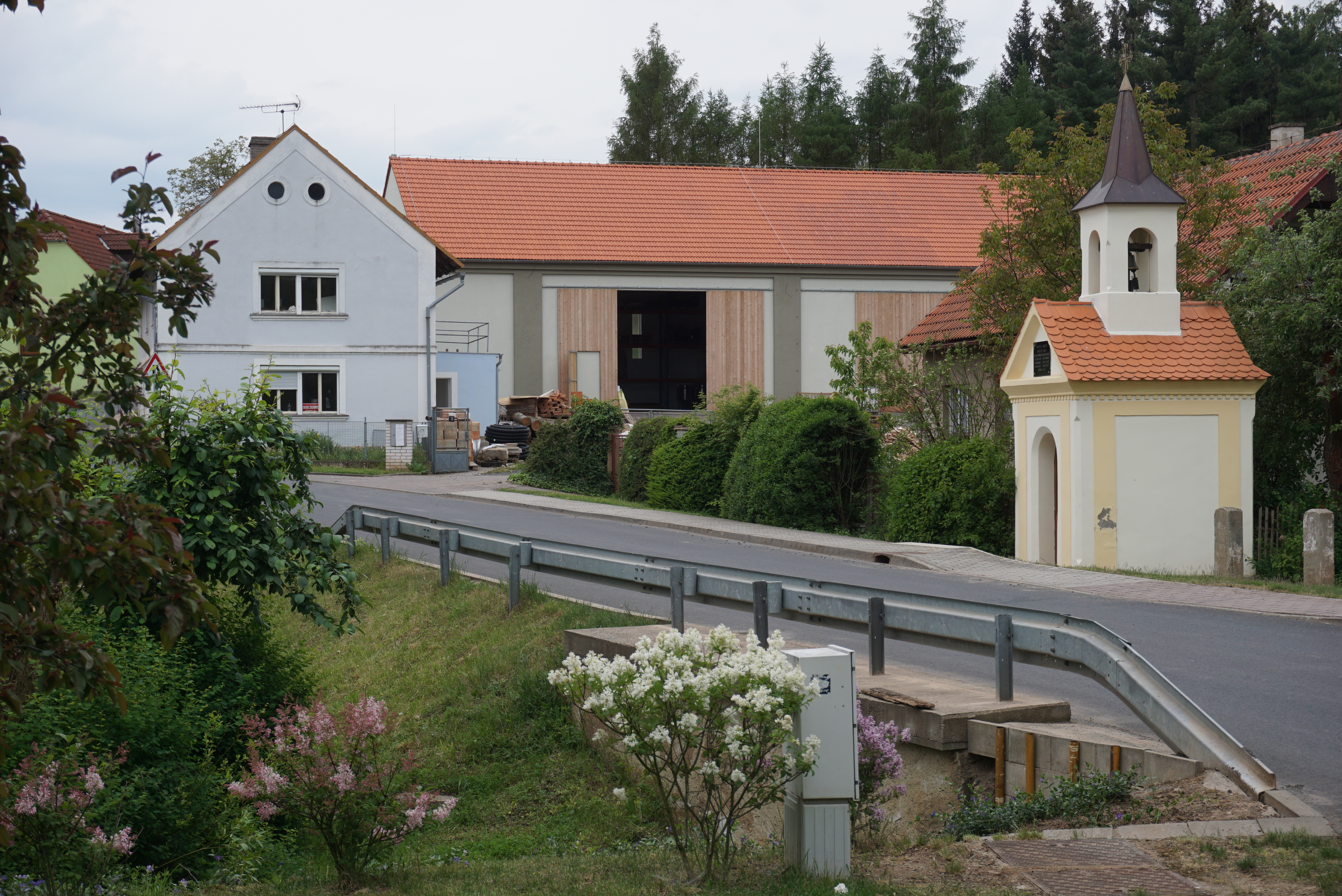
- Centre of Zichovec with a chapel

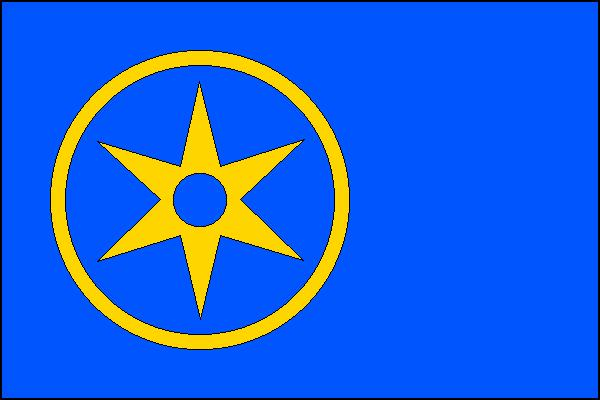
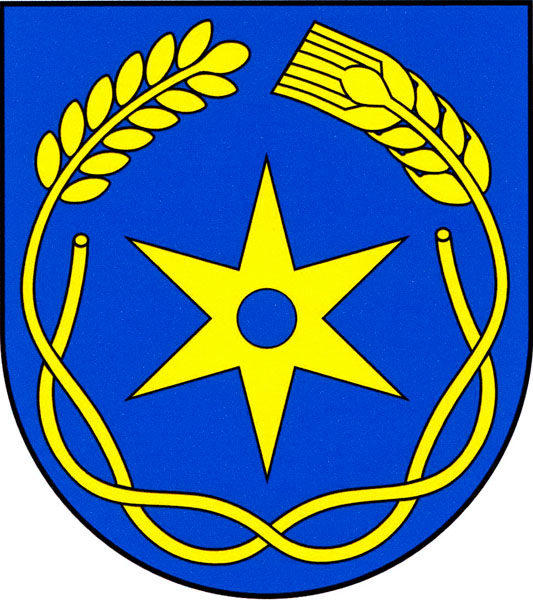
- Flag Coat of arms

- Location in the Czech Republic
- Coordinates: 50°16′16″N 13°55′34″E
- Country: Czech Republic
- Region: Central Bohemian
- District: Kladno
- First mentioned: 1407

Area
  - Total: 1.62 km^{2} (0.63 sq mi)
- Elevation: 340 m (1,120 ft)

Population (2026-01-01)
  - Total: 215
  - Density: 133/km^{2} (344/sq mi)
- Time zone: UTC+1 (CET)
  - Summer (DST): UTC+2 (CEST)
- Postal code: 273 74
- Website: www.zichovec.cz

Zichovec is a municipality and village in Kladno District in the Central Bohemian Region of the Czech Republic. It has about 200 inhabitants.

== Demographics ==
Historical population
Year	Pop.	±%
1869	157	—
1880	163	+3.8%
1890	180	+10.4%
1900	154	−14.4%
1910	163	+5.8%
1921	148	−9.2%
1930	176	+18.9%
1950	113	−35.8%
1961	130	+15.0%
1970	100	−23.1%
1980	87	−13.0%
1991	66	−24.1%
2001	76	+15.2%
2011	123	+61.8%
2021	213	+73.2%
Source: Censuses
