= Líský =

- Municipality
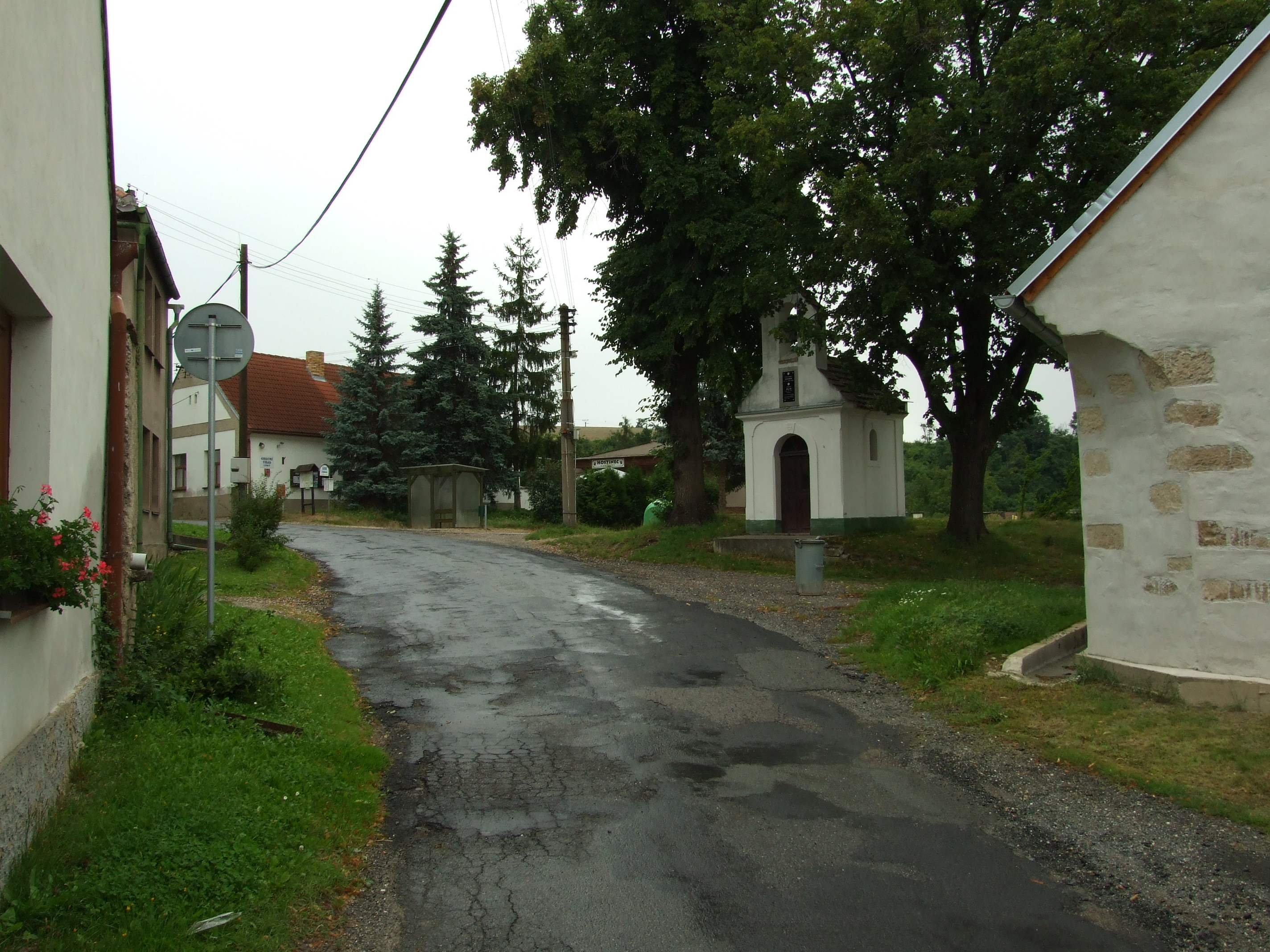
- Centre of Líský

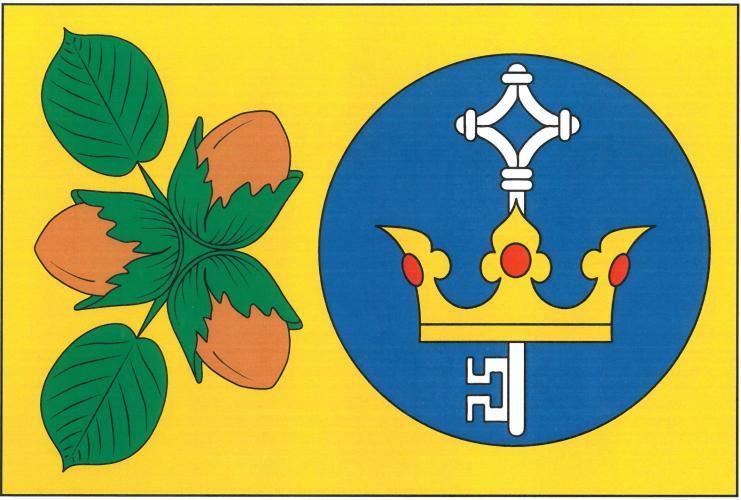
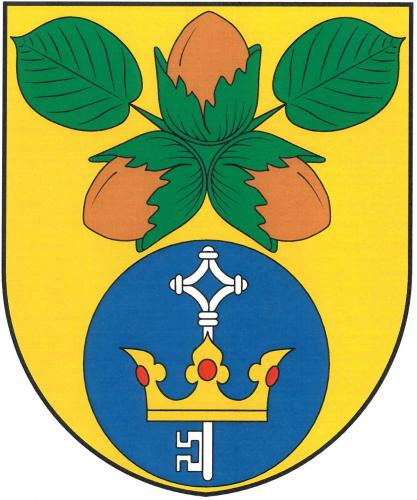
- Flag Coat of arms

- Location in the Czech Republic
- Coordinates: 50°15′2″N 13°55′44″E
- Country: Czech Republic
- Region: Central Bohemian
- District: Kladno
- First mentioned: 1616

Area
  - Total: 2.40 km^{2} (0.93 sq mi)
- Elevation: 375 m (1,230 ft)

Population (2026-01-01)
  - Total: 106
  - Density: 44.2/km^{2} (114/sq mi)
- Time zone: UTC+1 (CET)
  - Summer (DST): UTC+2 (CEST)
- Postal code: 273 76
- Website: www.obec-lisky.cz

Líský is a municipality and village in Kladno District in the Central Bohemian Region of the Czech Republic. It has about 100 inhabitants.

== Demographics ==
Historical population
Year	Pop.	±%
1869	215	—
1880	248	+15.3%
1890	233	−6.0%
1900	225	−3.4%
1910	266	+18.2%
1921	249	−6.4%
1930	243	−2.4%
1950	179	−26.3%
1961	168	−6.1%
1970	129	−23.2%
1980	112	−13.2%
1991	92	−17.9%
2001	69	−25.0%
2011	85	+23.2%
2021	106	+24.7%
Source: Censuses
