= Hořešovičky =

- Municipality
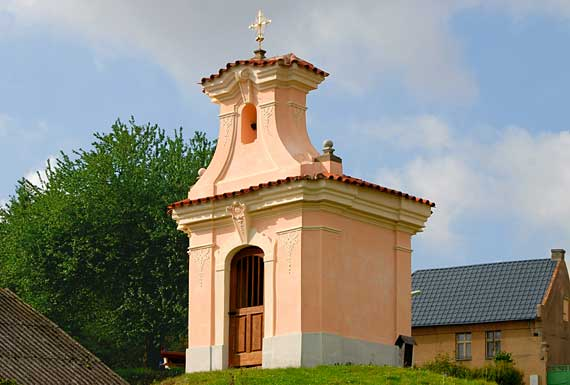
- Chapel in Hořešovičky

- Location in the Czech Republic
- Coordinates: 50°16′30″N 13°57′21″E
- Country: Czech Republic
- Region: Central Bohemian
- District: Kladno
- First mentioned: 1227

Area
  - Total: 3.71 km^{2} (1.43 sq mi)
- Elevation: 283 m (928 ft)

Population (2026-01-01)
  - Total: 148
  - Density: 39.9/km^{2} (103/sq mi)
- Time zone: UTC+1 (CET)
  - Summer (DST): UTC+2 (CEST)
- Postal code: 273 74
- Website: www.horesovicky.cz

Hořešovičky is a municipality and village in Kladno District in the Central Bohemian Region of the Czech Republic. It has about 100 inhabitants.

== Demographics ==
Historical population
Year	Pop.	±%
1869	279	—
1880	278	−0.4%
1890	260	−6.5%
1900	281	+8.1%
1910	289	+2.8%
1921	297	+2.8%
1930	258	−13.1%
1950	167	−35.3%
1961	160	−4.2%
1970	142	−11.3%
1980	156	+9.9%
1991	140	−10.3%
2001	115	−17.9%
2011	142	+23.5%
2021	132	−7.0%
Source: Censuses
