= Běloky =

- Municipality
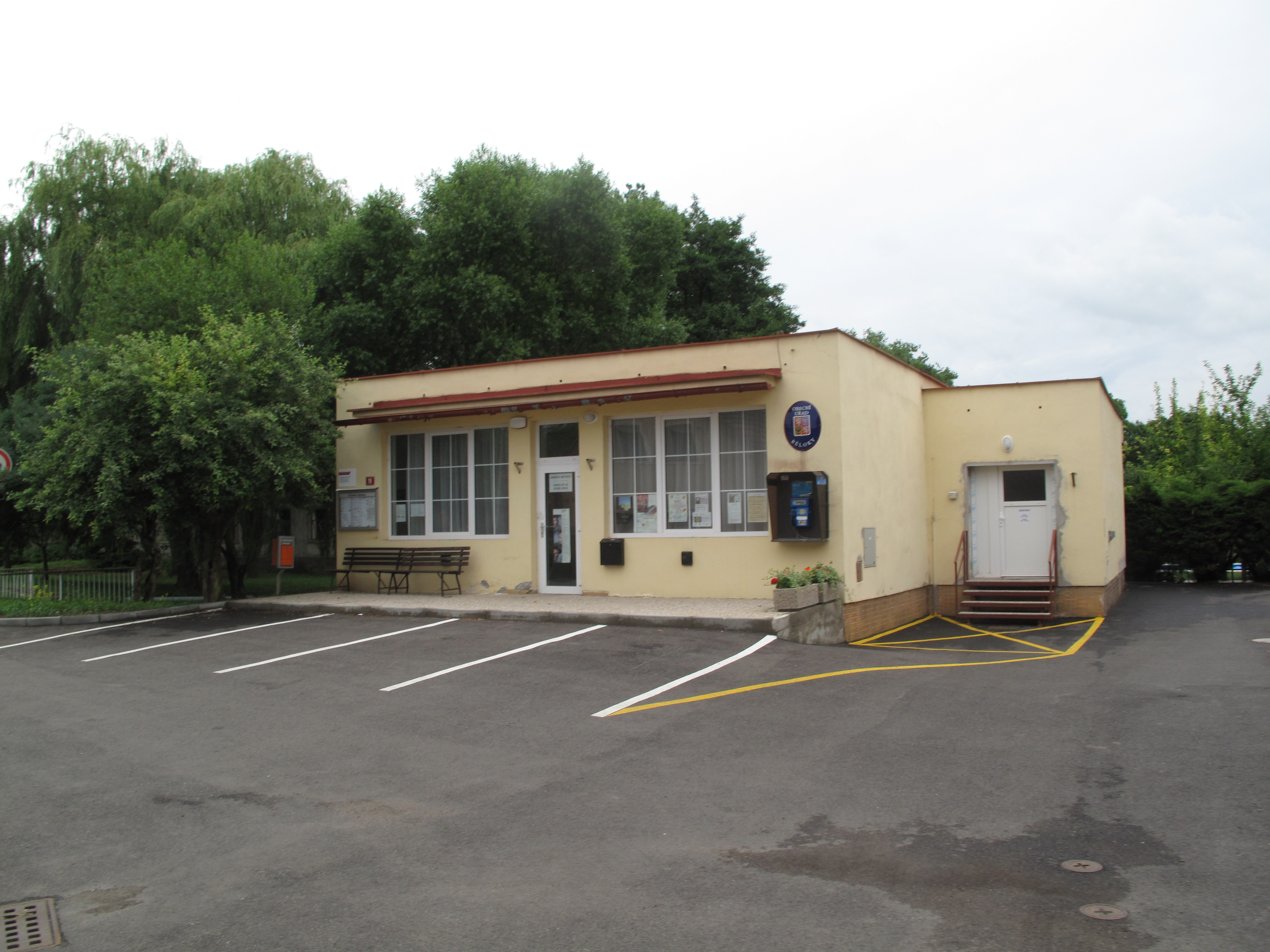
- Municipal office

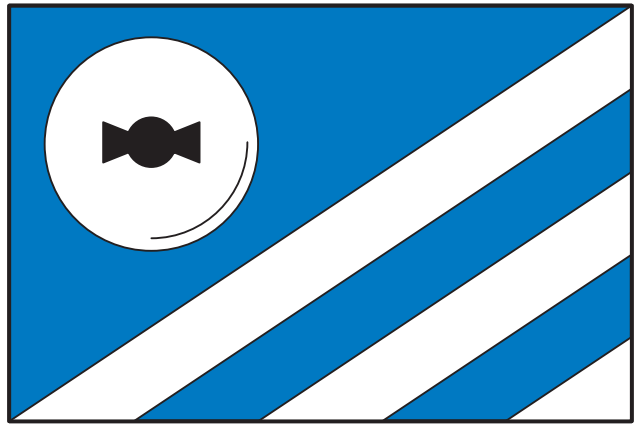
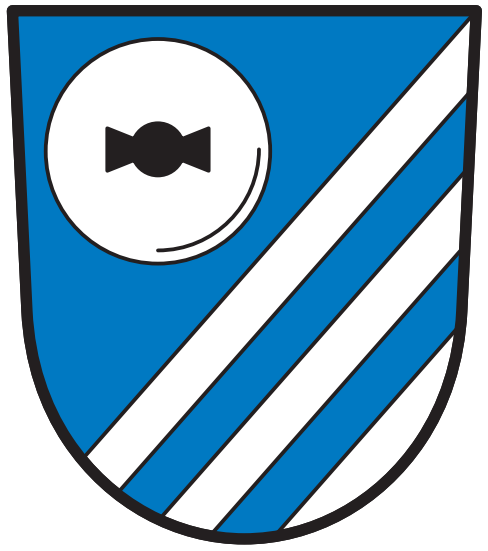
- Flag Coat of arms

- Location in the Czech Republic
- Coordinates: 50°7′53″N 14°13′15″E
- Country: Czech Republic
- Region: Central Bohemian
- District: Kladno
- First mentioned: 1257

Area
  - Total: 2.22 km^{2} (0.86 sq mi)
- Elevation: 308 m (1,010 ft)

Population (2026-01-01)
  - Total: 181
  - Density: 81.5/km^{2} (211/sq mi)
- Time zone: UTC+1 (CET)
  - Summer (DST): UTC+2 (CEST)
- Postal code: 273 53
- Website: www.obec-beloky.cz

Běloky is a municipality and village in Kladno District in the Central Bohemian Region of the Czech Republic. It has about 200 inhabitants.

== Demographics ==
Historical population
Year	Pop.	±%
1869	187	—
1880	225	+20.3%
1890	215	−4.4%
1900	239	+11.2%
1910	271	+13.4%
1921	245	−9.6%
1930	212	−13.5%
1950	174	−17.9%
1961	180	+3.4%
1970	188	+4.4%
1980	147	−21.8%
1991	134	−8.8%
2001	127	−5.2%
2011	188	+48.0%
2021	202	+7.4%
Source: Censuses
