= Podlešín =

- Municipality
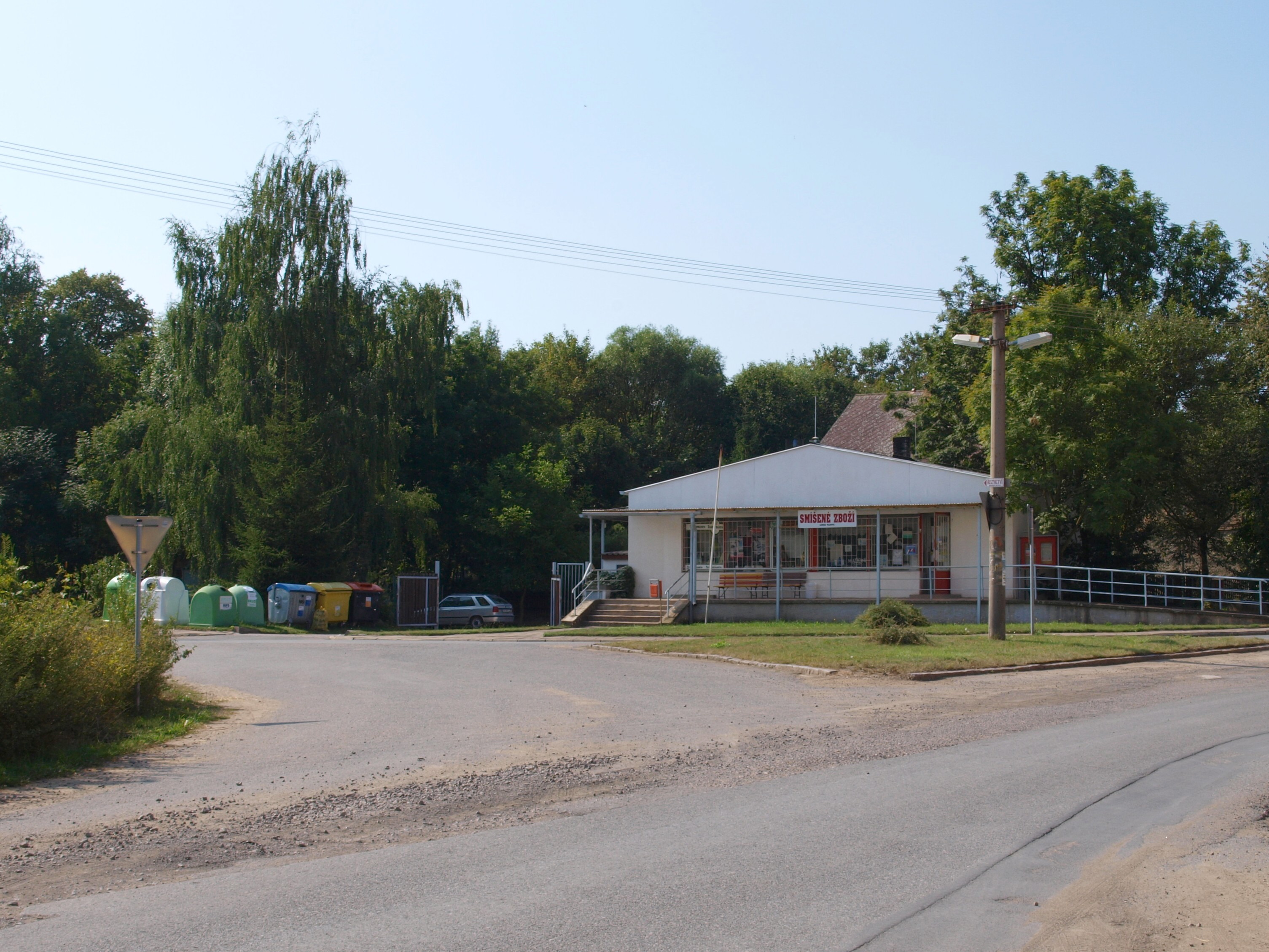
- Centre of Podlešín

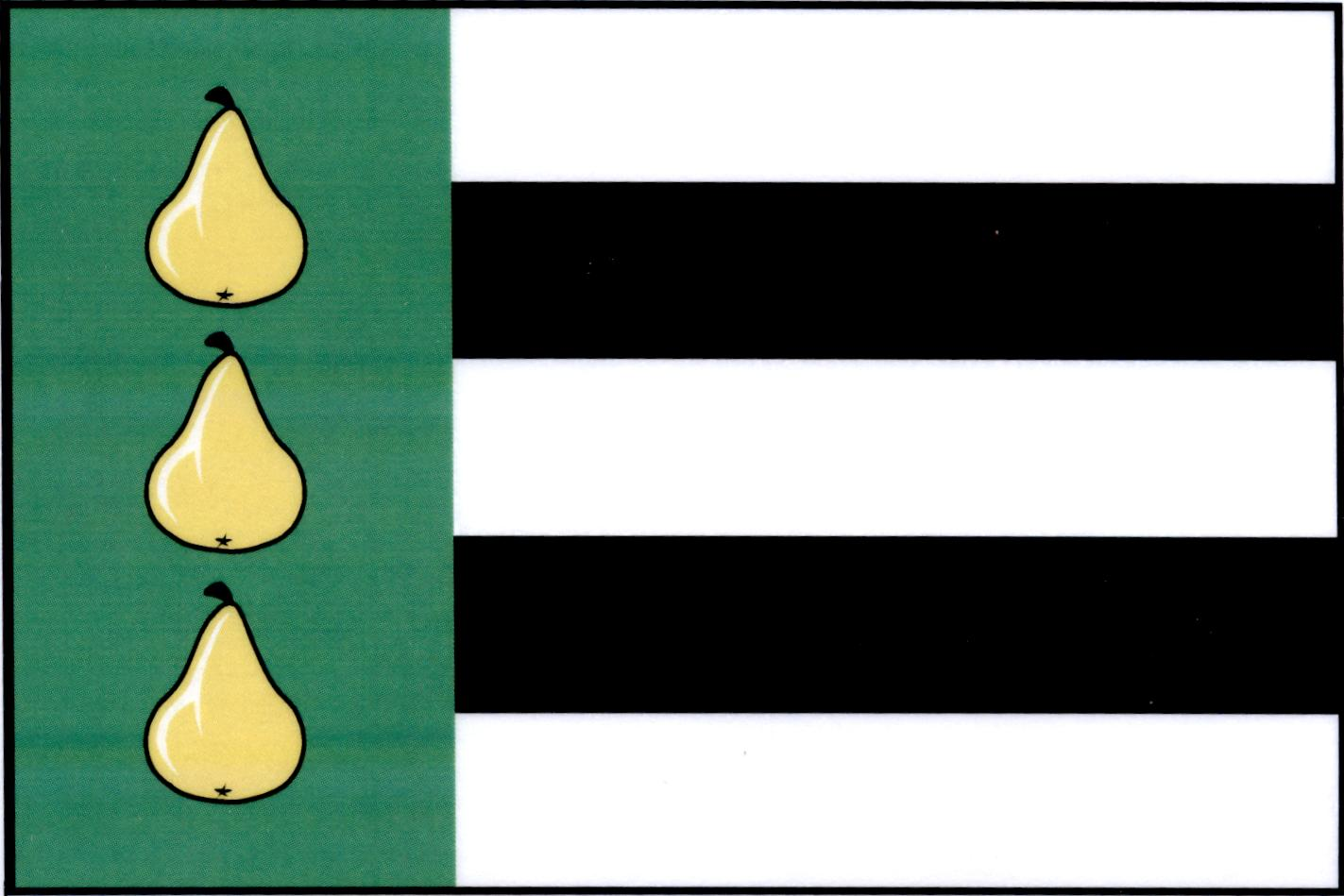
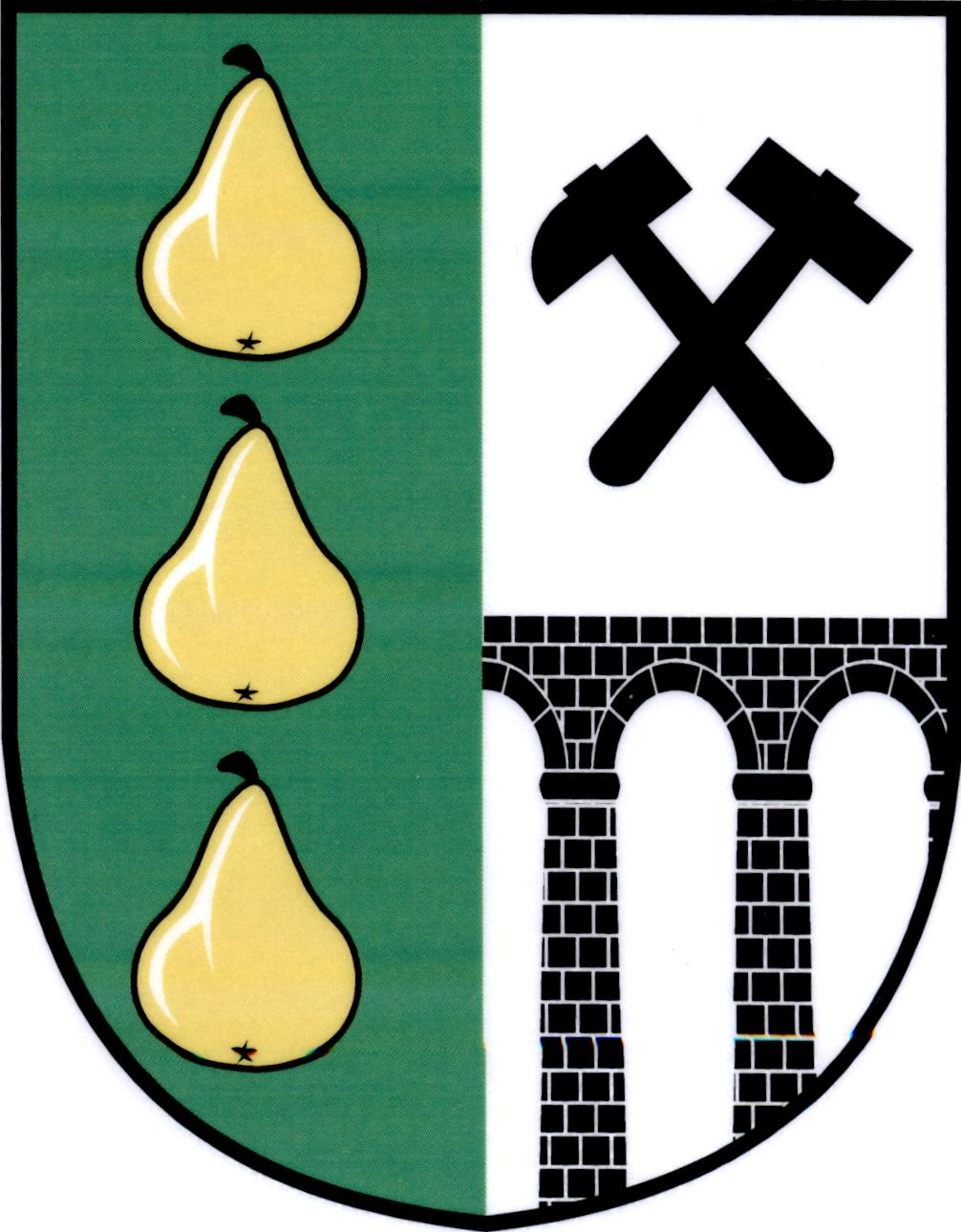
- Flag Coat of arms

- Location in the Czech Republic
- Coordinates: 50°13′16″N 14°9′37″E
- Country: Czech Republic
- Region: Central Bohemian
- District: Kladno
- First mentioned: 1052

Area
  - Total: 4.20 km^{2} (1.62 sq mi)
- Elevation: 225 m (738 ft)

Population (2026-01-01)
  - Total: 382
  - Density: 91.0/km^{2} (236/sq mi)
- Time zone: UTC+1 (CET)
  - Summer (DST): UTC+2 (CEST)
- Postal code: 273 25
- Website: www.podlesin.eu

Podlešín is a municipality and village in Kladno District in the Central Bohemian Region of the Czech Republic. It has about 400 inhabitants.

== Demographics ==
Historical population
| Year | Pop. | ±% |
|---|---|---|
| 1869 | 470 | — |
| 1880 | 594 | +26.4% |
| 1890 | 597 | +0.5% |
| 1900 | 600 | +0.5% |
| 1910 | 611 | +1.8% |
| 1921 | 567 | −7.2% |
| 1930 | 631 | +11.3% |
| 1950 | 457 | −27.6% |
| 1961 | 417 | −8.8% |
| 1970 | 386 | −7.4% |
| 1980 | 297 | −23.1% |
| 1991 | 281 | −5.4% |
| 2001 | 297 | +5.7% |
| 2011 | 300 | +1.0% |
| 2021 | 342 | +14.0% |
Source: Censuses
