= Řisuty =

- Municipality
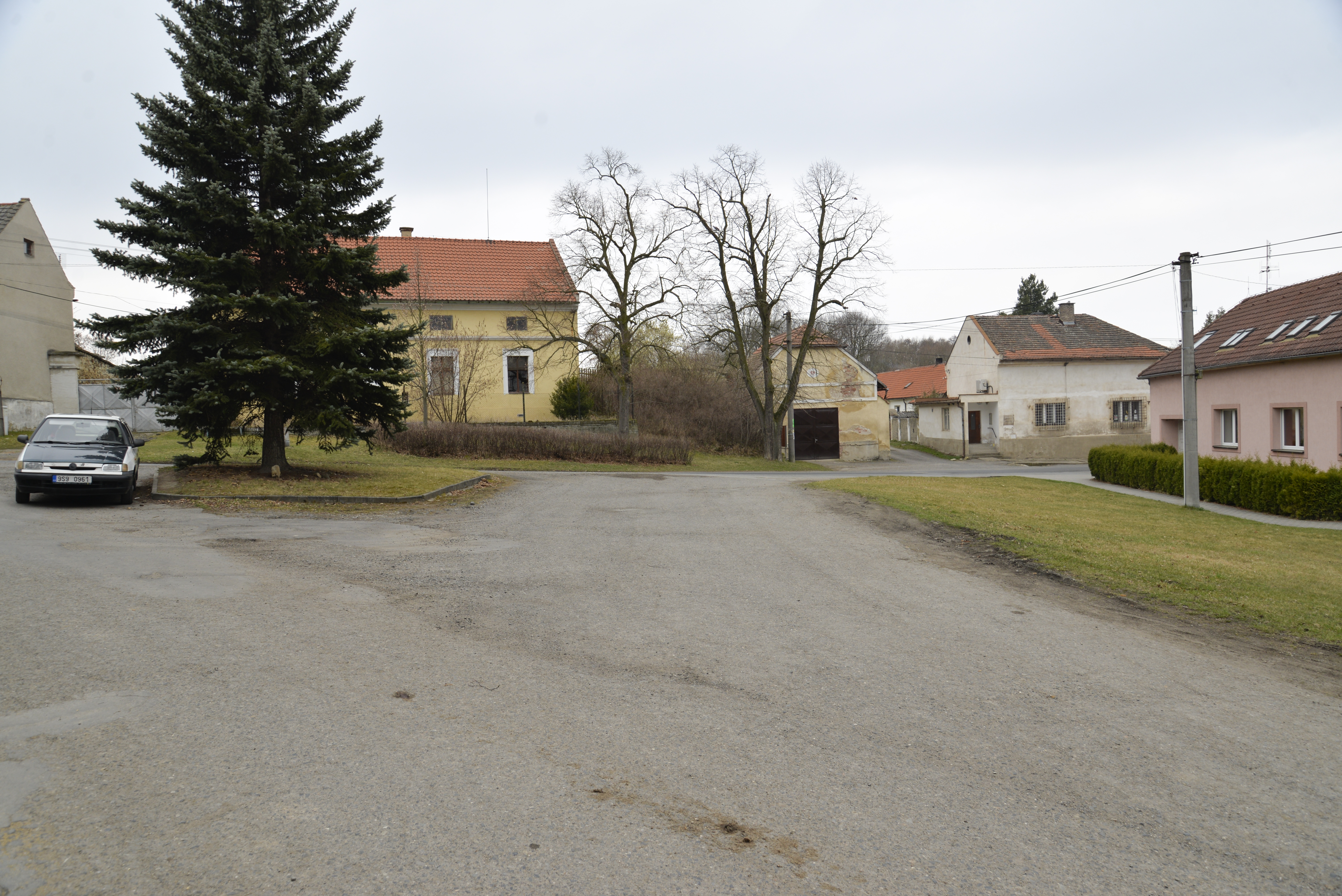
- Centre of Řisuty

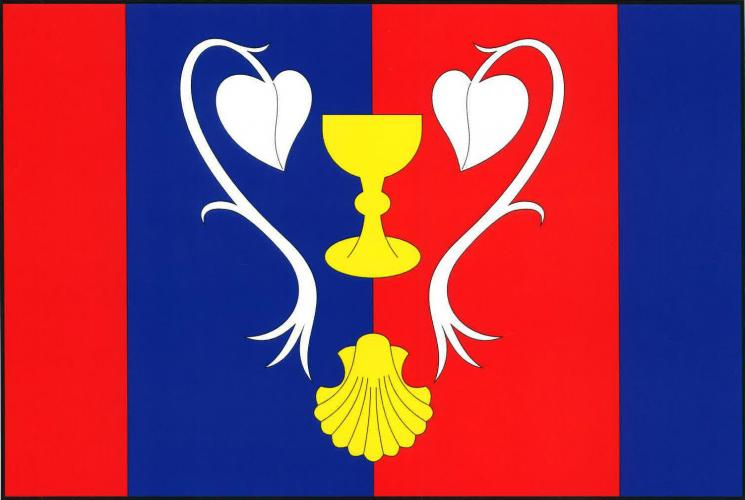
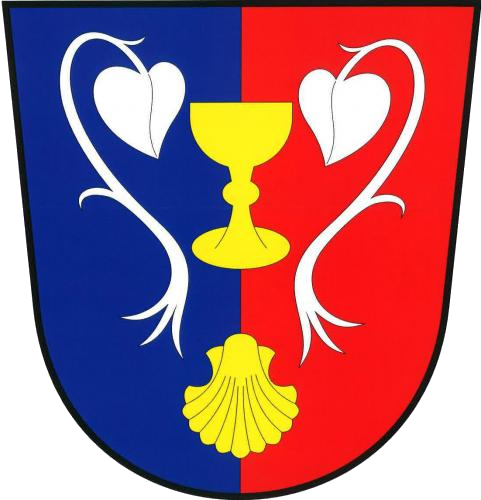
- Flag Coat of arms

- Location in the Czech Republic
- Coordinates: 50°13′0″N 14°0′18″E
- Country: Czech Republic
- Region: Central Bohemian
- District: Kladno
- First mentioned: 1316

Area
  - Total: 6.12 km^{2} (2.36 sq mi)
- Elevation: 310 m (1,020 ft)

Population (2026-01-01)
  - Total: 446
  - Density: 72.9/km^{2} (189/sq mi)
- Time zone: UTC+1 (CET)
  - Summer (DST): UTC+2 (CEST)
- Postal code: 273 78
- Website: www.risuty.cz

Řisuty (German: Risut) is a municipality and village in Kladno District in the Central Bohemian Region of the Czech Republic. It has about 400 inhabitants.

== Demographics ==
Historical population
| Year | Pop. | ±% |
|---|---|---|
| 1869 | 564 | — |
| 1880 | 605 | +7.3% |
| 1890 | 616 | +1.8% |
| 1900 | 623 | +1.1% |
| 1910 | 692 | +11.1% |
| 1921 | 664 | −4.0% |
| 1930 | 578 | −13.0% |
| 1950 | 463 | −19.9% |
| 1961 | 464 | +0.2% |
| 1970 | 389 | −16.2% |
| 1980 | 352 | −9.5% |
| 1991 | 292 | −17.0% |
| 2001 | 287 | −1.7% |
| 2011 | 302 | +5.2% |
| 2021 | 359 | +18.9% |
Source: Censuses
