= Hobšovice =

- Municipality
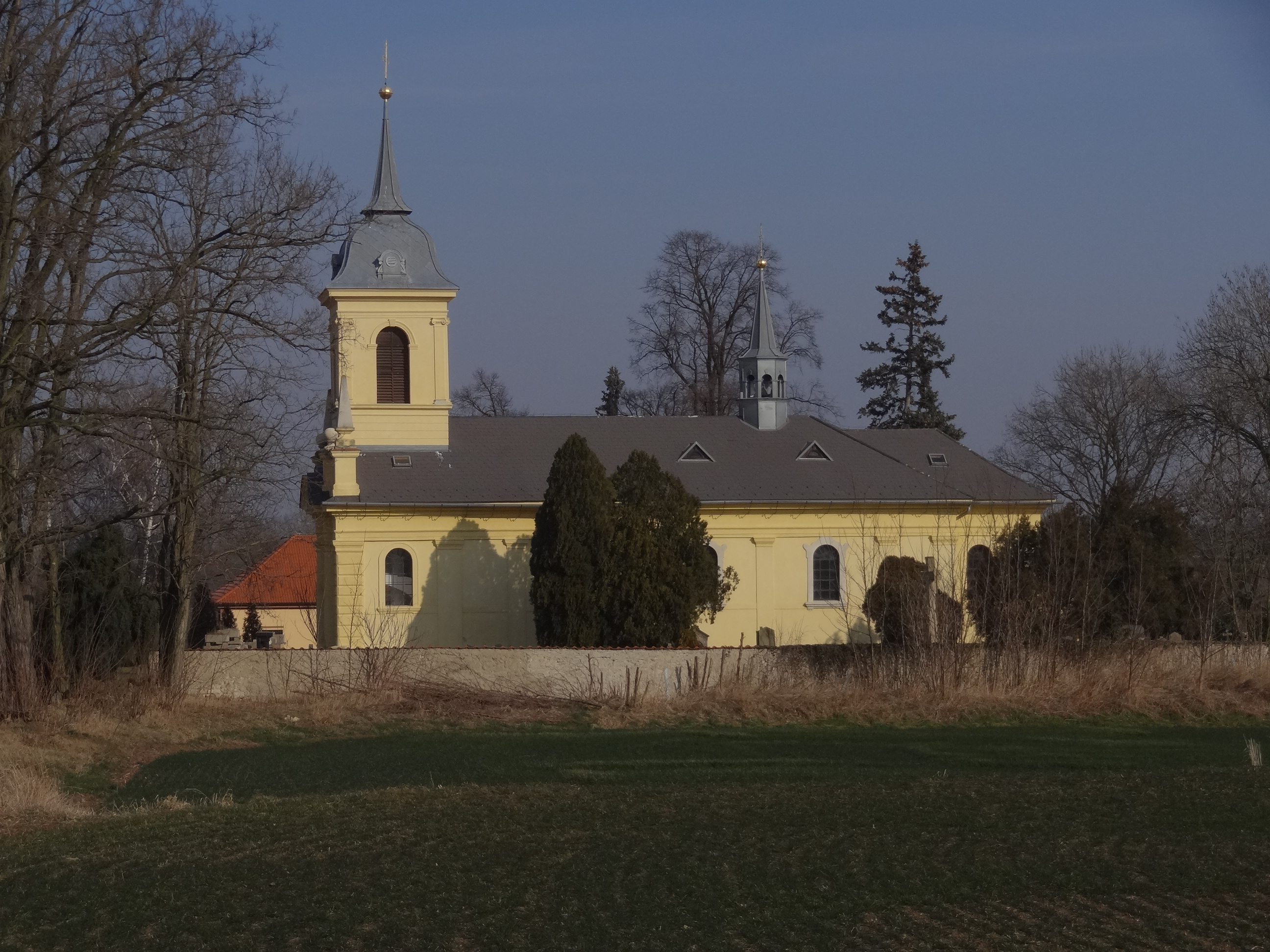
- Church of Saint Wenceslaus

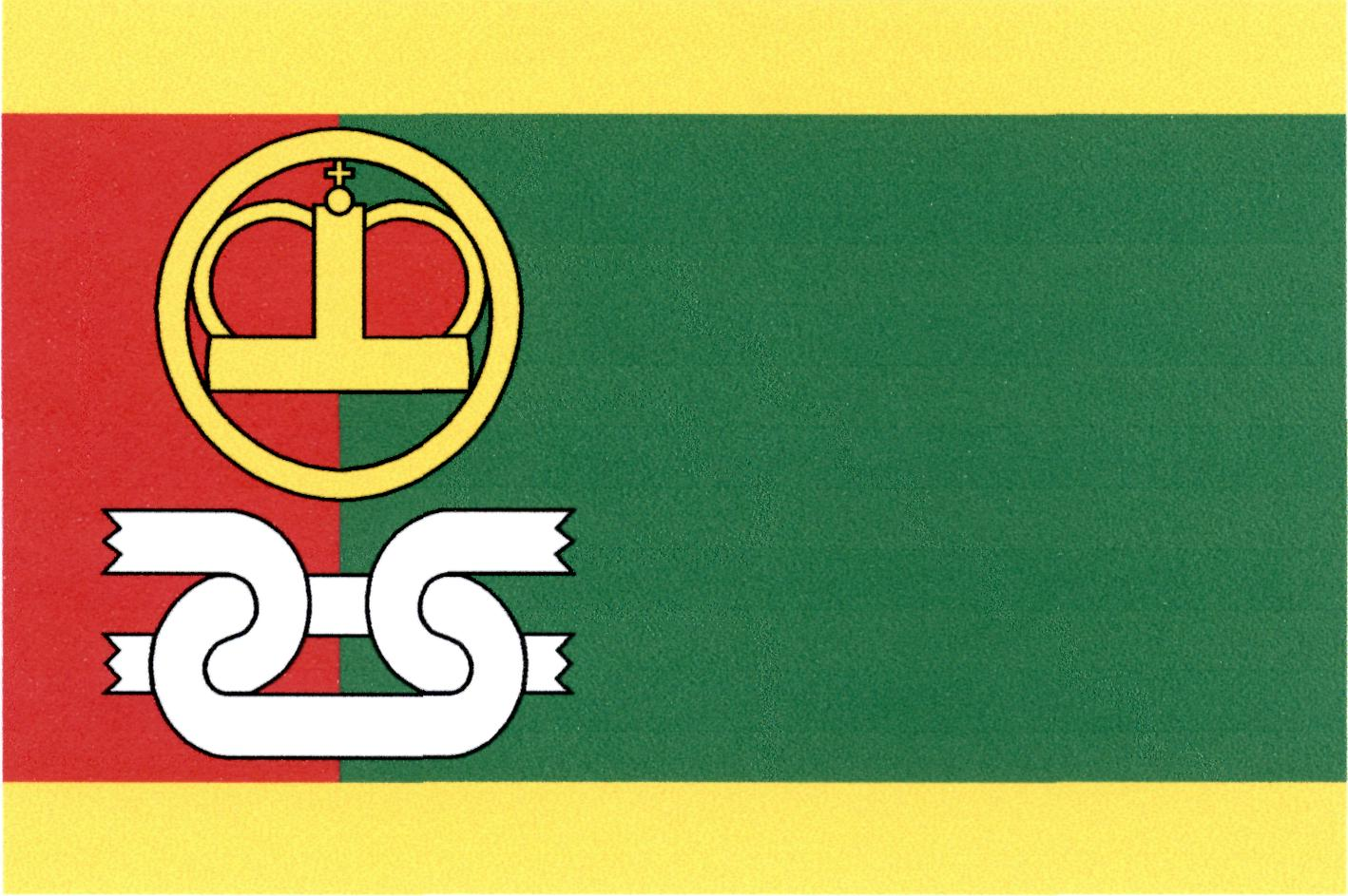
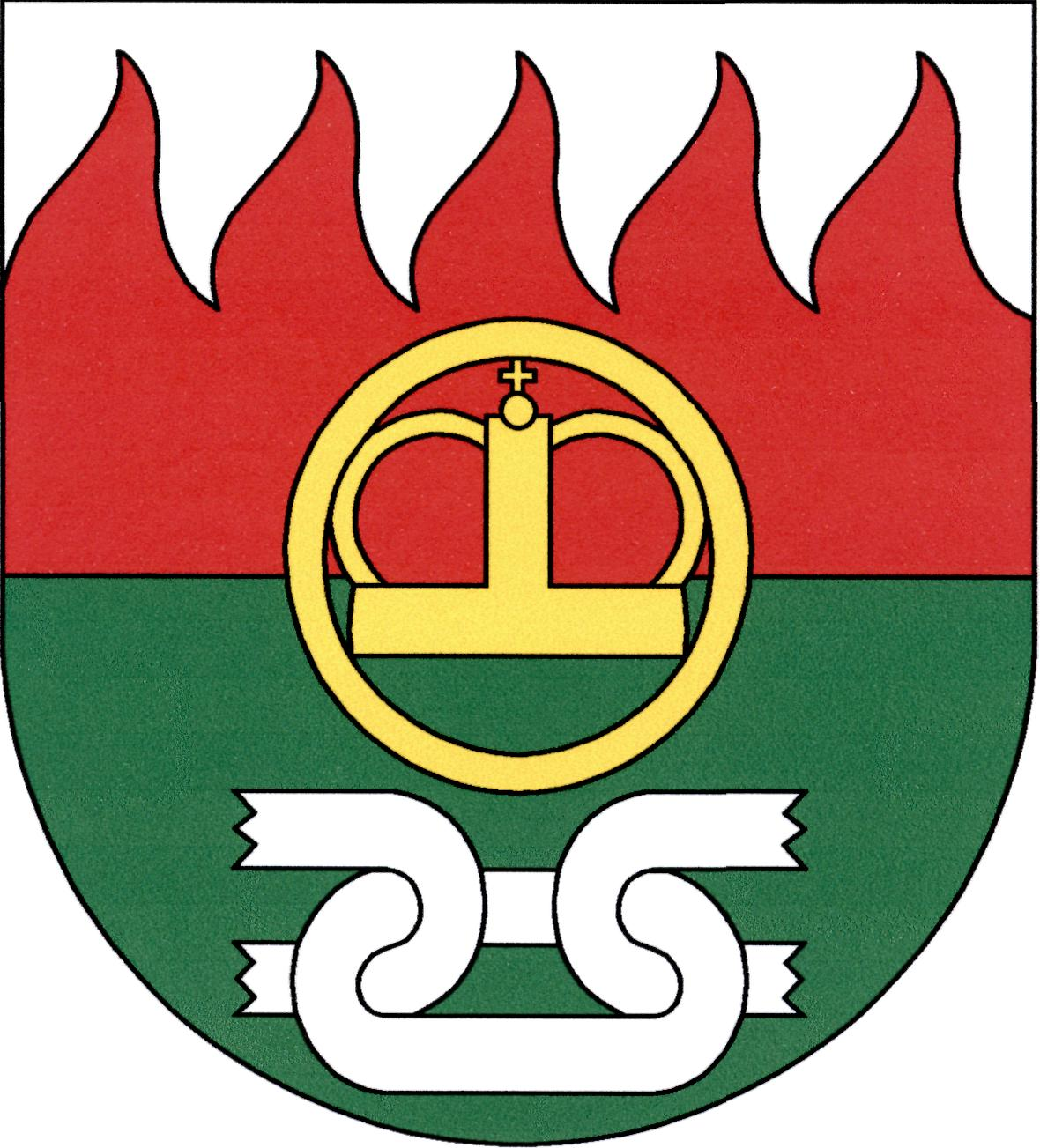
- Flag Coat of arms

- Location in the Czech Republic
- Coordinates: 50°16′14″N 14°9′44″E
- Country: Czech Republic
- Region: Central Bohemian
- District: Kladno
- First mentioned: 1185

Area
  - Total: 9.89 km^{2} (3.82 sq mi)
- Elevation: 210 m (690 ft)

Population (2026-01-01)
  - Total: 349
  - Density: 35.3/km^{2} (91.4/sq mi)
- Time zone: UTC+1 (CET)
  - Summer (DST): UTC+2 (CEST)
- Postal code: 273 21
- Website: www.hobsovice.cz

Hobšovice is a municipality and village in Kladno District in the Central Bohemian Region of the Czech Republic. It has about 300 inhabitants.

== Administrative division ==
Hobšovice consists of two municipal parts (in brackets population according to the 2021 census):

- Hobšovice (198)
- Skůry (150)

== Demographics ==
Historical population
Year	Pop.	±%
1869	709	—
1880	778	+9.7%
1890	791	+1.7%
1900	765	−3.3%
1910	682	−10.8%
1921	719	+5.4%
1930	614	−14.6%
1950	376	−38.8%
1961	397	+5.6%
1970	386	−2.8%
1980	286	−25.9%
1991	296	+3.5%
2001	320	+8.1%
2011	338	+5.6%
2021	348	+3.0%
Source: Censuses
