= Libochovičky =

- Municipality
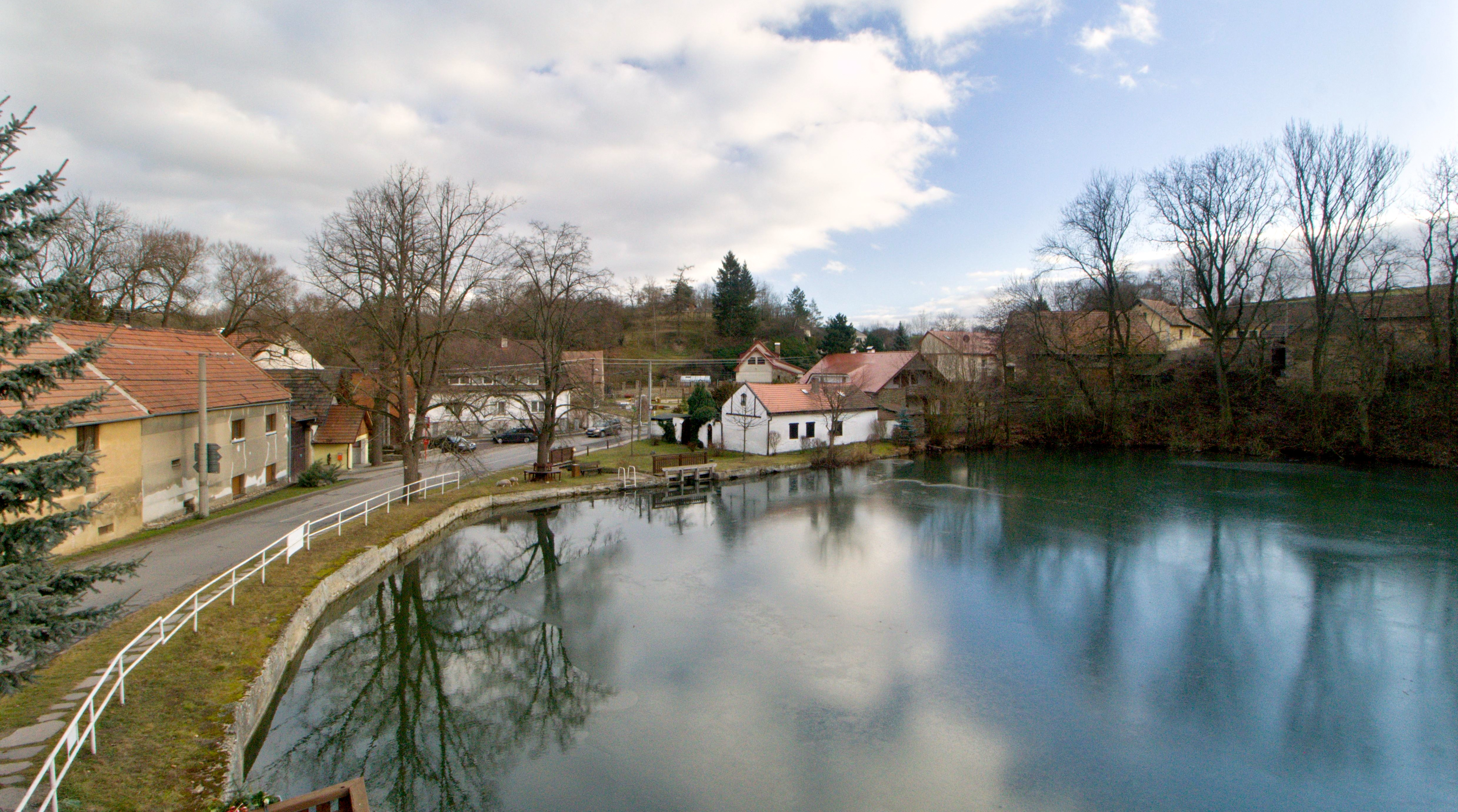
- Centre of Libochovičky

- Flag Coat of arms

- Location in the Czech Republic
- Coordinates: 50°10′22″N 14°14′23″E
- Country: Czech Republic
- Region: Central Bohemian
- District: Kladno
- First mentioned: 1205

Area
  - Total: 2.34 km^{2} (0.90 sq mi)
- Elevation: 285 m (935 ft)

Population (2026-01-01)
  - Total: 86
  - Density: 37/km^{2} (95/sq mi)
- Time zone: UTC+1 (CET)
  - Summer (DST): UTC+2 (CEST)
- Postal code: 273 42
- Website: www.libochovicky.cz

Libochovičky is a municipality and village in Kladno District in the Central Bohemian Region of the Czech Republic. It has about 90 inhabitants.

== Demographics ==
Historical population
Year	Pop.	±%
1869	101	—
1880	136	+34.7%
1890	137	+0.7%
1900	109	−20.4%
1910	141	+29.4%
1921	124	−12.1%
1930	108	−12.9%
1950	79	−26.9%
1961	82	+3.8%
1970	61	−25.6%
1980	51	−16.4%
1991	51	+0.0%
2001	53	+3.9%
2011	58	+9.4%
2021	69	+19.0%
Source: Censuses
