= Dřetovice =

- Municipality
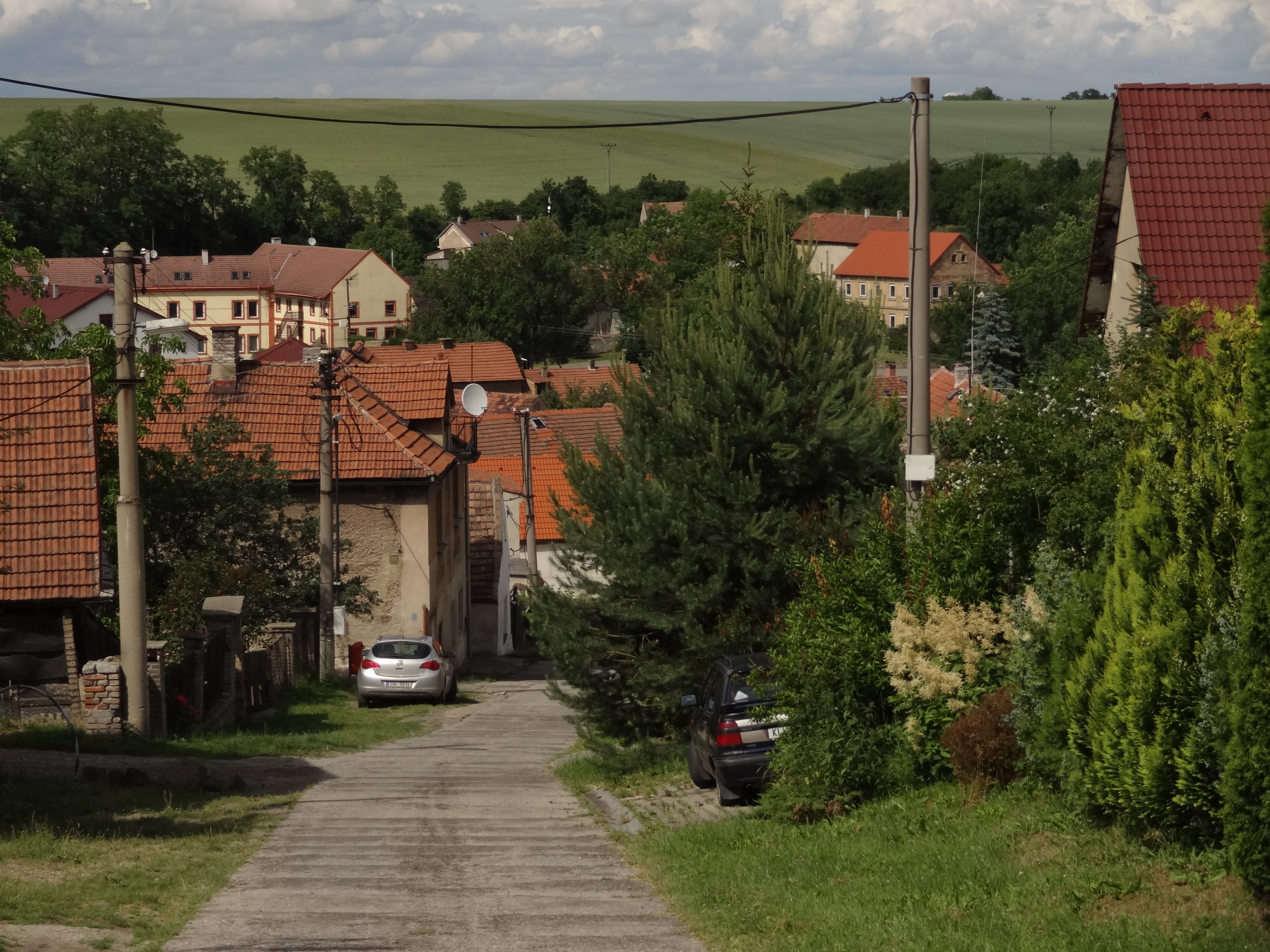
- Southwestern part of Dřetovice

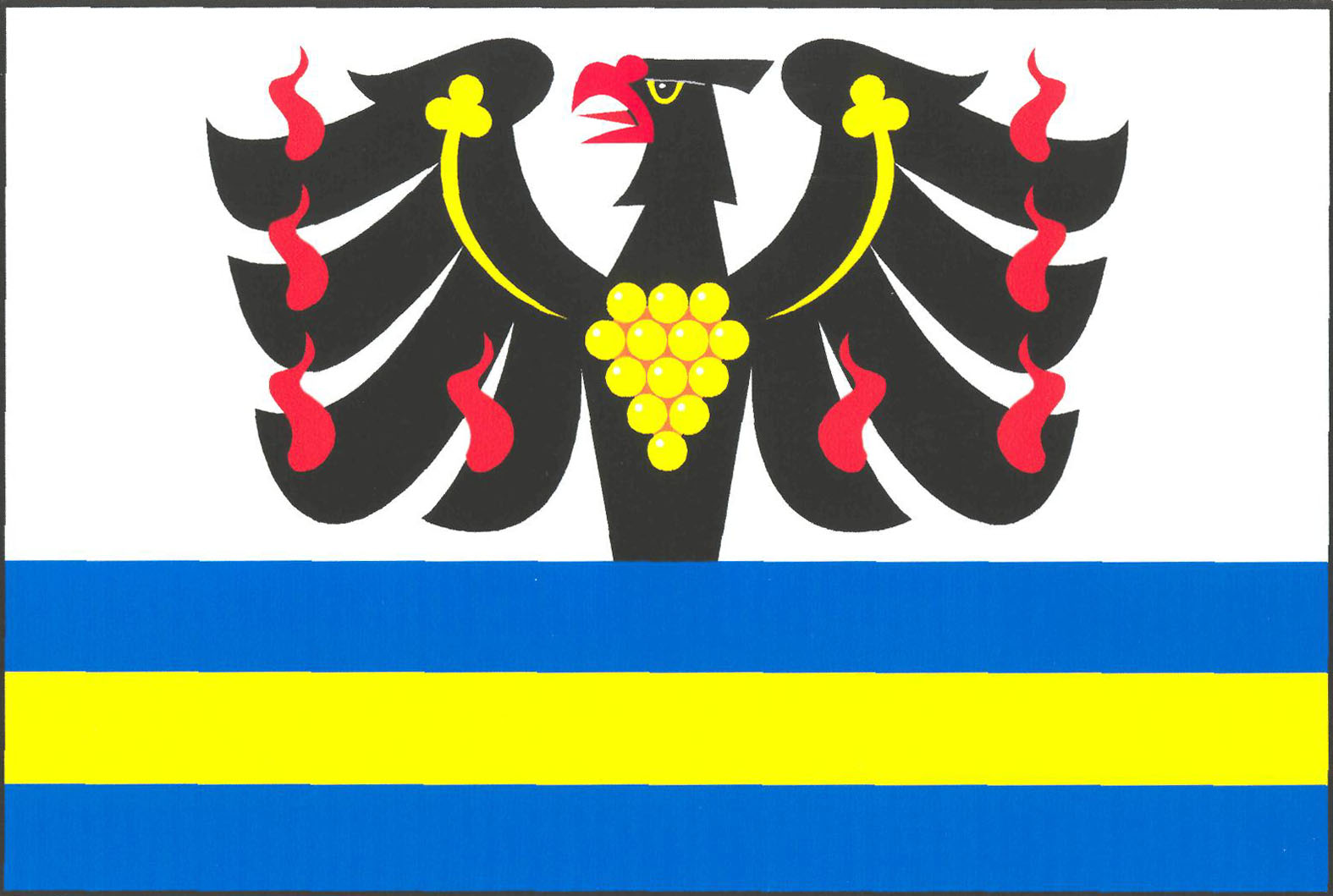
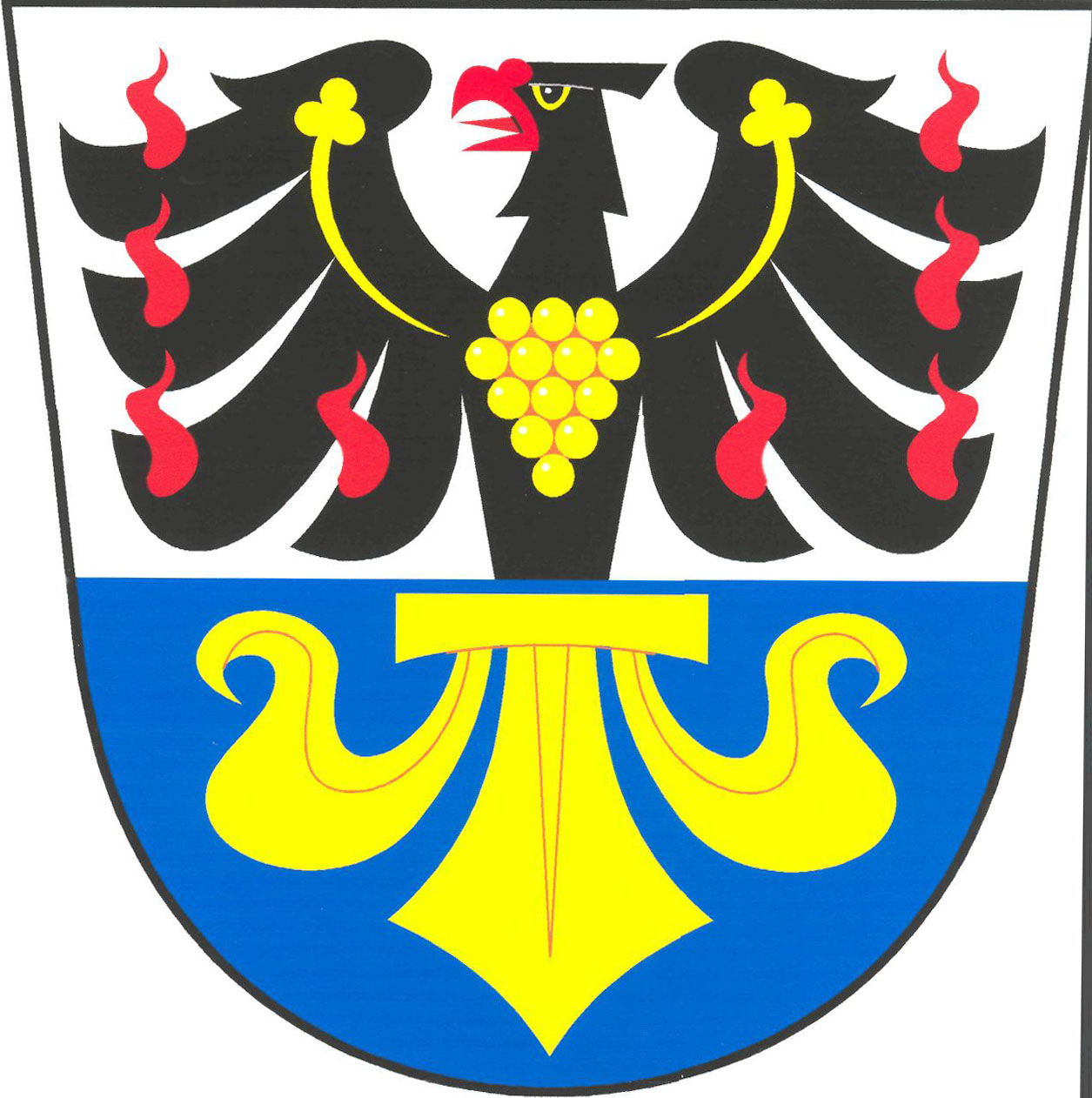
- Flag Coat of arms

- Location in the Czech Republic
- Coordinates: 50°10′58″N 14°12′37″E
- Country: Czech Republic
- Region: Central Bohemian
- District: Kladno
- First mentioned: 1233

Area
  - Total: 5.39 km^{2} (2.08 sq mi)
- Elevation: 255 m (837 ft)

Population (2026-01-01)
  - Total: 467
  - Density: 86.6/km^{2} (224/sq mi)
- Time zone: UTC+1 (CET)
  - Summer (DST): UTC+2 (CEST)
- Postal code: 273 42
- Website: www.obecdretovice.cz

Dřetovice is a municipality and village in Kladno District in the Central Bohemian Region of the Czech Republic. It has about 500 inhabitants.

== Etymology ==
The initial name of the settlement was Držatovice. The name was derived from the personal name Držata, meaning "the village of Držata's people". It then gradually changed into its current form.

== Geography ==
Dřetovice is located about 14 kilometres (9 mi) northwest of Prague. It lies in a flat agricultural landscape of the Prague Plateau. The stream Dřetovický potok flows through the municipality. West of the village are two fishponds supplied by this stream.

== History ==
The first written mention of Dřetovice is from 1233.

== Demographics ==
Historical population

| Year | Pop. | ±% |
|---|---|---|
| 1869 | 701 | — |
| 1880 | 744 | +6.1% |
| 1890 | 872 | +17.2% |
| 1900 | 853 | −2.2% |
| 1910 | 934 | +9.5% |

| Year | Pop. | ±% |
|---|---|---|
| 1921 | 905 | −3.1% |
| 1930 | 843 | −6.9% |
| 1950 | 663 | −21.4% |
| 1961 | 685 | +3.3% |
| 1970 | 575 | −16.1% |

| Year | Pop. | ±% |
|---|---|---|
| 1980 | 476 | −17.2% |
| 1991 | 373 | −21.6% |
| 2001 | 401 | +7.5% |
| 2011 | 466 | +16.2% |
| 2021 | 458 | −1.7% |

Source: Censuses

== Transport ==
The D7 motorway from Prague to Chomutov runs through the municipality.

Dřetovice is located on the railway line Kladno–Kralupy nad Vltavou.

== Sights ==
The main landmark of Dřetovice is the Church of Saint Wenceslaus, located on a hill above the village. It is a Romanesque church with Gothic and Baroque modifications. It current appearance is from the mid-18th century, when the tower was added.

In the centre of the village is the Chapel of the Virgin Mary. It is a simple chapel in the late Baroque style.
