= Chlumčany =

Chlumčany may refer to places in the Czech Republic:

- Chlumčany (Louny District), a municipality and village in the Ústí nad Labem Region
- Chlumčany (Plzeň-South District), a municipality and village in the Plzeň Region
