= Knovíz culture =

Archaeological culture of Central Europe

- Geographical range: Central Europe
- Period: Bronze Age Europe
- Dates: 1300–1025 BC (Knovíz), 1025–750 BC (Štítary)
- Type site: Knovíz
- Major sites: Knovíz, Obory, Plešivec
- Preceded by: Tumulus culture
- Followed by: Hallstatt culture

The Knovíz culture (Czech: Knovízská kultura) was an upper Danubian subgroup of the Late Bronze Age Urnfield culture, located mainly in Bohemia, Thuringia, and Bavaria. The eponymous type site for this culture, in the Czech village of Knovíz, is located near Prague. The Knovíz culture was similar to the neighbouring Milavce culture, except for the funerary rites, which featured occasional skeletal burials as well as cremations.

The Knovíz culture featured a distinctive type of horse, which may have been the predecessor of the so-called 'Celtic' or 'Germanic' pony. Archaeological and genetic evidence tentatively suggests that the people of the Knovíz culture may have been ethnically Celtic.

== Research history ==
Between 1892 and 1893 archaeologists J. L. Píč and Jiří Felcman excavated part of a settlement from the Late Bronze Age near the village of Knovíz. The finds from this settlement were later found to have similar characteristics to those of other sites, and so Knovíz became the eponymous type site for a late Bronze Age culture, mainly centred in Central and Northwestern Bohemia. Initially, the similarity of the Knovíz and Lusatian cultures led to the assumption that these civilizations were ethnically unified, and it was at first suggested that the Knovíz culture emerged from the Lusatian culture.

== Origins ==
The Knovíz culture emerged from the preceding Tumulus culture at the beginning of the Bz D period. Hrala states that the material and ethnic continuity of the Knovíz culture with the Tumulus culture is beyond any doubt.

At the beginning of Ha B1, this culture developed into the Štítary phase.

== Chronology ==
The following chronological table is based on Kuna (2008), Hrala (1973), and Bouzka (1962):

| Year BCE | Reinecke | Hrala | Bouzka |
|---|---|---|---|
| 1300–1200 | Bz C2/D | Knovíz I | K I |
| 1300–1200 | Bz C2/D | Knovíz I | K II |
| 1200–1100 | Ha A1 | Knovíz II | K III |
| 1200–1100 | Ha A1 | Knovíz II | K IV |
| 1100–1025 | Ha A2 | Knovíz III | K V |
| 1025–925 | Ha B1 | Štítary I | K VI |
| 1025–925 | Ha B1 | Štítary I | Št I |
| 925–750 | Ha B2 | Štítary II | Št II |
| 925–750 | Ha B3 | Štítary II | Št III |

=== K I (Bz C2 / Bz D) ===
The K I period begins the transition between the previous Tumulus culture and the Knovíz culture, and is characterised by grooved amphorae with handles on the shoulders, decorated footed bowls and cups, and the earliest bi-conical vessels.

=== K II (Bz D) ===
From this stage, amphorae with a cylindrical neck are found. The biconical vessels from this period have a distinctive vessel wall, with a sharp change in angle in the upper part, which is vertical. The smaller amphora-like containers have grooved decoration, while the larger ones still resemble those of the Tumulus culture.

=== K III (Bz D–Ha A1) ===
The K III phase marks the transition to the Ha A style. The amphorae have a slightly concave neck. The two planes of biconical vessels have a less sharp angle. Amphorae vessels have a cylindrical neck. Jugs are now cup-shaped with an indented and slightly bent neck. Pots are usually double-eared.

=== K IV (Ha A1–Ha A2) ===
Amphorae typically feature an enlarged neck with a curve under the rim. Cups are made in two parts with a conical bottom and a more open neck. Amphorae-shaped containers have a slightly conical or cylindrical neck.

=== K V (Ha A2 / Ha B1) ===
Two-storeyed amphorae with a low, vertically compressed lower part are typical. Biconical vessels have an 'S' profile, occasionally horizontally grooved. Amphorae-shaped vessels have a pronounced open funnel-shaped neck.

=== K VI (Ha B1) ===
The gradual transition to the Ha B style begins at this stage. The cups and containers have a funnel-shaped neck, and the biconical vessels have a continuous profile, without a sharp change in angle.

=== Št I (Ha B1) ===
The two-storeyed amphorae are no longer found at this stage. Ceramics include bowls with a curved body, asymmetrical cups, pots with a narrow offset neck, and amphorae with low and wide necks. Pottery is usually smoothed with a wooden tool. Ceramic production begins to look professional, probably indicating specialized production.

=== Št II (Ha B2–3) ===
The middle phase of the Štítary period is characterized by sharper, harder pottery profiles than previous periods. Ceramics include bowls with wide open conical necks, asymmetrical cups, wide urns, and pots with a handle at the bottom of the neck.

=== Št III (Ha B3–Ha C) ===
The basic shapes of the vessels remains the same, with smoother shaping in the lower part. Decoration is less fine, and amphoras with an indented neck are not found.

== Territory ==
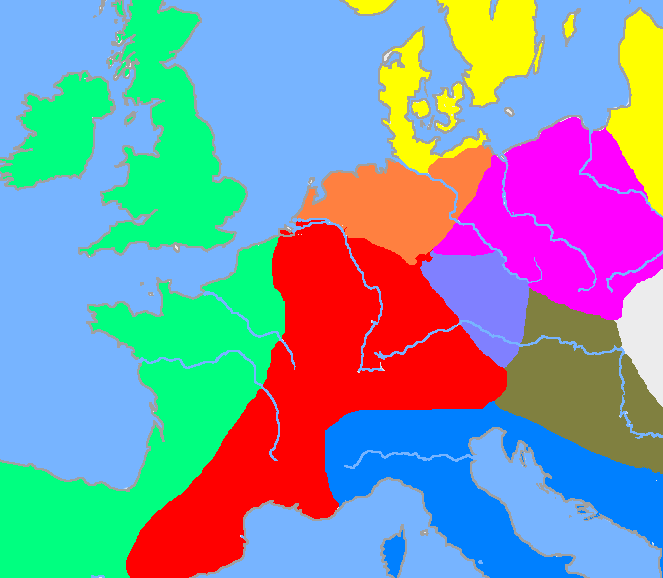
The Knovíz culture, ca. 1200 BC

In period Bz D (1300–1200 BC), with the Knovíz culture occupying western Bohemia, the Lusatian culture expanded into eastern Central Bohemia from the east. By Ha A1 (1200–1100 BC), the Knovíz and Lusatian cultures are separated by an area of uninhabited territory between them. During the late Bronze Age, (Ha A2, 1100–1050) the Knovíz culture expanded, with an apparent retreat of the Lusatian culture to the north and east. The persistent border between these two cultures indicates different cultural, and perhaps ethnic, identities.

The Knovíz culture expanded to Central Bohemia by the time of Ha A2, into the middle Elbe region, where it displaced the Lusatian culture. At the end of this period, border fortifications are constructed, probably due to hostility between the two cultures. Alternatively, it has been suggested that the border zone between the Knovíz and Lusatian cultures was maintained for several centuries, which may suggest a "clear definition of and a respect for the individual territorial integrity of each of the two cultures that were essentially related." A peaceful coexistence between the Knovíz and Lusatian cultures, at least in the border zone, is also indicated by the fairly frequent occurrence of each culture's pottery in the graves of the other, which, since pottery was primarily a women's craft, may indicate marriages between individuals of the two cultures.

== Sites ==
Excavated sites of the Knovíz culture include:

=== Knovíz ===
First excavated in 1892–93, the eponymous Knovíz site is the type site for the Knovíz culture.

Human remains are frequent at this site. Human bones are found broken and charred in multiple pits, scattered among animal bones and other material. Also a complete skeleton of a child is found here.

=== Březno ===
Located on the right bank of the Ohře. This settlement, dating from Ha A1 and Ha A2 (1200–1025BC) is around 3.5 hectares, comprising around 300 buildings.

=== Obory ===
This site contains 87 cremation graves, dated to between Ha A2 and Ha B1 (1100–925 BC). The settlement is continuously populated between these dates, and is one of the largest cemeteries of the Knovíz culture in Bohemia.

The relatively high number of bronze grave goods at the Obory cemetery compared to other sites may indicate that the local population engaged in prospecting.

=== Modřany ===
Hrala describes the Modřany cemetery as a classic site for studying the origins of the Knovíz culture. The site contains distinctive pottery, including footed bowls and amphorae with handles at the base of the body. Additionally, novel forms are found, including jugs with a more balanced height-to-width ratio and an S-shaped curved shape, and bi-conical vessels which have no precursors in this location. The pottery types are distinct from those of the Lusatian culture.

=== Křepenice ===
Near the village of Křepenice, the opening of a quarry at the Kamenná hůrka peak in the 1930s led to the discovery of a cremation burial ground with over 110 graves, placed in rows running roughly east–west.

=== Obříství ===
The Knovíz settlement at Obříství, at the confluence of the two largest Czech rivers, may have been an important communication node and long-distance trading port during the Late Bronze Age.

A grave here contained a claw of a brown bear, a rarity in Bronze Age Bohemia.

=== Konobrže ===
From the period Bz D – Ha B1, human skeletons are found at this settlement which greatly exceed their occurrence at other Knovíz sites, indicating that this may have been a cult centre.

=== Plešivec ===
A huge fortified settlement with a visible system of ramparts. A large number of bronze artifacts, and at least 9 deposits, are found at or near the site.

== Characteristics ==
=== Settlement types ===
Knovíz culture settlements are represented by the following main types:

- on river terraces
- on stream terraces
- on seasonal stream banks
- near springs
- on lake edges
- on hilltops

The majority (70%) of sites fall into the first 3 types, but the hilltop sites were more regularly distributed than the other types. Sites are uniformly distributed along rivers at distances of between 1–3 km.

There are two main types of settlement. The first type involves a relatively short-term settlement followed by subsequent relocation within micro-regions, which is especially common during the Ha A1 to Ha B1 periods, when there was probably an increase of both the population size and the total number of settlements. The second type involves continuous settlements where development occurred, often throughout the entire period of the Knovíz (and Štítary) culture. These settlements are generally larger than the first type, and are mostly situated near large rivers or on the terraces of streams. However, in both types of settlements there is evidence for small-scale movement within residential areas, likely due to factors including limited building life, as well as for hygiene reasons.

Fortified hilltop settlements were probably a late development. These may have been defensive structures, economic and trade hubs, or centres of tribal organization.

There is evidence for a significant increase in the use of cave shelters during the Urnfield period by the people of this culture.

=== Residential buildings ===
There is only limited evidence for Knovíz dwelling construction, but post constructions appear to be consistent. Hrala suggests that the Knovíz stage dwellings were likely to have been similar to the residential buildings of contemporary neighbouring cultures.

In the Štítary phase, pit houses are found, usually around 1m deep and up to 10m long. Walls were plastered with clay, which was sometimes painted.

=== Economy ===
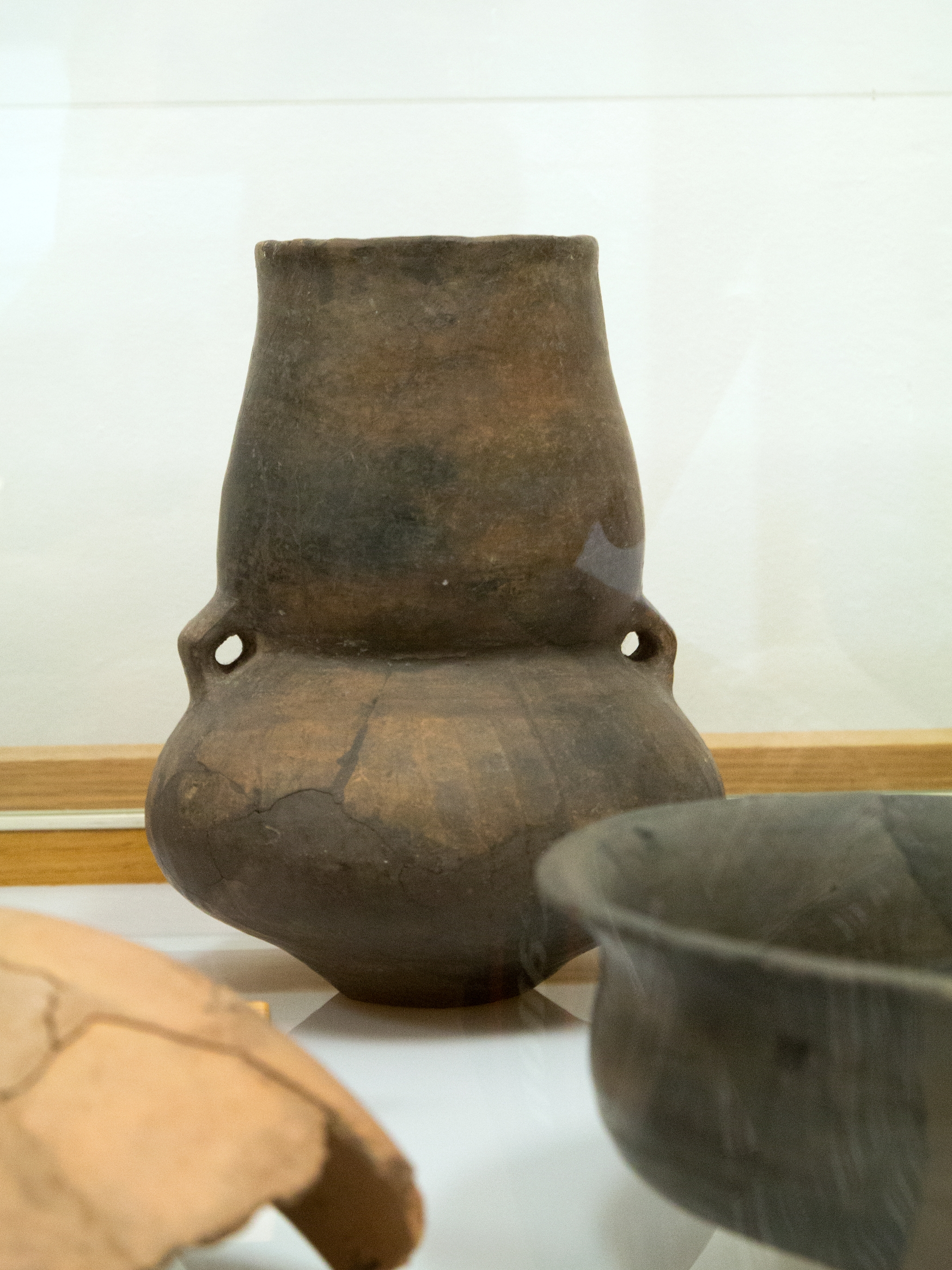
Knovíz culture pottery, late Bronze Age

Livelihood was probably based on agriculture, which is evidenced by the expansion of this culture along the fertile soil of the Elbe river basin and some of its tributaries, and supplemented by pastoralism, probably in the form of cattle farming, particularly in hilly and rocky areas. The contribution from hunting was probably negligible. There is evidence for fishing and gathering of clams, which were occasionally used as ornaments.

Domestic animal bones found at Knovíz sites include pig, goat, sheep, cattle, horse, dog, and one specimen of a cat. Wild animals included deer, hare, and occasionally beaver. Grain including wheat and millet were cultivated.

At the Hostivice-Palouky site, cultivated plant remains included barley, millet, legumes (pea, vetch, and lentil), wheat (spelta, einkorn and emmer) and a few oat grains (which were probably only weeds). This site has a particularly wide variety of cultivated plants compared to other Knovíz sites.

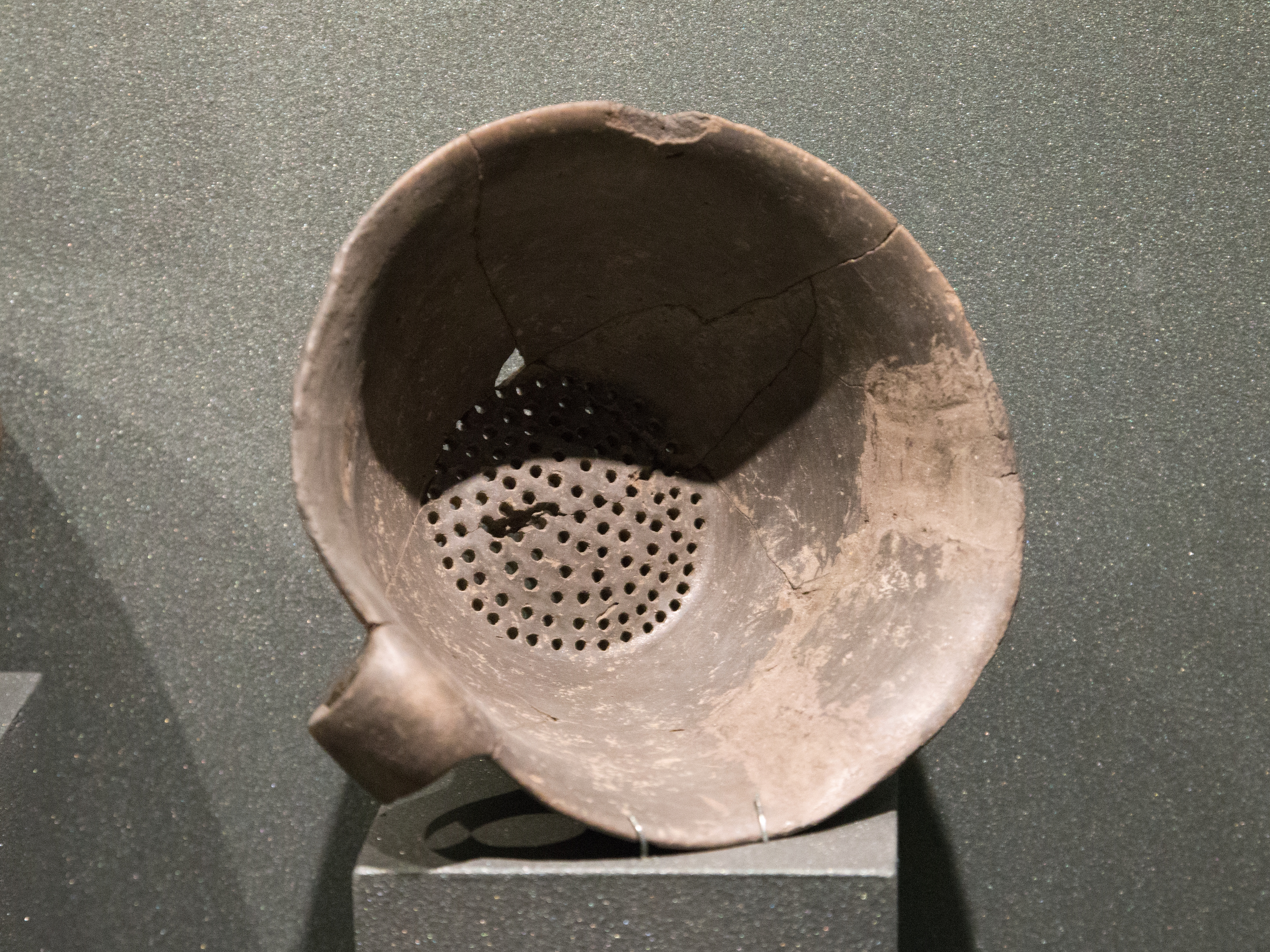
A colander

At Špičák, animal bones included domesticated pig (36.2%), domesticated ox (31.5%), and other ruminants such as sheep and goats (25.2%), showing the increasing reliance on pig rearing.

In northern Bohemia, food storage pits are found, sometimes containing the remains of grain or acorns.

Graphite finds may indicate that this mineral was exploited by the people of this culture.

=== Artefacts ===
In the earliest phase there are slender, vertical amphorae with a cylindrical neck, with handles located at the intersection of the neck and shoulders. These are followed by amphorae with a slightly concave neck, then by amphorae typically with low, slightly open necks, with rudimentary handles and grooved decoration on the shoulders. Later Štítary phase amphorae generally come to have a low funnel-shaped neck with a round bottom. Subsequently, amphorae with a straight or downwardly conical neck are found.

Antler clubs or hammers are found from the beginning of the Knovíz culture, including from Drevníky, where antler clubs are rarely found as grave goods. Partially processed antlers are found at Karlík, indicating local production.

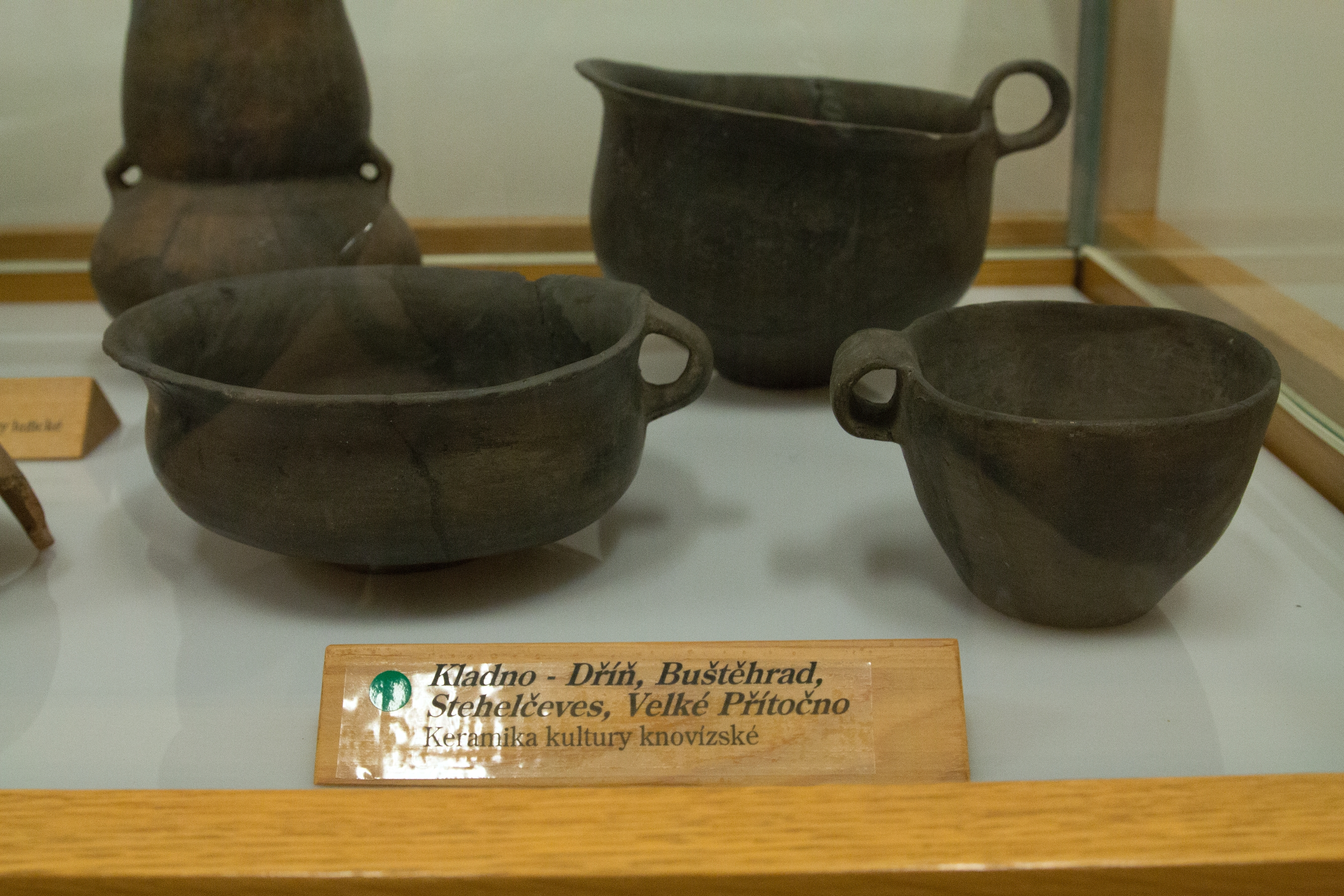
Pottery

A set of small glass beads are found from the burial ground in Tuchoměřice, which apparently originate from Frattesina in northern Italy.

Polychrome glass beads appear during Ha A (12th–early 11th century B.C.) and appear similar to the beads made in glass workshops in northern Italy. Chemical analysis also suggests that the beads from the Knovíz culture also have a unique mixed alkali composition like those of Northern Italy, and likely originate from this area. This suggests the existence of a south-north trade route from northern Italy across the Alps to the Knovíz and other western Urnfield cultures.

A hoard at Jenišovice containined an amber bead and 14 decorated bronze Jenišovice/Kirkendrup cups.

At Místo artefacts including bronze daggers and a bronze sword have been found.

Other bronze objects include razors, needles, and sickles.

Swords are rare. "Tongue grip" swords are among the most common in the Knovíz I stage. The Riegsee-type sword is not found.

=== Metallurgy ===
There is evidence that the people of the Knovíz culture mined and worked metal from the Ore Mountains. A foundry site has also been found at Místo.

=== Amber ===
Amber is usually absent from the Knovíz culture. Some have argued this may be related to the predominant funeral rite of cremation burial, although others argue that this is incorrect. Amber is however found at the end of Ha A2 at Jenišovice (near Býkev), at Obříství, where lumps of raw amber are found with pottery and dated to Ha A1, two amber beads at Březnice from Br D, a few fragments from Hvožďany, and two tiny spindle beads from Senožaty.

=== Funerary rites ===
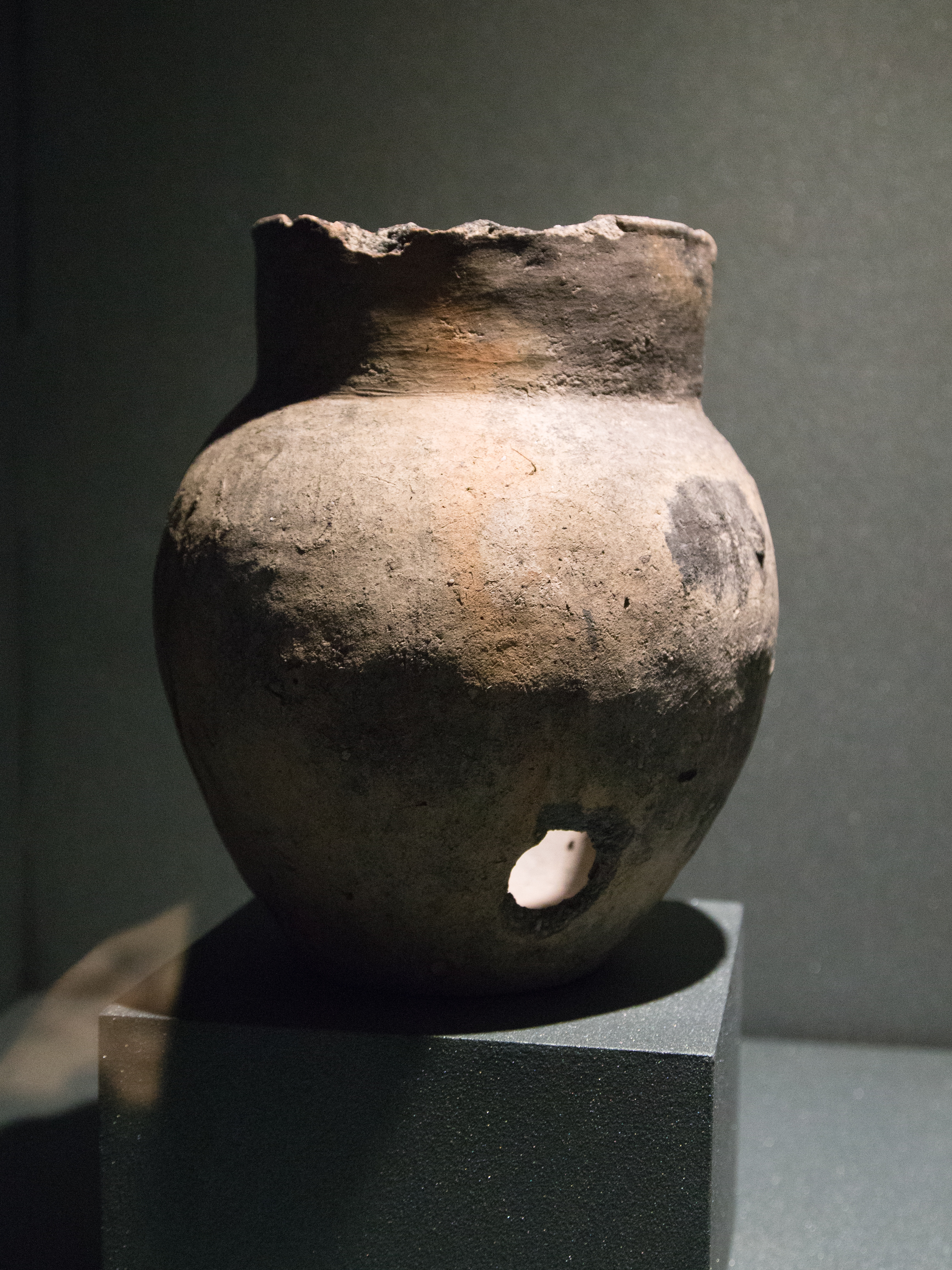
Cremation urn with 'spirit hole'

According to Koutecký, there are 3 main types of burial:

- Ritual cremation graves, in which burned human remains and grave goods are placed in an urn and buried ('urnfields')
- Ritual skeletal burials in oval or rectangular pits, sometimes with grave goods and lined with stones. This type of burial is found either on the periphery of urnfield cemeteries, or separately. Rich grave goods are less common.
- Skeletal burials in settlement pits, mostly without grave goods.

The predominant funeral rite of the Knovíz culture is cremation, which is found in the earliest graves, and is also found less commonly in the preceding Tumulus culture. Burials typically take the form of a flat grave without a covering mound, with remains placed in a pit and usually in a single urn, which is often an amphora-shaped container. In some urns, a hole was pierced, which was probably related to the conception of the afterlife, perhaps an "opening for the soul". In addition to cremation graves, skeletal inhumations are also found, which are an "exceptional phenomenon", and appear to have been reserved mostly for men, sometimes children, and rarely women.

Burials under tumuli are found. Large graves with bronze vessels, swords, and axes, as well as horse-drawn vehicles are found at Žatec, separated from a group of uniform graves.

Hrala considers it likely that a certain fraction of the population was not buried at all.

Knovíz culture urnfields are generally small, usually with less than a few dozen graves. A site near Ctiněves is one of the largest, with over 500 urn burials. Swords are only rarely found as grave goods.

Skeletons are often found disarticulated or partially articulated with the bones artificially modified, with signs that the flesh has been removed with tools.

The practice of burning the dead and placing their remains in urns may represent a shift towards marking a clearer distinction between the living and the dead, perhaps in response to the practice of human sacrifice in the late Bronze Age. In the Knovíz culture, this shift in funerary rite was not universal and many individuals did not receive a ritual funeral.

=== Animal burials ===
At a site at Březno two puppies are buried in the same grave.

=== Cannibalism ===
Evidence from human remains has been interpreted as indicating that the Knovíz culture may have practiced cannibalism. A large number of human bones are found "split, crushed, broken and charred" at Knovíz, which may indicate that human flesh was eaten by the people of this culture, apparently not due to shortage of food. Czech anthropologist Jindřich Matiegka believed that the Knoviz people "relished" both their enemies and their own kinfolk. These interpretations of the archaeological evidence have been criticized as unsubstantiated by the archaeologist Heidi Peter-Röcher.

=== Human Sacrifice ===
There is evidence, mainly from skeletal burials in pits, for human sacrifices in the Knovíz culture area. In the earlier periods, this evidence often takes the form of broken skulls, which show signs of stoning. From the Ha B1 period, burials with severed heads or skulls, more often female than male, are found.

=== Slavery ===
Although cremation burial is typical, human skeletal remains (often incomplete) in pits are also found. These remains frequently seem to have been carelessly thrown into pits, and show signs of violence. Unger speculates that these burials may have been slaves, denied a proper burial due to their low status.

=== Ritual sites ===
A 17 meter diameter moat with a single passage and a sandstone stele, apparently a ritual site related to the cult of the sun, was discovered at Čakovice. A similar, smaller structure was discovered at the Mutějovice site.

=== Horses ===
The domesticated horses of the Knovíz culture were found to be significantly smaller than Przewalski's horses, continuing a trend in size reduction from Bohemian early Bronze Age specimens. This progressive decrease in size may later result in the particularly small 'Celtic' or 'Germanic' pony (Equus caballus celticus) of the Iron Age. They show relatively little variation, probably as a result of local breeding without input from wild horses or domesticates from elsewhere.

== Ethnicity ==
The peoples of the Late Bronze Age Urnfield culture are considered an important part of the formation of historical European nations. It has been argued that the western Urnfield cultures, including the Knovíz culture, may have been ethnically Proto-Celtic or pre-Celtic.

== Archaeogenetics ==
A study by Patterson et al. (2022) found that average Early European Farmer ancestry significantly increased in some populations of North-Central Europe and Britain during the Middle to Late Bronze Age, with the earliest individuals exhibiting this ancestry profile found in Knovíz culture contexts. The study notes that the Knovíz individuals were genetically distinct from preceding Czech Early Bronze Age samples, and genetically similar to the genetic outliers from Margetts Pit and Cliffs End Farm in Britain. The authors do not claim that their results prove that the Knovíz population are the direct source of the Margetts Pit and Cliffs End individuals, but suggest that these groups may have been part of an common population which was expanding across Europe at this time.

Y-DNA haplogroups at Knovíz include subclades of R1b (R-L2 x 6, R-L151 x 2, R-S497 x 1, R-S1161 x 1), R1a (R-Z280 x 1), I2 (I-L1229 x 1, I-Z2069 x 1), and H (H-P96 x 1). MtDNA haplogroups are more varied, and include subclades of H (x 13), J1 (x 5), K1 (x 4), U5 (x 4), T (x 3), U2 (x 2), I4 (x 2), X2b, and W3a.

== Sources ==
- Jiráň, Luboš (2013). The Czech Lands and Austria in the Bronze Age. Oxford University Press. doi:10.1093/oxfordhb/9780199572861.013.0043.
- Harding, A. F. (2000). European societies in the bronze age. Cambridge, UK: Cambridge University Press. p. 70. ISBN 0-521-36477-9. OCLC 41231471.
- Asare, Michael O. (2021). "A medieval hillfort as an island of extraordinary fertile Archaeological Dark Earth soil in the Czech Republic". European Journal of Soil Science. 72 (1): 98–113. doi:10.1111/ejss.12965. ISSN 1351-0754. S2CID 216184012.
- Kyselý, René (2018). "Red deer (Cervus elaphus) skeleton from the Early Bronze Age pit at Brandýs (Czech Republic)". Archaeological and Anthropological Sciences. 10 (1): 157–174. doi:10.1007/s12520-016-0344-x. ISSN 1866-9557. S2CID 133038990.
- Patterson, Nick (2022). "Large-scale migration into Britain during the Middle to Late Bronze Age". Nature. 601 (7894): 588–594. Bibcode:2022Natur.601..588P. doi:10.1038/s41586-021-04287-4. ISSN 1476-4687. PMC 8889665. PMID 34937049.
- Kyselý, René (2016). "Horse size and domestication: Early equid bones from the Czech Republic in the European context". Anthropozoologica. 51 (1): 1–39. doi:10.5252/az2016n1a2. ISSN 0761-3032. S2CID 133371849.
- Jelínek, Jan (1990). Human sacrifice and rituals in bronze and iron ages : the state of art. OCLC 716744259.
- Berend, Nora (2013), "The history of the region and the question of origins", Central Europe in the High Middle Ages: Bohemia, Hungary and Poland, c.900–c.1300, Cambridge Medieval Textbooks, Cambridge: Cambridge University Press, pp. 40–109, doi:10.1017/cbo9780511813795.002, ISBN 978-0-521-78695-9
- Pankowská, Anna (2018). "Diachronic variation in secondary burial practices in Bronze and Iron Age Moravia". Journal of Archaeological Science: Reports. 21: 460–471. Bibcode:2018JArSR..21..460P. doi:10.1016/j.jasrep.2018.08.013. ISSN 2352-409X. S2CID 165415208.
- Kuna, Martin (2008). Archeologie pravěkých Čech / 5 Doba bronzova. Praha: Archeologický Ústav AV ČR. ISBN 978-80-86124-78-0. OCLC 299963940.
- Bohdálková, Leona (2018). "Atmospheric metal pollution records in the Kovářská Bog (Czech Republic) as an indicator of anthropogenic activities over the last three millennia". Science of the Total Environment. 633: 857–874. Bibcode:2018ScTEn.633..857B. doi:10.1016/j.scitotenv.2018.03.142. ISSN 0048-9697. PMID 29602122. S2CID 4495877.
- Koutecký, Drahomír (1990). "SKELETAL "BURIALS" IN THE PITS OF KNOVÍZ SETTLEMENTS IN BOHEMIA". Anthropologie (1962-). 28 (2/3): 175–188. ISSN 0323-1119. JSTOR 26295084.
- Hrala, Jiří (1973). Knovízská kultura ve středních Čechách. Archeologický ústav ČSAV. OCLC 13605506.
- Unger, Jiri (2016). "Obříství, a late Bronze age Port of trade in Central Bohemia". Studia Hercynia. 19.
- Jílek, Jan (2022). "The oldest millet herbal beer in the Europe? The ninth century BCE bronze luxury bucket from Kladina, Czech Republic". Archaeometry. 64 (2): 454–467. doi:10.1111/arcm.12711. ISSN 0003-813X. S2CID 237702116.
- Kipfer, Barbara Ann (2021). Encyclopedic dictionary of archaeology (2nd ed.). Cham, Switzerland: Springer. ISBN 978-3-030-58292-0. OCLC 1253375738.
- Roblíčková, Martina (2003). "Domesticated animal husbandry in the Bronze Age on the basis of osteological remains". Archeologické rozhledy. 55 (3).
- Beneš, Jaromír (2008). Bioarcheologie v České republice. Jihočeská univerzita, Přírodovědecká fakulta. ISBN 978-80-7394-026-3. OCLC 320200038.
- Venclová, N (2011). "Late Bronze Age mixed-alkali glasses from Bohemia". Archeologické Rozhledy. 63 (4): 559–585.
