= Miroslav Šubrt =

Czech sports official

- Born: 16 July 1926; Vlčí, Czechoslovakia
- Died: 5 April 2012 (aged 85); Prague, Czech Republic
- Known for: International Ice Hockey Federation; Czech Ice Hockey Association
- Honours: Olympic Order; IIHF Hall of Fame

Miroslav Šubrt (16 July 1926 – 5 April 2012) was a Czech ice hockey executive for the International Ice Hockey Federation (IIHF) and Czech Ice Hockey Association. Šubrt worked as an executive for the IIHF from 1956 to 2003, the longest for a high ranked functionary in IIHF history. He was awarded the Olympic Order in 2002 and was inducted into the IIHF Hall of Fame in 2004.

== Career ==
Šubrt was born on 16 July 1926 in Vlčí. He studied business in Louny and Prague in school.

After playing amateur ice hockey and working as a referee, Šubrt worked as the co-founder and president of HC Hvězda Praha, a Czech ice hockey club. In 1956, he was elected as a board member for the Czech Ice Hockey Association and a year later was named a directorate member at the Ice Hockey World Championships and Olympic ice hockey tournaments.

Šubrt was later elected to the 1959 IIHF World Championship Organizing Committee and IIHF Council where in this capacity he participated in constructing more than 10 Olympics during his time with the IIHF. As a member of these executive positions, Šubrt was part of the conversation for creating the IIHF World U20 Championship and he remained involved with the World Juniors throughout his service with the IIHF.

In 1966, he was named vice president of the IIHF and was awarded the Olympic Order for his work with the IIHF and the Czech Olympic Committee in 2002. Upon his retirement in 2003, Šubrt became the longest serving high ranked functionary in the IIHF. He was named an honorary president of the IIHF in 2003 and was inducted into the IIHF Hall of Fame in 2004 as a builder.

Šubrt died from age-related problems on 5 April 2012.
