= D7 motorway (Czech Republic) =

Czech motorway

D7 Motorway
- Dálnice D7

Route information
- Length: 54 km (34 mi) Planned: 78 km (48 mi)

Major junctions
- From: D0 in Prague
- I/13 in Chomutov
- To: German border near Hora Sv. Šebestiána

Location
- Country: Czech Republic
- Regions: Praha, Central Bohemian, Ústí nad Labem
- Major cities: Prague, Slaný, Chomutov

Highway system
- Highways in the Czech Republic
← D6	→ D8

D7 motorway (Czech: Dálnice D7) is a motorway connecting Prague to Chomutov, from where it continues as a dual and later single carriageway to Chemnitz in Germany. As of 2025, the motorway is 54 km (34 mi) long.

It is one of two continuous motorway links between Prague with Ústí nad Labem Region. The primary function of D7 motorway is to connect the industrial regions of Žatec, Louny, Most, and Chomutov.

== Course ==
Before 2016, the road was designated as the Expressway R7 (Czech: rychlostní silnice R7).

The D7 motorway is a not yet fully completed motorway leading from Prague through Louny to Spořice near Chomutov. It will be 78 km (48 mi) long once complete and is planned as a four-lane road throughout its entire length.

=== Prague to Louny ===
The D7 motorway starts in the north-west of Prague, with a temporary free connection to the I/7 road.

From the Ruzyně off-ramp, the motorway continues in a north-westerly direction towards Slaném, passing the town of Buštěhrad. Near the village of Knovíz, the motorway is currently provisionally terminated and becomes the I/7 road leading up to the junction with the I/16 road at the Slaný-západ MÚK on the right half of the future motorway profile. After completion, the motorway will therefore continue in a north-westerly direction, curving from Knovíz to form the south-western bypass of Slaný, crossing several valleys.

The continuation northwest of Slaný will follow the route of the current I/7 road, which forms the left half of the future motorway profile, except for the section near Písek, where a north-eastern bypass will be created. At Kutrovice, the motorway will then cross a valley, then pass by the village of Třebíz to the border of the Central Bohemia and Ústí nad Labem Region. The section from the border of the regions, including the south-western bypass of the town of Panenský Týnec, was put into operation in December 2021 and followed the previously put into operation section near Sulce (Toužetín), which was put into operation in 2009. From Sulce, it continues past Chlumčany (partially operational in December 2023, fully operational in June 2024) to Louny, where it is connected to its south-western bypass, which was put into operation in September 2023.

=== Louny to Chomutov ===
The D7 motorway bypasses the town of Louny on its southwestern edge and creates a southwestern bypass. It will then continue between Louny and Postoloprty in the valley of the Ohře River, to form the northern bypass of Postoloprty. It then leaves the valley of the Ohře River and runs parallel to the Chomutovka River to the town of Chomutov, with the motorway already operational from Postoloprty to Chomutov. The whole section from Postoloprty to Chomutov is typical of the flat landscape. It ends south of Chomutov, and at the Spořice off-ramp, it freely transitions to the I/7 road.

The sections of this motorway already in operation are built in the R 25.5/100 category. The remaining, not yet operational sections of this part of the motorway will also be built in the R 25.5/100 category. A capacity upgrade was carried out on the 4.45 kilometres (2.77 mi) long section in Chlumčany.

=== Future developments ===
In the future, the D7 will start at a grade separated crossing with the D0 in Prague, next to the settlement of Na Padesátníku. The planning is yet to begin.

== Route description ==
Country	Region	Location	km	mi	Exit	Name	Destinations	Notes
Czech Republic	Prague	Prague	0	0.0	—			Kilometrage starting point
Czech Republic	Prague	Prague	1	0.62	—	Přední Kopanina	D0	
Czech Republic	Prague	Prague	2	1.2	—	Aviatická (Letiště)		
Czech Republic	Central Bohemian Region	Central Bohemian Region	3	1.9	—	Kněževes		Temporary start of the motorway
Czech Republic	Central Bohemian Region	Central Bohemian Region	5	3.1	—	Středokluky		
Czech Republic	Central Bohemian Region	Central Bohemian Region			Rest area	Odpočívka Středokluky		
Czech Republic	Central Bohemian Region	Central Bohemian Region	7	4.3	—	Buštěhrad	I/61	
Czech Republic	Central Bohemian Region	Central Bohemian Region	9	5.6	—	Stehelčeves		
Czech Republic	Central Bohemian Region	Central Bohemian Region	18	11	—	Knovíz		
Czech Republic	Central Bohemian Region	Central Bohemian Region			Rest area	Odpočívka Netovice		
Czech Republic	Central Bohemian Region	Central Bohemian Region	21	13	—	Kvíc		
Czech Republic	Central Bohemian Region	Central Bohemian Region	24	15	—	Slaný-západ		
Czech Republic	Central Bohemian Region	Central Bohemian Region	32	20	—	Hořešovice		
Czech Republic	Usti nad Labem Region	Usti nad Labem Region	37	23	—	Panenský Týnec		
Czech Republic	Usti nad Labem Region	Usti nad Labem Region			Rest area	Odpočívka Smolnice		
Czech Republic	Usti nad Labem Region	Usti nad Labem Region	45	28	—	Louny-východ		
Czech Republic	Usti nad Labem Region	Usti nad Labem Region	49	30	—	Louny-západ		
Czech Republic	Usti nad Labem Region	Usti nad Labem Region	53	33	—	Březno		
Czech Republic	Usti nad Labem Region	Usti nad Labem Region	56	35	—	Postoloprty-západ		
Czech Republic	Usti nad Labem Region	Usti nad Labem Region	60	37	—	Bitozeves		
Czech Republic	Usti nad Labem Region	Usti nad Labem Region	65	40	—	Žiželice	I/27	
Czech Republic	Usti nad Labem Region	Usti nad Labem Region			Rest area	Odpočívka Hrušovany		
Czech Republic	Usti nad Labem Region	Usti nad Labem Region	70	43	—	Lažany		
Czech Republic	Usti nad Labem Region	Usti nad Labem Region	75	47	—	Droužkovice		
Czech Republic	Usti nad Labem Region	Usti nad Labem Region	78	48	—	Spořice	I/7	Kilometrage end point End of the toll section (only for electronic tolls over 3.5t) Start of the road for motor vehicles
1.000 mi = 1.609 km; 1.000 km = 0.621 mi: Proposed; Unopened

== Images ==
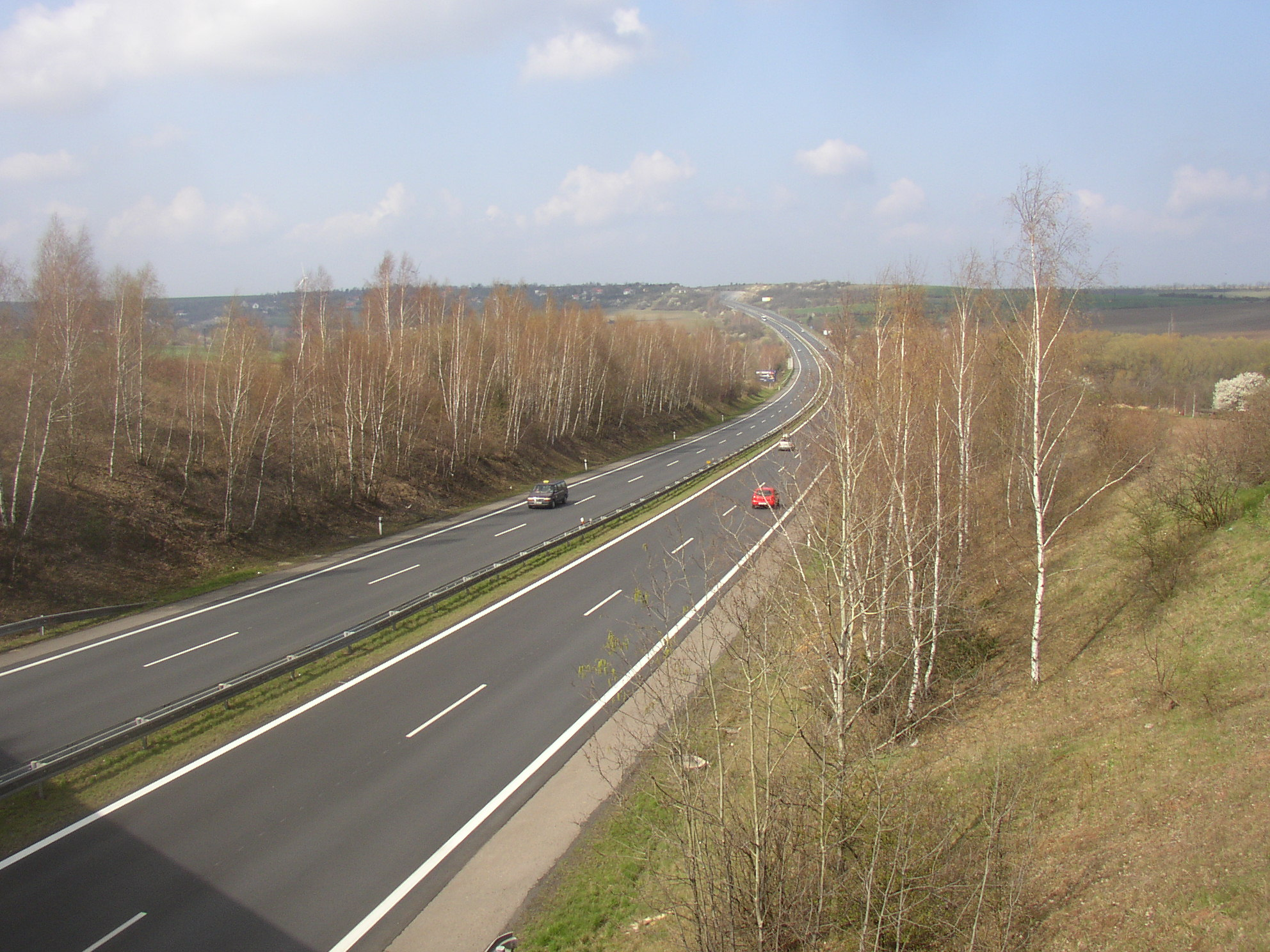
Section of D7 near Brandýsek, completed in 1984.

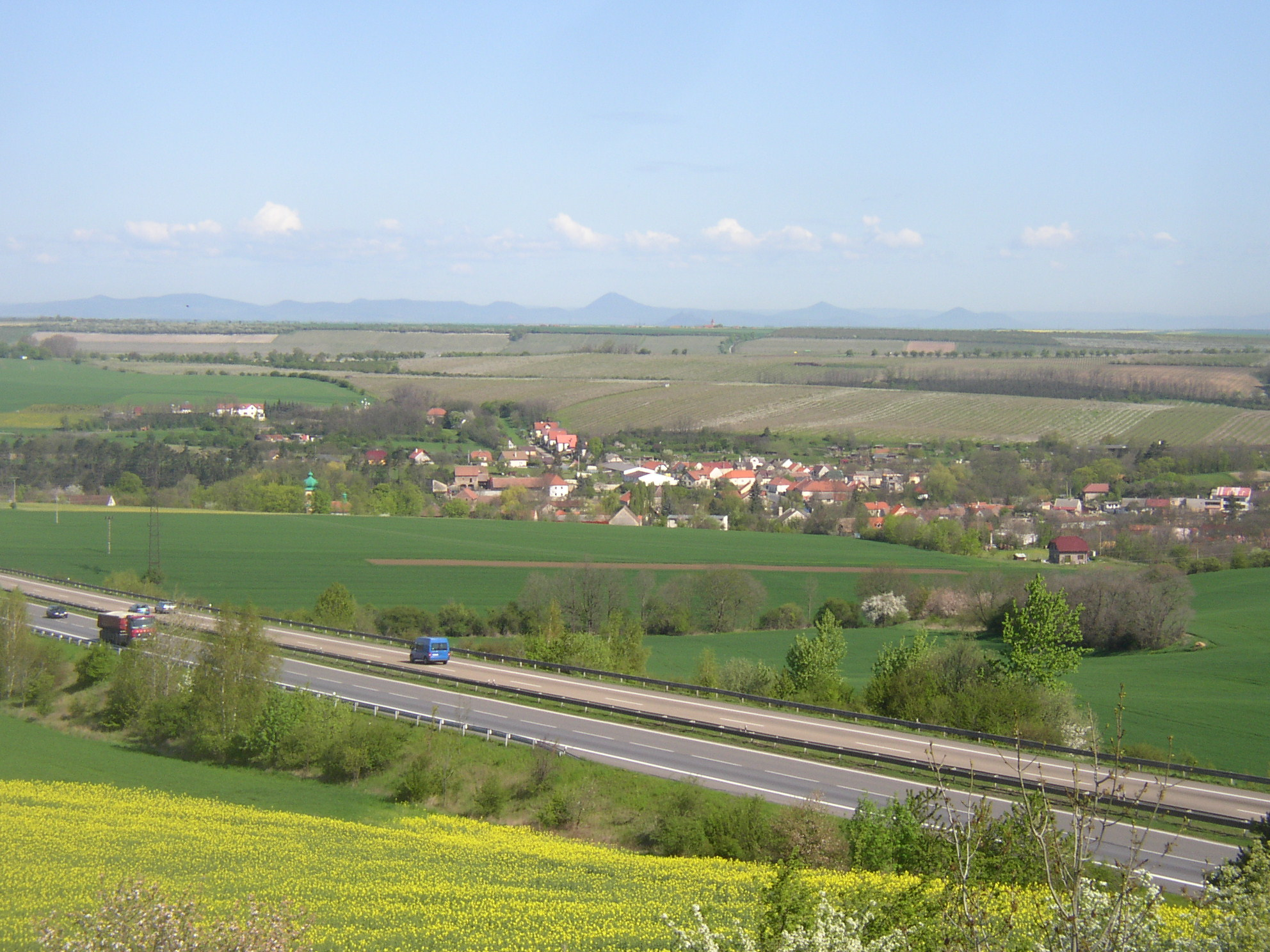
Village of Knovíz, Kladno District.

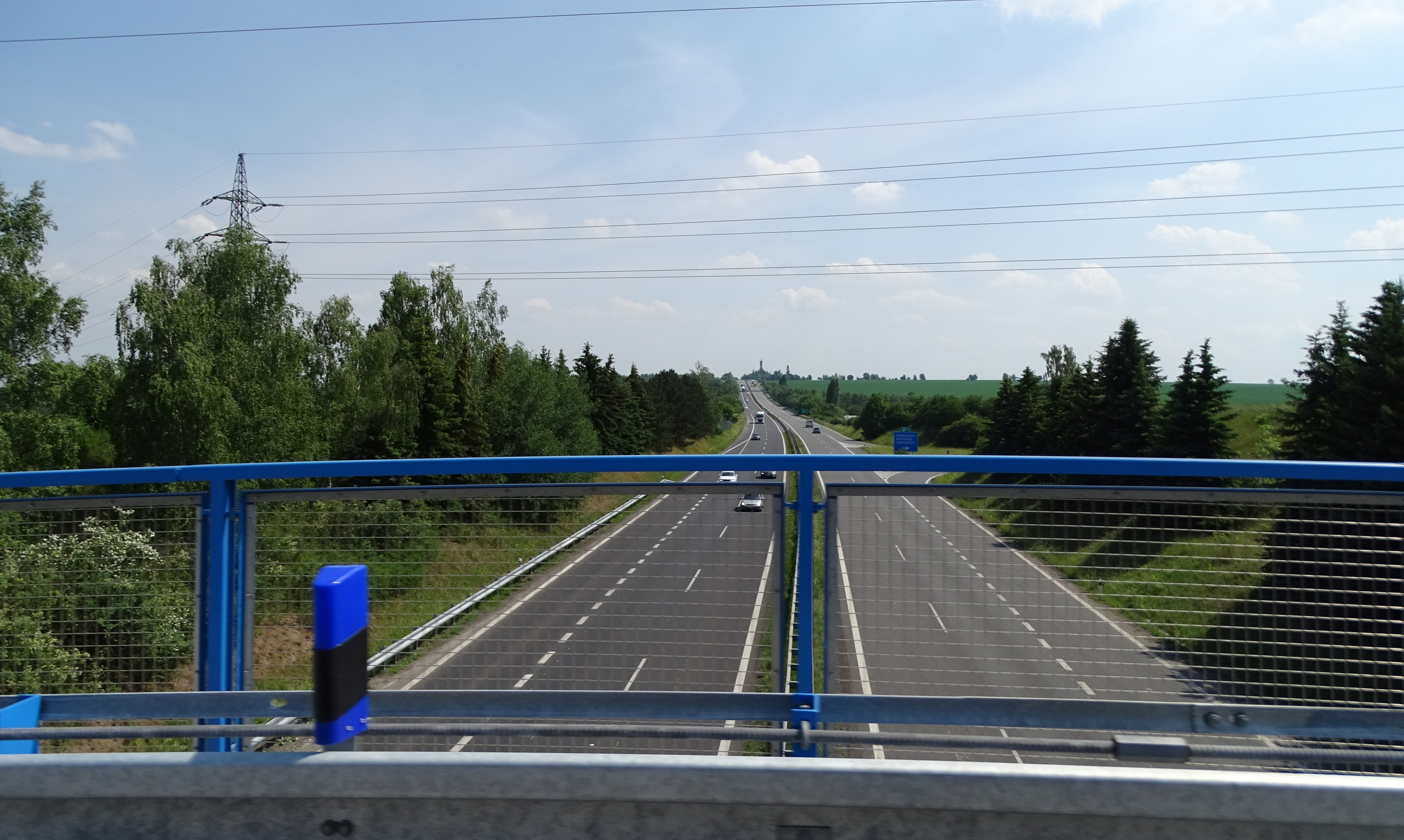
near Buštěhrad

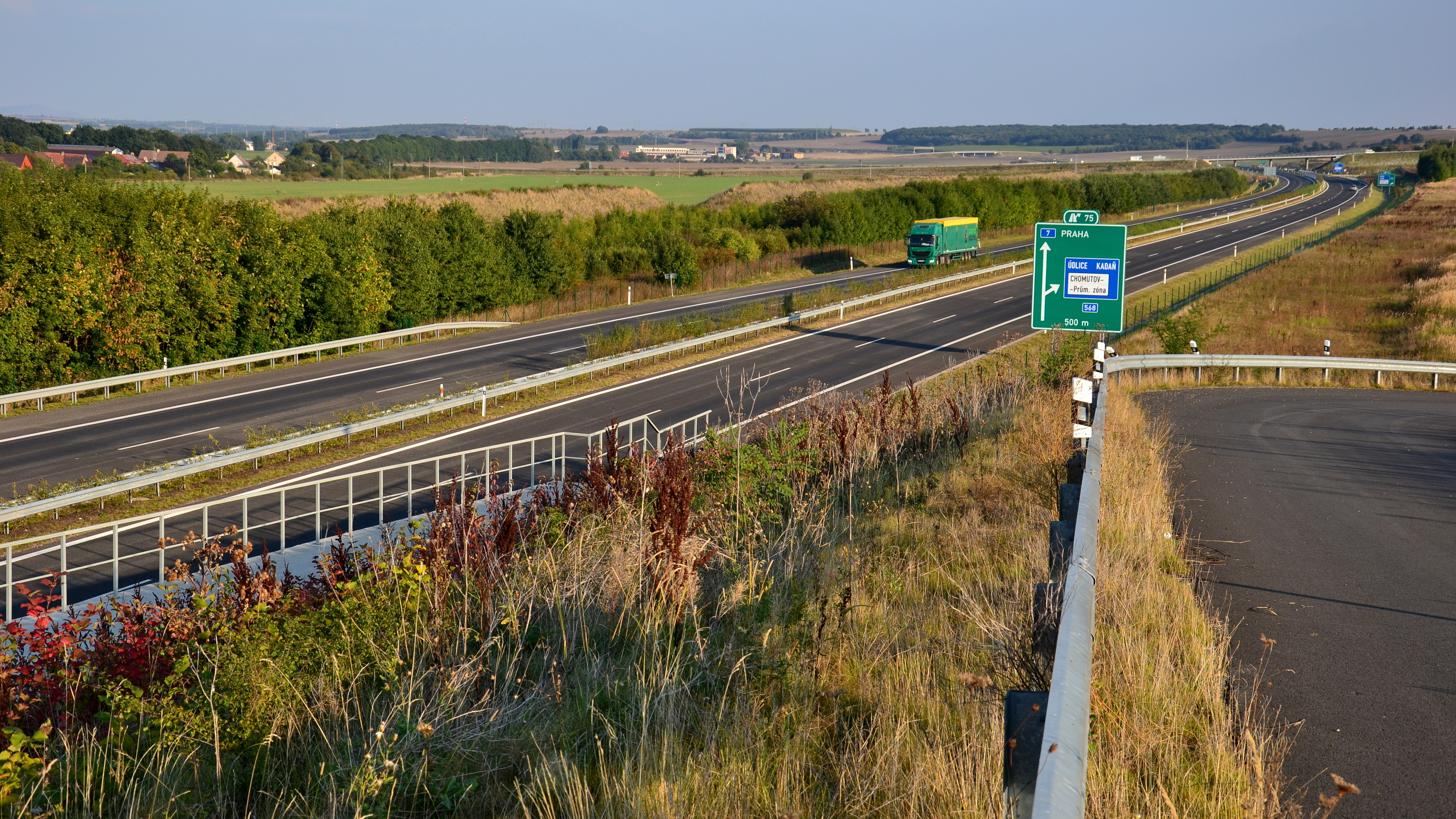
Near Droužkovice
