= D0 motorway (Czech Republic) =

Czech motorway, outer ring road of Prague

Coordinates: 49°58′46″N 14°28′49″E

D0 Motorway
- Dálnice D0
- Prague Ring; Pražský okruh

Route information
- Part of E50 / E65
- Length: 40 km (25 mi) 78 km (48 mi) / 90.8 km (56.4 mi)

Major junctions
- Beltway around Prague
- D3 / E55

Location
- Country: Czech Republic
- Regions: Praha, Central Bohemian
- Major cities: Prague

Highway system
- Highways in the Czech Republic
→ D1

Motorway D0 on the Czech motorway network.

D0 motorway (Czech: Dálnice D0) or Prague Ring Road (Czech: Pražský okruh) is a motorway which, when completed, would create an outer ring road around in Prague, Czech Republic. Most of the Czech motorways radiate from the D0. Unlike the inner ring road, whose sub-sections have been given different official street names, the Prague Ring Road is also the official name of a street in all parts of the ring road leading through Prague.

It was formerly called R1 expressway (Czech: Rychlostní silnice R1). Two disjunct sections are opened to the public, one going all the way from the Ruzyně Airport to the interchange with the D1, the other one being a 5-kilometre-long (3.1 mi) road on the eastern border of Prague. A section connecting these two segments is to be built next. Other segments under preparation include a bridge over the Vltava river near Suchdol.

In 1998, the estimated cost of the construction was CZK 31 billion, in February 2005 the price was raised to CZK 47 billion and in 2009 the Ministry of Transport announced that CZK 71 billion was still needed for completion. In the meantime, 40 km from the planned 80 km are in operation. As of 2018, completion is not expected until 2030 at the earliest.

== Designation and categorization ==
On the map of the Czechoslovak road network, published by the Ministry of Technology in 1947, the intended ring road around Prague is marked with the number 1. Plans adopted on 23 June 1976 by Resolution No. 155 of the Government of the Czech Socialist Republic, refer to the H1 motor ring road. The letter H was used in the plans at that time for long-distance main roads of a lower category than motorways, i.e. for expressways.

In the plans from 1977, the name "outer ring road" was used (in addition to the names "middle ring road" and "inner ring road"), but at the same time it was still referred to as the H1 ring road, while the middle ring road was referred to as the New Town Ring Road and the inner ring road as the City Ring Road. With the transfer of expressways to the motorway network on 1 January 2016, the Prague Ring Road was renumbered as the D0 motorway.

== Construction history ==
=== Oldest sections ===
In 1984, the first sections were opened: the Satalice - Počernice (at the eastern end of Prague) and Slivenec - Třebonice sections. In 1993, the section between Satalice and Počernice was extended to Běchovice. In 2000, the Slivenec - Třebonice section was extended to Řepy and in 2001, the same section was extended to Ruzyně. Thus, from 2001 until 20 September 2010, two separate sections were in operation:

- the Satalice - Běchovice section in the east of the city, connecting D10, D11 and the Štěrboholská radial
- the section Slivenec - Třebonice - Řepy - Ruzyně in the west of the city connecting the Barrandovská spur, D5, D6 and D7.

=== Southwest section ===
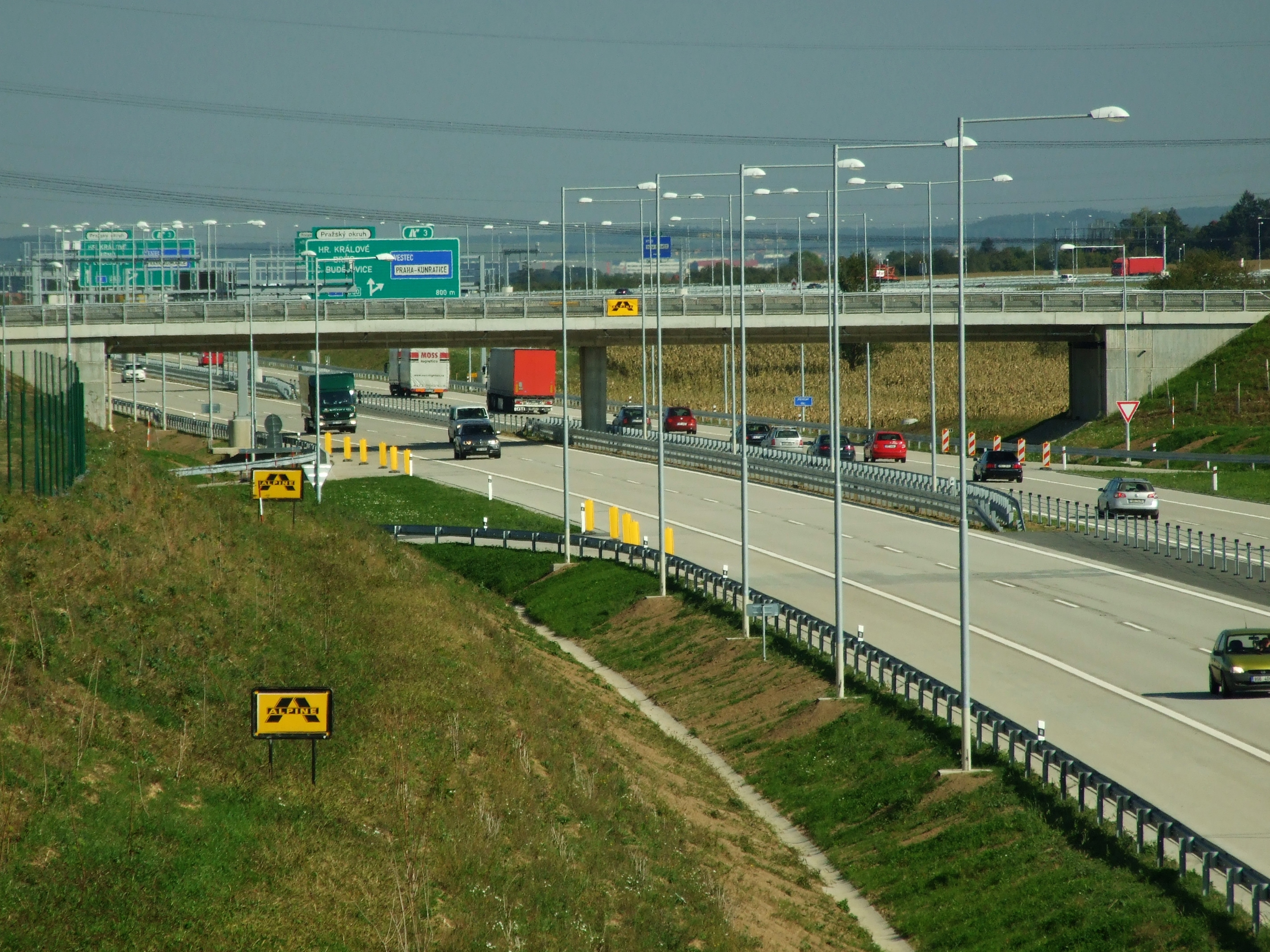
Cholupice section on the Southwest section of the D0

On 20 September 2010, the 23 km section between Slivenec and the D1 motorway was officially opened and put into normal operation a day later. It also includes the Lochkovský Tunnel with a length of 1,659 metres and the Radotínský Bridge, the part of which over the Berounka Valley, with a length of 2,045 metres, is considered the longest bridge structure in the Czech Republic. In the part where the Radotín Bridge crosses the Vltava River, there is a suspended Lahovice cycle bridge. At the same time, the first part of the so-called Vestec Spur, which connects the Prague Ring Road at Písnice MÚK with the Vestec area, was opened and can be extended past the villages of Drazdy and Rozkoš to D1 motorway.

At the end of June 2010, ŘSD approved a schedule according to which the new 23 km long section from Slivenec to Jesenice was put into operation on 20 September 2010. On Saturday 18 September, an open day was to be held at the Lahovice flyover, but due to the incompleteness of the construction and troubleshooting, the programme was reduced to the section between the Cholupice tunnel and Hodkovice.

=== Vestec spur ===
A 1.6 km long section of the Vestecka Connector was opened in 2010 (at the same time as the opening of the section of the Prague Ring Road between the D1 motorway and Slivenec) between the Prague Ring Road (Písnice junction) and the roundabout with Vídeňská Street north of Vestec. The next section of the connector from Vídeňská Street to the D1 motorway is not currently under construction (2024).

=== South-eastern section ===
The construction of 12.6 kilometres (7.8 mi) long Běchovice - D1 segment started in December 2024 and should be completed by 2027. The estimated value of the construction is CZK 9.4 billion, another CZK 3 billion is to be spent on the purchase of land for the construction.

There has been significant opposition over the routing of this section as early as the 1970s. The Environmental Impact Assessment (EIA) was issued in November 2002, and the investment plan was issued in 2010. A zoning decision had already been issued, which was later revoked.

=== North-western section ===
The north-western part of the bypass in the section Ruzyně - Březiněves was prepared in many variants, the EIA documentation recommended for implementation the variant Ss (northern, Řežská) or variant J (southern, Suchdolská). The current Prague City Master Plan and the Master Plan of the large territorial unit of the Prague Region contain only Option J. This section is currently under planning, and is facing legal issues. The region filed a complaint, but the Supreme Administrative Court rejected it in April 2014 and upheld the Regional Court's decision, thus stopping the construction project in the Ruzyně - Březiněves - Satalice section.

== Junction lists ==
Legend:

- I/C - Interchange, I/S - Intersection, RSA - Rest and service area, OBR - Overhead bridge restaurant, R/R - Restaurant and rest plaza, L/B - Layby, V/P - Vista point, TN - tunnel, T/P - Toll plaza, BR - Bridge
- C - Cloverleaf, S - Stack, T-A - Trumpet-A, T-B - Trumpet-B, DT - Directional-T/Y, SDT - Semi-Directional-T/Y, P-Y - Partial-Y, D - Diamond, P-C - Partial cloverleaf, D-D - Diverging diamond, D-R - Direct ramp

Intersection		(planned) D3 / E55
	(3)	Vestec
		Písnice (under construction)
		Tunnel Komořany 1972 m
		Komořany (under construction)
		Radotínský most 2045 m
		Vltava
	(10)	Zbraslav R4
		Berounka
		Tunnel Lochkov 1661 m
		Lochkovský most 460 m
	(15)	Lochkov
	(16)	Slivenec
	(19)	Ořech
	(21)	Jinočany
	(23A)	Chrášťany
	(23)	Třebonice D5 / E50
	(26)	Řepy R6 / E48
	(23)	Třebonice
	(28)	Ruzyně R7
Intersection		Přední Kopanina (planned) R7
		Horoměřice (planned)
		Suchdol (planned)
		Tunnel Suchdol (planned)
		Rybářka (planned)
		Suchdol (planned)
		Vltava
		Čimice (planned)
		Ústecká (planned)
Intersection		Březiněves (planned) D8 / E55
		Třeboradice (planned)
		Přezletice (planned)
		Vinoř (planned)
	(58)	Satalice R10 / E65
	(59)	Chlumecká
	(60)	Horní Počernice D11 / E67
Intersection		Běchovice (planned) I/12
		Uhříněves (planned)
		Říčany (planned)
		Lipany (planned)
	(76)	Modletice D1 / E50
	(82)	Jesenice

== Gallery ==
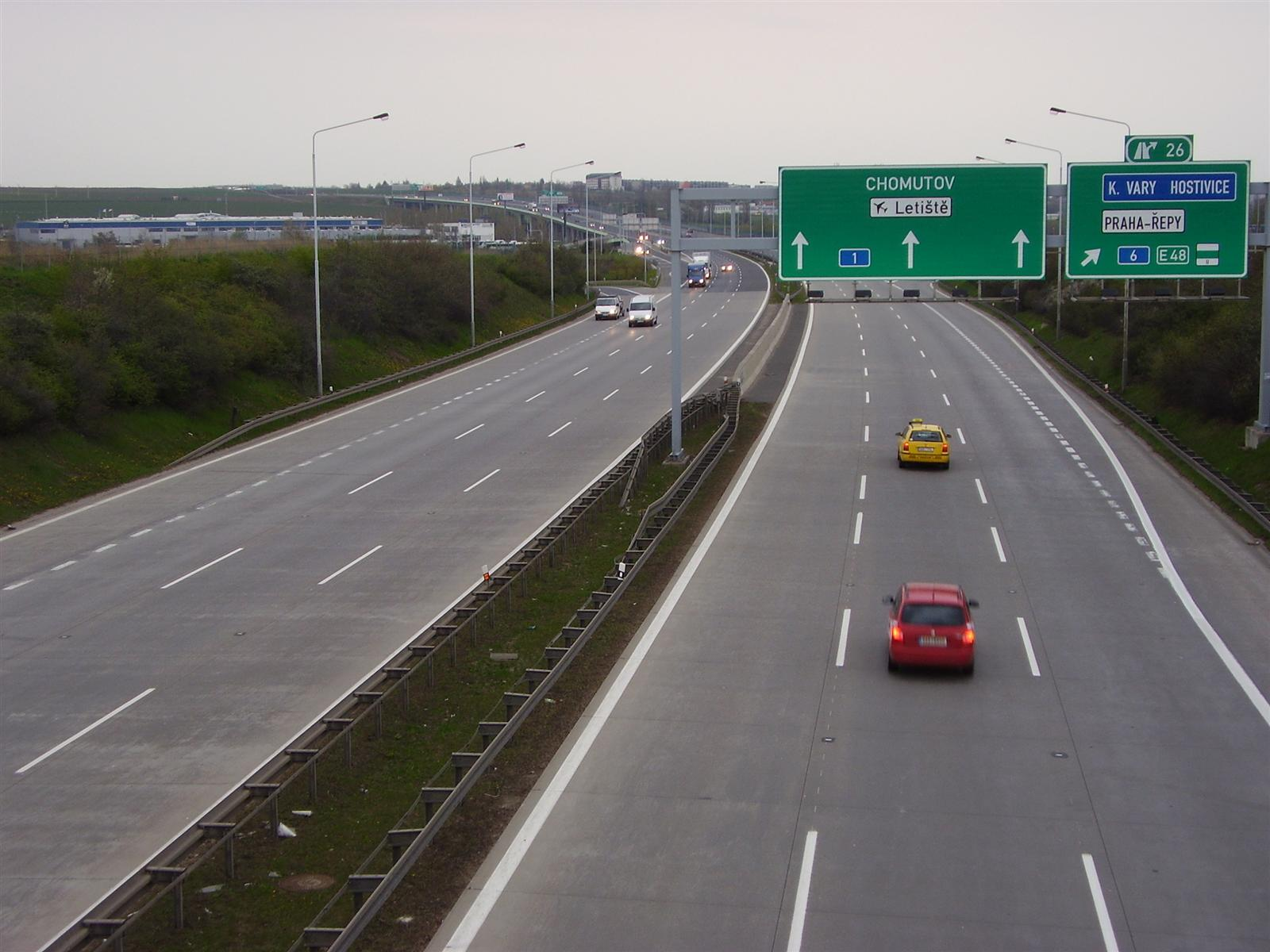
Motorway D0 near Prague-Zličín

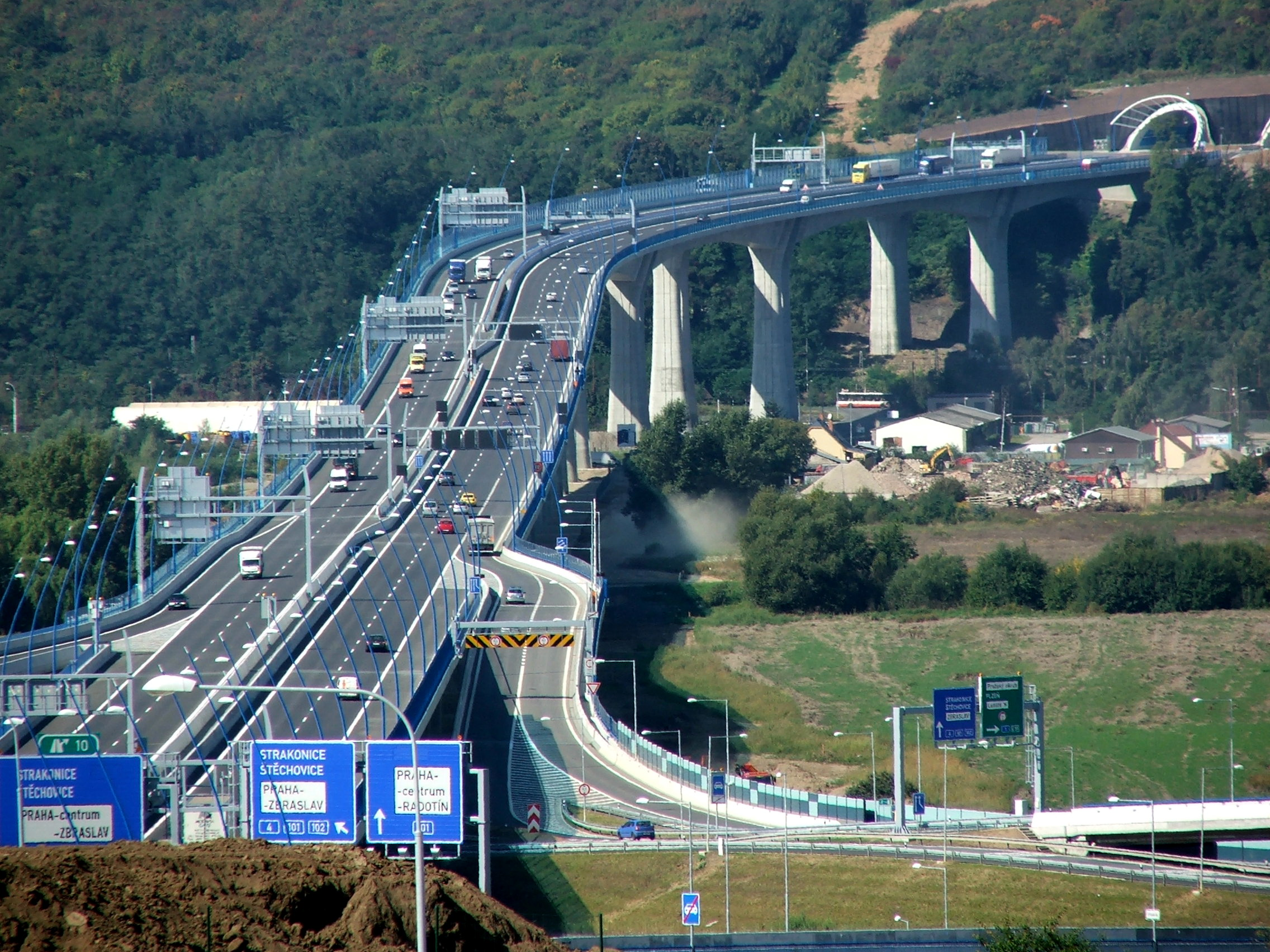
Bridge over Radotín.

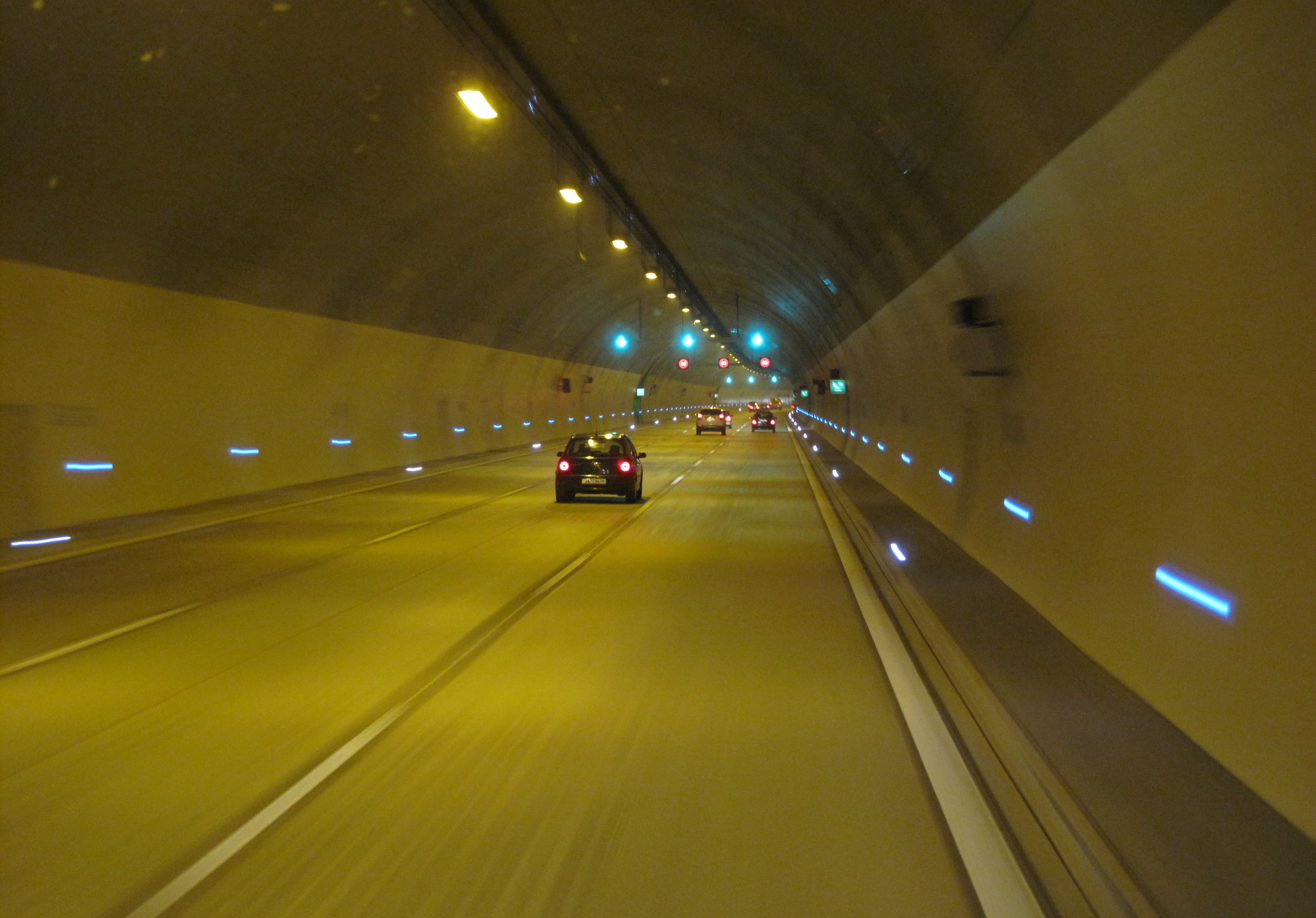
Komořany Tunnel.
