= Panenský Týnec =

- Market town
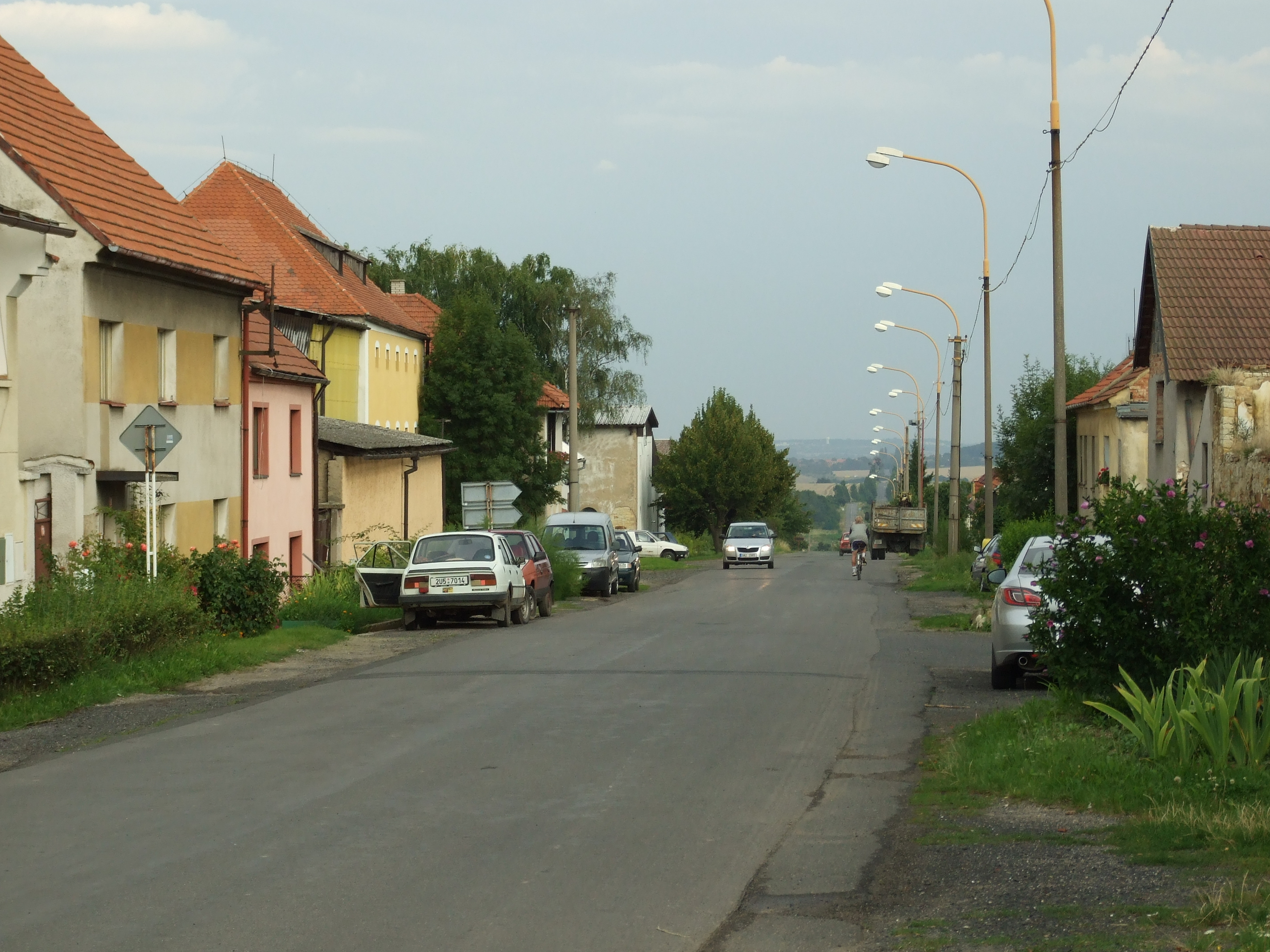
- Main street

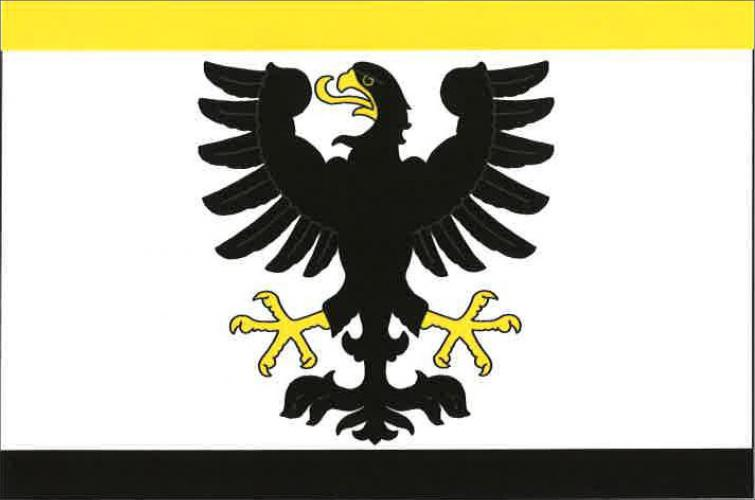
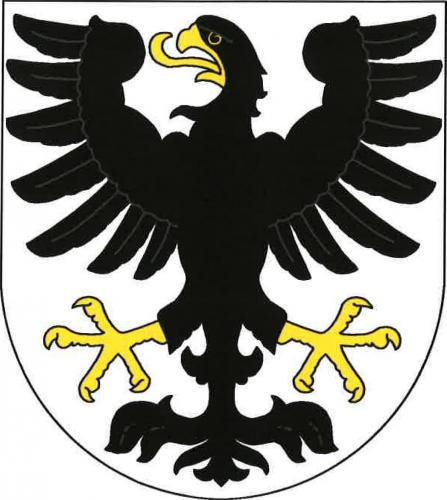
- Flag Coat of arms

- Location in the Czech Republic
- Coordinates: 50°17′42″N 13°55′1″E
- Country: Czech Republic
- Region: Ústí nad Labem
- District: Louny
- First mentioned: 1115

Area
  - Total: 6.13 km^{2} (2.37 sq mi)
- Elevation: 363 m (1,191 ft)

Population (2026-01-01)
  - Total: 458
  - Density: 74.7/km^{2} (194/sq mi)
- Time zone: UTC+1 (CET)
  - Summer (DST): UTC+2 (CEST)
- Postal code: 439 05
- Website: www.panenskytynec.cz

Panenský Týnec (Czech pronunciation: [ˈpanɛnskiː ˈtiːnɛts]; German: Jungfernteinitz) is a market town in Louny District in the Ústí nad Labem Region of the Czech Republic. It has about 500 inhabitants.

== Etymology ==
The initial name of the settlement was Týnec. Týnec is a diminutive of the Old Czech word týn (related to English 'town'), meaning 'fortified settlement'. In the 18th century, it was renamed to Panenský Týnec ("Virgin Týnec"), referring to the local abbey.

== Geography ==
Panenský Týnec is located about 10 kilometres (6 mi) southeast of Louny and 39 km (24 mi) northwest of Prague. It lies in an agricultural landscape in the Lower Ohře Table. The highest point is at 406 m (1,332 ft) above sea level.

== History ==
The first written mention of Panenský Týnec is from 1115, when the village was owned by the monastery in Kladruby. Sometime between 1239 and 1250, the village was rebuilt into a fortified market town. The abbey of the Order of Saint Clare was founded by the Žirotín family in 1321. In 1382, the market town was burned down, but it quickly recovered.

The Žirotín family owned Panenský Týnec to 1464, when the estate was acquired by the Lobkowicz family. The market town suffered greatly during the Thirty Years' War. The damaged abbey was reconstructed in 1636 and served its purpose until its abolishment in 1782. Between 1727 and 1785, the market town began to grow beyond the town walls. The town gates were demolished in 1799, when the imperial road was constructed.

== Demographics ==
Historical population

Year	Pop.	±%
1869	799	—
1880	850	+6.4%
1890	772	−9.2%
1900	787	+1.9%
1910	752	−4.4%

Year	Pop.	±%
1921	715	−4.9%
1930	657	−8.1%
1950	492	−25.1%
1961	500	+1.6%
1970	469	−6.2%

Year	Pop.	±%
1980	425	−9.4%
1991	378	−11.1%
2001	378	+0.0%
2011	409	+8.2%
2021	415	+1.5%

Source: Censuses

== Transport ==
The D7 motorway from Prague to Chomutov runs through the municipality.

== Sights ==
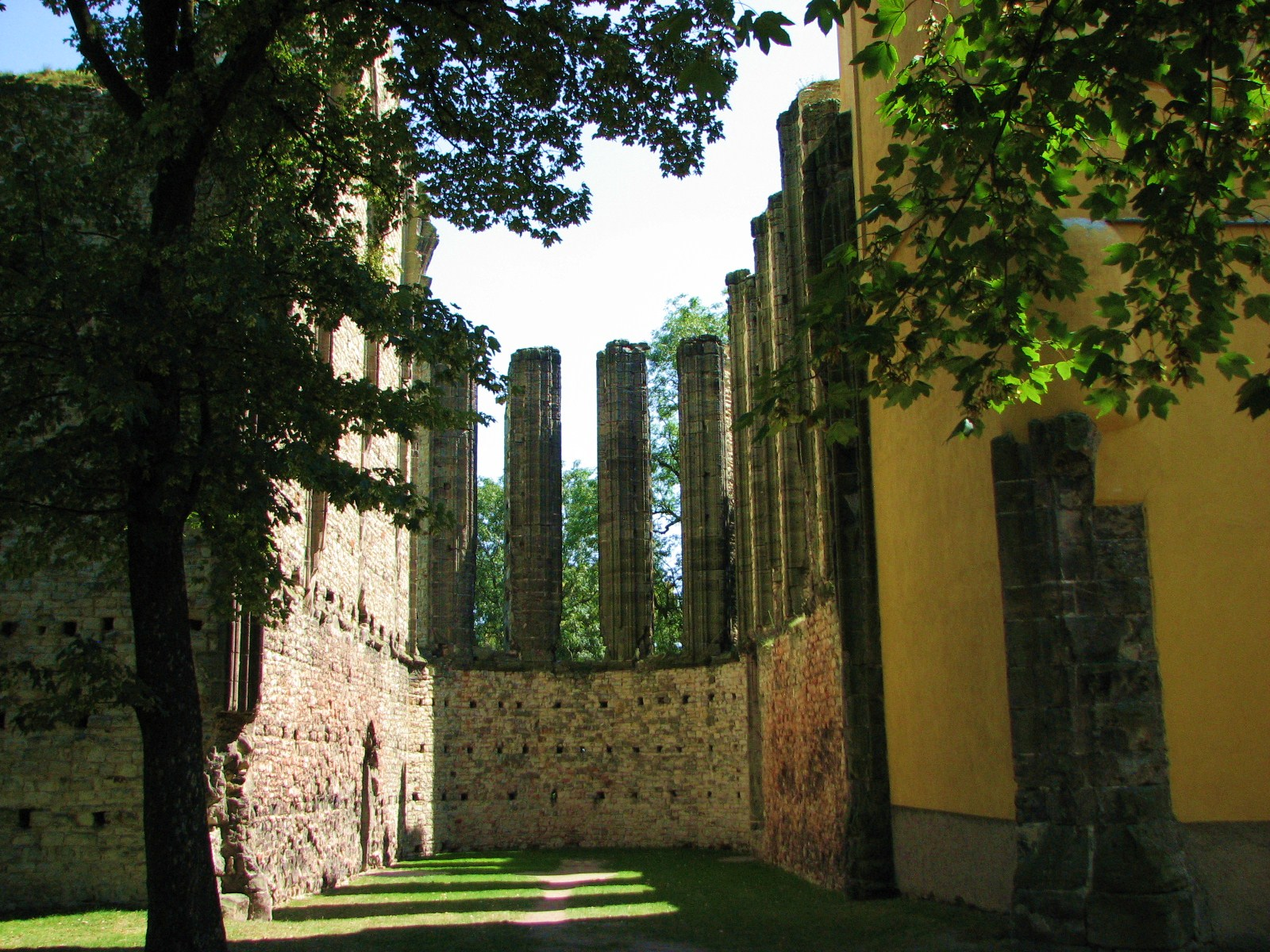
Unfinished Church of the Virgin Mary

The main tourist destination is the complex of the former abbey. The abbey was founded in 1321. Today the main building of the abbey houses the municipal office. The main feature of the complex is the unfinished Church of the Virgin Mary, whose construction was interrupted by a fire in 1382. Next to the church is a Baroque bell tower dating from 1747. The area also includes a park. A castle used to be here, but it was demolished in 1971.

Among the main landmarks of Panenský Týnec is the Church of Saint George. It was built in the Baroque style in 1722.
