= Knovíz =

- Municipality
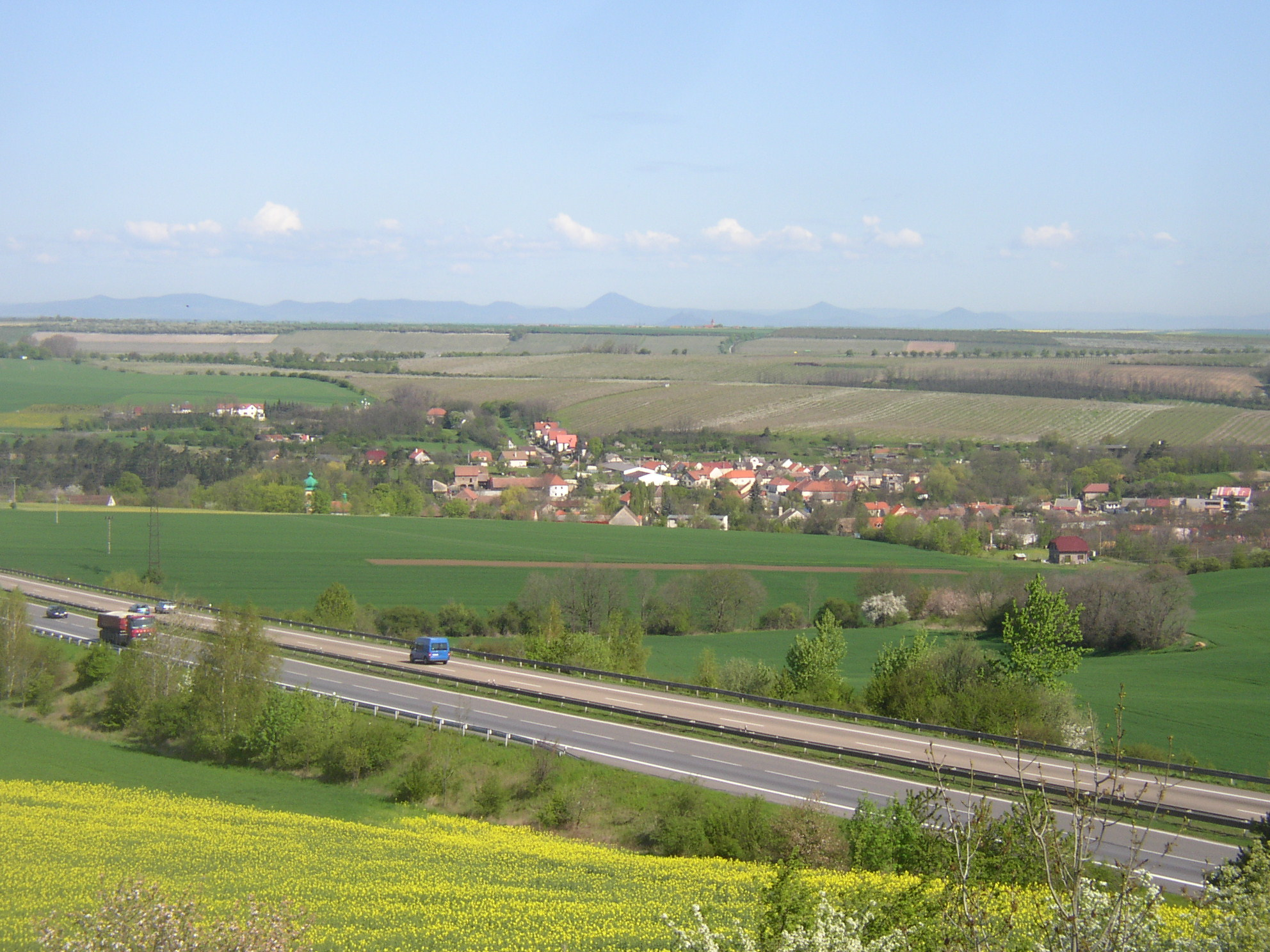
- View from the south

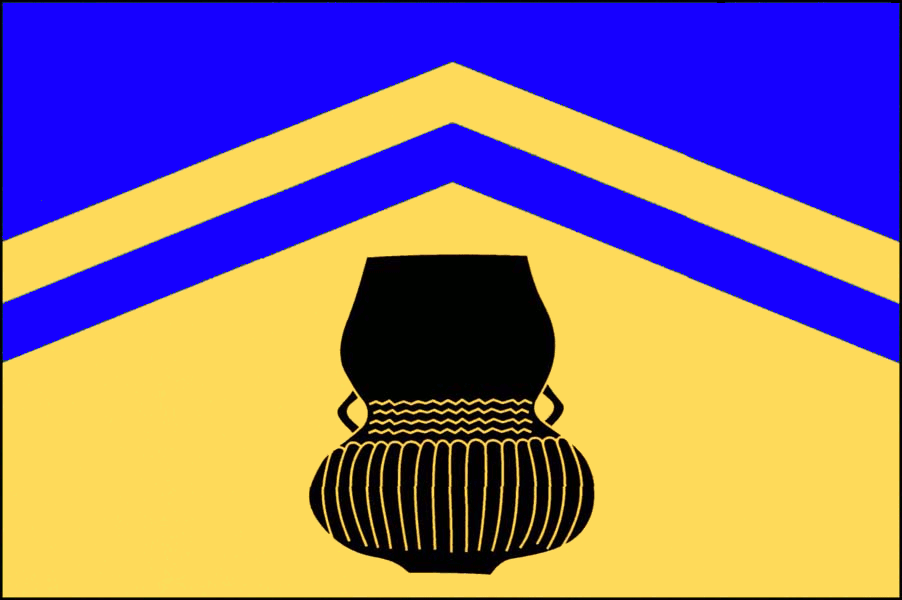
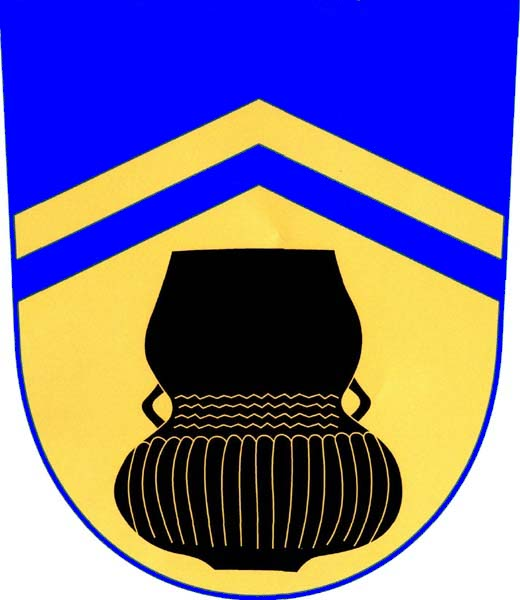
- Flag Coat of arms

- Location in the Czech Republic
- Coordinates: 50°12′46″N 14°8′13″E
- Country: Czech Republic
- Region: Central Bohemian
- District: Kladno
- First mentioned: 1088

Area
  - Total: 4.23 km^{2} (1.63 sq mi)
- Elevation: 228 m (748 ft)

Population (2026-01-01)
  - Total: 604
  - Density: 143/km^{2} (370/sq mi)
- Time zone: UTC+1 (CET)
  - Summer (DST): UTC+2 (CEST)
- Postal code: 274 01
- Website: www.knoviz.cz

Knovíz (Czech pronunciation: [ˈknoviːs]) is a municipality and village in Kladno District in the Central Bohemian Region of the Czech Republic. It has about 600 inhabitants. It gave its name to the Knovíz culture.

== Etymology ==
The name is derived from the personal name Knovid, meaning "Knovid's (court)".

== Geography ==
Knovíz is located about 7 kilometres (4 mi) north of Kladno and 20 km (12 mi) northwest of Prague. It lies in an agricultural landscape in the Prague Plateau. The highest point is at 332 m (1,089 ft) above sea level.

== History ==
The territory of today's Knovíz was inhabited already in the Neolithic period, which is proven by finds dating back about 6000 years. The Knovíz culture, an archaeological culture of Bronze Age, is named after this site.

The first written mention of Knovíz is from 1088, when King Vratislaus II donated the village to the Vyšehrad Chapter. Among the most notable owners of the village were the Schwarzenberg family.

== Demographics ==
Historical population

Year	Pop.	±%
1869	399	—
1880	428	+7.3%
1890	488	+14.0%
1900	605	+24.0%
1910	745	+23.1%

Year	Pop.	±%
1921	695	−6.7%
1930	737	+6.0%
1950	643	−12.8%
1961	602	−6.4%
1970	543	−9.8%

Year	Pop.	±%
1980	477	−12.2%
1991	456	−4.4%
2001	509	+11.6%
2011	549	+7.9%
2021	570	+3.8%

Source: Censuses

== Transport ==
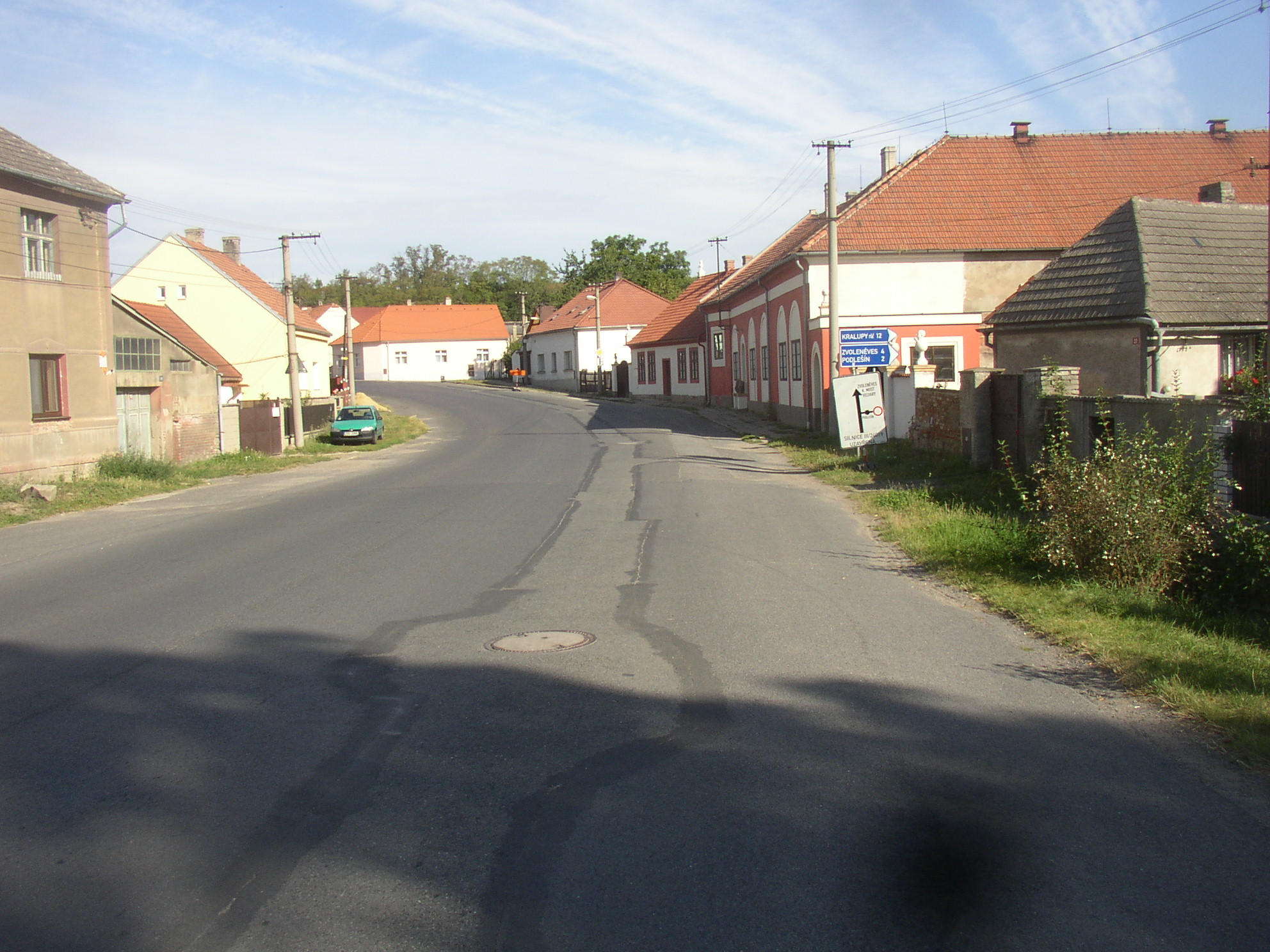
Centre of Knovíz

The D7 motorway from Prague to Chomutov runs through the municipality.

The railway line Louny–Kralupy nad Vltavou passes through the municipality, but there is no train stop. The municipality is served by the stop in neighbouring Podlešín.

== Sights ==
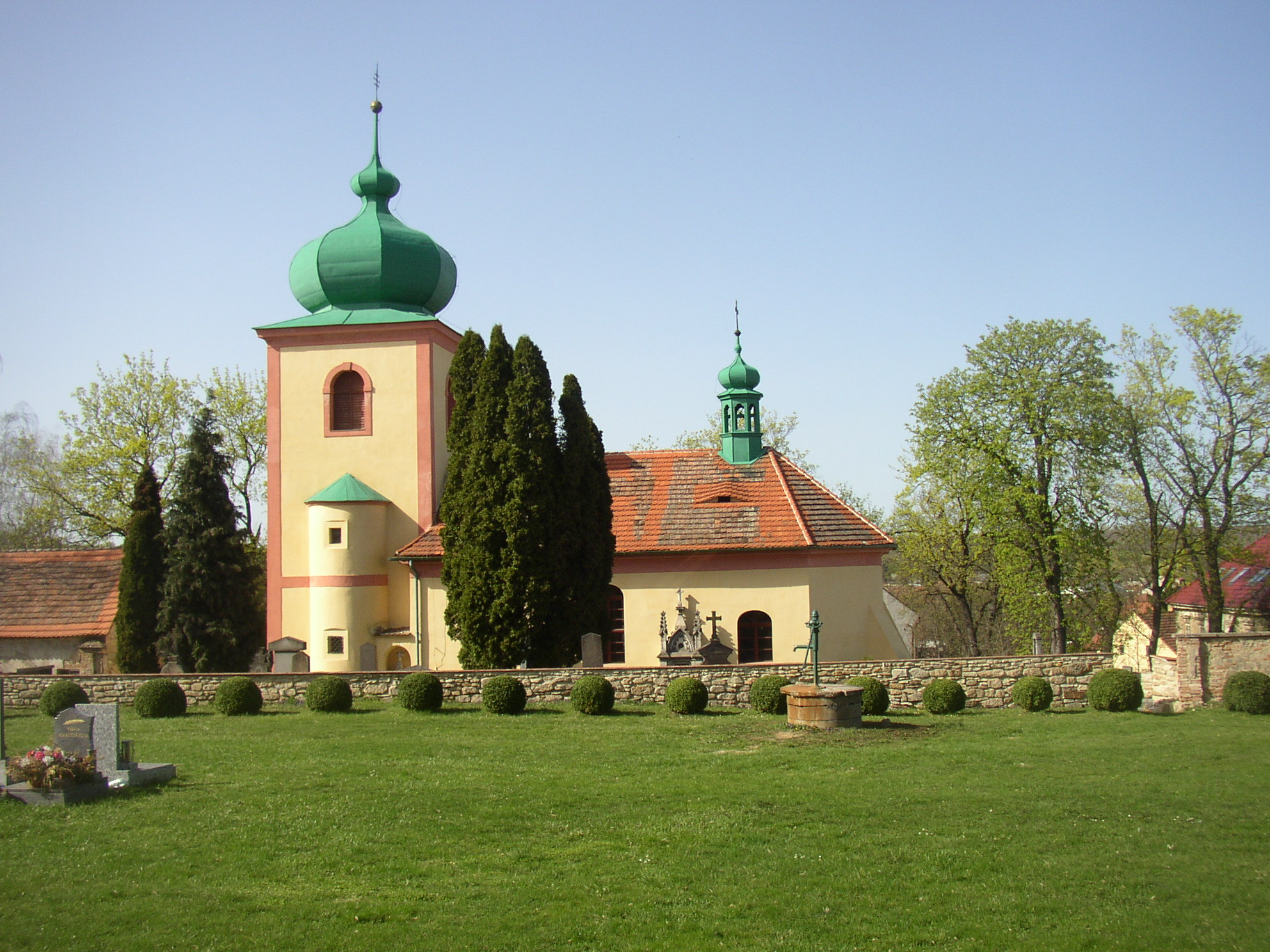
Church of All Saints

The main landmark of Knovíz is the Church of All Saints. It was originally an early Gothic building from the 14th century. The massive tower was added in the 18th century. The church was completely rebuilt in the 19th century. Next to the church is Hus' Pulpit, a sandstone formation where, according to legend, Jan Hus preached on his way to Konstanz.

== Notable people ==
- Alois Pravoslav Trojan (1815–1893), lawyer and politician
- Jan Švankmajer (born 1934), filmmaker and artist; had a studio here
