= Mutějovice =

- Municipality
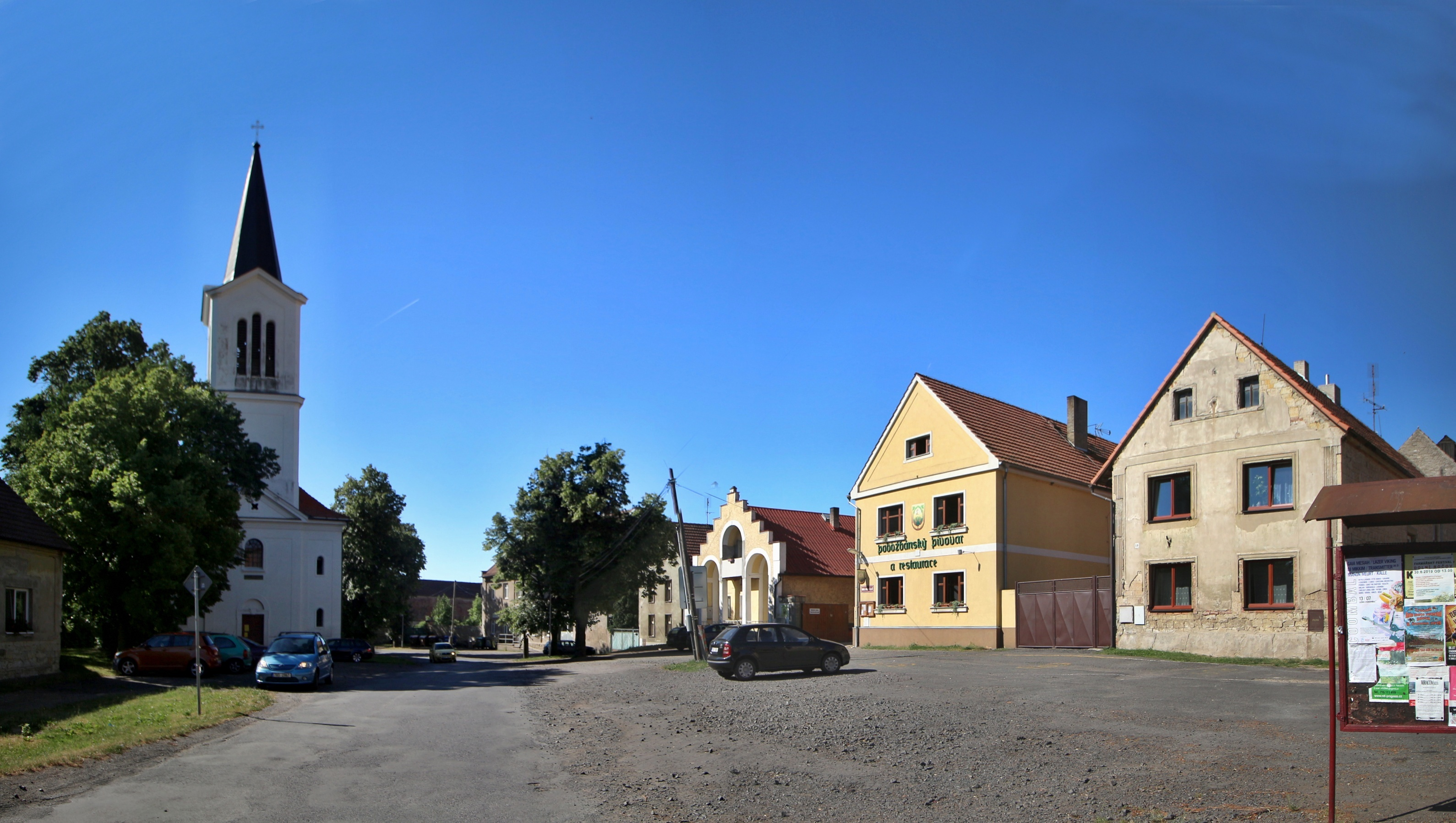
- Centre with Church of Saint Wenceslaus

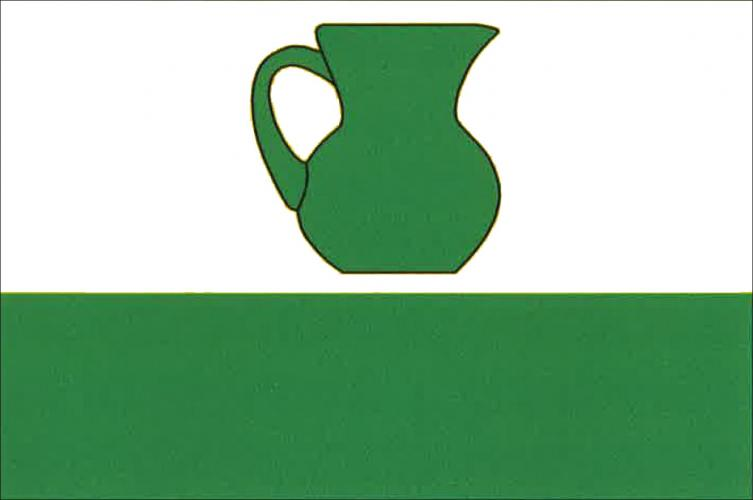
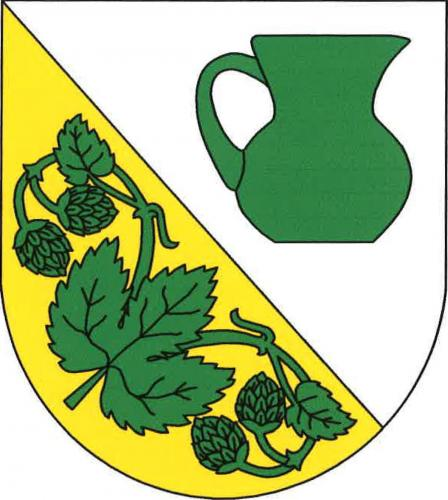
- Flag Coat of arms

- Location in the Czech Republic
- Coordinates: 50°11′40″N 13°42′35″E
- Country: Czech Republic
- Region: Central Bohemian
- District: Rakovník
- First mentioned: 1337

Area
  - Total: 13.21 km^{2} (5.10 sq mi)
- Elevation: 386 m (1,266 ft)

Population (2026-01-01)
  - Total: 855
  - Density: 64.7/km^{2} (168/sq mi)
- Time zone: UTC+1 (CET)
  - Summer (DST): UTC+2 (CEST)
- Postal code: 270 07
- Website: www.mutejovice.cz

Mutějovice is a municipality and village in Rakovník District in the Central Bohemian Region of the Czech Republic. It has about 900 inhabitants.

== Administrative division ==
Mutějovice consists of two municipal parts (in brackets population according to the 2021 census):

- Mutějovice (701)
- Lhota pod Džbánem (65)

== Demographics ==
Historical population
Year	Pop.	±%
1869	1,093	—
1880	1,214	+11.1%
1890	1,199	−1.2%
1900	1,315	+9.7%
1910	1,332	+1.3%
1921	1,534	+15.2%
1930	1,494	−2.6%
1950	1,135	−24.0%
1961	1,060	−6.6%
1970	940	−11.3%
1980	822	−12.6%
1991	693	−15.7%
2001	759	+9.5%
2011	804	+5.9%
2021	766	−4.7%
Source: Censuses
