= Chlumčany (Louny District) =

- Municipality
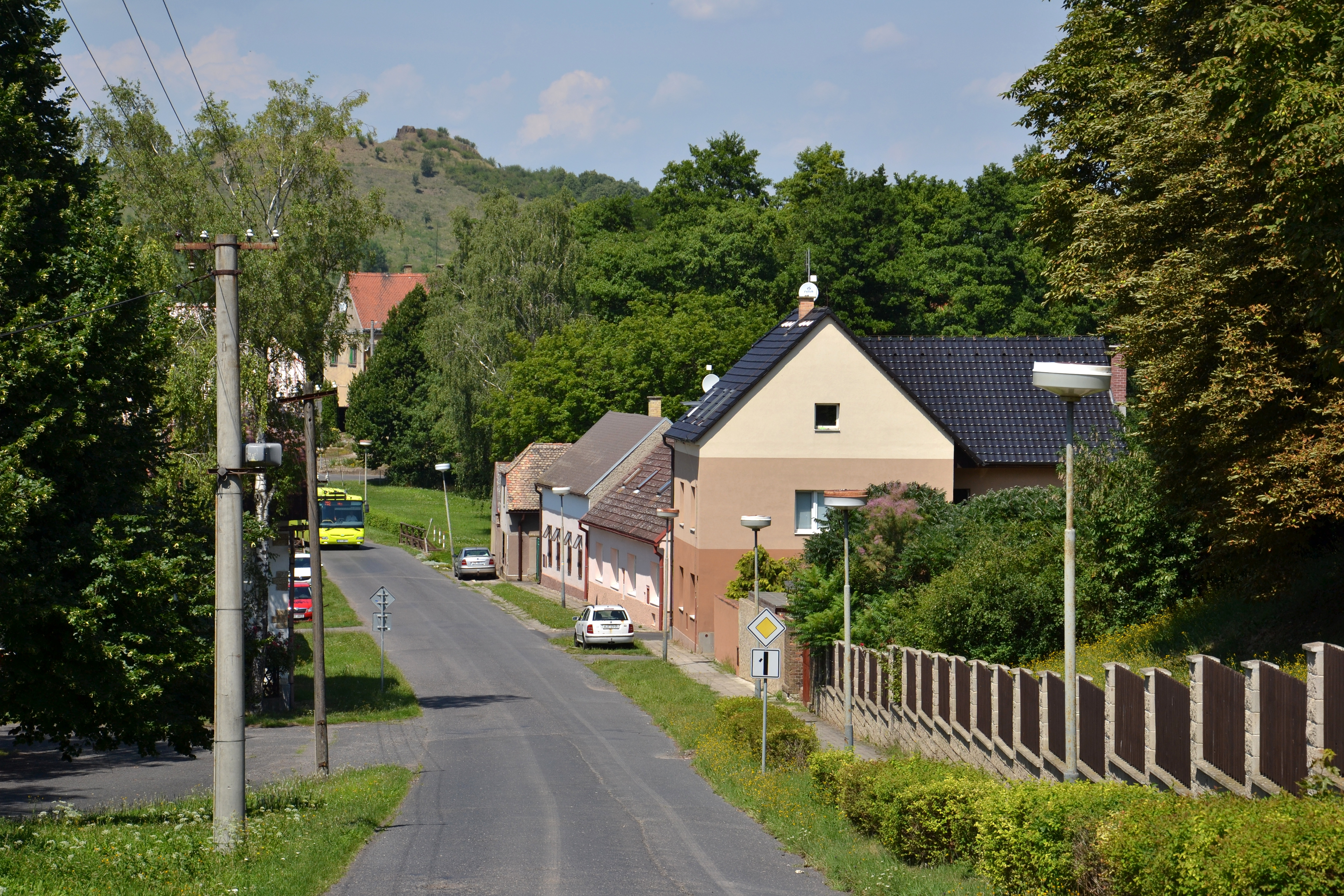
- A road in Chlumčany

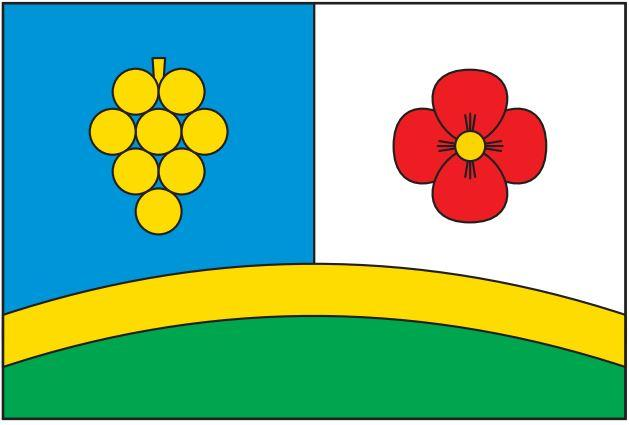
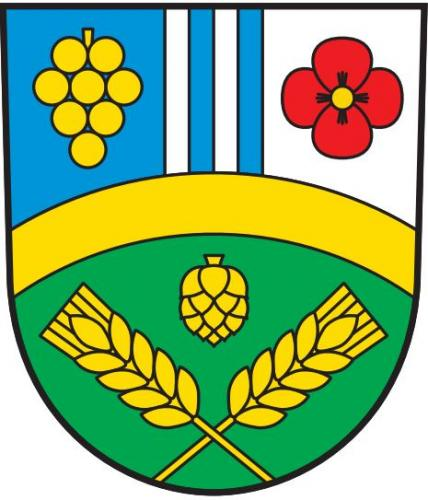
- Flag Coat of arms

- Location in the Czech Republic
- Coordinates: 50°20′6″N 13°50′36″E
- Country: Czech Republic
- Region: Ústí nad Labem
- District: Louny
- First mentioned: 1316

Area
  - Total: 5.26 km^{2} (2.03 sq mi)
- Elevation: 236 m (774 ft)

Population (2026-01-01)
  - Total: 591
  - Density: 112/km^{2} (291/sq mi)
- Time zone: UTC+1 (CET)
  - Summer (DST): UTC+2 (CEST)
- Postal codes: 439 03, 440 01
- Website: www.chlumcanyavlci.cz

Chlumčany (German: Klumtschan) is a municipality and village in Louny District in the Ústí nad Labem Region of the Czech Republic. It has about 600 inhabitants.

== Administrative division ==
Chlumčany consists of two municipal parts (in brackets population according to the 2021 census):

- Chlumčany (362)
- Vlčí (193)

== Demographics ==
Historical population
Year	Pop.	±%
1869	543	—
1880	615	+13.3%
1890	769	+25.0%
1900	895	+16.4%
1910	1,019	+13.9%
1921	988	−3.0%
1930	976	−1.2%
1950	717	−26.5%
1961	755	+5.3%
1970	659	−12.7%
1980	525	−20.3%
1991	419	−20.2%
2001	480	+14.6%
2011	507	+5.6%
2021	555	+9.5%
Source: Censuses

== Notable people ==
- Miroslav Šubrt (1926–2012), ice hockey executive
