= Bakovský potok =

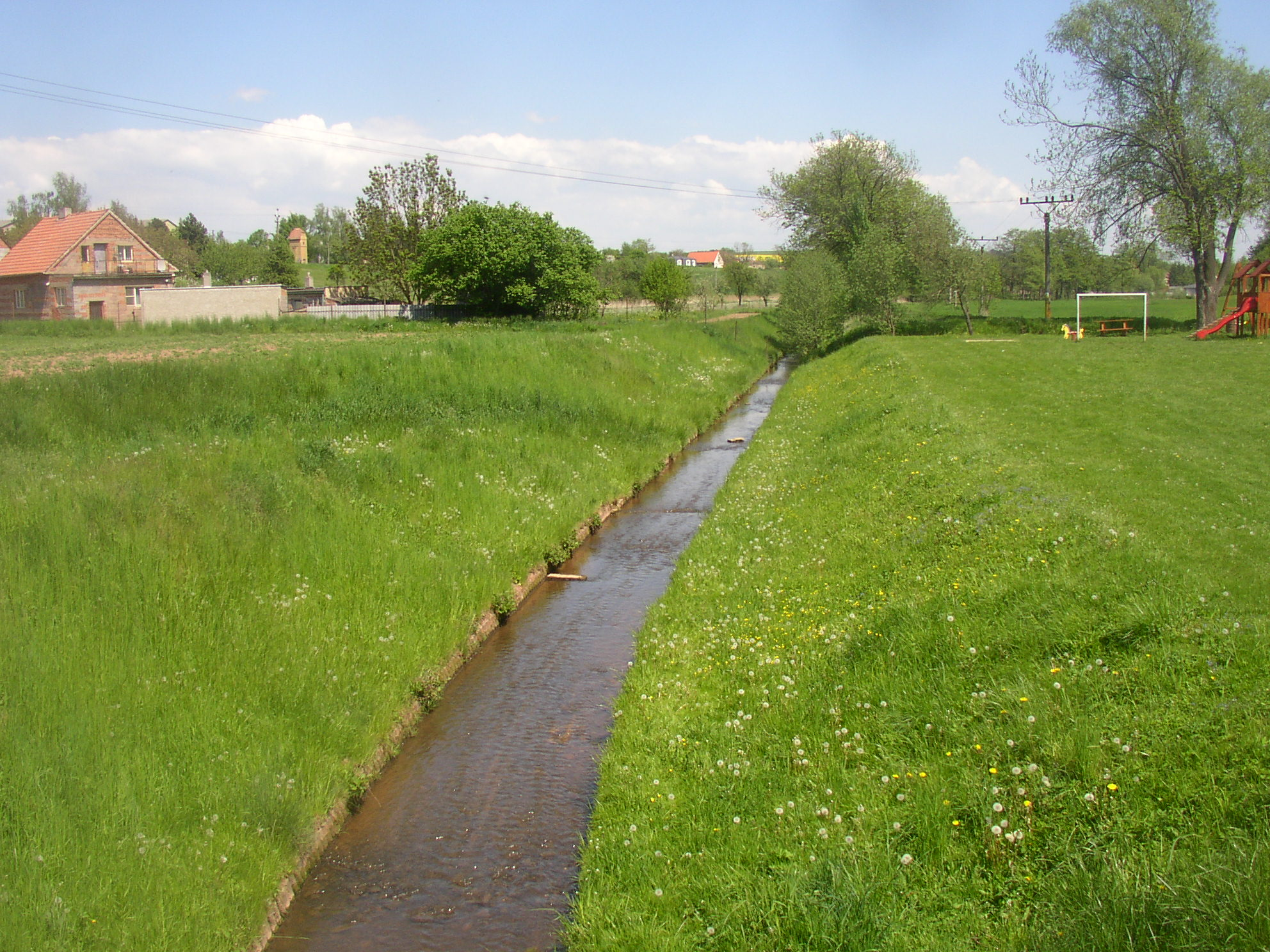
- The Bakovský potok in Kutrovice

Location
- Country: Czech Republic
- Region: Central Bohemian

Physical characteristics
- Source
  - location: Kalivody, Džbán
  - coordinates: 50°12′19″N 13°48′9″E
  - elevation: 485 m (1,591 ft)
- Mouth
  - location: Vltava
  - coordinates: 50°18′31″N 14°19′35″E
  - elevation: 163 m (535 ft)
- Length: 44.6 km (27.7 mi)
- Basin size: 416.7 km^{2} (160.9 sq mi)
- Discharge
  - average: 1.15 m^{3}/s (41 cu ft/s) near estuary

Basin features
- Progression: Vltava→ Elbe→ North Sea

The Bakovský potok is a stream in the Czech Republic, a left tributary of the Vltava River. It flows through the Central Bohemian Region. It is 44.6 km (27.7 mi) long.

== Etymology ==
The name means "Bakov stream". Bakov is a village within the Beřovice municipality in the middle course of the stream.

== Characteristic ==
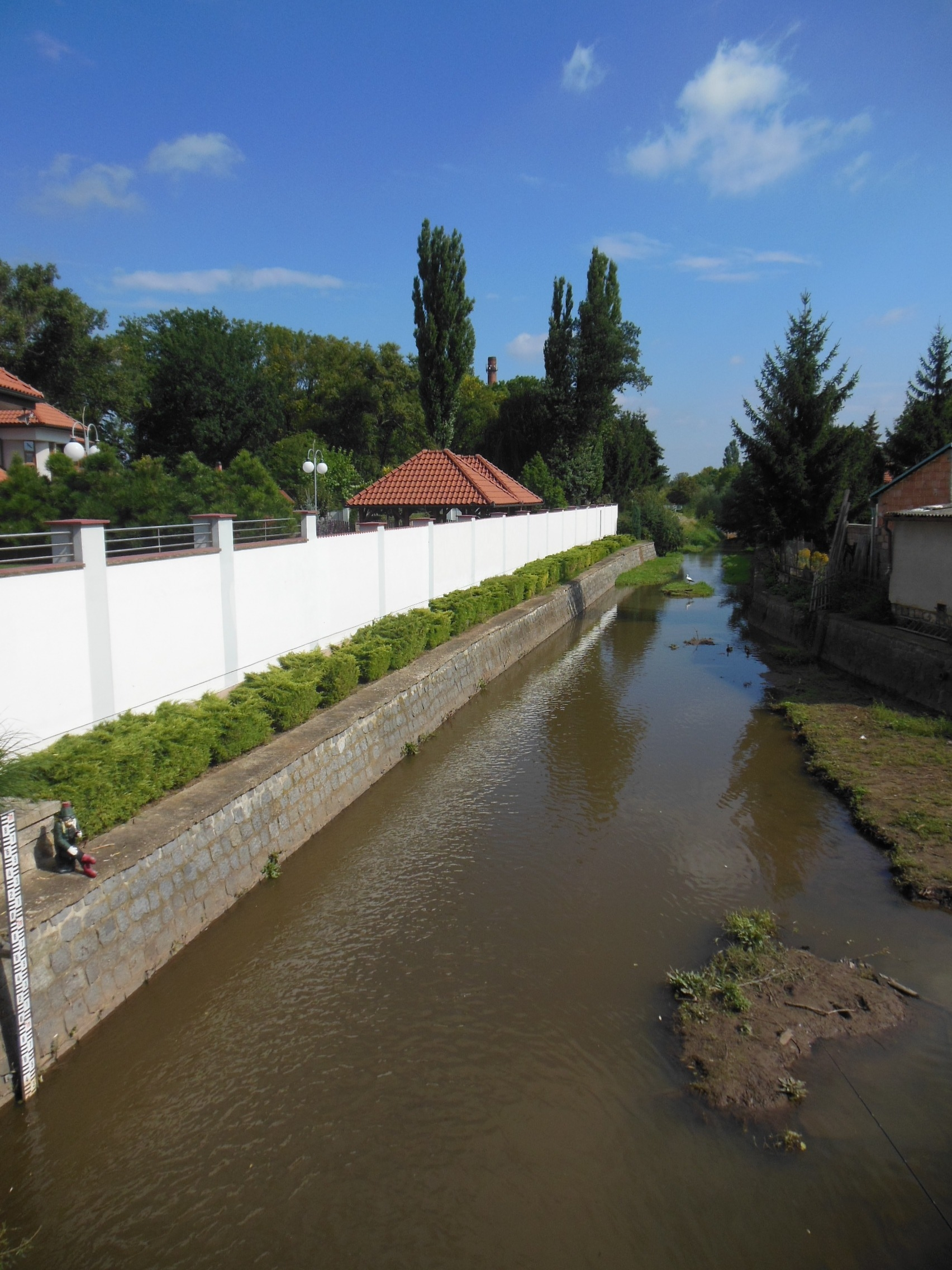
The Bakovský potok in Velvary

The Bakovský potok originates in the territory of Kalivody in the Džbán range at an elevation of 485 m (1,591 ft) and flows to Nová Ves, where it enters the Vltava River at an elevation of 163 m (535 ft). It is 44.6 km (27.7 mi) long. Its drainage basin has an area of 416.7 km^{2} (160.9 sq mi).

The longest tributaries of the Bakovský potok are:

| Tributary | Length (km) | Side |
|---|---|---|
| Zlonický potok | 26.4 | left |
| Červený potok | 24.4 | right |
| Vranský potok | 22.2 | left |
| Byseňský potok | 13.7 | right |
| Hřešický potok | 8.2 | left |

== Course ==
The most populated settlement on the stream is the town of Velvary. The stream flows through the municipal territories of Kalivody, Bdín, Srbeč, Pozdeň, Plchov, Kvílice, Kutrovice, Neprobylice, Královice, Dřínov, Beřovice, Hobšovice, Černuc, Velvary, Chržín, Uhy, Sazená and Nová Ves.

== Bodies of water ==
There are 211 bodies of water in the basin area. The largest of them is the fishpond Blahotický rybník II with an area of 16.2 ha (40 acres), built on the Červený potok. The Bakovský potok supplies several fishponds which are located evenly throughout its course.

== Bridges ==
In Královice, the stream is crossed by a Baroque stone arch bridge, protected as a cultural monument. The bridge was built shortly after 1871 and is decorated with statues of saints Wenceslaus and John of Nepomuk.

== See also ==
- List of rivers of the Czech Republic
