= Dřínov =

Dřínov may refer to places in the Czech Republic:

- Dřínov (Kladno District), a municipality and village in the Central Bohemian Region
- Dřínov (Kroměříž District), a municipality and village in the Zlín Region
- Dřínov (Mělník District), a municipality and village in the Central Bohemian Region
