= Vepřek =

Vepřek may refer to:

- Michal Vepřek (born 1985), Czech footballer
- Vepřek, a village and administrative part of Nová Ves (Mělník District) in the Czech Republic
  - Vepřek Solar Park, a power plant in Vepřek
