= Královice =

Královice may refer to places in the Czech Republic:

- Královice (Kladno District), a municipality and village in the Central Bohemian Region
- Královice (Prague), a municipal part of Prague

== See also ==
- Kralovice (disambiguation)
