= Bdin =

Bdin may refer to:

- Vidin, historically known as Bdin, a city in Bulgaria
- OFC Bdin Vidin, a Bulgarian football club
- Bdín, a village in the Czech Republic
