= Kralovice (disambiguation) =

Kralovice is a town in the Plzeň Region of the Czech Republic.

Kralovice or Královice may also refer to places in the Czech Republic:

- Královice (Kladno District), a municipality and village in the Central Bohemian Region
- Dolní Kralovice, a municipality and village in the Central Bohemian Region
- Královice (Prague), a municipal part of Prague
