= Kutrovice =

- Municipality
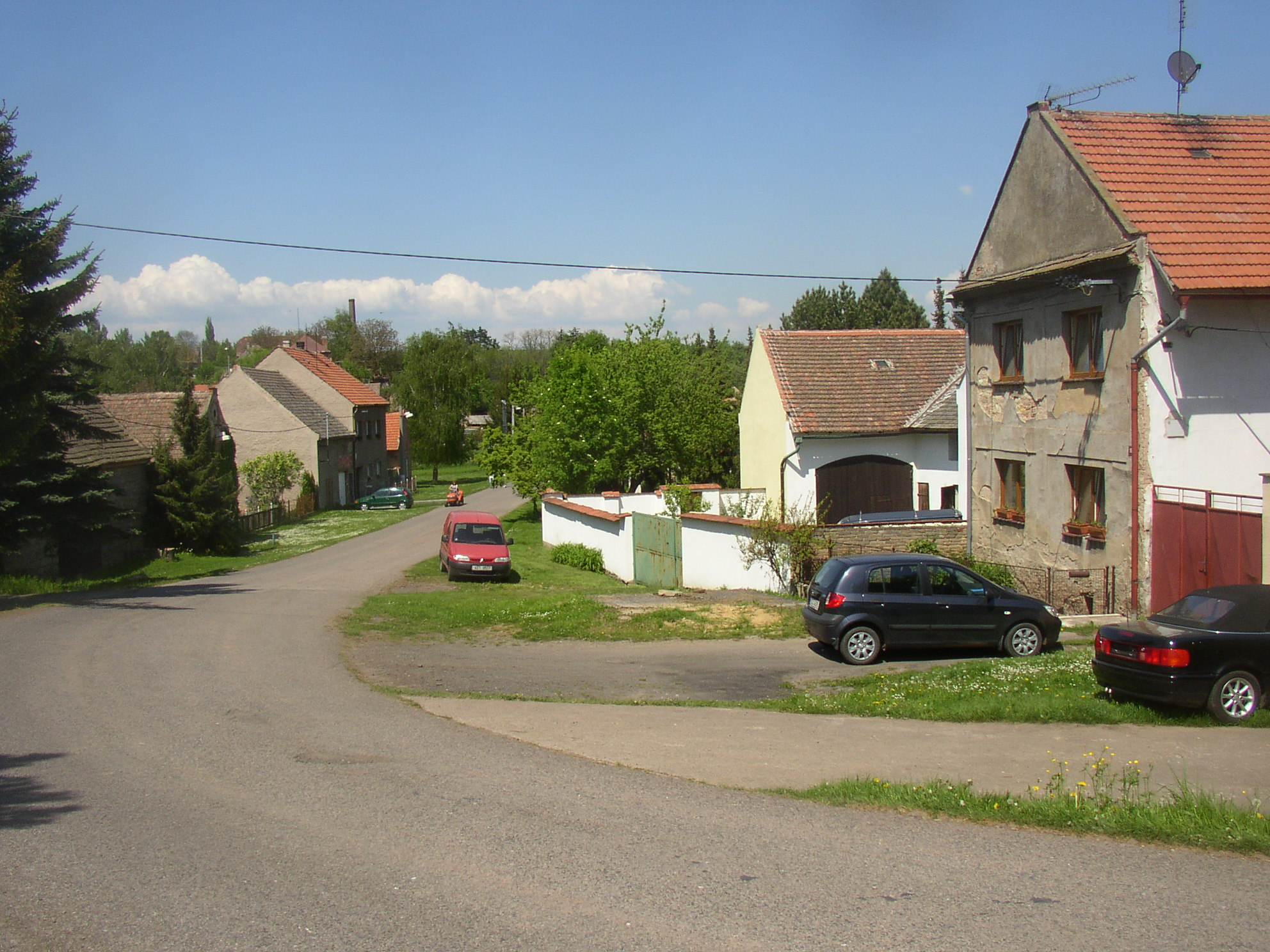
- Main street in the southern part

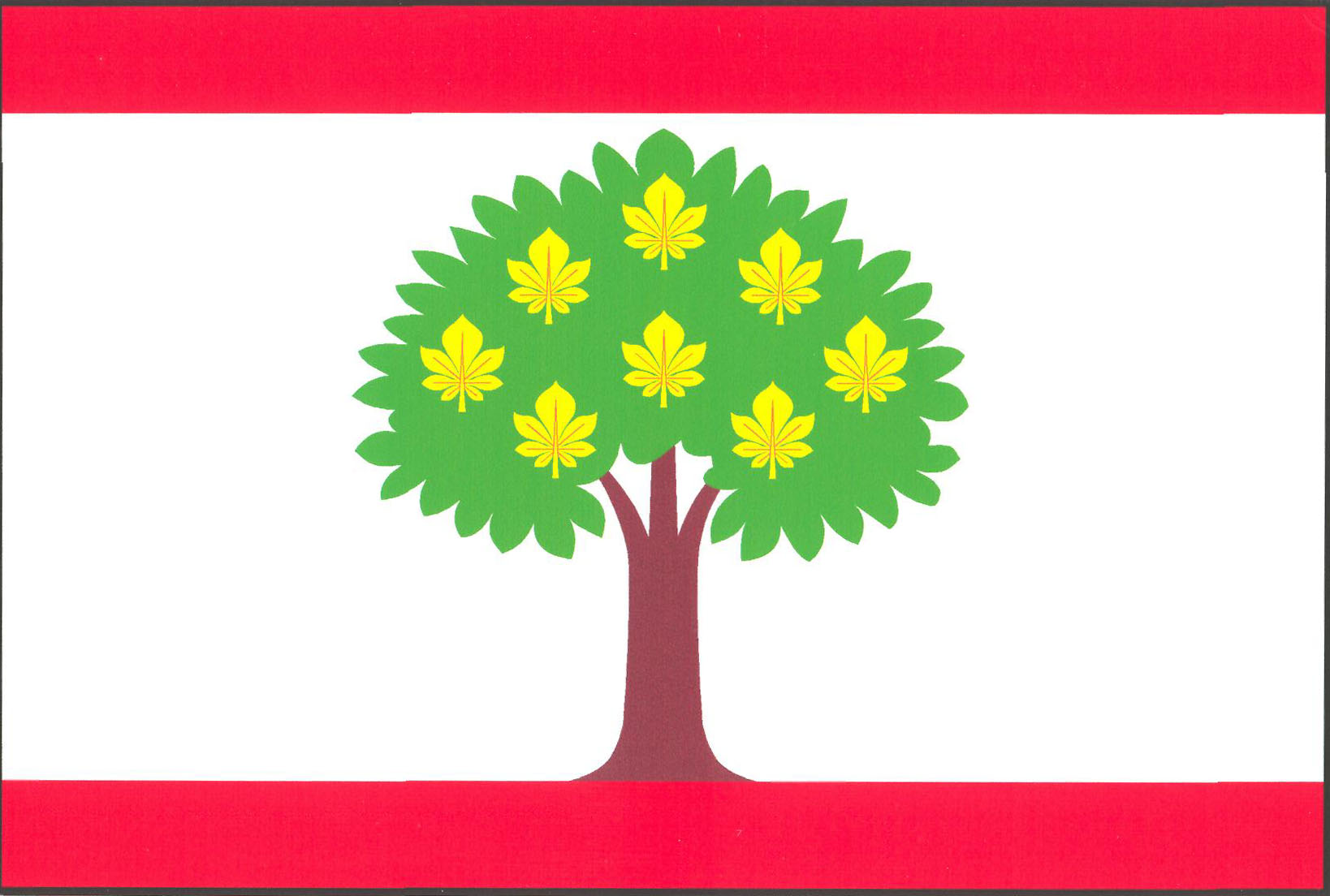
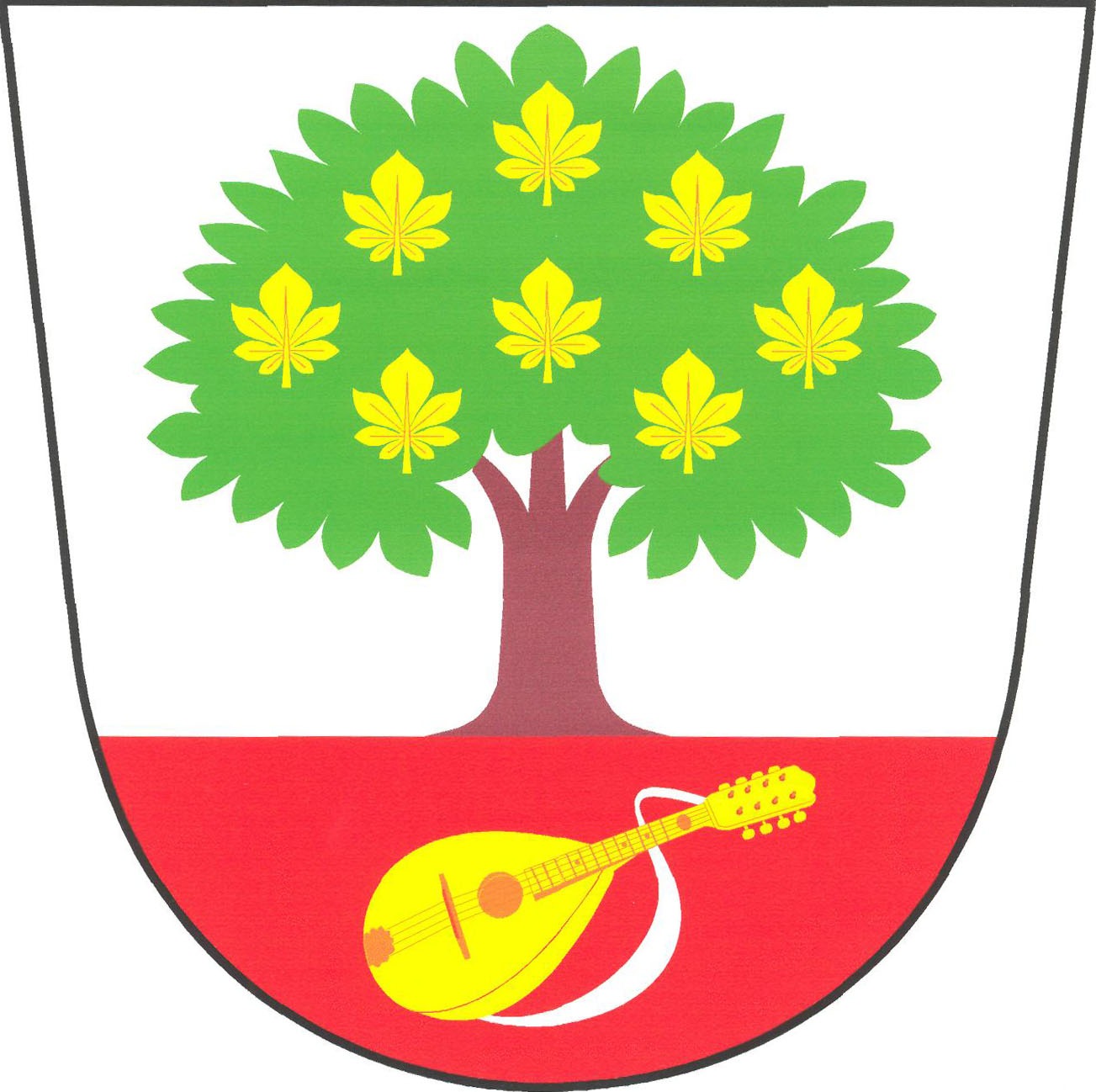
- Flag Coat of arms

- Location in the Czech Republic
- Coordinates: 50°15′42″N 14°1′8″E
- Country: Czech Republic
- Region: Central Bohemian
- District: Kladno
- First mentioned: 1366

Area
  - Total: 1.49 km^{2} (0.58 sq mi)
- Elevation: 260 m (850 ft)

Population (2026-01-01)
  - Total: 108
  - Density: 72.5/km^{2} (188/sq mi)
- Time zone: UTC+1 (CET)
  - Summer (DST): UTC+2 (CEST)
- Postal code: 273 75
- Website: www.kutrovice.cz

Kutrovice (Czech pronunciation: [ˈkutrovɪtsɛ]) is a municipality and village in Kladno District in the Central Bohemian Region of the Czech Republic. It has about 100 inhabitants.

== Etymology ==
The name is derived from the personal name Kutra, meaning "the village of Kutra's people".

== Geography ==
Kutrovice is located about 14 kilometres (9 mi) north of Kladno and 31 km (19 mi) northwest of Prague. It lies in an agricultural landscape in the Lower Ohře Table. The highest point is at 316 m (1,037 ft) above sea level. The stream Bakovský potok flows through the municipality.

== History ==
The first written mention of Kutrovice is from 1366.

== Demographics ==
Historical population

| Year | Pop. | ±% |
|---|---|---|
| 1869 | 195 | — |
| 1880 | 212 | +8.7% |
| 1890 | 218 | +2.8% |
| 1900 | 224 | +2.8% |
| 1910 | 220 | −1.8% |

| Year | Pop. | ±% |
|---|---|---|
| 1921 | 244 | +10.9% |
| 1930 | 242 | −0.8% |
| 1950 | 163 | −32.6% |
| 1961 | 151 | −7.4% |
| 1970 | 127 | −15.9% |

| Year | Pop. | ±% |
|---|---|---|
| 1980 | 100 | −21.3% |
| 1991 | 83 | −17.0% |
| 2001 | 95 | +14.5% |
| 2011 | 106 | +11.6% |
| 2021 | 114 | +7.5% |

Source: Censuses

== Transport ==
The I/7 road from Prague to Chomutov, which replaces the unfinished section of the D7 motorway, runs through the municipality.

== Sights ==
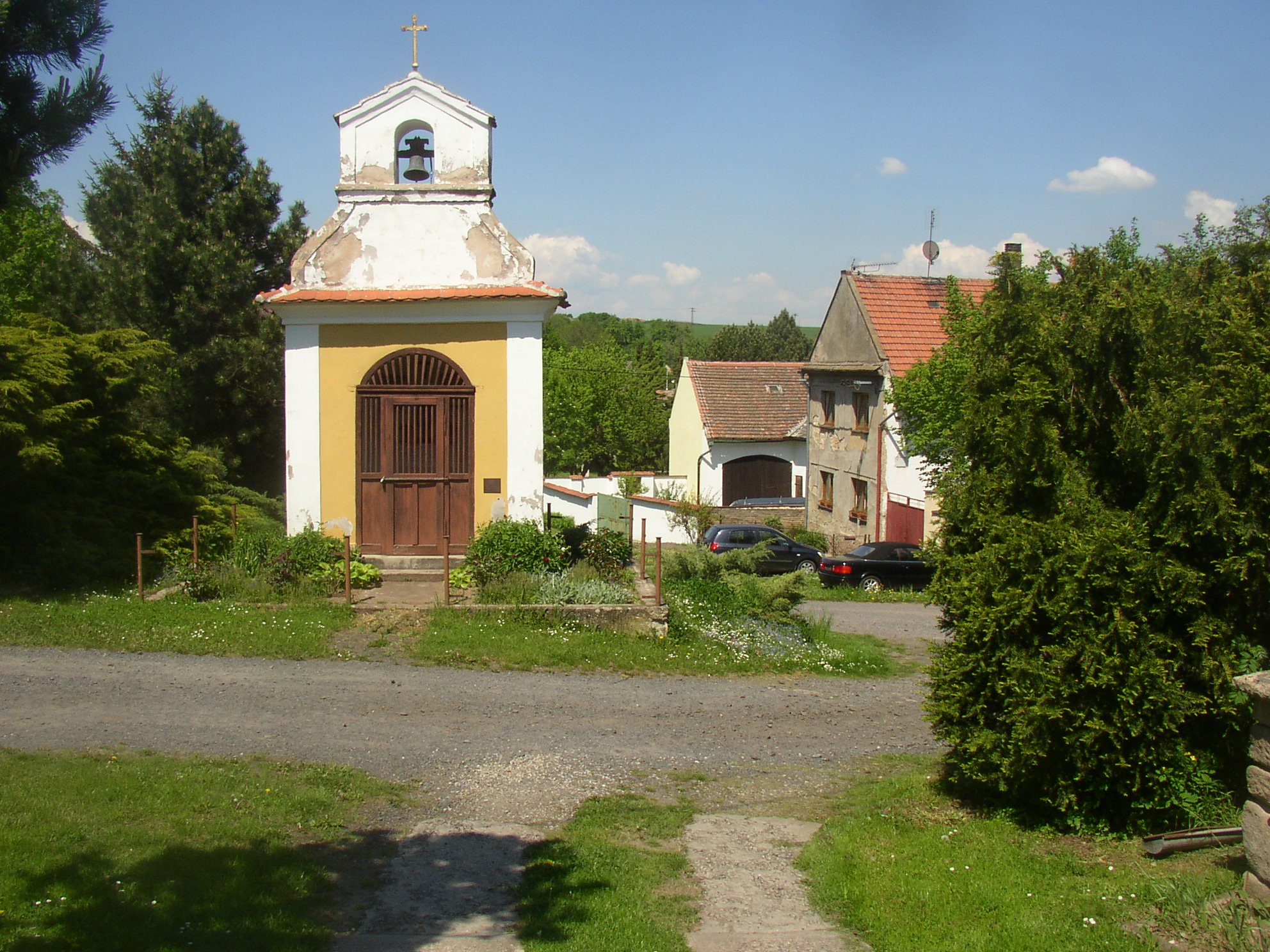
Baroque chapel

The only protected cultural monument in the municipality is a small Baroque chapel from the first half of the 19th century.
