= Černuc =

- Municipality
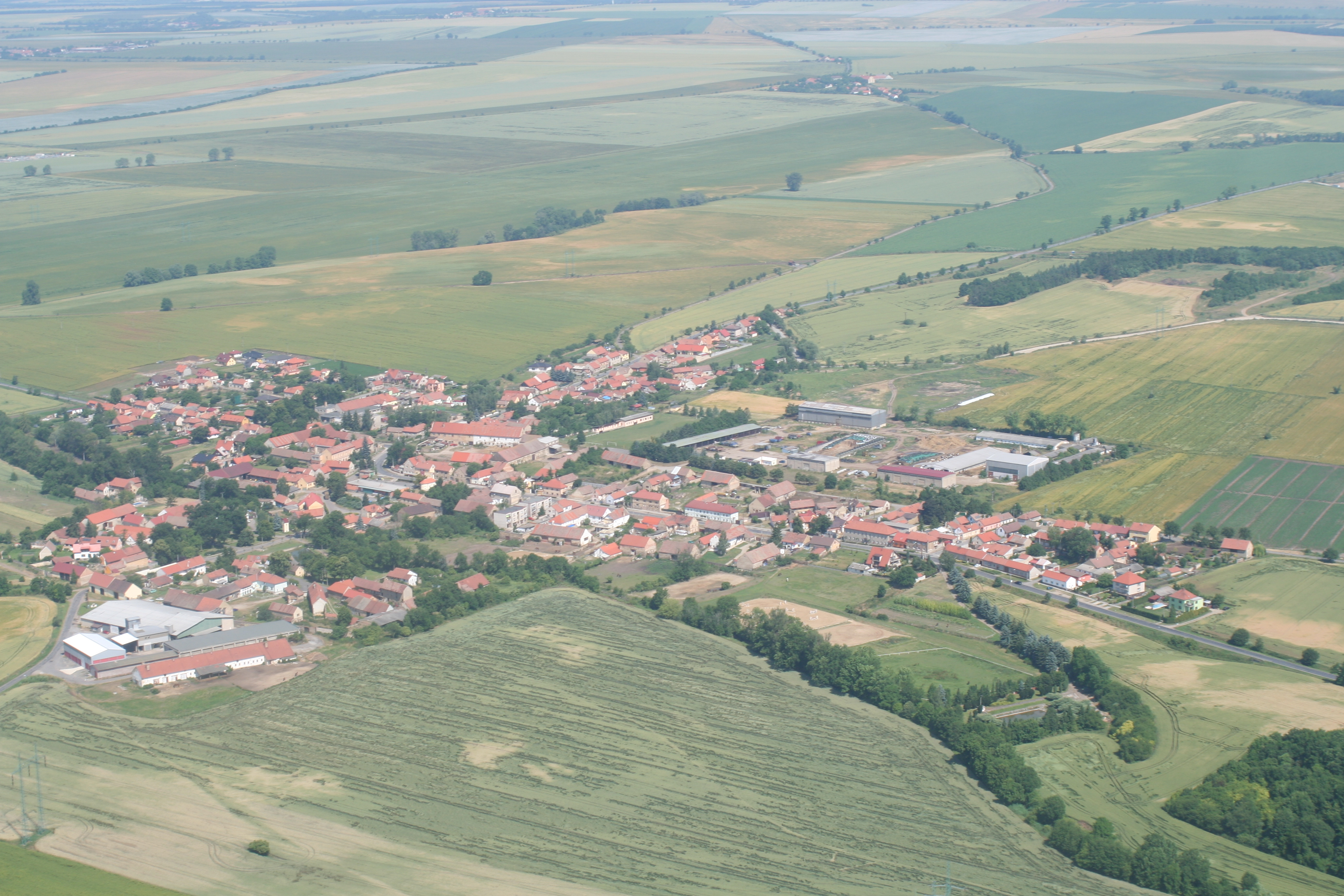
- Aerial view

- Flag Coat of arms

- Location in the Czech Republic
- Coordinates: 50°18′4″N 14°12′9″E
- Country: Czech Republic
- Region: Central Bohemian
- District: Kladno
- First mentioned: 1336

Area
  - Total: 21.20 km^{2} (8.19 sq mi)
- Elevation: 192 m (630 ft)

Population (2026-01-01)
  - Total: 1,021
  - Density: 48.16/km^{2} (124.7/sq mi)
- Time zone: UTC+1 (CET)
  - Summer (DST): UTC+2 (CEST)
- Postal codes: 273 23, 273 24
- Website: www.cernuc.cz

Černuc is a municipality and village in Kladno District in the Central Bohemian Region of the Czech Republic. It has about 1,000 inhabitants.

== Administrative division ==
Černuc consists of four municipal parts (in brackets population according to the 2021 census):

- Černuc (542)
- Bratkovice (126)
- Miletice (188)
- Nabdín (72)

== Etymology ==
The name is derived from the personal name Črnút, meaning "Črnút's (court)".

== Geography ==
Černuc is located about 19 kilometres (12 mi) north of Kladno and 26 km (16 mi) northwest of Prague. It lies in an agricultural landscape of the Lower Ohře Table. The highest point is at 249 m (817 ft) above sea level. The streams Bakovský potok and Vranský potok flow through the municipality.

== History ==
The first written mention of Černuc is from 1336, when King John of Bohemia exchanged the village for other property of the convent in Doksany. The convent owned Černuc in 1336–1421. In 1468–1603, the village was a property of the Bezdružický branch of the Kolowrat family as a part of the Buštěhrad estate. From 1603, the Doksany convent again owned Černuc, which lasted until the abolishment of the convent in 1782. After that, the village quickly changed hands. The last noble owners of Černuc were the Lexa of Aehrenthal family, which held it from 1806 until the establishment of an independent municipality in 1848.

== Demographics ==
Historical population

| Year | Pop. | ±% |
|---|---|---|
| 1869 | 1,502 | — |
| 1880 | 1,761 | +17.2% |
| 1890 | 1,817 | +3.2% |
| 1900 | 1,955 | +7.6% |
| 1910 | 1,907 | −2.5% |

| Year | Pop. | ±% |
|---|---|---|
| 1921 | 1,910 | +0.2% |
| 1930 | 1,835 | −3.9% |
| 1950 | 1,257 | −31.5% |
| 1961 | 1,226 | −2.5% |
| 1970 | 1,138 | −7.2% |

| Year | Pop. | ±% |
|---|---|---|
| 1980 | 1,034 | −9.1% |
| 1991 | 868 | −16.1% |
| 2001 | 914 | +5.3% |
| 2011 | 936 | +2.4% |
| 2021 | 928 | −0.9% |

Source: Censuses

== Transport ==
There are no major roads passing through the municipality. The railway that runs through the municipality is unused.

== Sights ==
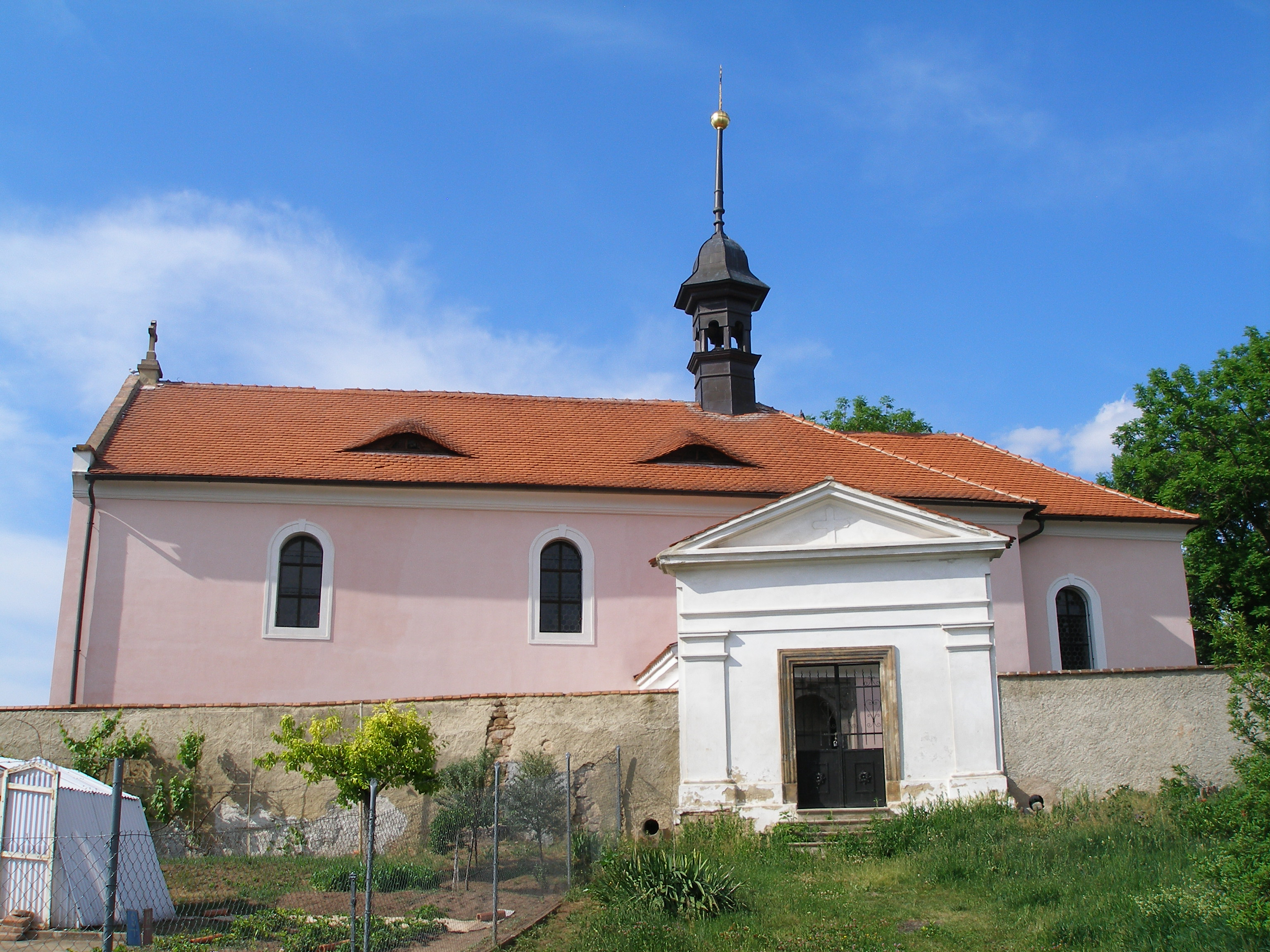
Church of Saint Barbara

The most valuable monument is the Church of Saint Barbara, located in Nabdín. It was originally a Romanesque building, extended and rebuilt in the first half of the 14th century. It was modified in the Renaissance style and then in 1695 and in the 19th century.
