= Kalivody =

- Municipality
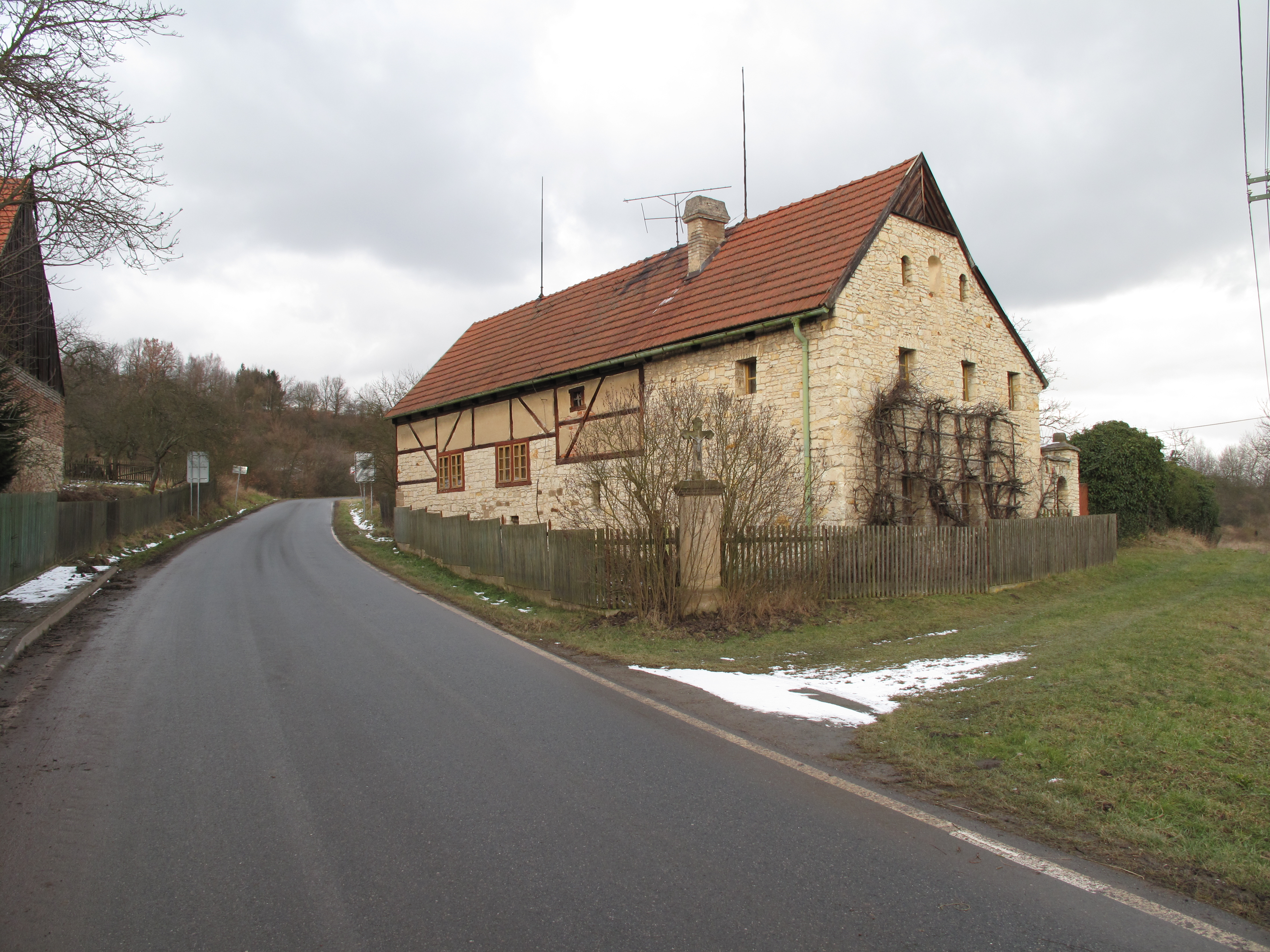
- Half-timbered house

- Location in the Czech Republic
- Coordinates: 50°12′31″N 13°50′31″E
- Country: Czech Republic
- Region: Central Bohemian
- District: Rakovník
- First mentioned: 1389

Area
  - Total: 4.35 km^{2} (1.68 sq mi)
- Elevation: 369 m (1,211 ft)

Population (2026-01-01)
  - Total: 123
  - Density: 28.3/km^{2} (73.2/sq mi)
- Time zone: UTC+1 (CET)
  - Summer (DST): UTC+2 (CEST)
- Postal code: 270 54
- Website: www.kalivody.cz

Kalivody is a municipality and village in Rakovník District in the Central Bohemian Region of the Czech Republic. It has about 100 inhabitants. The stream Bakovský potok originates in the municipality.

== Demographics ==
Historical population
| Year | Pop. | ±% |
|---|---|---|
| 1869 | 227 | — |
| 1880 | 267 | +17.6% |
| 1890 | 215 | −19.5% |
| 1900 | 239 | +11.2% |
| 1910 | 224 | −6.3% |
| 1921 | 231 | +3.1% |
| 1930 | 237 | +2.6% |
| 1950 | 184 | −22.4% |
| 1961 | 174 | −5.4% |
| 1970 | 149 | −14.4% |
| 1980 | 113 | −24.2% |
| 1991 | 95 | −15.9% |
| 2001 | 89 | −6.3% |
| 2011 | 92 | +3.4% |
| 2021 | 115 | +25.0% |
Source: Censuses
