= Dřínov (Mělník District) =

- Municipality
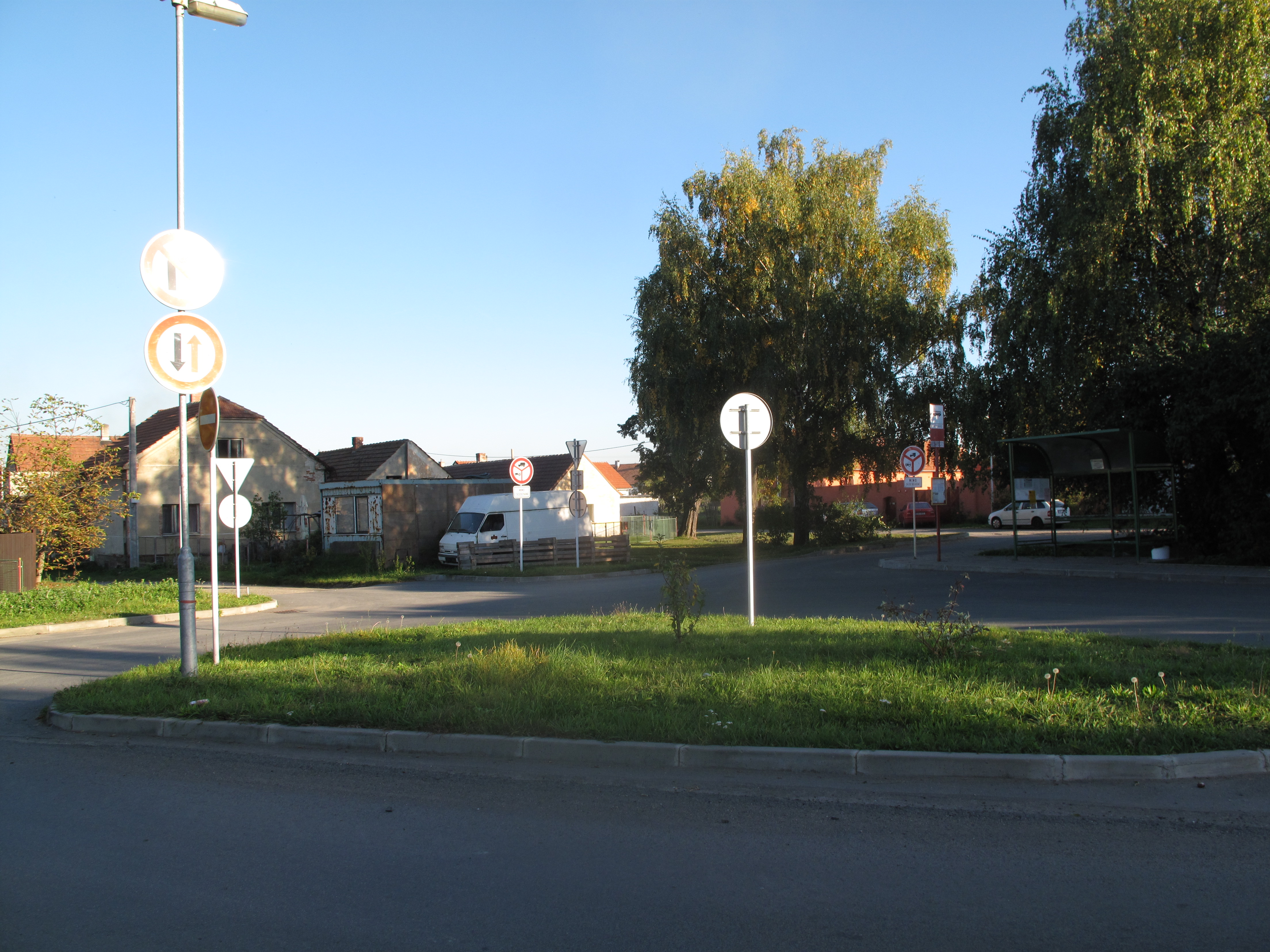
- Centre of Dřínov

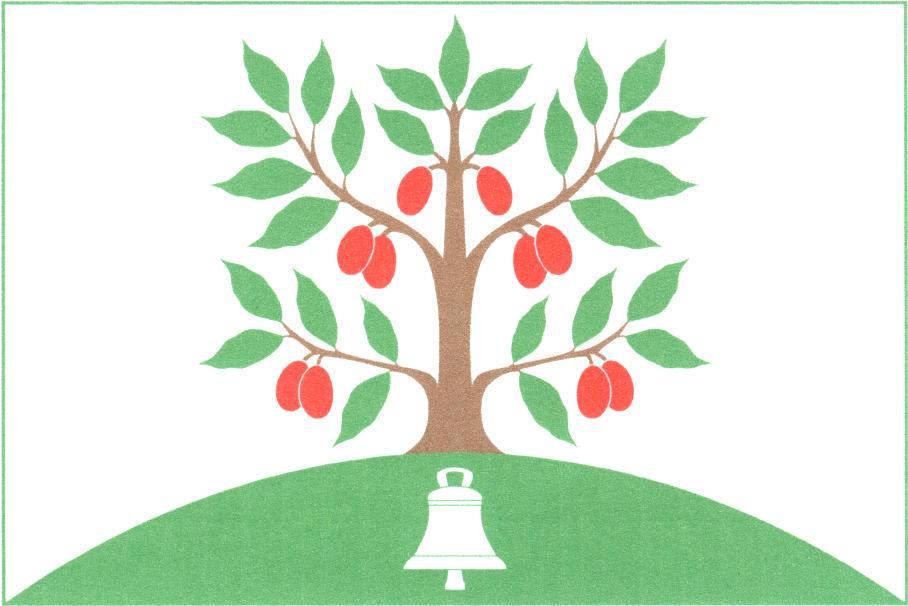
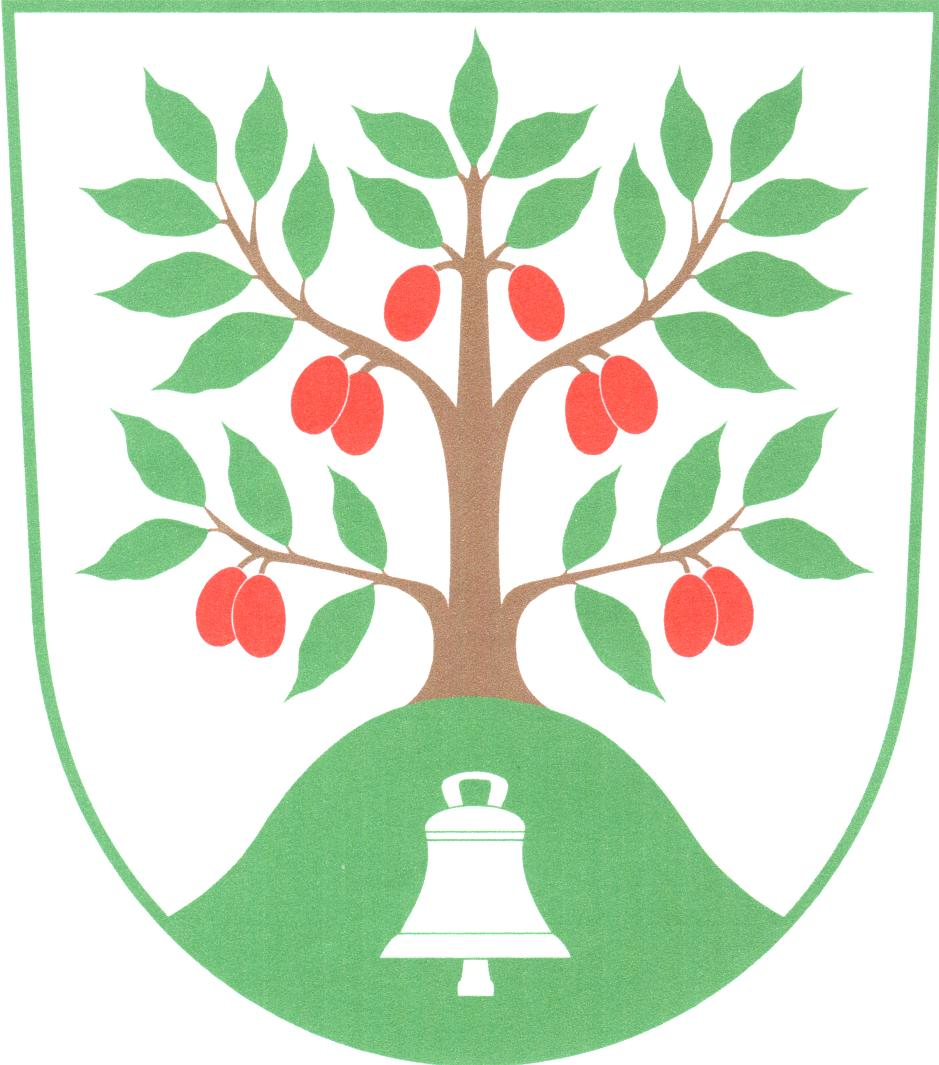
- Flag Coat of arms

- Location in the Czech Republic
- Coordinates: 50°16′25″N 14°23′51″E
- Country: Czech Republic
- Region: Central Bohemian
- District: Mělník
- First mentioned: 1353

Area
  - Total: 4.58 km^{2} (1.77 sq mi)
- Elevation: 194 m (636 ft)

Population (2026-01-01)
  - Total: 515
  - Density: 112/km^{2} (291/sq mi)
- Time zone: UTC+1 (CET)
  - Summer (DST): UTC+2 (CEST)
- Postal code: 277 45
- Website: www.drinov-melnicko.net

Dřínov is a municipality and village in Mělník District in the Central Bohemian Region of the Czech Republic. It has about 500 inhabitants.

== Demographics ==
Historical population
Year	Pop.	±%
1869	506	—
1880	586	+15.8%
1890	579	−1.2%
1900	543	−6.2%
1910	555	+2.2%
1921	566	+2.0%
1930	556	−1.8%
1950	443	−20.3%
1961	446	+0.7%
1970	469	+5.2%
1980	411	−12.4%
1991	314	−23.6%
2001	337	+7.3%
2011	427	+26.7%
2021	465	+8.9%
Source: Censuses
