= Neprobylice =

- Municipality
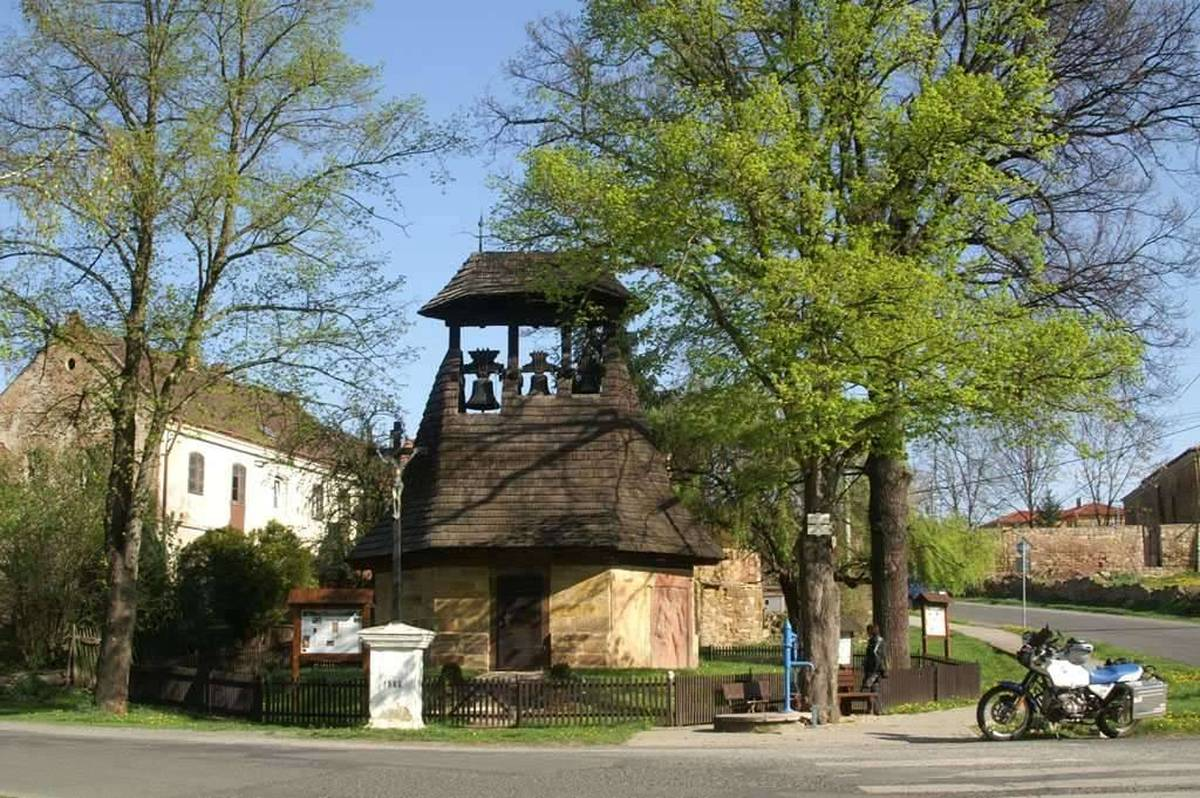
- Belfry in the centre of Neprobylice

- Flag Coat of arms

- Location in the Czech Republic
- Coordinates: 50°15′51″N 14°1′40″E
- Country: Czech Republic
- Region: Central Bohemian
- District: Kladno
- First mentioned: 1316

Area
  - Total: 3.44 km^{2} (1.33 sq mi)
- Elevation: 251 m (823 ft)

Population (2026-01-01)
  - Total: 163
  - Density: 47.4/km^{2} (123/sq mi)
- Time zone: UTC+1 (CET)
  - Summer (DST): UTC+2 (CEST)
- Postal code: 273 75
- Website: www.neprobylice.cz

Neprobylice is a municipality and village in Kladno District in the Central Bohemian Region of the Czech Republic. It has about 200 inhabitants.

== Demographics ==
Historical population
Year	Pop.	±%
1869	284	—
1880	225	−20.8%
1890	198	−12.0%
1900	210	+6.1%
1910	219	+4.3%
1921	242	+10.5%
1930	220	−9.1%
1950	164	−25.5%
1961	142	−13.4%
1970	133	−6.3%
1980	101	−24.1%
1991	99	−2.0%
2001	120	+21.2%
2011	134	+11.7%
2021	154	+14.9%
Source: Censuses
