= Kvílice =

- Municipality
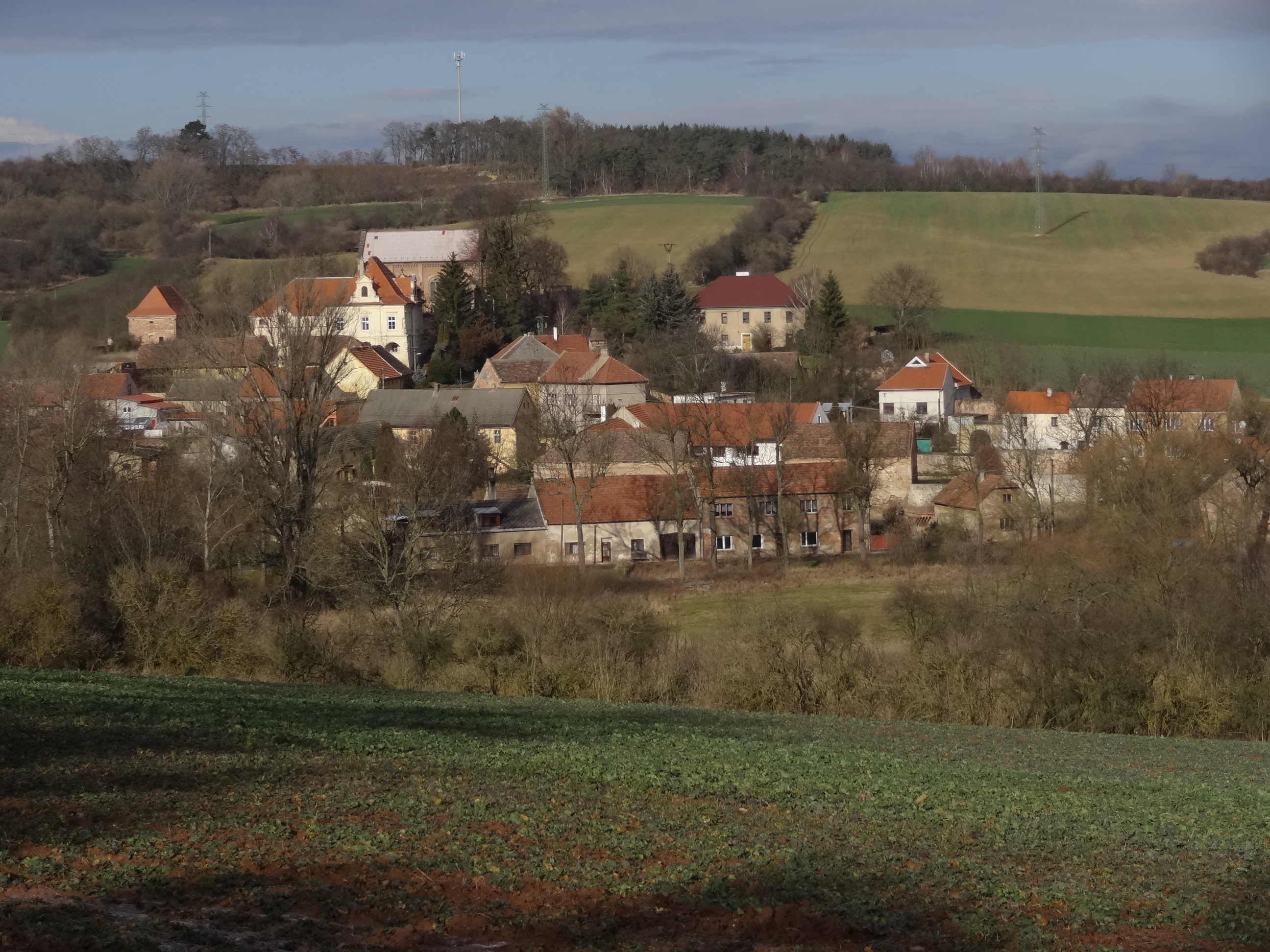
- View from the south

- Location in the Czech Republic
- Coordinates: 50°15′29″N 14°0′9″E
- Country: Czech Republic
- Region: Central Bohemian
- District: Kladno
- First mentioned: 1352

Area
  - Total: 1.95 km^{2} (0.75 sq mi)
- Elevation: 278 m (912 ft)

Population (2026-01-01)
  - Total: 88
  - Density: 45/km^{2} (120/sq mi)
- Time zone: UTC+1 (CET)
  - Summer (DST): UTC+2 (CEST)
- Postal code: 273 75
- Website: www.kvilice.cz

Kvílice is a municipality and village in Kladno District in the Central Bohemian Region of the Czech Republic. It has about 90 inhabitants.

== Demographics ==
Historical population
Year	Pop.	±%
1869	209	—
1880	198	−5.3%
1890	230	+16.2%
1900	198	−13.9%
1910	201	+1.5%
1921	177	−11.9%
1930	180	+1.7%
1950	117	−35.0%
1961	168	+43.6%
1970	159	−5.4%
1980	113	−28.9%
1991	83	−26.5%
2001	80	−3.6%
2011	80	+0.0%
2021	88	+10.0%
Source: Censuses
