= Bdín =

- Municipality
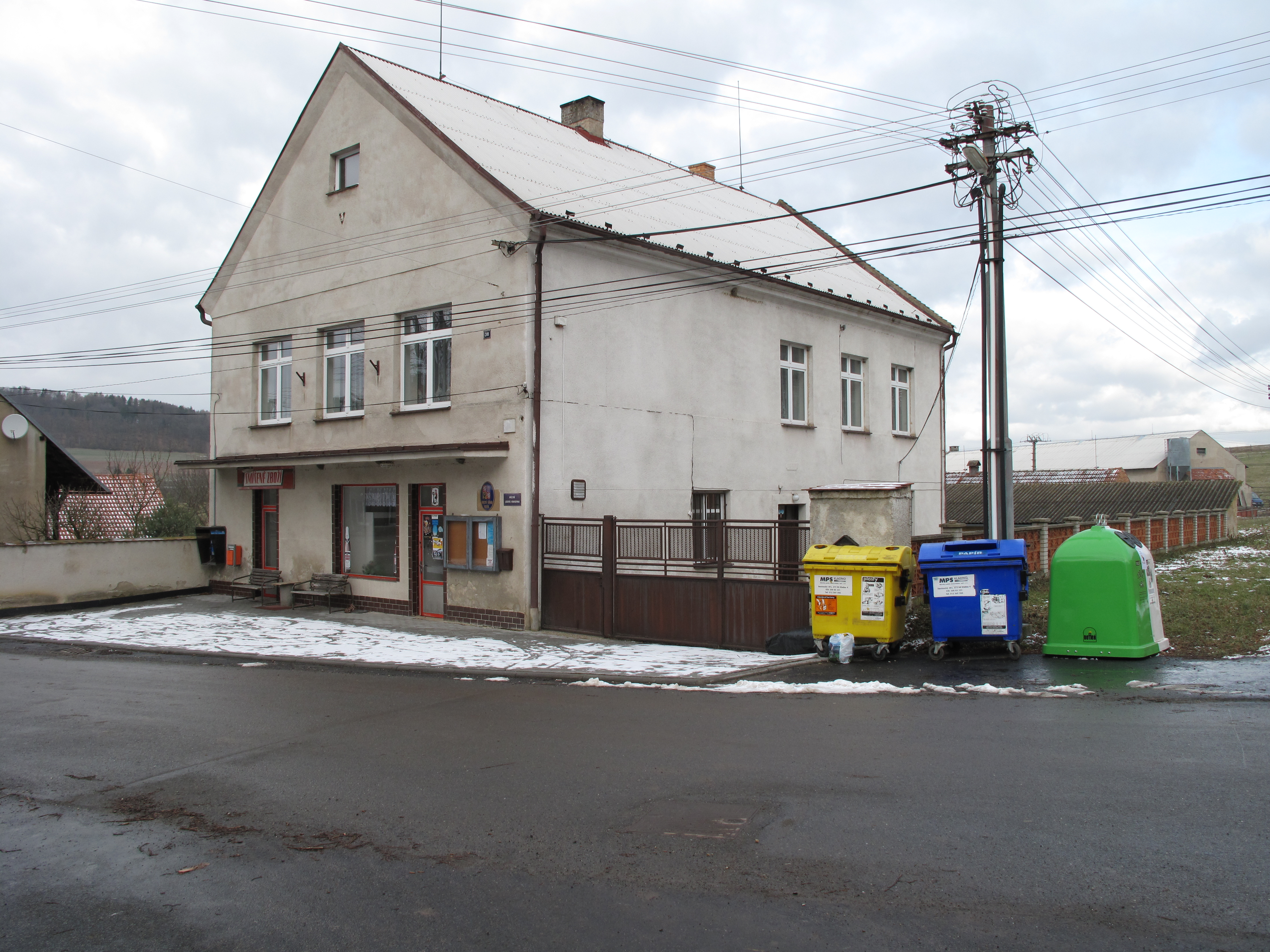
- Municipal office

- Location in the Czech Republic
- Coordinates: 50°12′51″N 13°51′32″E
- Country: Czech Republic
- Region: Central Bohemian
- District: Rakovník
- First mentioned: 1318

Area
  - Total: 2.12 km^{2} (0.82 sq mi)
- Elevation: 360 m (1,180 ft)

Population (2026-01-01)
  - Total: 69
  - Density: 33/km^{2} (84/sq mi)
- Time zone: UTC+1 (CET)
  - Summer (DST): UTC+2 (CEST)
- Postal code: 270 54
- Website: www.obec-bdin.cz

Bdín is a municipality and village in Rakovník District in the Central Bohemian Region of the Czech Republic. It has about 70 inhabitants.

== Etymology ==
The name is derived from the personal name Bda, meaning "Bda's court".

== Geography ==
Bdín is located about 15 kilometres (9 mi) northeast of Rakovník and 39 km (24 mi) northwest of Prague. It lies in the Džbán range. The highest point is at 476 m (1,562 ft) above sea level. The upper course of the stream Bakovský potok flows through the municipality.

== History ==
The first written mention of Bdín is from 1318.

== Demographics ==
Historical population

Year	Pop.	±%
1869	280	—
1880	263	−6.1%
1890	251	−4.6%
1900	261	+4.0%
1910	233	−10.7%

Year	Pop.	±%
1921	213	−8.6%
1930	208	−2.3%
1950	145	−30.3%
1961	125	−13.8%
1970	119	−4.8%

Year	Pop.	±%
1980	104	−12.6%
1991	77	−26.0%
2001	63	−18.2%
2011	54	−14.3%
2021	75	+38.9%

Source: Censuses

== Transport ==
The I/16 road, which connects the D6 motorway with Slaný and Mělník, runs along the southern municipal border.

== Sights ==
There are no protected cultural monuments in the municipality. Among the landmarks are a wooden belfry and a bust of John Amos Comenius from 1913.
