= Nová Ves (Mělník District) =

- Municipality
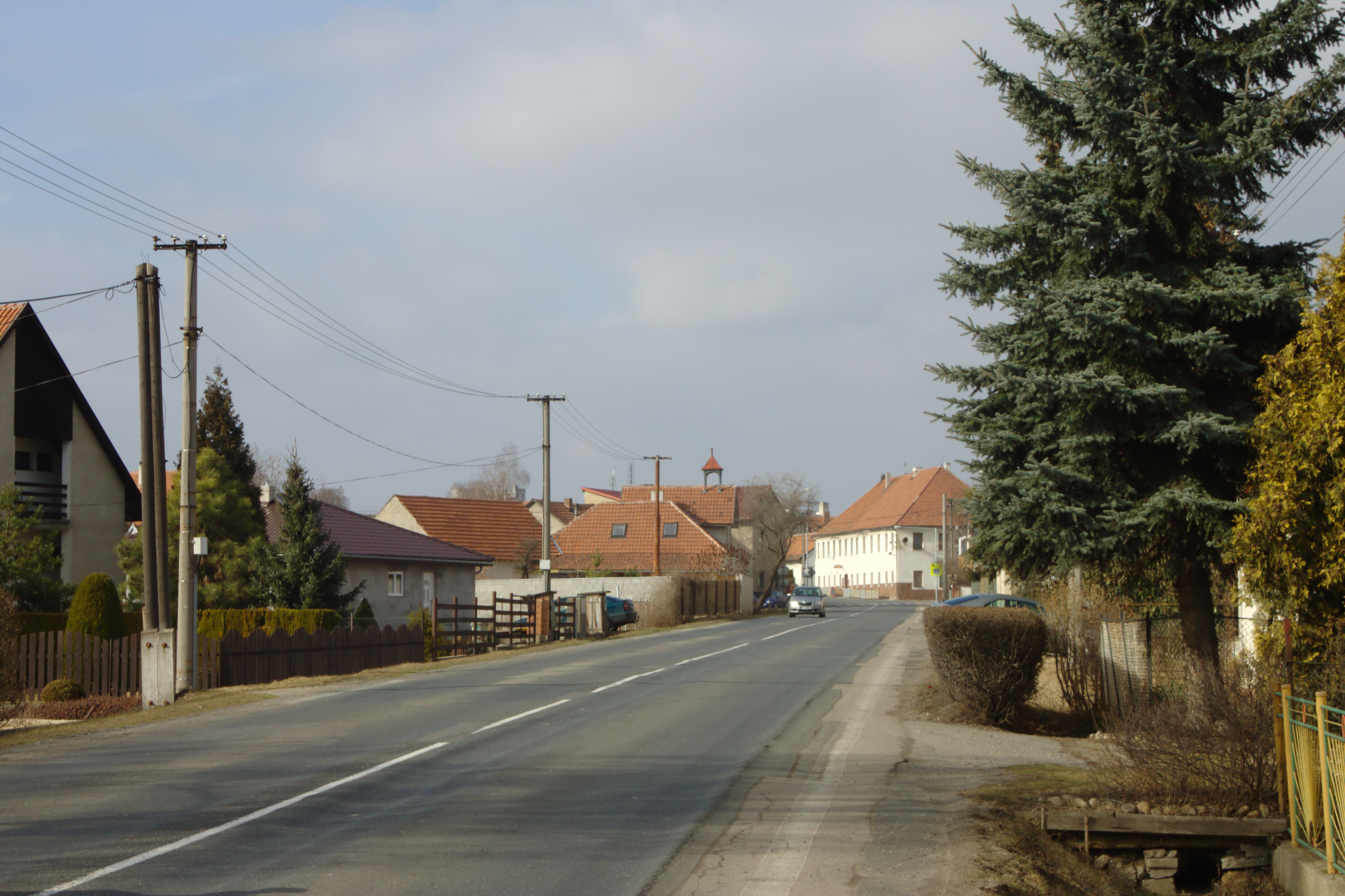
- Main road

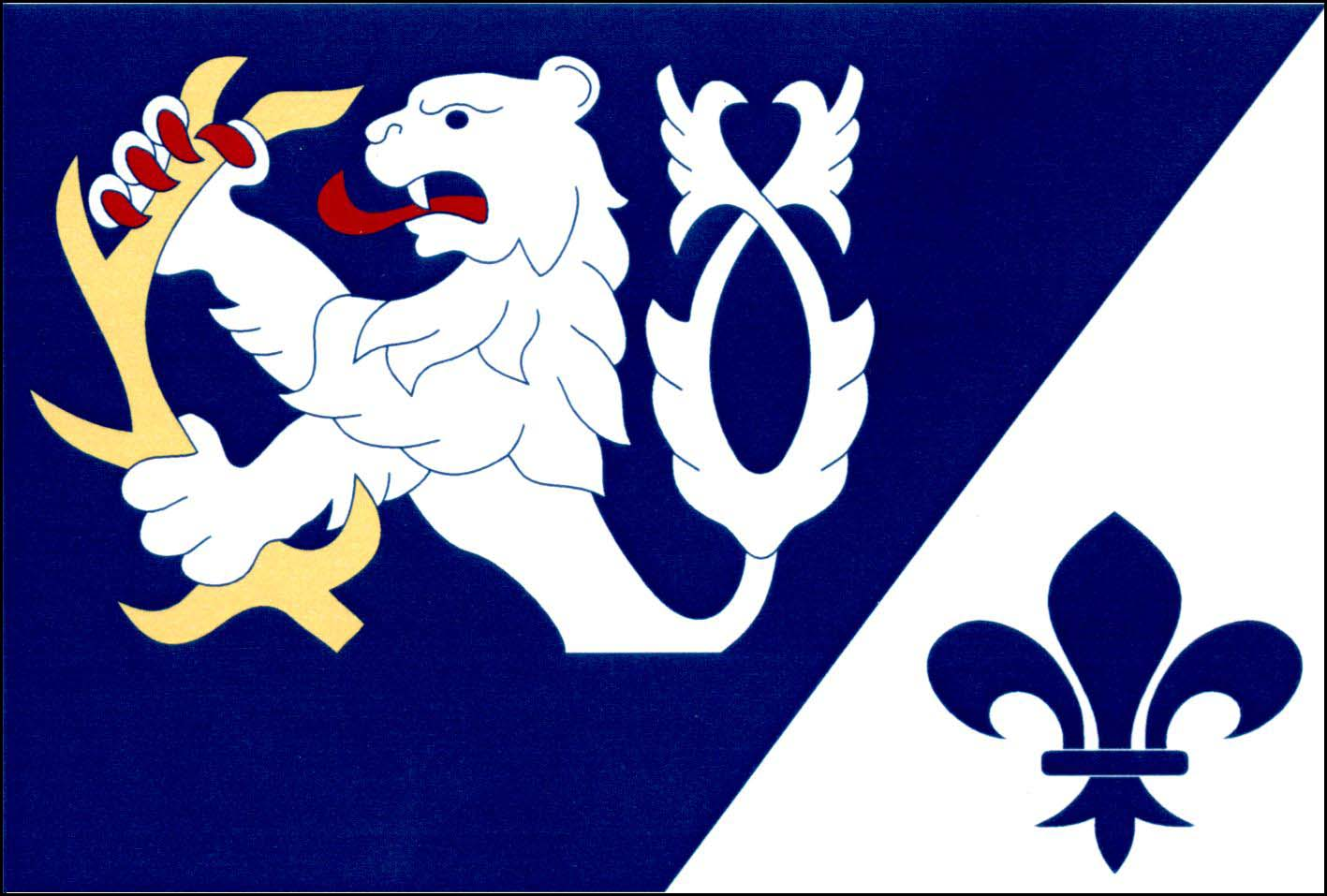
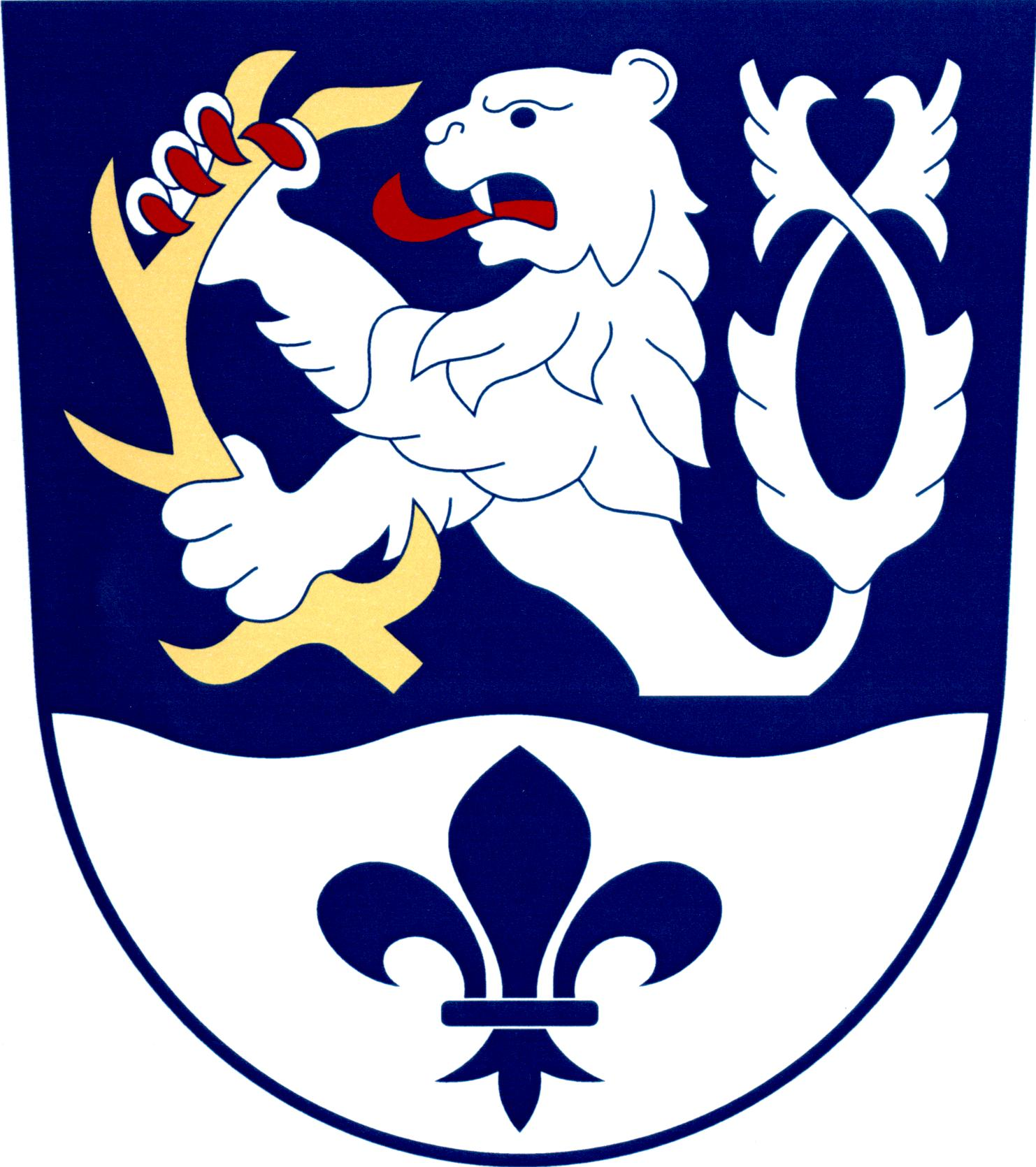
- Flag Coat of arms

- Location in the Czech Republic
- Coordinates: 50°18′46″N 14°18′30″E
- Country: Czech Republic
- Region: Central Bohemian
- District: Mělník
- First mentioned: 1421

Area
  - Total: 10.12 km^{2} (3.91 sq mi)
- Elevation: 185 m (607 ft)

Population (2026-01-01)
  - Total: 1,032
  - Density: 102.0/km^{2} (264.1/sq mi)
- Time zone: UTC+1 (CET)
  - Summer (DST): UTC+2 (CEST)
- Postal code: 277 52
- Website: www.nova-ves.cz

Nová Ves is a municipality and village in Mělník District in the Central Bohemian Region of the Czech Republic. It has about 1,000 inhabitants.

== Administrative division ==
Nová Ves consists of five municipal parts (in brackets population according to the 2021 census):

- Nová Ves (416)
- Miřejovice (78)
- Nové Ouholice (149)
- Staré Ouholice (264)
- Vepřek (157)

== Etymology ==
The name Nová Ves means 'new village' in Czech.

== Geography ==
Nová Ves is located about 13 kilometres (8 mi) west of Mělník and 22 km (14 mi) north of Prague. It lies on the border between the Lower Ohře Table and Central Elbe Table. The highest point is at 270 m (890 ft) above sea level. The municipality is situated on the left bank of the Vltava River. The stream Bakovský potok flows through the municipality and then joins the Vltava.

== History ==
The first written mention of Nová Ves is from 1421.

== Demographics ==
Historical population

Year	Pop.	±%
1869	1,041	—
1880	960	−7.8%
1890	988	+2.9%
1900	1,055	+6.8%
1910	1,114	+5.6%

Year	Pop.	±%
1921	1,157	+3.9%
1930	1,322	+14.3%
1950	1,140	−13.8%
1961	1,182	+3.7%
1970	1,082	−8.5%

Year	Pop.	±%
1980	936	−13.5%
1991	800	−14.5%
2001	817	+2.1%
2011	1,149	+40.6%
2021	1,064	−7.4%

Source: Censuses

== Economy ==
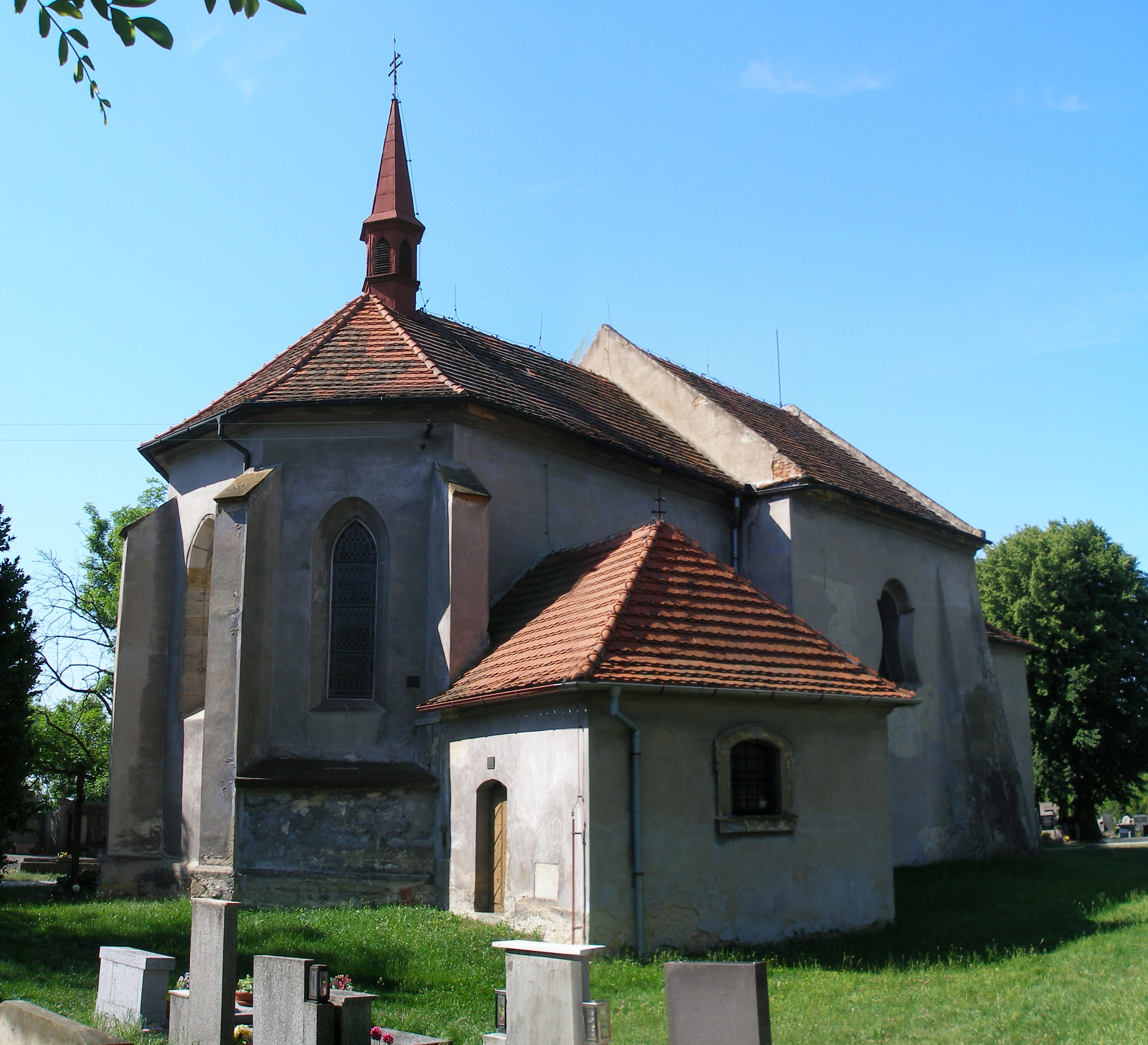
Church of the Nativity of the Virgin Mary

Vepřek Solar Park, the largest photovoltaic power station by area and the second biggest by nameplate capacity, is located in Vepřek.

== Transport ==
The D8 motorway from Prague to Ústí nad Labem runs through the municipality.

== Sights ==
There are four cultural monuments in the municipality: Church of the Nativity of the Virgin Mary, a belfry in Nová Ves, a belfry in Vepřek and a watermill in Vepřek. The main landmark is the Church of the Nativity of the Virgin Mary. It is originally a Gothic church, first documented in 1352. In the 18th century, it was rebuilt and extended in the Baroque style.

== Gallery ==
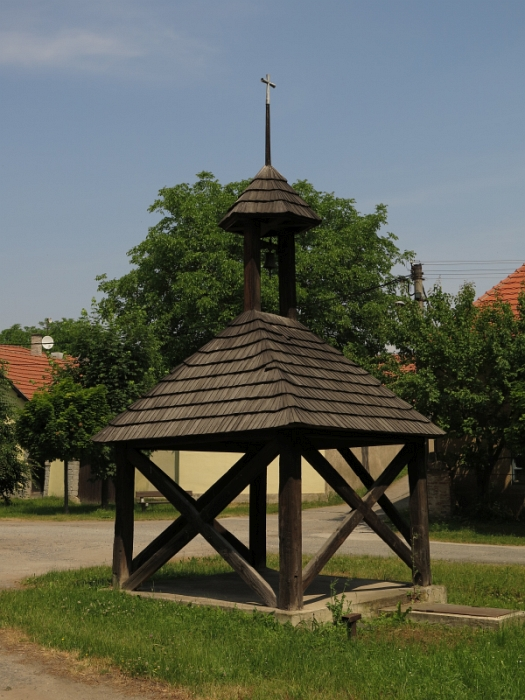
Belfry in Nová Ves

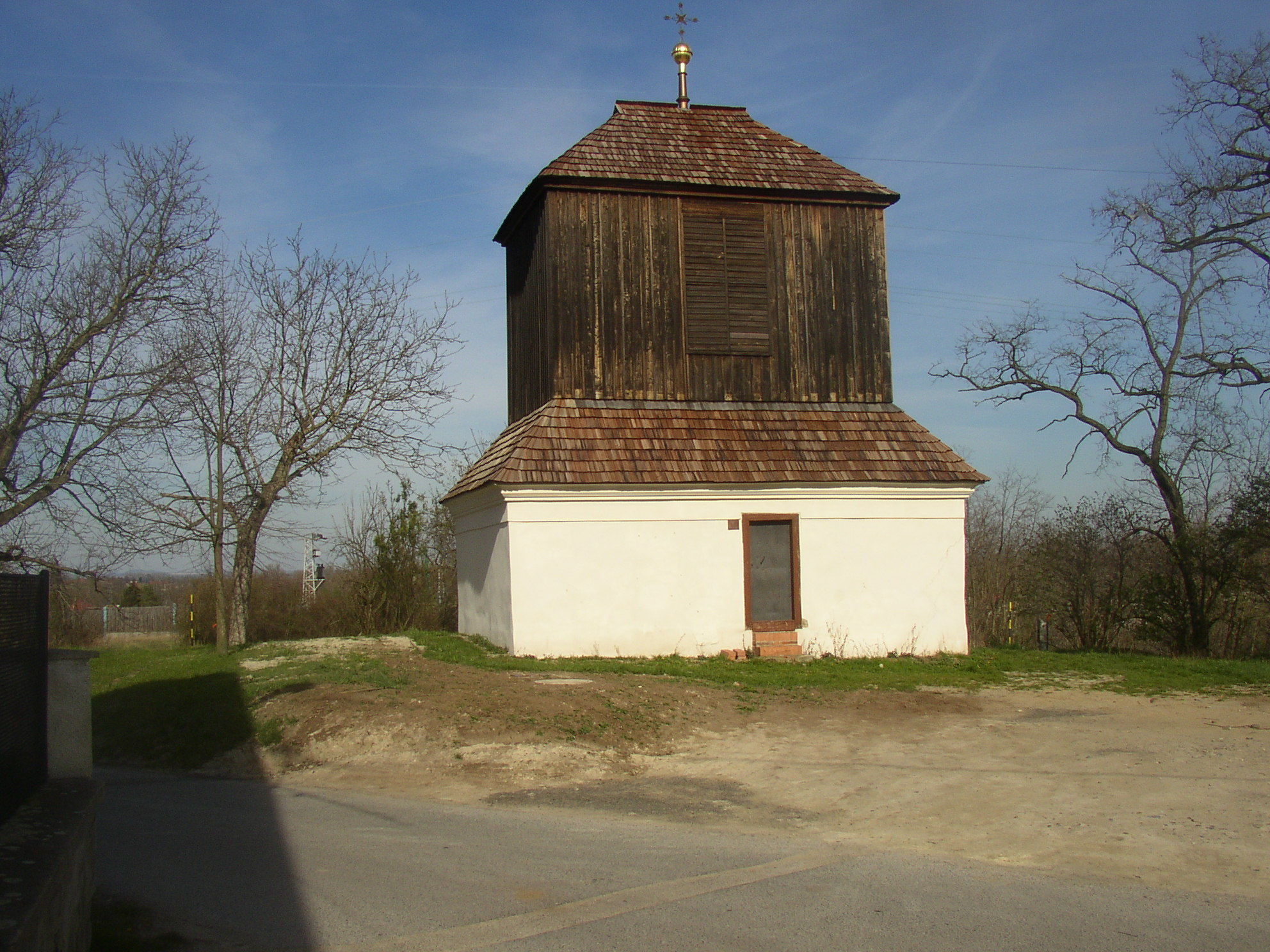
Belfry in Vepřek

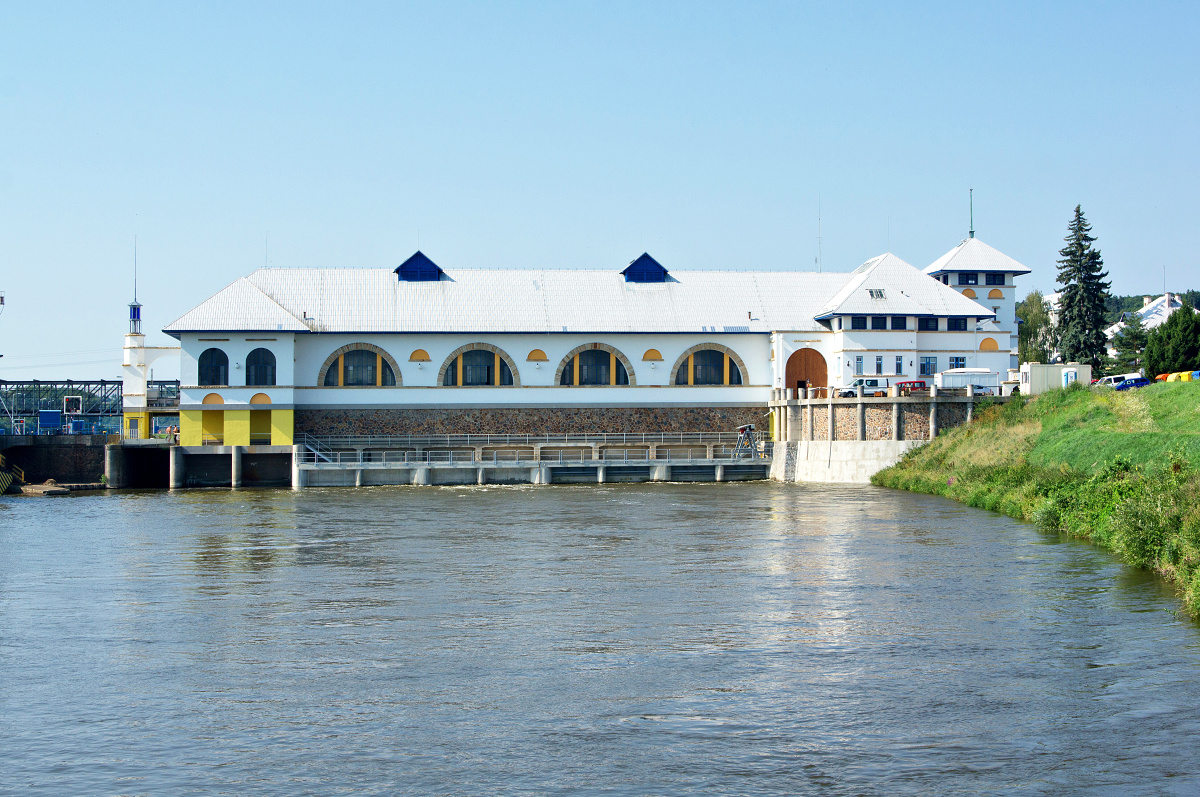
Miřejovice power plant
