= Vepřek Solar Park =

Photovoltaic power plant in the Czech Republic

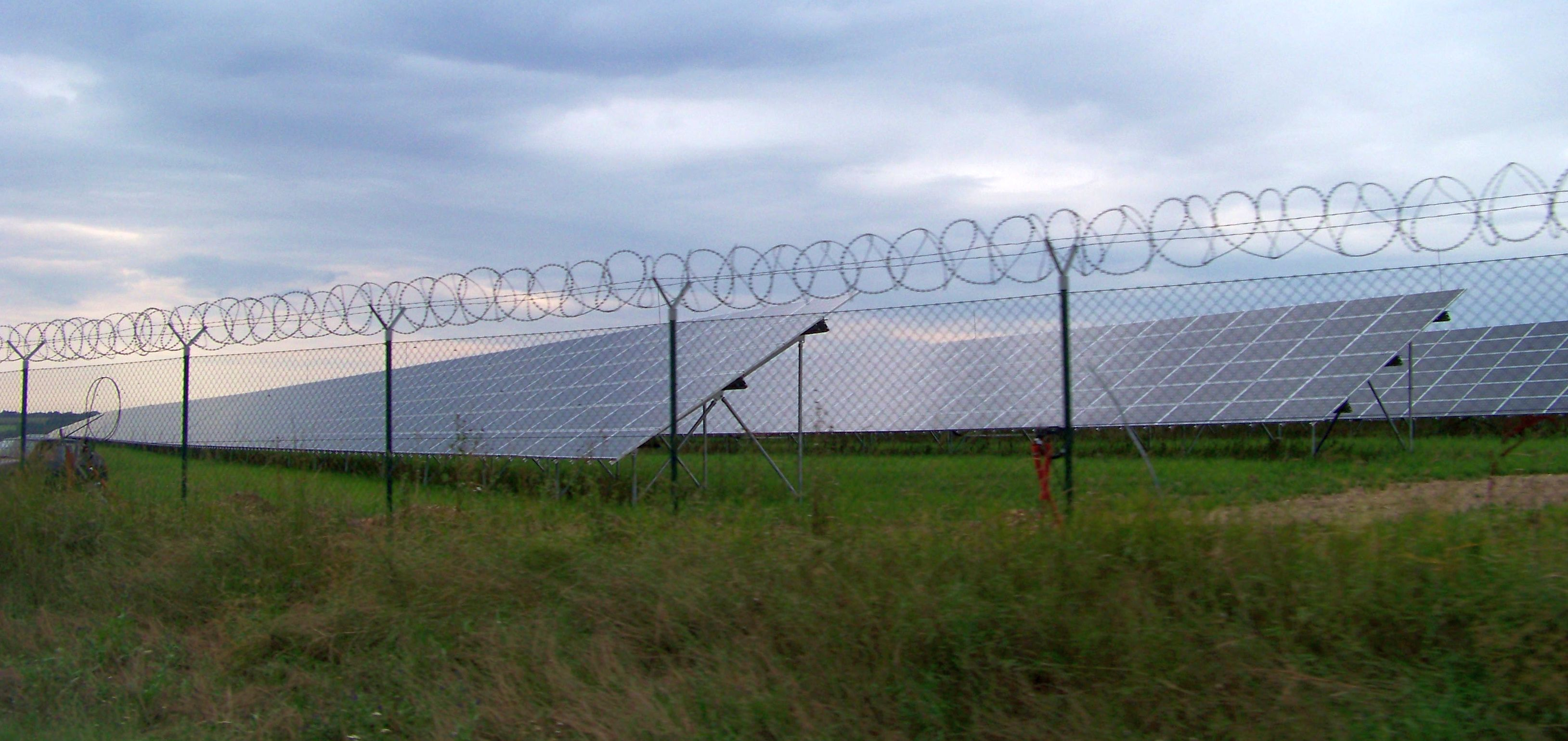
- Fotovoltaická elektrárna Vepřek, pohled ze silnice I/16
- Country: Czech Republic
- Coordinates: 50°19′N 14°19′E
- Owner: FVE Czech Novum
- Operator: FVE Czech Novum

Solar farm
- Type: Standard PV

Power generation
- Nameplate capacity: 35.1 MW

The Vepřek Solar Park (Czech: Fotovoltaická elektrárna Vepřek) is a photovoltaic power plant in the Czech Republic. It is situated near Vepřek village, part of Nová Ves municipality, approx 30 km north from Prague.

Development of the power plant began in October 2009 and the opening of the power plant took place on 8 September 2010.

The power plant's output is 35 MW and should cover the consumption of about ten thousand households. The plant's construction used up 186,960 units of PhonoSolar 185 and 190 Wp photovoltaic panels. The entire complex of 26 blocks stretches over an area of 82.5 ha, which is equivalent to more than a hundred football fields.

The investor for this plant is Decci a.s. The entire development required an investment of more than CZK 2.7 billion (approx. US$140 million).
