= Uhy =

- Municipality
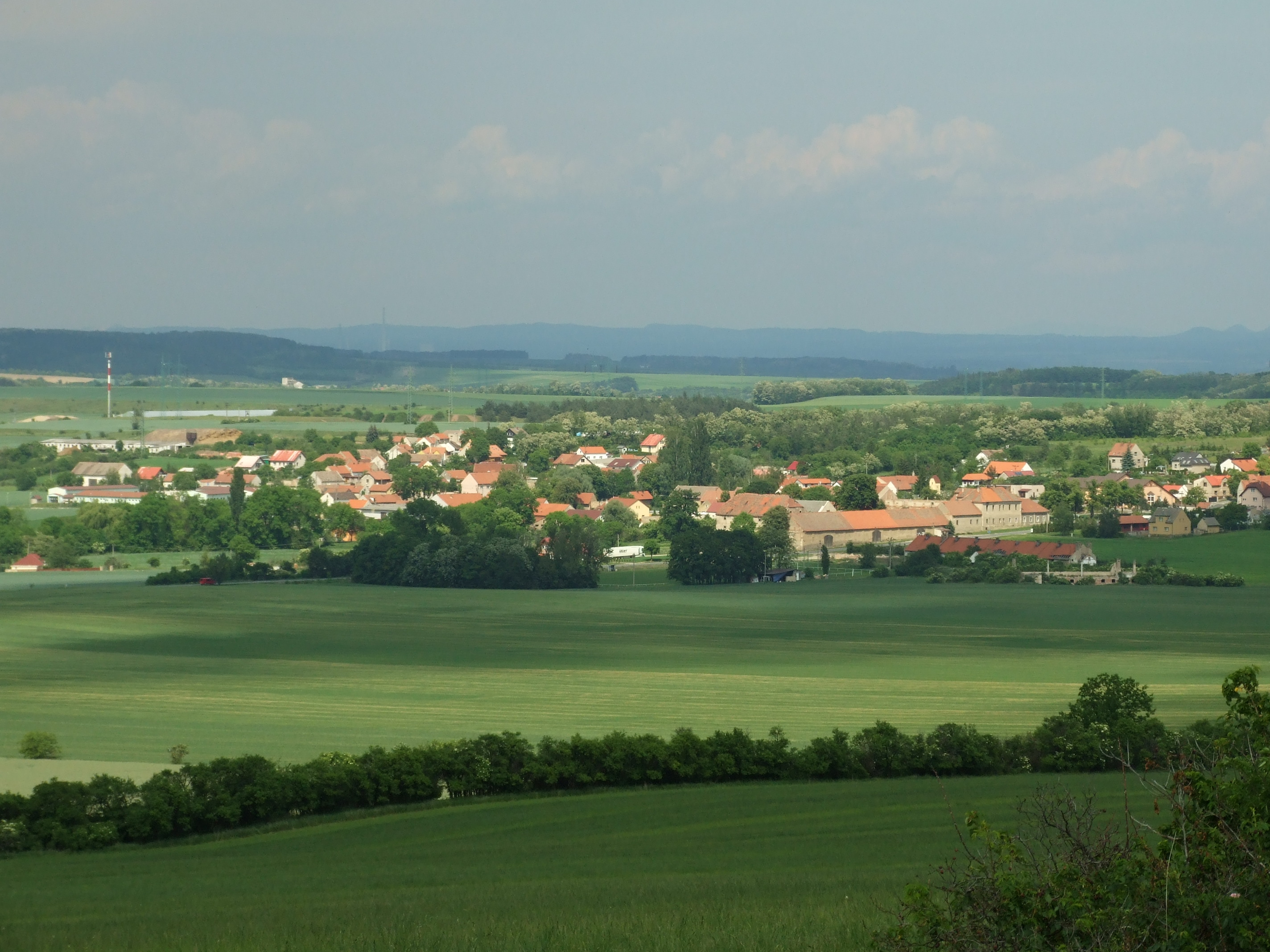
- View from the southwest

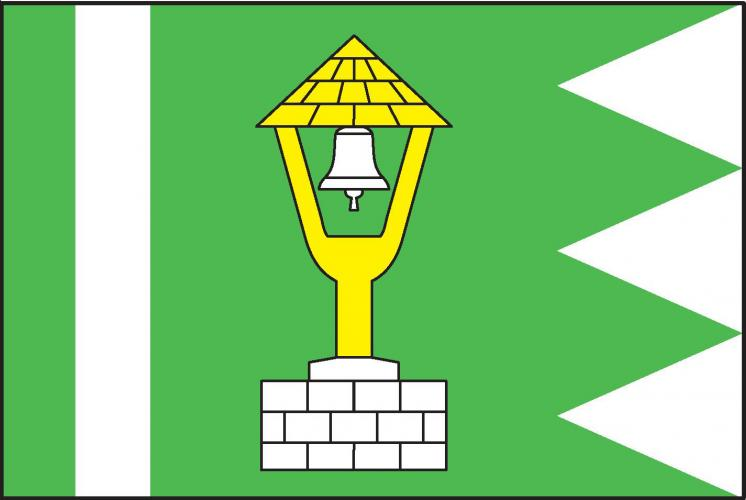
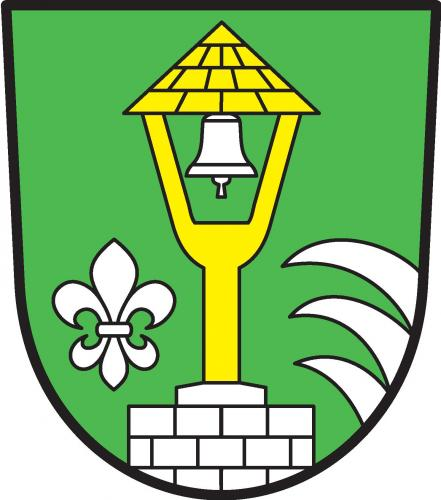
- Flag Coat of arms

- Location in the Czech Republic
- Coordinates: 50°17′4″N 14°16′26″E
- Country: Czech Republic
- Region: Central Bohemian
- District: Kladno
- First mentioned: 1318

Area
  - Total: 5.81 km^{2} (2.24 sq mi)
- Elevation: 199 m (653 ft)

Population (2026-01-01)
  - Total: 412
  - Density: 70.9/km^{2} (184/sq mi)
- Time zone: UTC+1 (CET)
  - Summer (DST): UTC+2 (CEST)
- Postal code: 273 24
- Website: www.obec-uhy.cz

Uhy is a municipality and village in Kladno District in the Central Bohemian Region of the Czech Republic. It has about 400 inhabitants.

== Demographics ==
Historical population
Year	Pop.	±%
1869	422	—
1880	366	−13.3%
1890	367	+0.3%
1900	396	+7.9%
1910	417	+5.3%
1921	414	−0.7%
1930	515	+24.4%
1950	539	+4.7%
1961	360	−33.2%
1970	358	−0.6%
1980	318	−11.2%
1991	365	+14.8%
2001	365	+0.0%
2011	365	+0.0%
2021	380	+4.1%
Source: Censuses
