= Dřínov (Kroměříž District) =

- Municipality
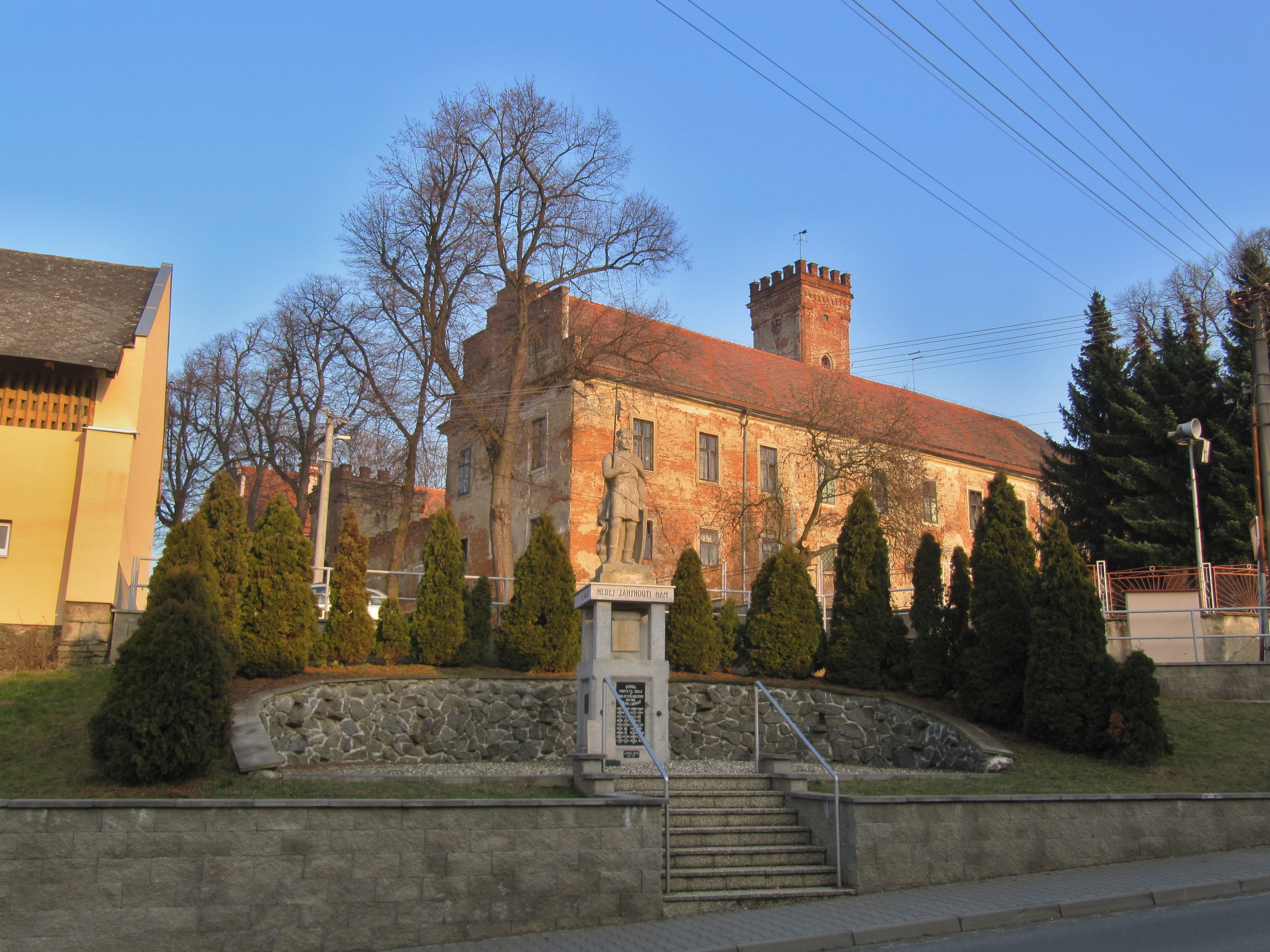
- Monument to the World Wars victims and the Dřínov Castle

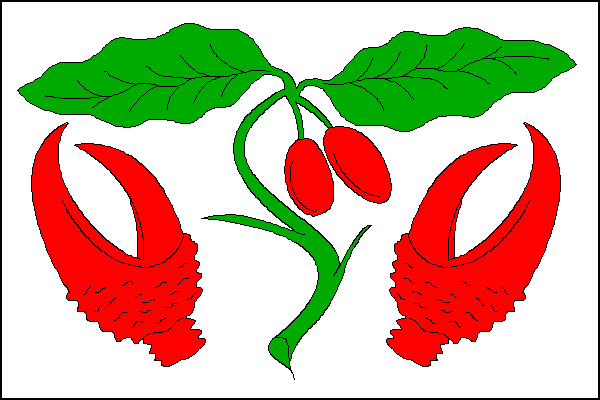
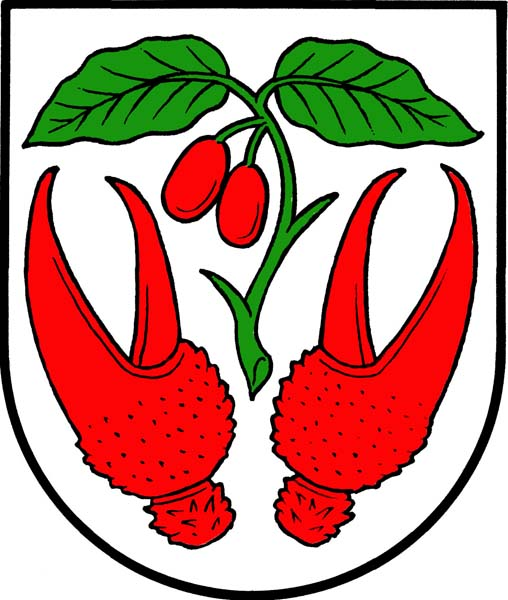
- Flag Coat of arms

- Location in the Czech Republic
- Coordinates: 49°17′34″N 17°14′0″E
- Country: Czech Republic
- Region: Zlín
- District: Kroměříž
- First mentioned: 1348

Area
  - Total: 5.44 km^{2} (2.10 sq mi)
- Elevation: 296 m (971 ft)

Population (2026-01-01)
  - Total: 435
  - Density: 80.0/km^{2} (207/sq mi)
- Time zone: UTC+1 (CET)
  - Summer (DST): UTC+2 (CEST)
- Postal code: 768 33
- Website: www.drinov.cz

Dřínov is a municipality and village in Kroměříž District in the Zlín Region of the Czech Republic. It has about 400 inhabitants.

Dřínov lies approximately 12 kilometres (7 mi) west of Kroměříž, 33 km (21 mi) west of Zlín, and 222 km (138 mi) south-east of Prague.

== Demographics ==
Historical population
| Year | Pop. | ±% |
|---|---|---|
| 1869 | 460 | — |
| 1880 | 511 | +11.1% |
| 1890 | 509 | −0.4% |
| 1900 | 523 | +2.8% |
| 1910 | 492 | −5.9% |
| 1921 | 520 | +5.7% |
| 1930 | 559 | +7.5% |
| 1950 | 495 | −11.4% |
| 1961 | 574 | +16.0% |
| 1970 | 555 | −3.3% |
| 1980 | 496 | −10.6% |
| 1991 | 465 | −6.2% |
| 2001 | 438 | −5.8% |
| 2011 | 438 | +0.0% |
| 2021 | 416 | −5.0% |
Source: Censuses
