= Beřovice =

- Municipality
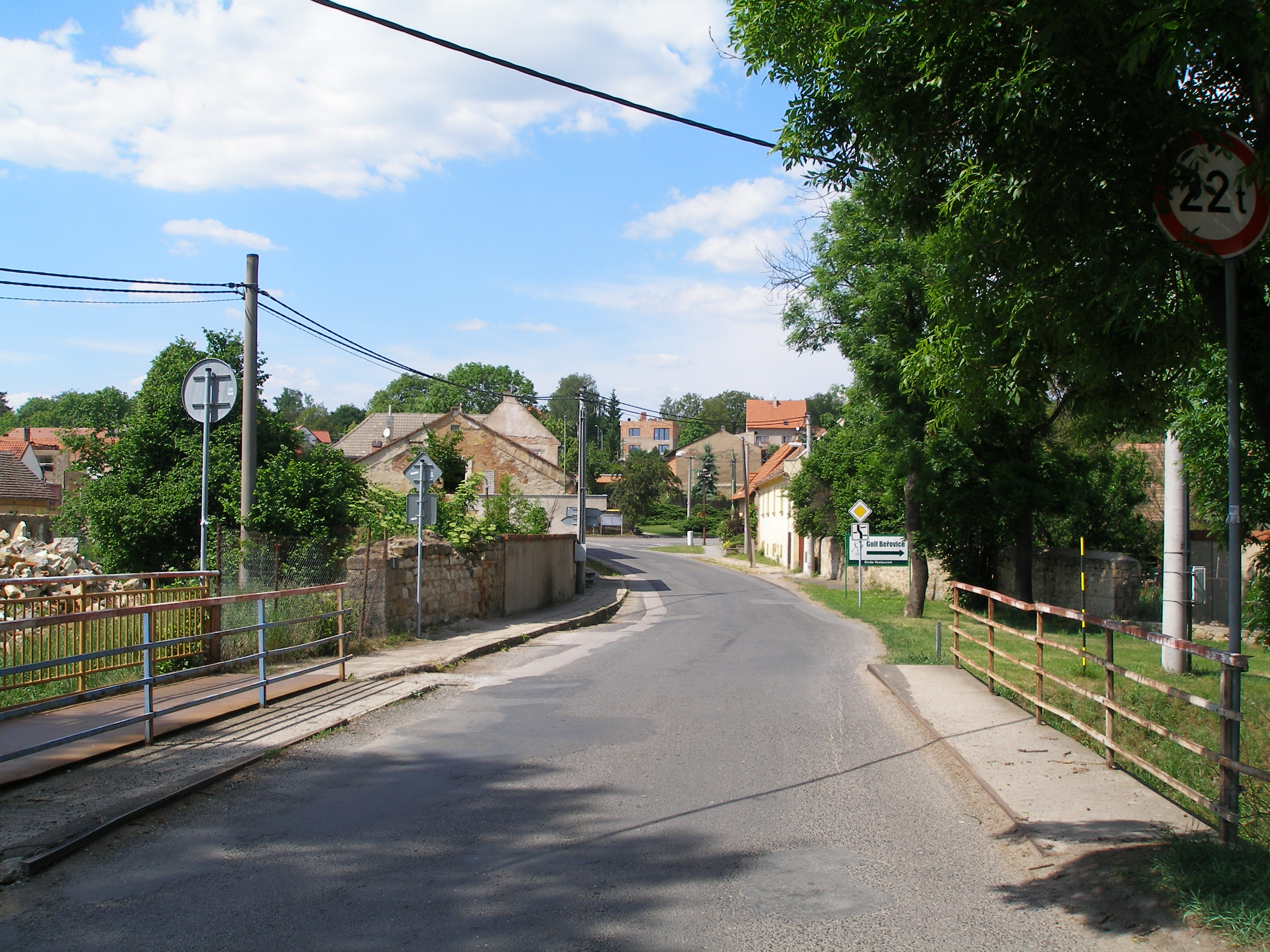
- Main street

- Flag Coat of arms

- Location in the Czech Republic
- Coordinates: 50°16′9″N 14°7′25″E
- Country: Czech Republic
- Region: Central Bohemian
- District: Kladno
- First mentioned: 1348

Area
  - Total: 5.70 km^{2} (2.20 sq mi)
- Elevation: 210 m (690 ft)

Population (2026-01-01)
  - Total: 417
  - Density: 73.2/km^{2} (189/sq mi)
- Time zone: UTC+1 (CET)
  - Summer (DST): UTC+2 (CEST)
- Postal code: 273 71
- Website: www.obecberovice.cz

Beřovice is a municipality and village in Kladno District in the Central Bohemian Region of the Czech Republic. It has about 400 inhabitants.

== Administrative division ==
Beřovice consists of two municipal parts (in brackets population according to the 2021 census):

- Beřovice (298)
- Bakov (90)

== Demographics ==
Historical population
Year	Pop.	±%
1869	578	—
1880	627	+8.5%
1890	621	−1.0%
1900	713	+14.8%
1910	706	−1.0%
1921	692	−2.0%
1930	653	−5.6%
1950	463	−29.1%
1961	453	−2.2%
1970	418	−7.7%
1980	326	−22.0%
1991	302	−7.4%
2001	279	−7.6%
2011	363	+30.1%
2021	388	+6.9%
Source: Censuses
