= Královice (Kladno District) =

- Municipality
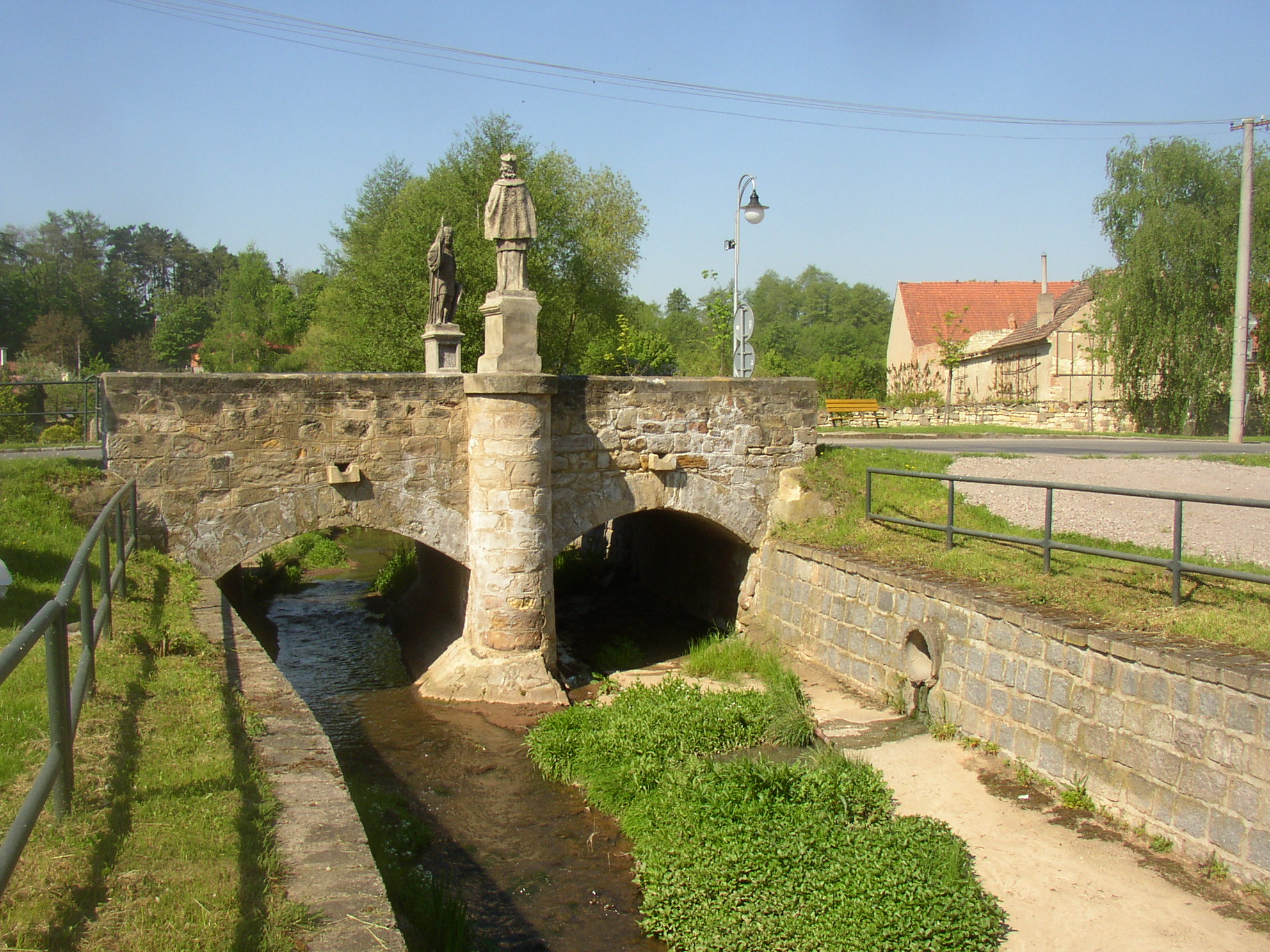
- Stone arch bridge over the Bakovský potok

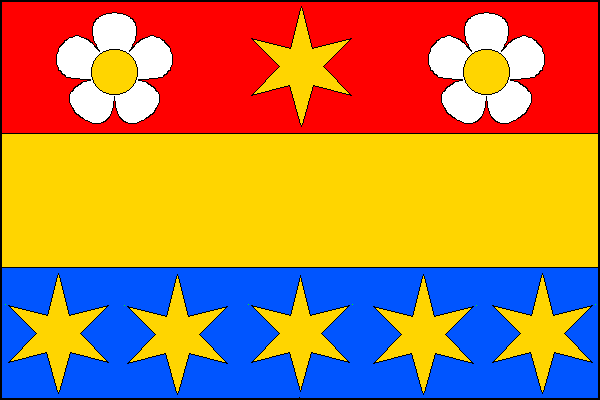
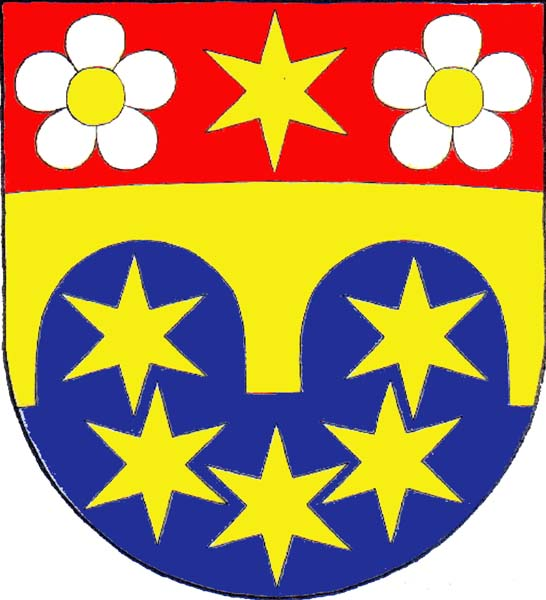
- Flag Coat of arms

- Location in the Czech Republic
- Coordinates: 50°15′47″N 14°3′21″E
- Country: Czech Republic
- Region: Central Bohemian
- District: Kladno
- First mentioned: 1316

Area
  - Total: 3.63 km^{2} (1.40 sq mi)
- Elevation: 241 m (791 ft)

Population (2026-01-01)
  - Total: 270
  - Density: 74/km^{2} (190/sq mi)
- Time zone: UTC+1 (CET)
  - Summer (DST): UTC+2 (CEST)
- Postal code: 274 01
- Website: www.obeckralovice.cz

Královice is a municipality and village in Kladno District in the Central Bohemian Region of the Czech Republic. It has about 300 inhabitants.

== Etymology ==
The name is probably derived from the Czech word král (i.e. 'king'), meaning "the village of king's people". It denoted a village founded on land belonging to the king. There is also a theory that the name was derived from the surname Král, meaning "the village of Král's people".

== Geography ==
Královice is located about 13 kilometres (8 mi) north of Kladno and 27 km (17 mi) northwest of Prague. It lies in an agricultural landscape of the Lower Ohře Table. The stream Bakovský potok flows through the municipality.

== History ==
The first written mention of Královice is from 1316.

== Demographics ==
Historical population

Year	Pop.	±%
1869	267	—
1880	333	+24.7%
1890	278	−16.5%
1900	327	+17.6%
1910	308	−5.8%

Year	Pop.	±%
1921	295	−4.2%
1930	302	+2.4%
1950	234	−22.5%
1961	206	−12.0%
1970	202	−1.9%

Year	Pop.	±%
1980	154	−23.8%
1991	119	−22.7%
2001	120	+0.8%
2011	137	+14.2%
2021	253	+84.7%

Source: Censuses

== Transport ==
Královice is located on the railway line Louny–Kralupy nad Vltavou.

== Sights ==
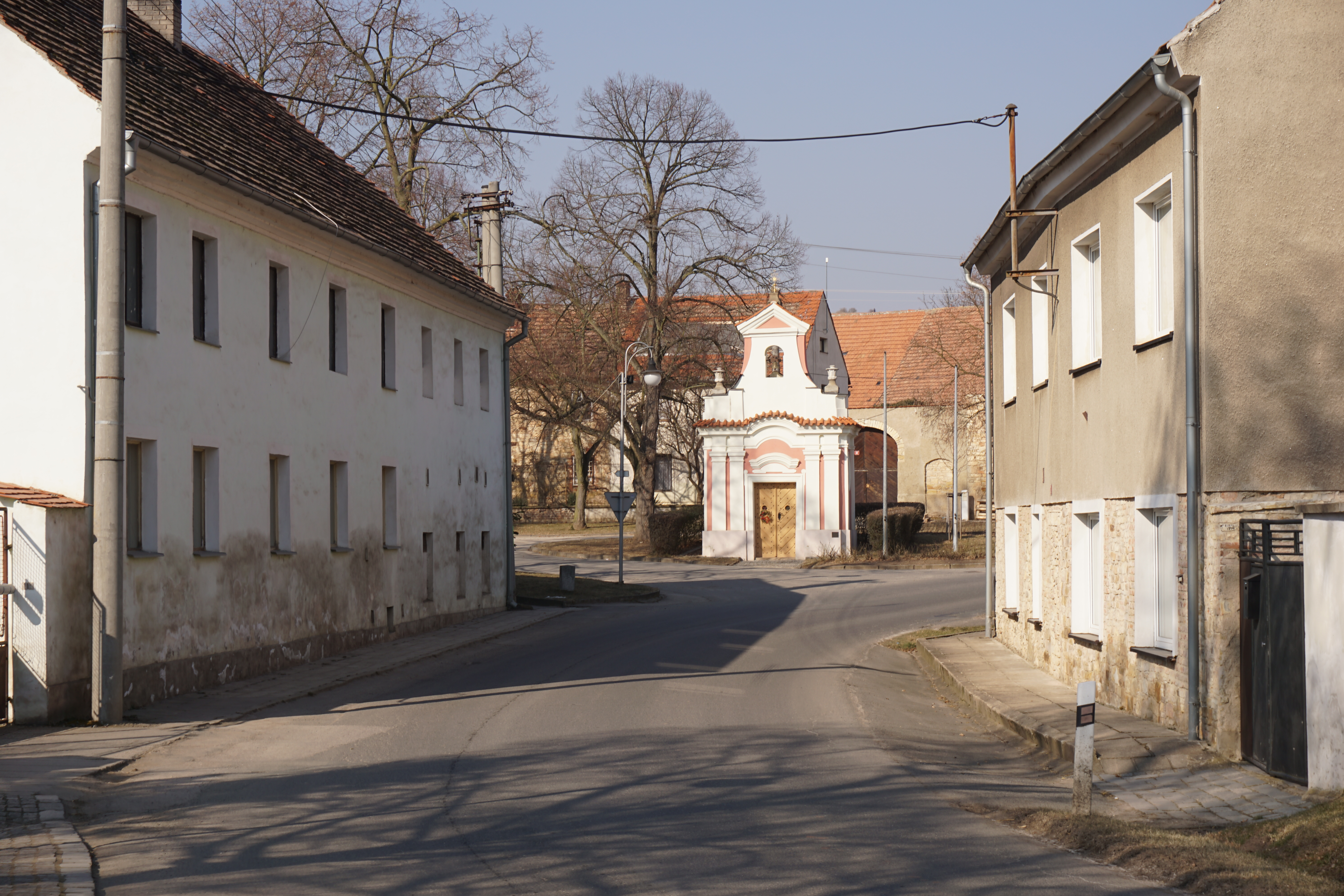
View towards the chapel

The main landmark of Královice is a Baroque stone arch bridge over the Bakovský potok in the centre of the village. The bridge was built shortly after 1871 and is decorated with statues of saints Wenceslaus and John of Nepomuk. There is also a small chapel from the second half of the 18th century.
