= Dřínov (Kladno District) =

- Municipality
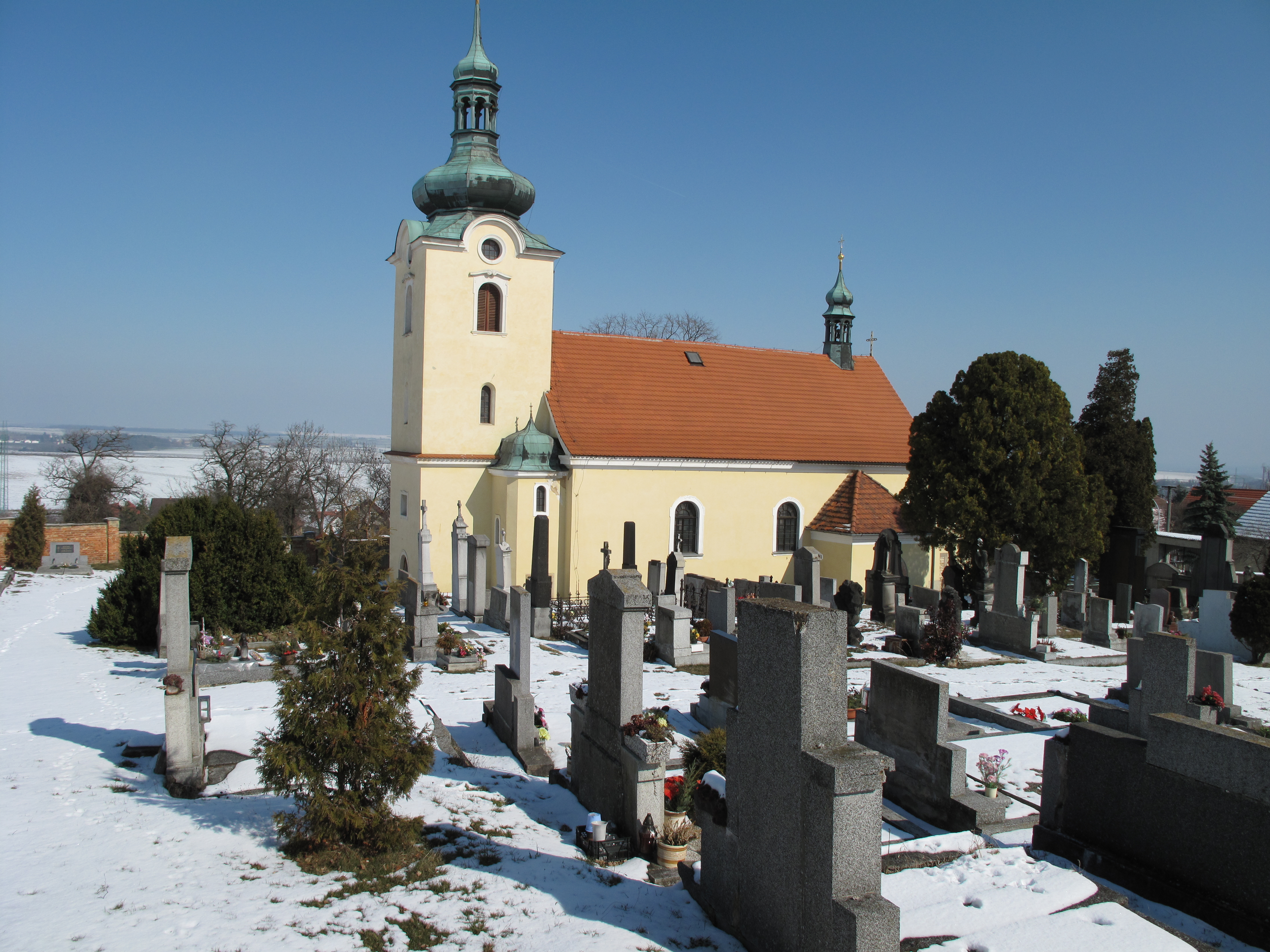
- Church of Saint Luke the Evangelist

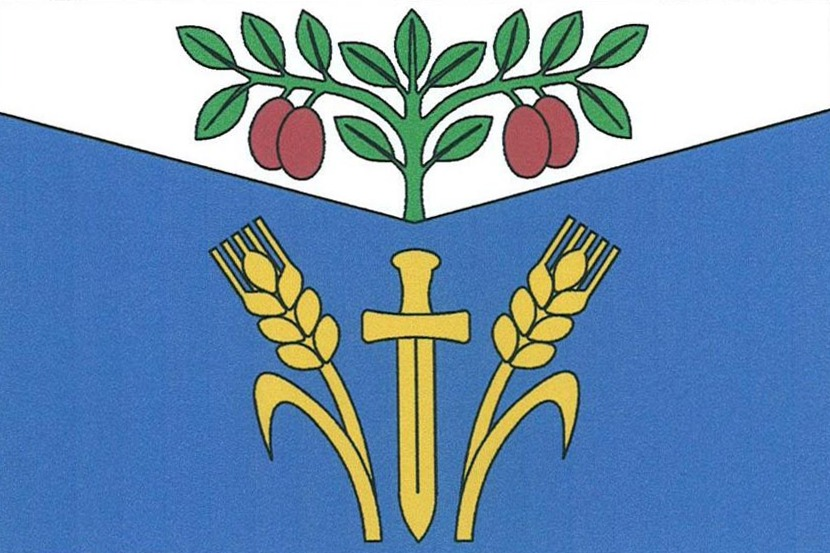
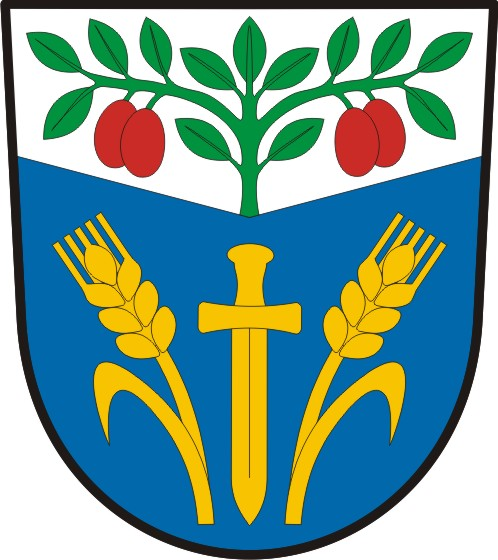
- Flag Coat of arms

- Location in the Czech Republic
- Coordinates: 50°16′32″N 14°4′11″E
- Country: Czech Republic
- Region: Central Bohemian
- District: Kladno
- First mentioned: 1316

Area
  - Total: 6.52 km^{2} (2.52 sq mi)
- Elevation: 270 m (890 ft)

Population (2026-01-01)
  - Total: 332
  - Density: 50.9/km^{2} (132/sq mi)
- Time zone: UTC+1 (CET)
  - Summer (DST): UTC+2 (CEST)
- Postal codes: 273 71, 274 01
- Website: www.obec-drinov.cz

Dřínov is a municipality and village in Kladno District in the Central Bohemian Region of the Czech Republic. It has about 300 inhabitants.

== Administrative division ==
Dřínov consists of two municipal parts (in brackets population according to the 2021 census):

- Dřínov (292)
- Drchkov (42)

== Demographics ==
Historical population
Year	Pop.	±%
1869	468	—
1880	540	+15.4%
1890	556	+3.0%
1900	630	+13.3%
1910	656	+4.1%
1921	693	+5.6%
1930	683	−1.4%
1950	425	−37.8%
1961	385	−9.4%
1970	389	+1.0%
1980	296	−23.9%
1991	259	−12.5%
2001	253	−2.3%
2011	325	+28.5%
2021	334	+2.8%
Source: Censuses
