= Kyšice =

Kyšice may refer to places in the Czech Republic:

- Kyšice (Kladno District), a municipality and village in the Central Bohemian Region
- Kyšice (Plzeň-City District), a municipality and village in the Plzeň Region
- Malé Kyšice, a municipality and village in the Central Bohemian Region
