= Kyšice (Kladno District) =

- Municipality
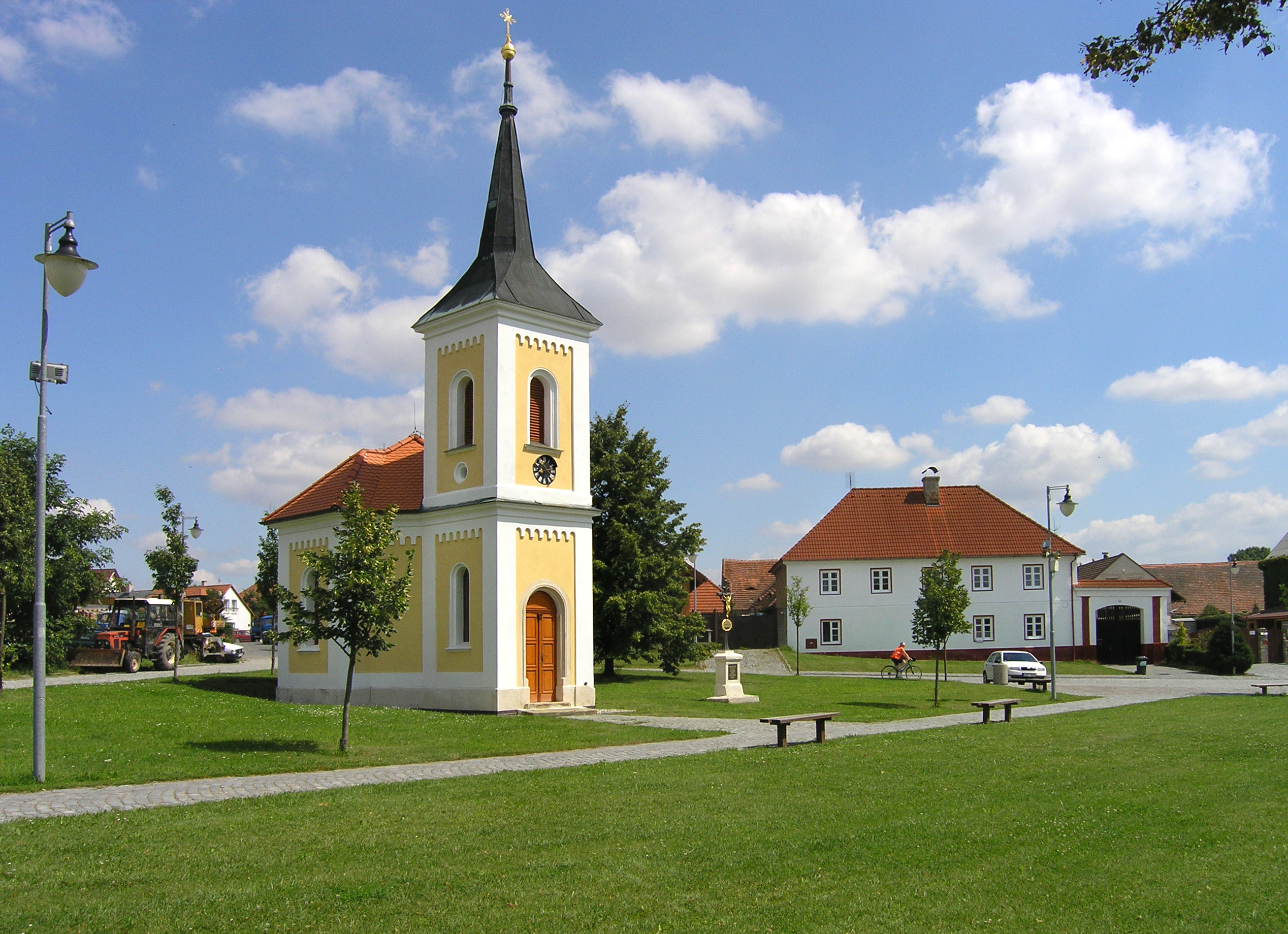
- Centre with the Chapel of Saint Florian

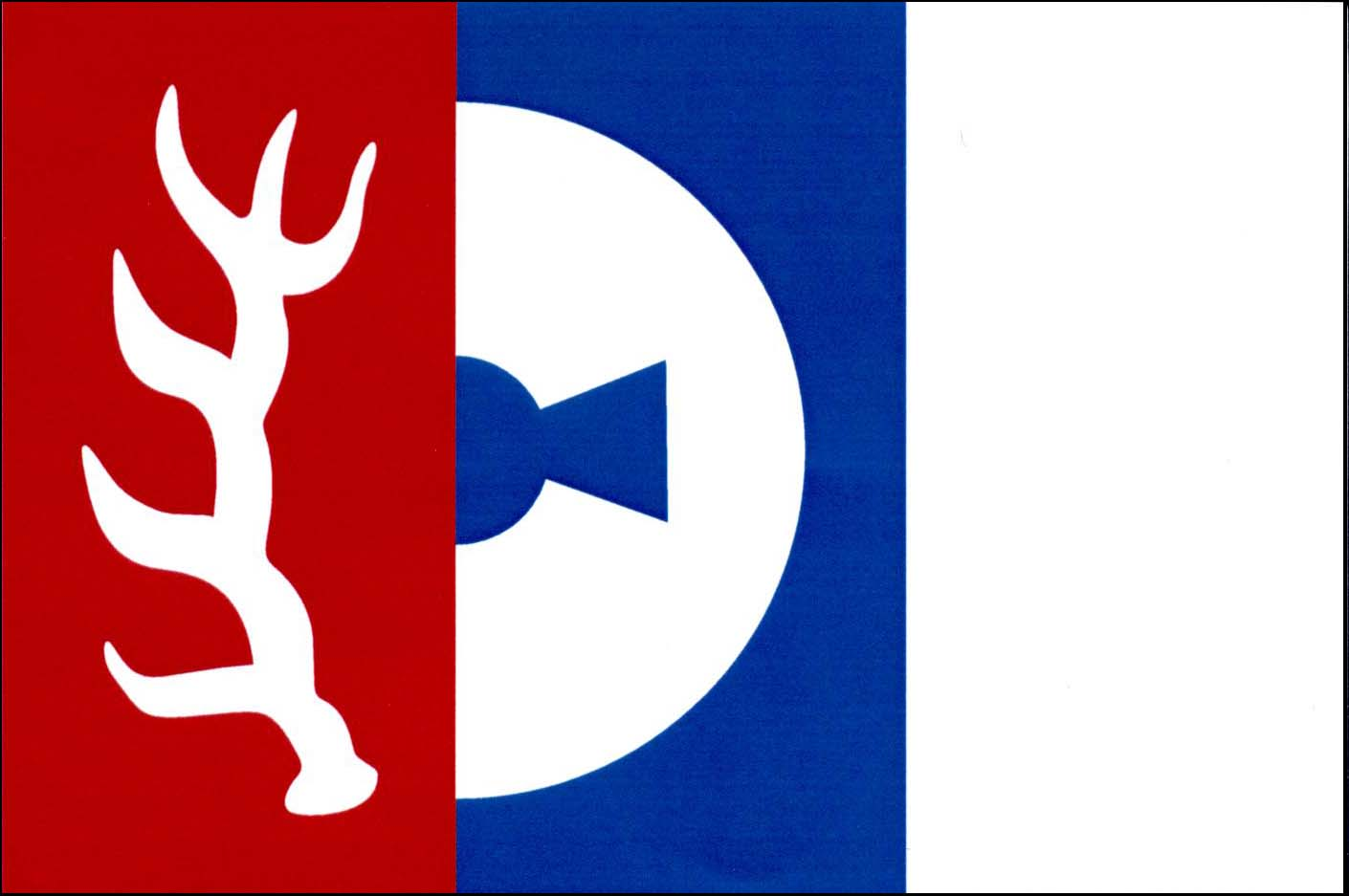
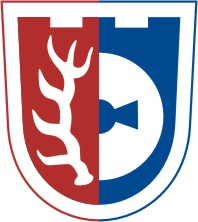
- Flag Coat of arms

- Location in the Czech Republic
- Coordinates: 50°5′29″N 14°6′23″E
- Country: Czech Republic
- Region: Central Bohemian
- District: Kladno
- First mentioned: 1316

Area
  - Total: 4.80 km^{2} (1.85 sq mi)
- Elevation: 396 m (1,299 ft)

Population (2026-01-01)
  - Total: 614
  - Density: 128/km^{2} (331/sq mi)
- Time zone: UTC+1 (CET)
  - Summer (DST): UTC+2 (CEST)
- Postal code: 273 51
- Website: www.obec-kysice.cz

Kyšice is a municipality and village in Kladno District in the Central Bohemian Region of the Czech Republic. It has about 600 inhabitants.

== Etymology ==
The name is derived from the personal name Kych, meaning "the village of Kych's people".

== Geography ==
Kyšice is located about 5 kilometres (3 mi) south of Kladno and 15 km (9 mi) west of Prague. It lies in an agricultural landscape in the Křivoklát Highlands. The highest point is the hill Vinohrádek at 430 m (1,410 ft) above sea level. There are two fishponds in the municipal territory.

== History ==
The first written mention of Kyšice is from 1316. The village was founded near a fortress that allegedly existed as early as 1249. It was owned by various lesser noblemen. In the 17th century, it became part of the Červený Újezd estate and shared its owners and destiny.

== Demographics ==
Historical population

Year	Pop.	±%
1869	435	—
1880	474	+9.0%
1890	508	+7.2%
1900	598	+17.7%
1910	639	+6.9%

Year	Pop.	±%
1921	541	−15.3%
1930	614	+13.5%
1950	575	−6.4%
1961	579	+0.7%
1970	528	−8.8%

Year	Pop.	±%
1980	520	−1.5%
1991	488	−6.2%
2001	558	+14.3%
2011	591	+5.9%
2021	622	+5.2%

Source: Censuses

== Transport ==
There are no railways or major roads passing through the municipality.

== Sights ==
The main landmark of Kyšice is the Chapel of Saint Florian from 1863. Next to the chapel is a crucifix from 1888.
