= Malé Kyšice =

- Municipality
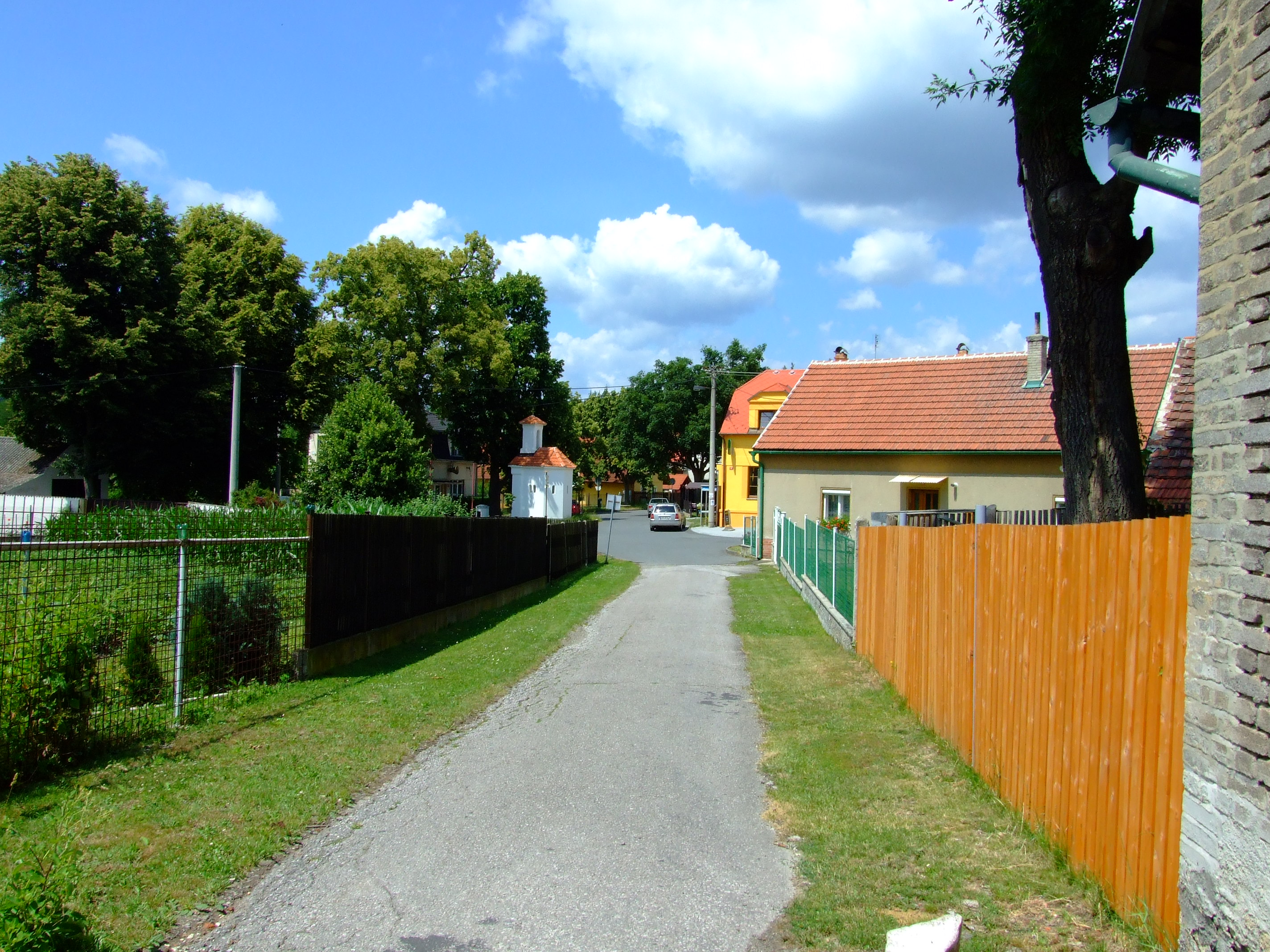
- View towards the centre

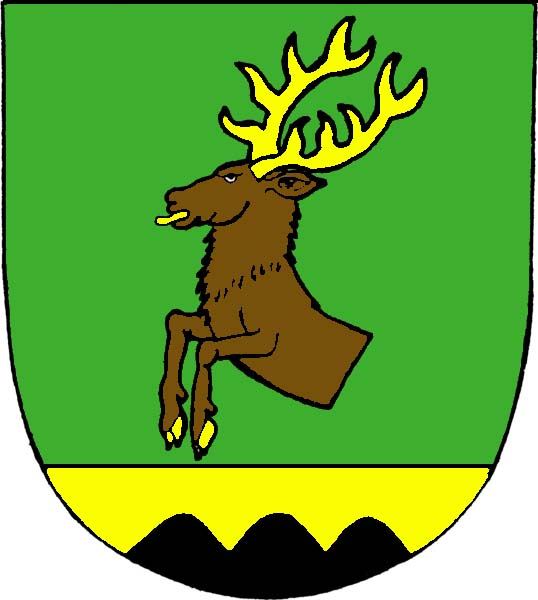
- Flag Coat of arms

- Location in the Czech Republic
- Coordinates: 50°3′40″N 14°5′25″E
- Country: Czech Republic
- Region: Central Bohemian
- District: Kladno
- First mentioned: 1316

Area
  - Total: 4.19 km^{2} (1.62 sq mi)
- Elevation: 370 m (1,210 ft)

Population (2026-01-01)
  - Total: 562
  - Density: 134/km^{2} (347/sq mi)
- Time zone: UTC+1 (CET)
  - Summer (DST): UTC+2 (CEST)
- Postal code: 273 51
- Website: www.malekysice.cz

Malé Kyšice is a municipality and village in Kladno District in the Central Bohemian Region of the Czech Republic. It has about 600 inhabitants.

== Demographics ==
Historical population
Year	Pop.	±%
1869	127	—
1880	148	+16.5%
1890	208	+40.5%
1900	190	−8.7%
1910	189	−0.5%
1921	238	+25.9%
1930	288	+21.0%
1950	291	+1.0%
1961	284	−2.4%
1970	249	−12.3%
1980	258	+3.6%
1991	241	−6.6%
2001	249	+3.3%
2011	413	+65.9%
2021	575	+39.2%
Source: Censuses
