= FZU =

The abbreviation FZU may refer to:

- Fuzhou University, in Fujian, China
- Institute of Physics of the Czech Academy of Sciences (Fyzikální ústav Akademie věd České republiky in Czech)
