= Dolní Břežany =

- Municipality
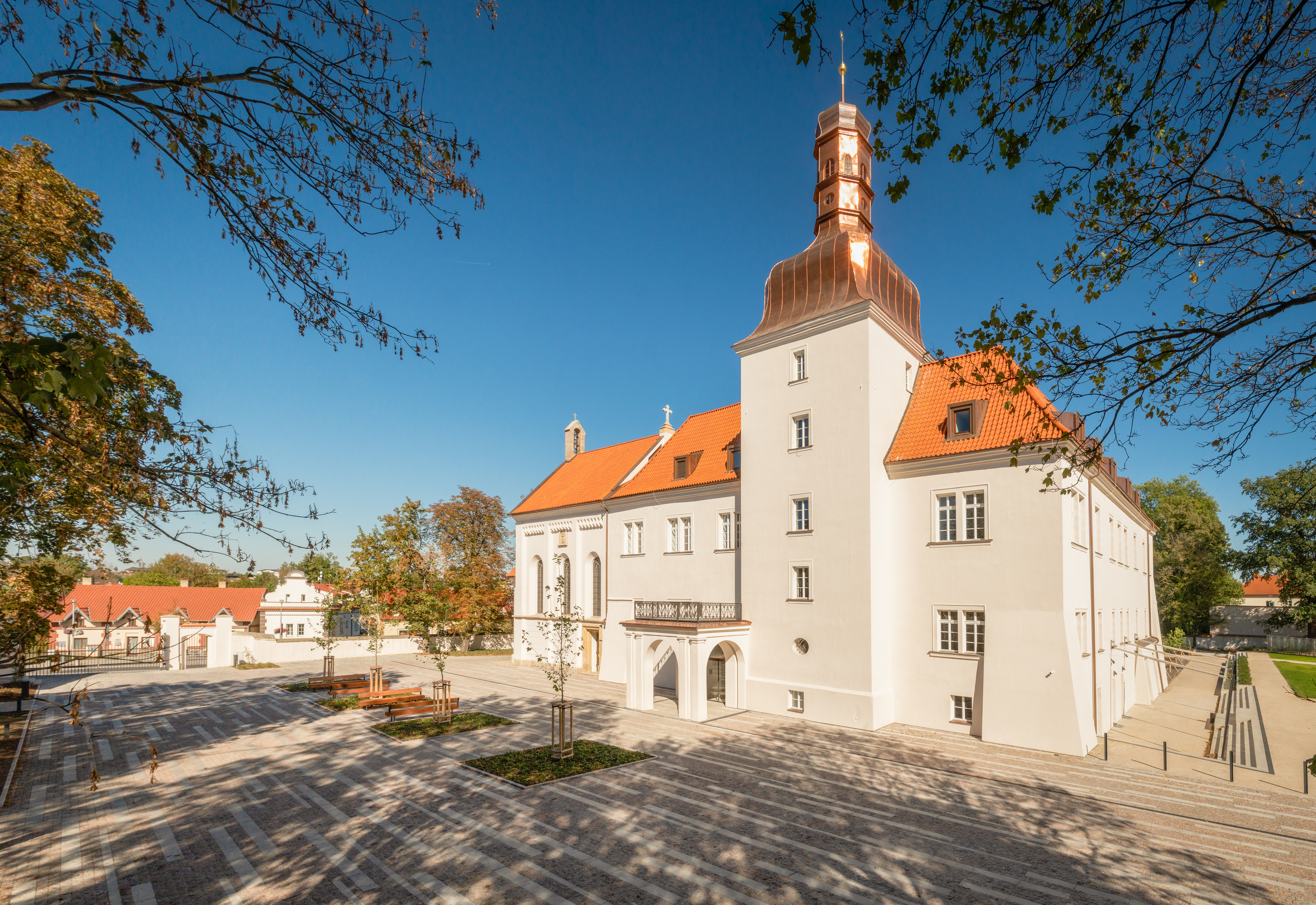
- Dolní Břežany Castle

- Flag Coat of arms

- Location in the Czech Republic
- Coordinates: 49°57′48″N 14°27′31″E
- Country: Czech Republic
- Region: Central Bohemian
- District: Prague-West
- First mentioned: 1332

Area
  - Total: 10.63 km^{2} (4.10 sq mi)
- Elevation: 334 m (1,096 ft)

Population (2026-01-01)
  - Total: 4,806
  - Density: 452.1/km^{2} (1,171/sq mi)
- Time zone: UTC+1 (CET)
  - Summer (DST): UTC+2 (CEST)
- Postal code: 252 41
- Website: www.dolnibrezany.cz

Dolní Břežany (Czech pronunciation: [ˈdolɲiː ˈbr̝ɛʒanɪ]) is a municipality and village in Prague-West District in the Central Bohemian Region of the Czech Republic. It has about 4,800 inhabitants. Dolní Břežany is known for the hill Závist with the remains of a Celtic oppidum, which is protected as a national cultural monument.

== Administrative division ==
Dolní Břežany consists of four municipal parts (in brackets population according to the 2021 census):

- Dolní Břežany (3,598)
- Jarov (88)
- Lhota (699)
- Zálepy (291)

== Etymology ==
The name Břežany is derived from the word břeh ('[river] bank' in Czech, but in old Czech also meaning 'hillside') or from the word březí ('birch forest'). The word břežané denoted people who live near a bank, hillside or birch forest, so Břežany was a village of such people. In the 17th century, when church owned two villages named Břežany and needed to distinguish them, this village became known as Dolní ('lower') Břežany.

== Geography ==
Dolní Břežany is located south of Prague, in its immediate vicinity. Most of the municipal territory lies in the Prague Plateau. The northwestern part lies in a tip of the Brdy Highlands and includes the highest point of Dolní Břežany, the hill Závist at 389 m (1,276 ft) above sea level. The Vltava River flows along the western municipal border. The brook Břežanský potok flows across the municipality into the Vltava and supplies several small fishponds.

== History ==
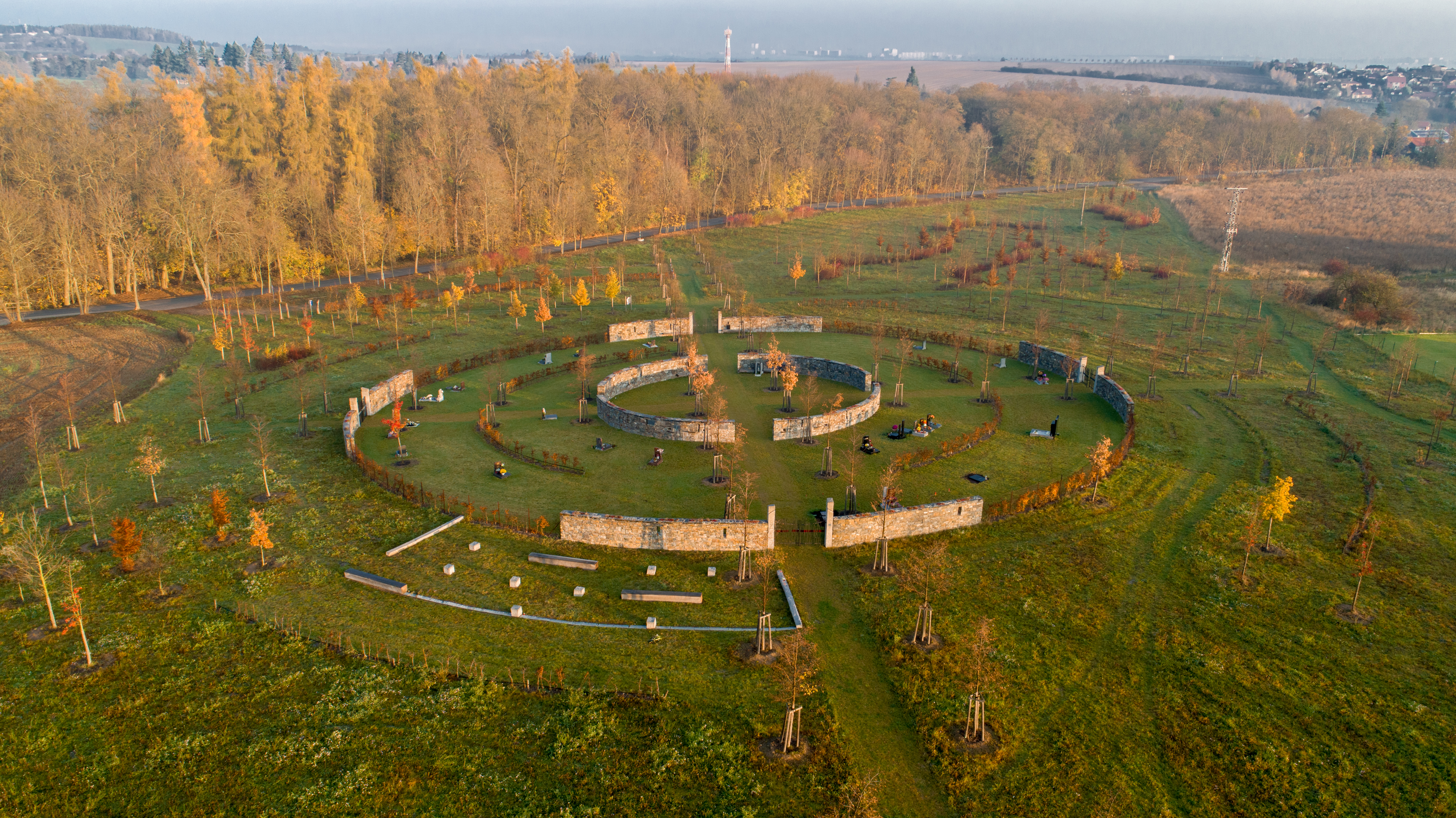
Modern Celtic-inspired cemetery

The first written mention of Břežany is from 1332. In 1364, Břežany and Lhota were acquired by the bishopric in Litomyšl, then they were owned by the Zbraslav Monastery. In 1436, King Sigismund pledged the estate to Bened of Nečtiny. Then the owners changed frequently. Between 1627 and 1632, the village changed its name to Dolní Břežany. From 1683 to 1715, Dolní Břežany was property of the Trauttmansdorff family, who sold it to the Prague archbishopric. The Prague archbishops owned it until 1945.

== Demographics ==
Historical population

Year	Pop.	±%
1869	753	—
1880	744	−1.2%
1890	864	+16.1%
1900	912	+5.6%
1910	919	+0.8%

Year	Pop.	±%
1921	926	+0.8%
1930	1,072	+15.8%
1950	1,075	+0.3%
1961	1,102	+2.5%
1970	1,055	−4.3%

Year	Pop.	±%
1980	1,102	+4.5%
1991	1,045	−5.2%
2001	1,444	+38.2%
2011	3,696	+156.0%
2021	4,676	+26.5%

Source: Censuses

== Economy ==
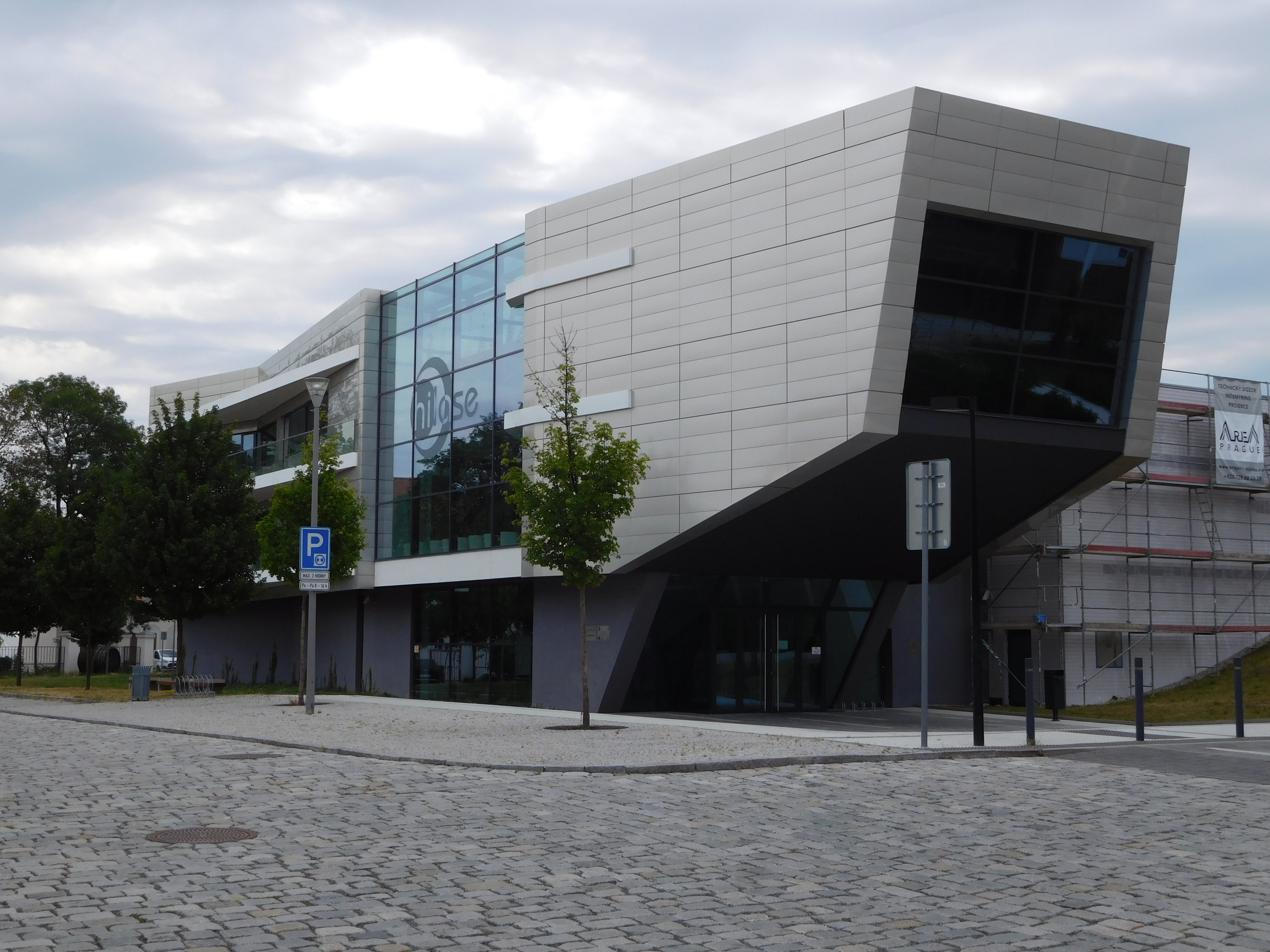
Building of the HiLASE research centre

Dolní Břežany is the seat of HiLASE Centre. It is a workplace of the Institute of Physics of the Czech Academy of Sciences that deals with the innovation of laser technology. It was founded in 2011. With about 100 employees, it is the main employer in the municipality.

== Transport ==
There are no major roads passing through the municipality. The Prague–Vrané nad Vltavou–Čerčany/Dobříš line runs through the western part of the municipality and is served by Esko lines. The train stop called Dolní Břežany-Jarov is located just outside the municipal territory.

== Sights ==
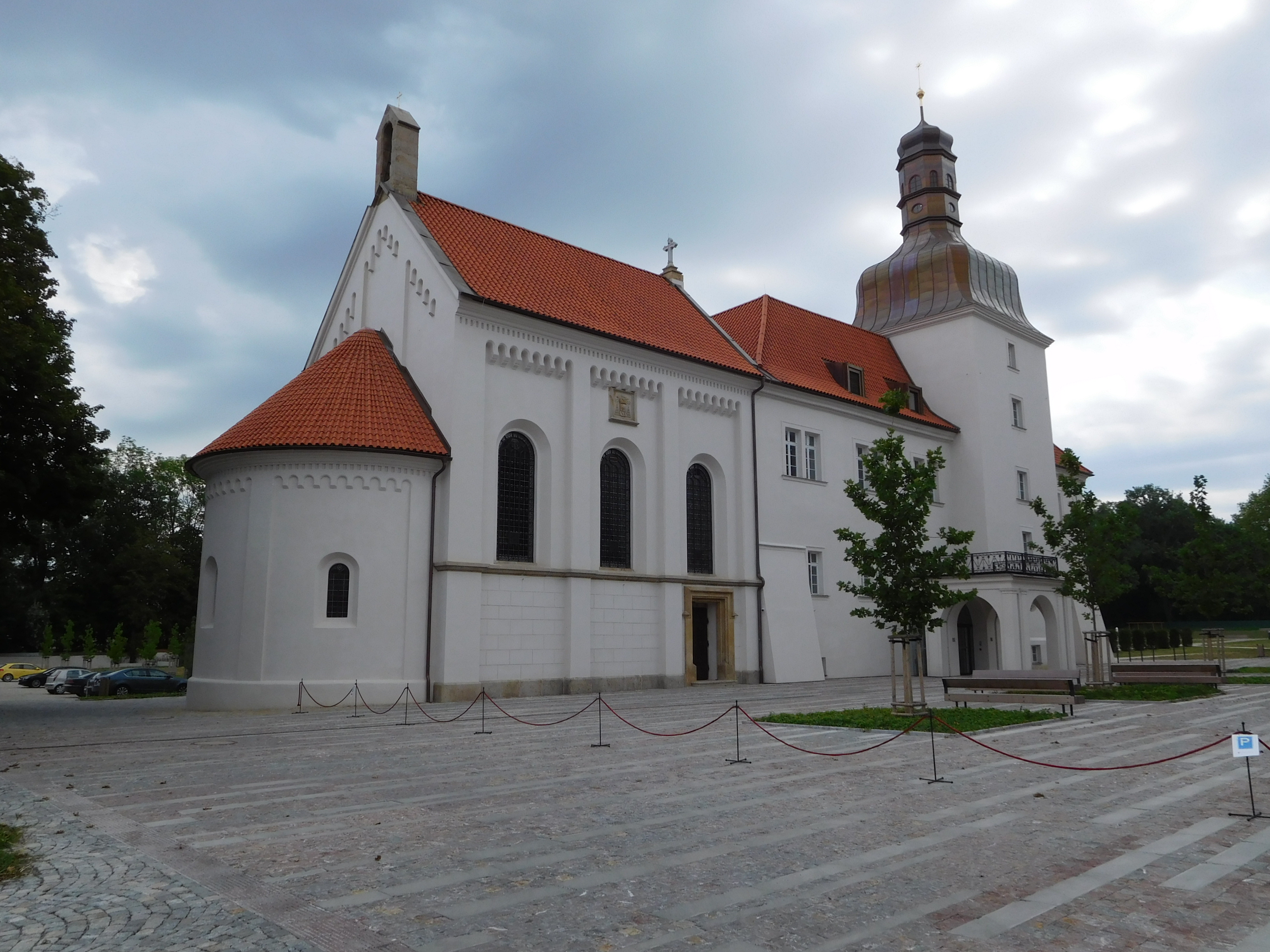
Chapel of Saint Mary Magdalene

The main landmark of Dolní Břežany is a Renaissance castle, which was created by rebuilding a medieval fortress. It was built during the rule of Krištof Želínský of Sebuzín between 1590 and 1606. The Chapel of Saint Mary Magdalene was added to the castle in the 1880s. Today it serves as a hotel.

There are the remains of a Celtic oppidum on the hill Závist. The site was already inhabited in the late Stone Age, but the largest settlement was in the 9th–8th centuries BC and then in the 5th–4th centuries BC. The oppidum disappeared in the 1st century BC. It is the largest prehistoric fortified complex in Bohemia. Most of the site is forested and systematic archaeological research ended in 1990. The site is protected as a national cultural monument. A wooden observation tower was built on the top of Závist in 2021. It is 32 m (105 ft) high.

== Notable people ==
- Eduard Prchal (1911–1984), pilot
