= Institute of Physics of the Czech Academy of Sciences =

Public research institute

- Fyzikální ústav Akademie věd České republiky
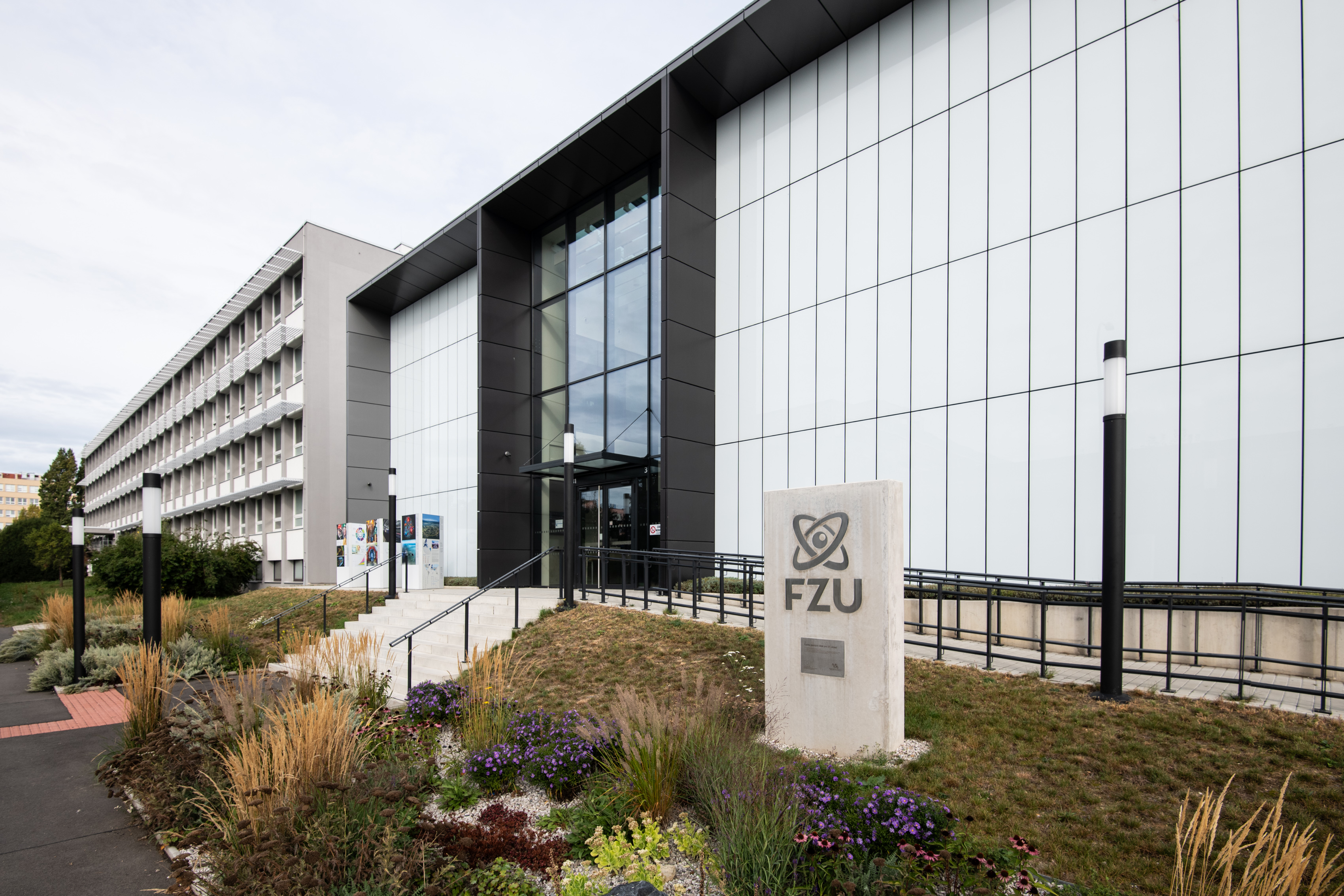
- Abbreviation: FZU
- Formation: 1 January 1954; 72 years ago
- Location: Prague, Czech Republic
- Coordinates: 50.123471°N 14.468835°E
- Fields: Physics research
- Director: Michael Prouza
- Parent organization: Czech Academy of Sciences
- Staff: c. 1100
- Students: c. 130
- Website: https://www.fzu.cz

Institute of Physics of the Czech Academy of Sciences (FZU, Fyzikální ústav Akademie věd České republiky) is a public research institution in the Czech Republic and a part of the Czech Academy of Sciences. The Institute specialises in fundamental and applied research across five fields: particle physics, condensed matter physics and solid-state physics, optics and physics of plasma. FZU is also involved in education at the university level, supervision of Master and PhD students and science communication.

== Research and research divisions ==
FZU is an internationally recognized center for scientific research located in Prague. The institute engages in many research areas, but it is particularly well-known in the fields of spintronics, structure analysis and crystallography, atomic and molecular structures, and classical and quantum optics.

FZU has five research divisions, each comprises several departments. Division of Solid State Physics is located in Prague - Střešovice district (north-western part of Prague), Division of High Power Lasers is mostly in Dolní Břežany, small town near the southern border of Prague; three other divisions are located in the "Slovanka" research complex in Prague - Libeň.

=== Division of Elementary Particle Physics ===
The Division of Elementary Particle Physics is located in Prague Slovanka research complex. It comprises five departments: Department of Astroparticle Physics, Department of Experimental Particle Physics, Department of Theory of Elementary Particles, Department of Detector Development and Data Processing and Department of Cosmology and Gravitational Physics.

The work of the Division is to investigate the structure of matter at the level of subatomic particles and the forces that act between them. It participates in the ATLAS experiment at the LHC accelerator at CERN and the astroparticle physics experiment carried out by the Pierre Auger Observatory in Argentina.

As a part of the international CALICE project, it is involved in the development of detectors for the planned International Linear Collider (ILC). The Division is also a major contributor to the development and construction of the Cherenkov Telescope Array (CTA).

To a lesser extent, the Division also participates in other experiments at CERN (ALICE, TOTEM), the NOvA neutrino experiment, the Vera C. Rubin Observatory project and the LISA cosmic gravitational wave detector.

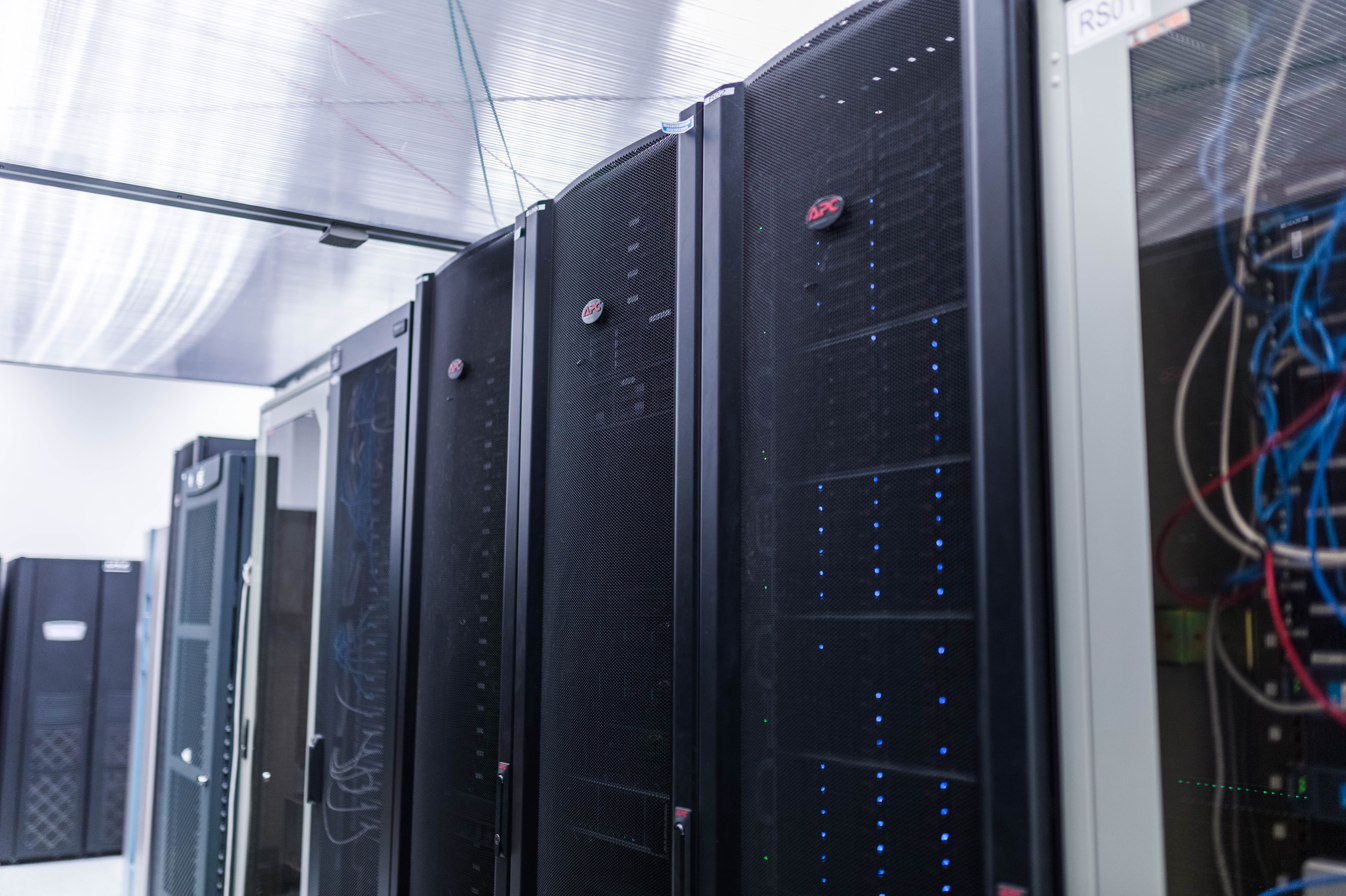
Computing centre in FZU

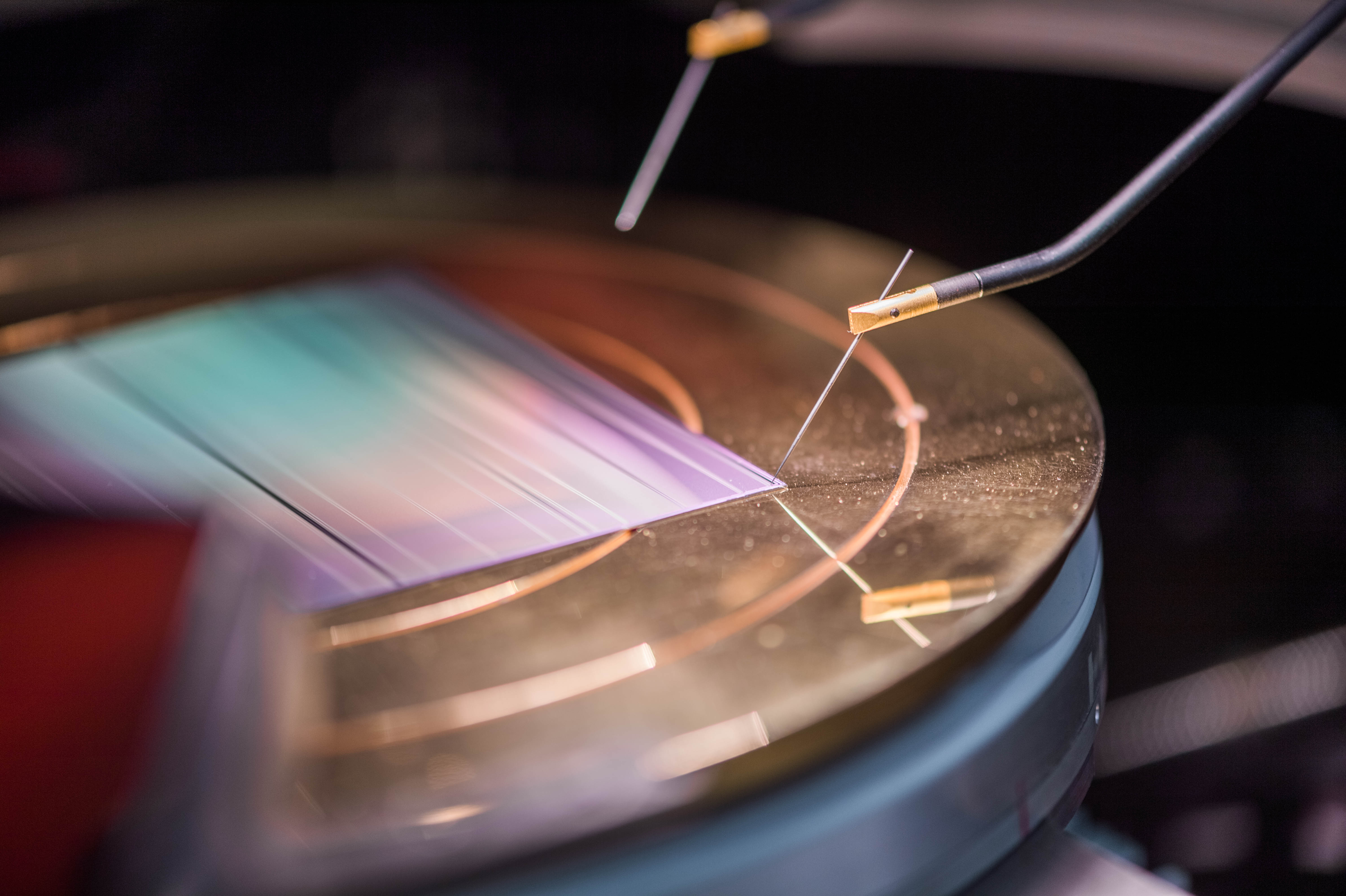
Laboratory for silicon particle detector testing (probe detail)

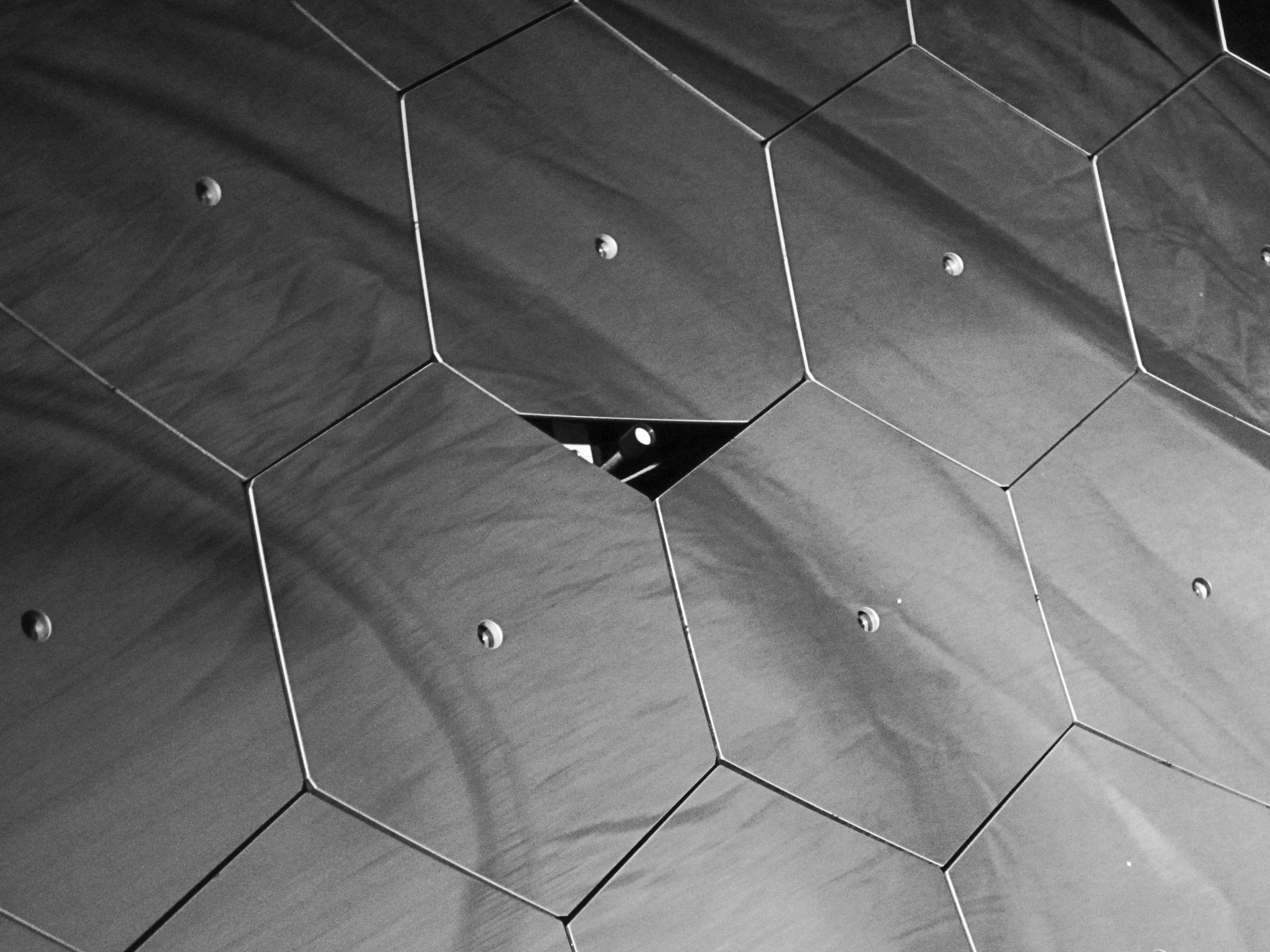
Mirrors of the fluorescence detector at Pierre Auger Observatory in Argentina

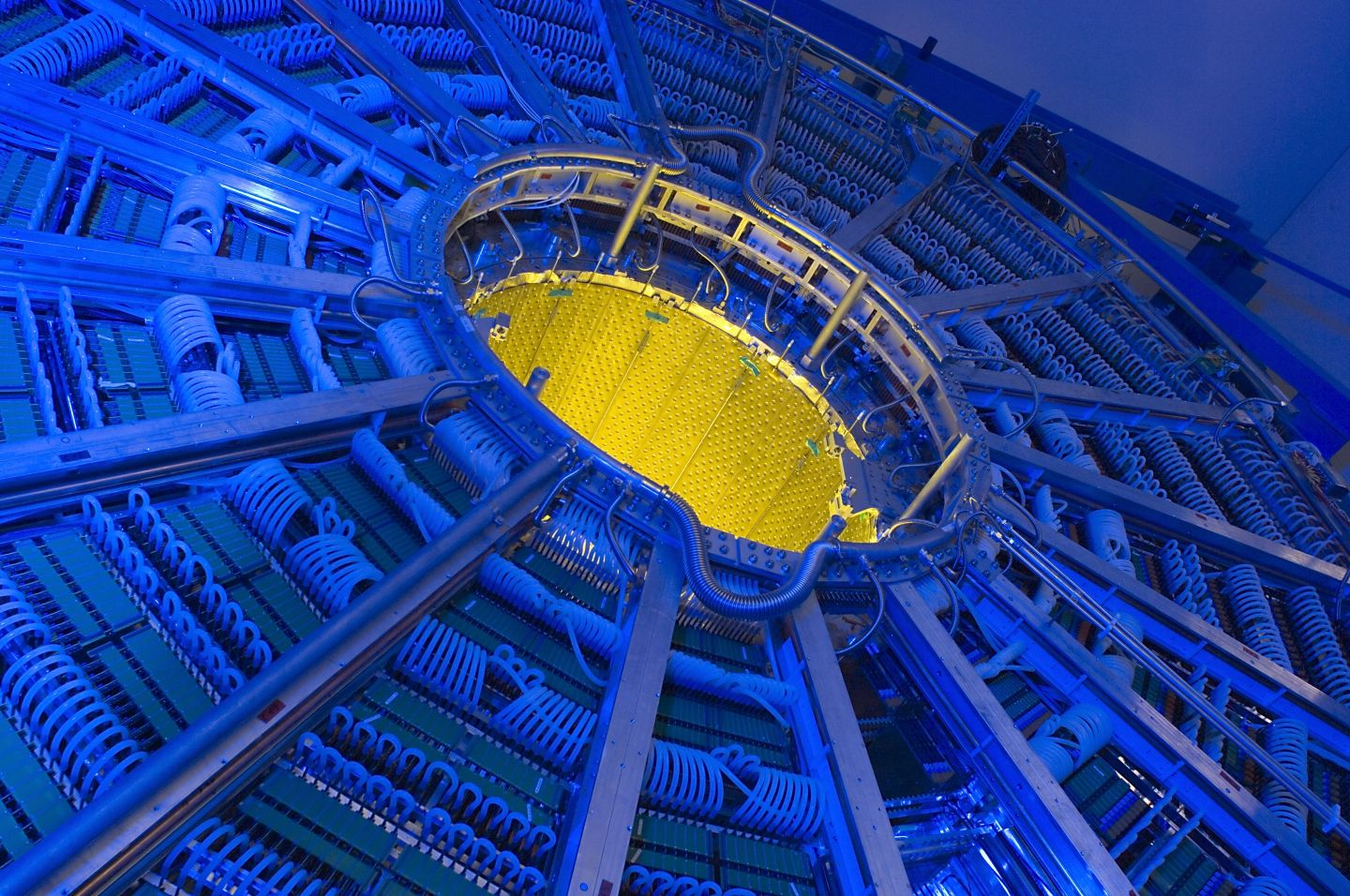
Detector ALICE in CERN

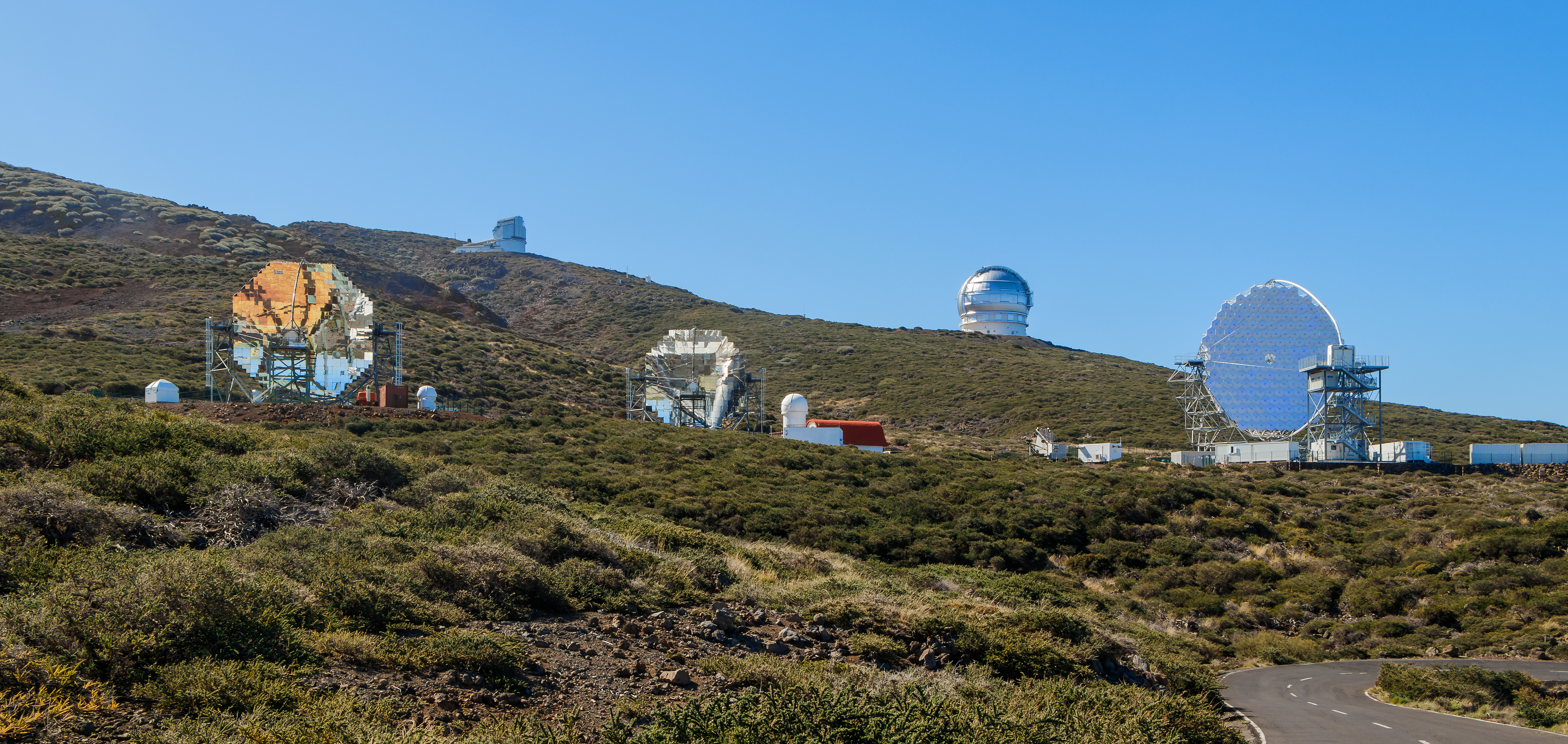
Northern site of Cherenkov Telescope Array (La Palma)

=== Division of Condensed Matter Physics ===
The Department of Condensed Matter Physics has six departments in the research complex Slovanka: the Department of Magnetic Measurements and Materials (which also includes a Joint Laboratory of Magnetic Studies with the MFF UK), Department of Dielectrics, Department of Materials Analysis, Department of Functional Materials, Department of Condensed Matter Theory and Department of Chemistry.

The Division's research focuses on theoretical and experimental studies of the structure and properties of mainly multiferroic, piezoelectric and spintronic materials, liquid crystals, modern metallic materials, functional engineering materials such as shape memory alloys, diamond coatings, Heusler alloys and thin films.

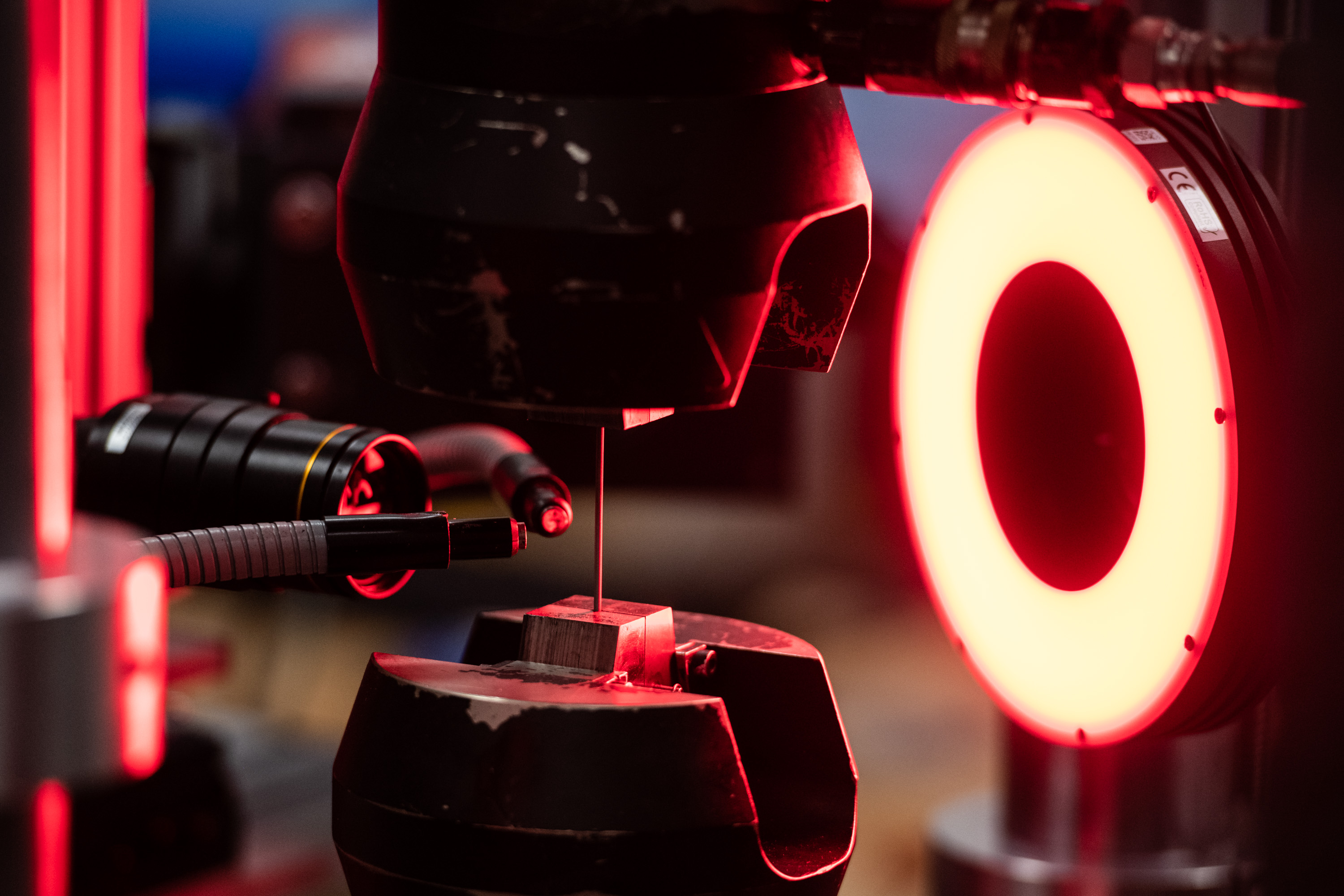
Detail of Instron deformation machine in Department of Functional Materials

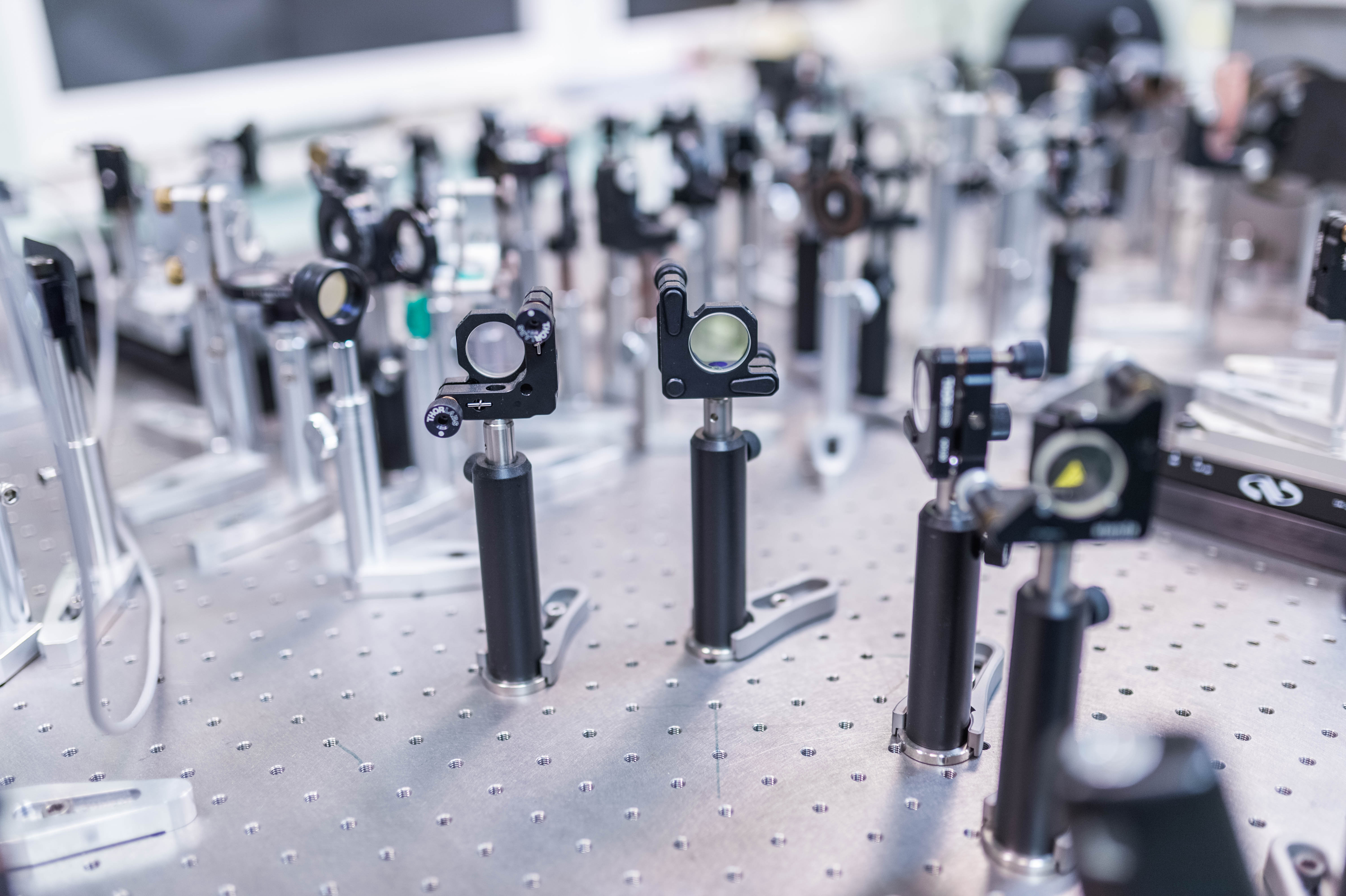
Time-domain terahertz spectrometers (detail) in Department of Dielectrics

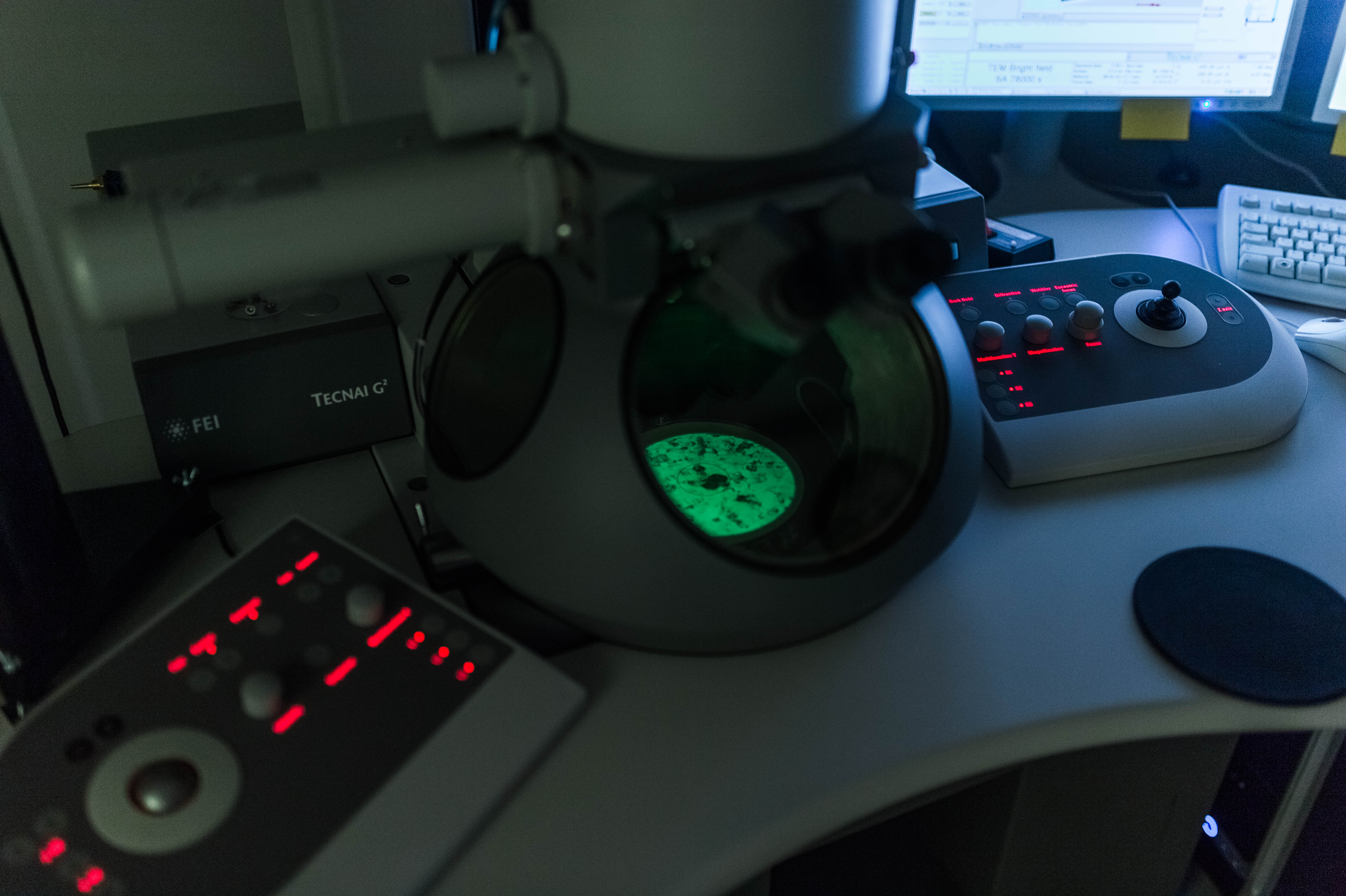
Transmission electron microscope in Department of Material Analysis

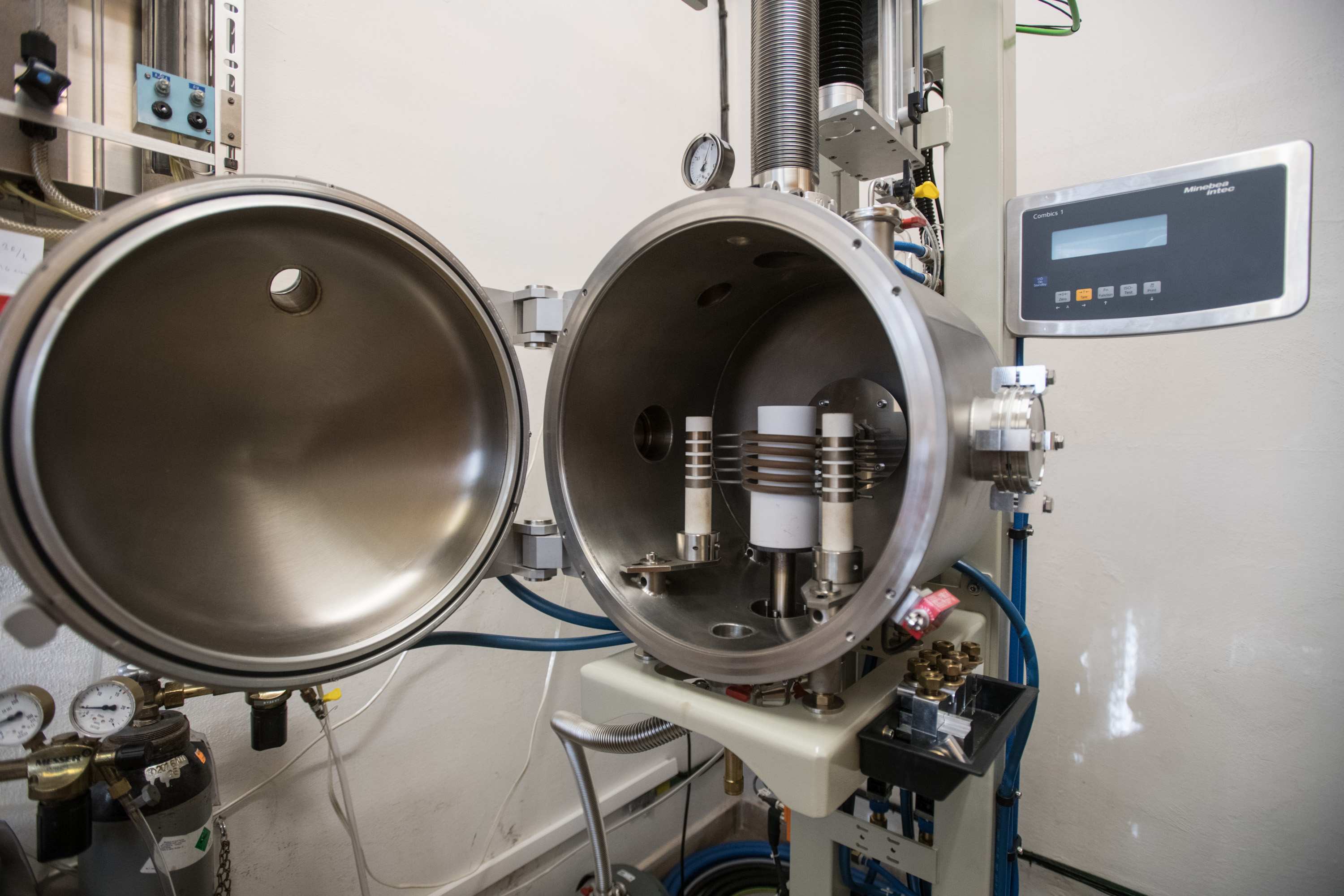
Crystal-growth apparatus (Czochralski method)

=== Division of Solid State Physics ===
The Division is located in Prague at Cukrovarnická Street and has a total of 7 departments: Department of Surfaces and Molecular Structures, Department of Spintronics and Nanoelectronics (which also includes a joint optospintronics laboratory with MFF UK), Department of Structure Analysis, Department of Magnetics and Superconductors, Department of Thin Films and Nanostructures, Department of Semiconductors and Department of Optical Materials

Research in the Division focuses primarily on magnetically and optically active materials, nanocrystalline forms of silicon, III-V semiconductors, diamond and graphite, and nanostructures for biological, medical and microelectronic applications.

Researchers at FZU and Johannes Gutenberg University Mainz helped predict altermagnetism, a form of magnetic order that combines features of ferromagnetism and antiferromagnetism. FZU researchers took part in experiments at the Swiss Light Source that confirmed altermagnetism in manganese telluride in 2024. Libor Šmejkal, Jairo Sinova and Tomáš Jungwirth received the 2026 EPS Europhysics Prize for the discovery.

FZU researchers develop electron diffraction methods for determining the atomic structure of tiny crystals. In 2017, they worked with French laboratories to locate hydrogen atoms in nanocrystals. FZU also develops JANA, software for analysing crystal structures from diffraction measurements, including their magnetic ordering. Lukáš Palatinus received the 2026 Gjønnes Medal from the International Union of Crystallography for his work in electron crystallography.

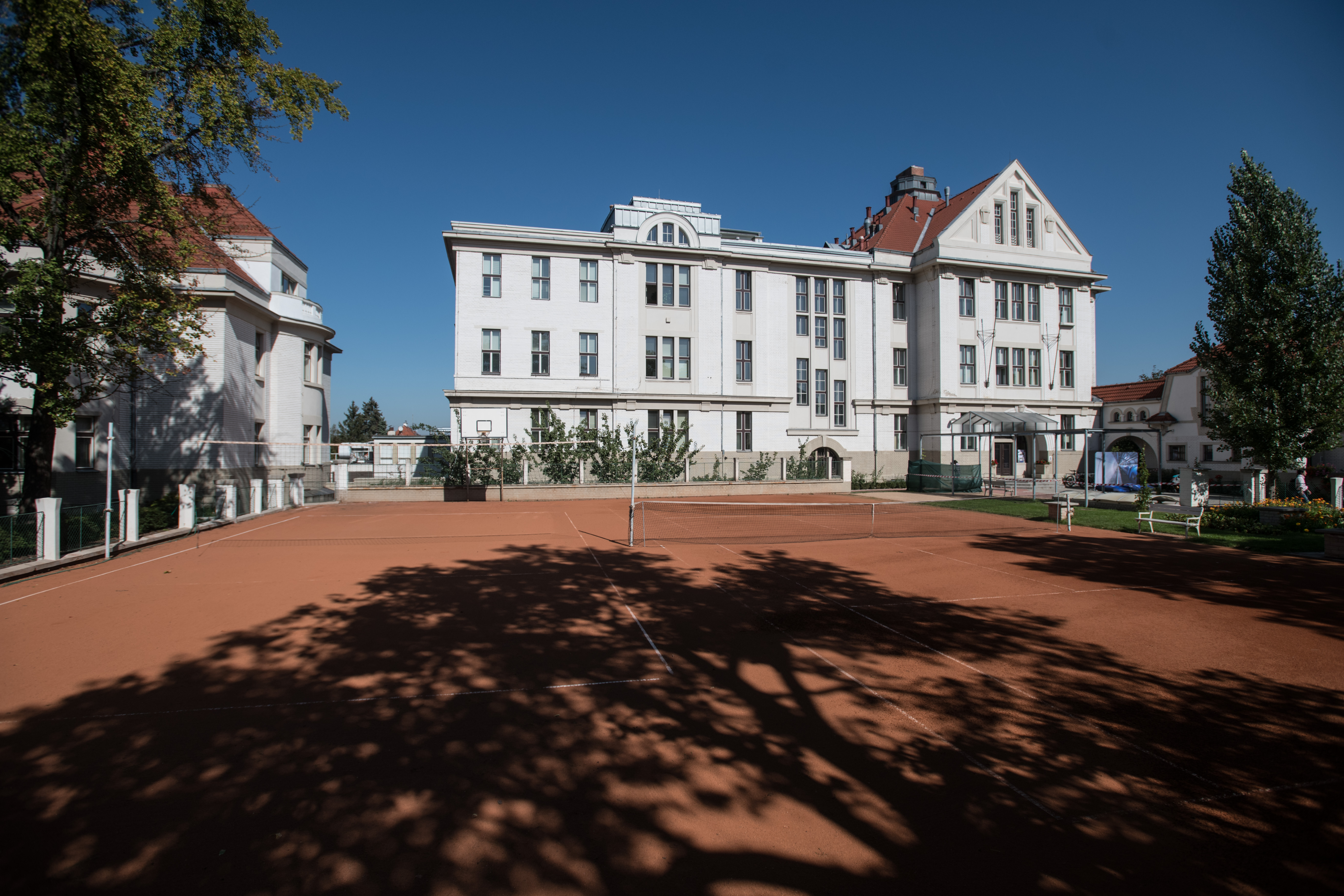
Division headquarters in Cukrovarnická street (Prague)

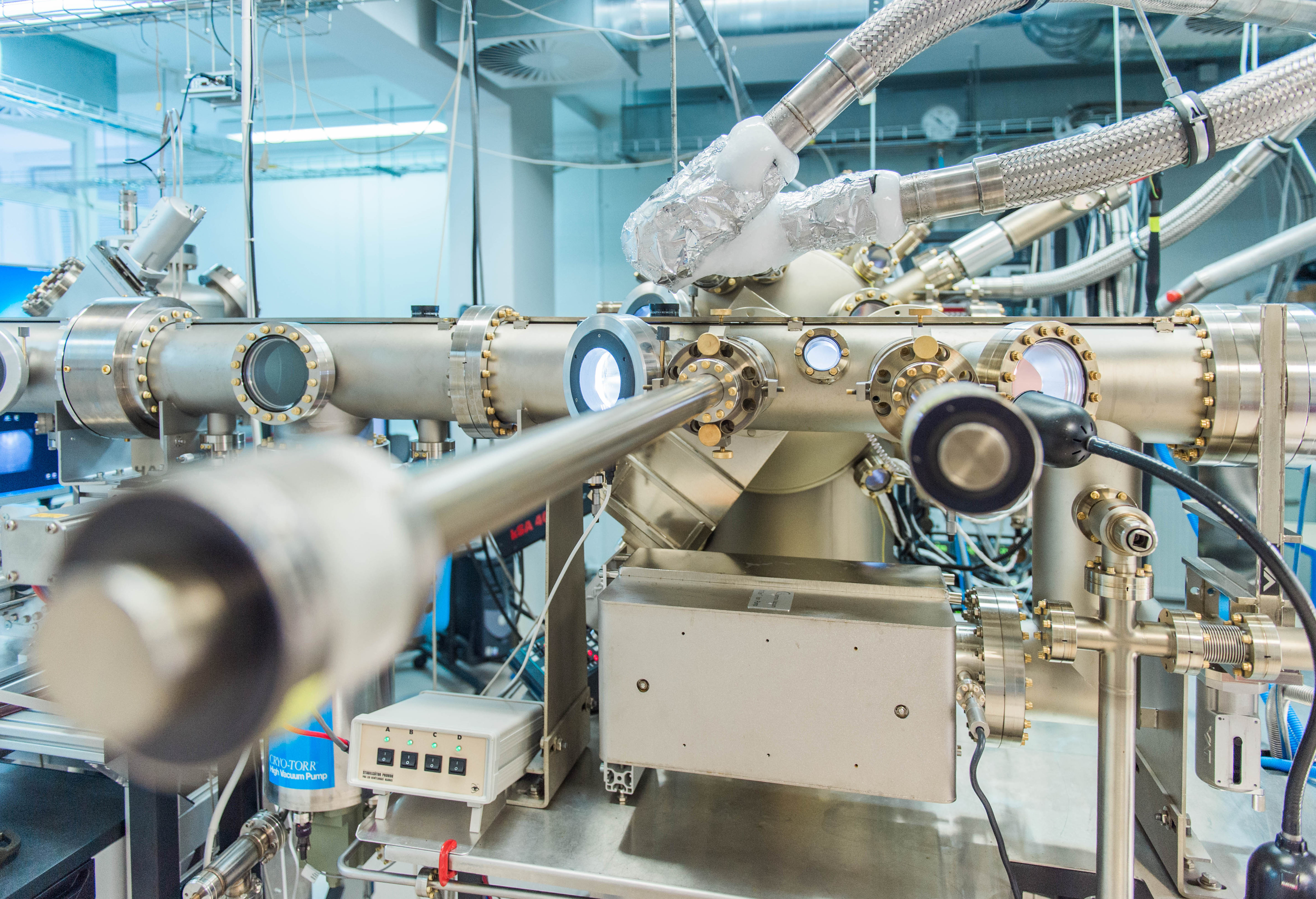
Apparatus for molecular-beam epitaxy in Department of Spintronics

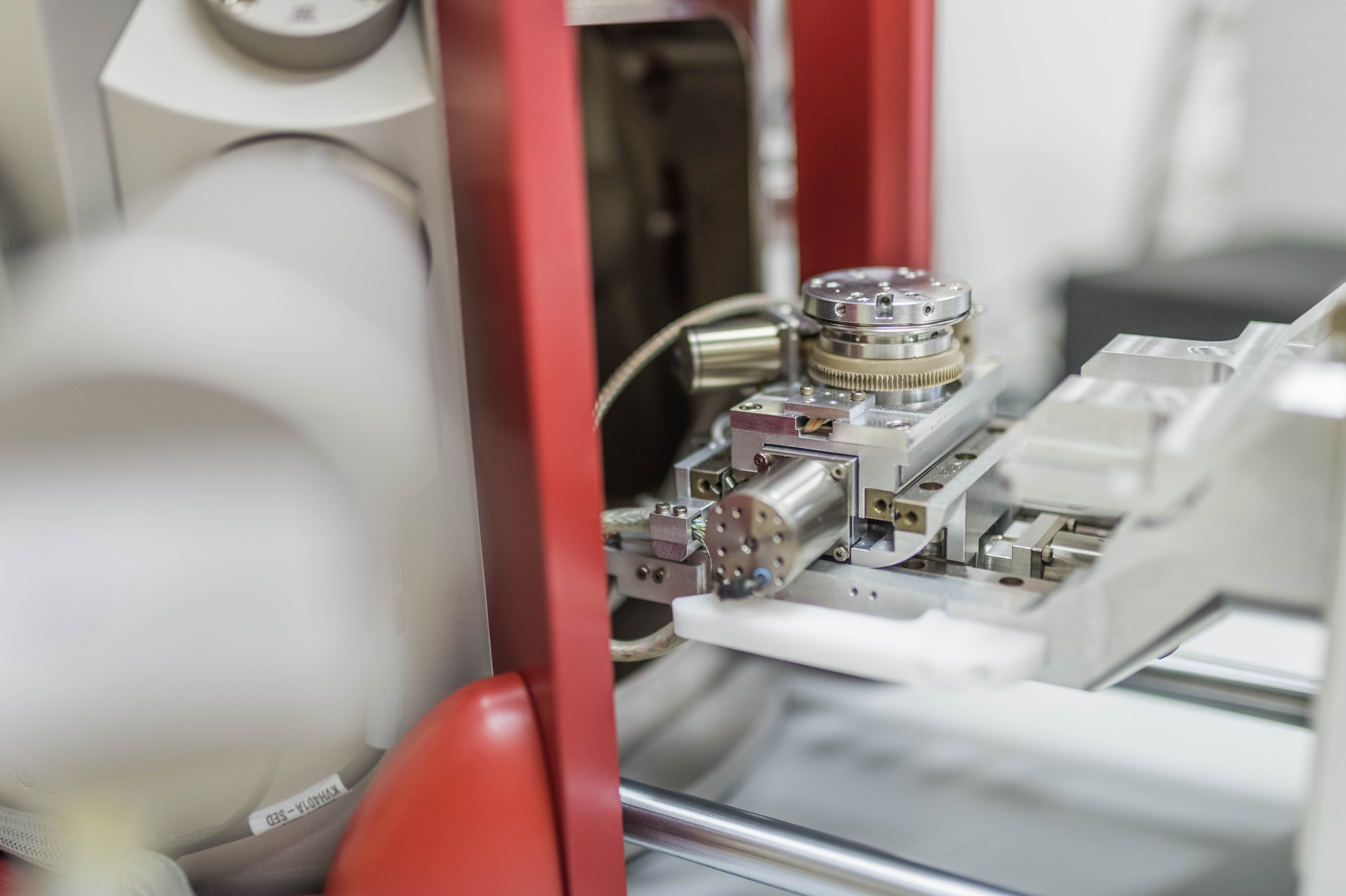
Detail of scanning electron microscope Maia 3 Tescan

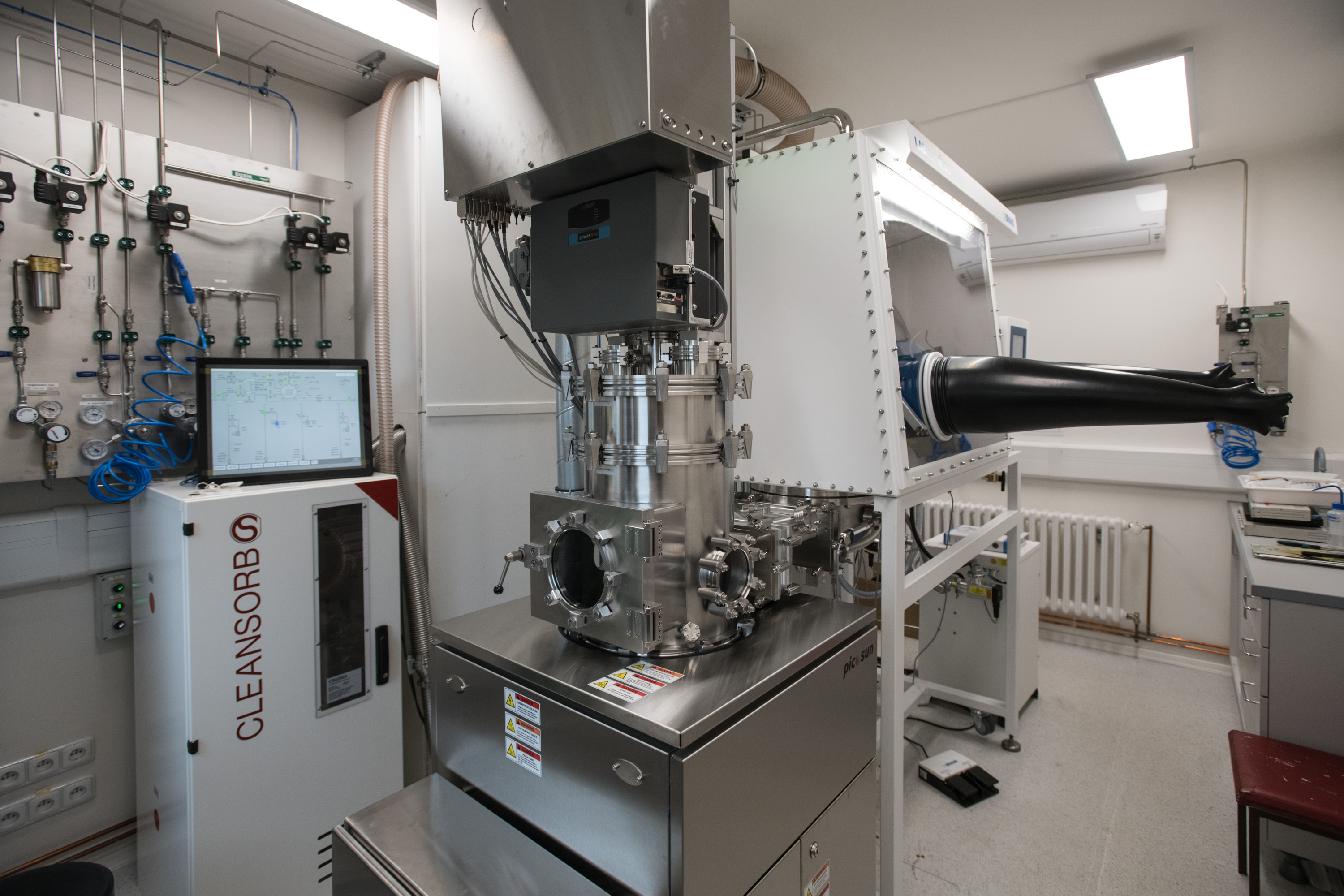
Atomic layer deposition system

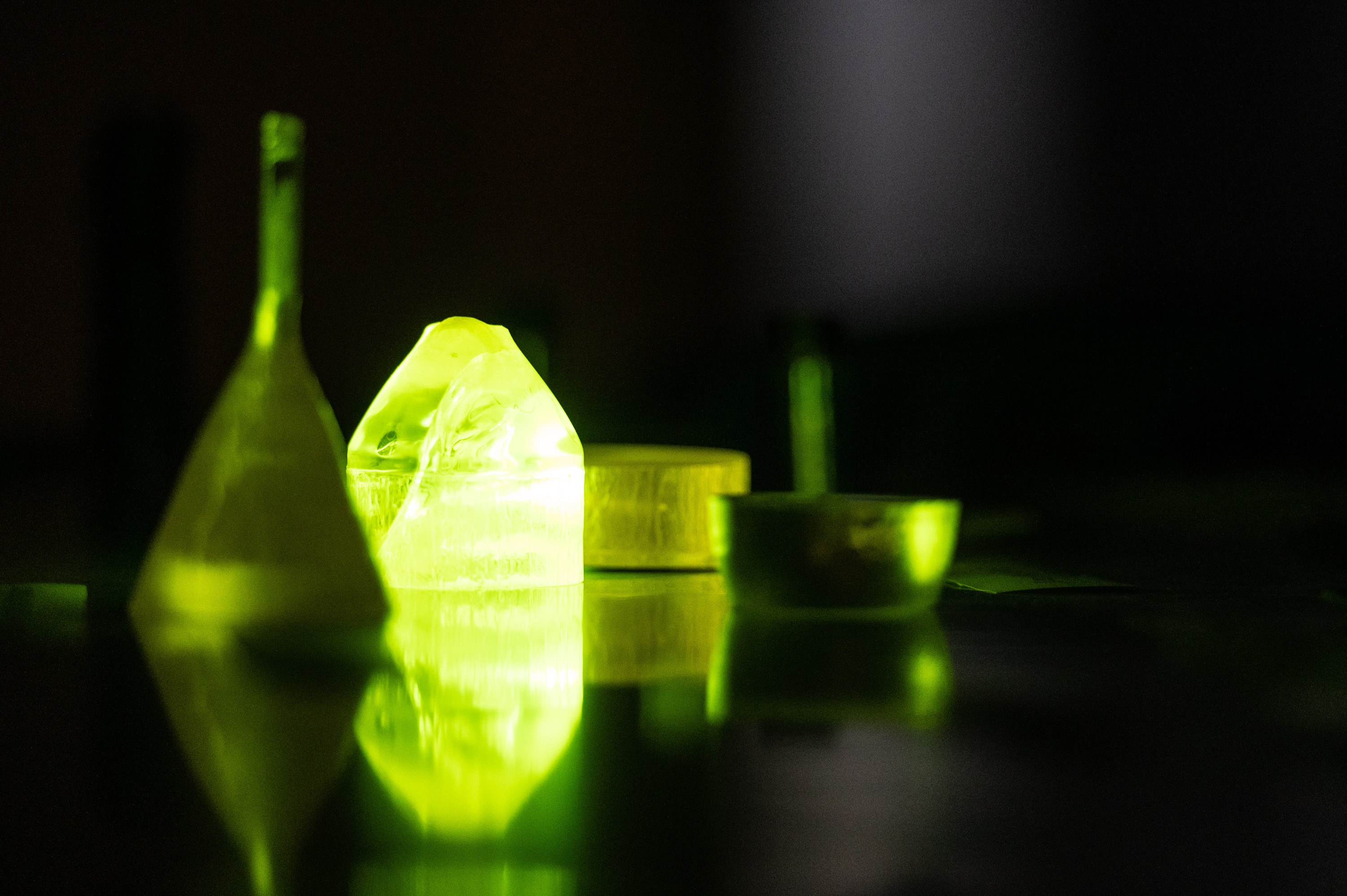
Scintillation crystals in Department of Optical Materials

=== Division of Optics ===
The Division of Optics has four departments located in the Slovanka research complex: Department of Optical and Biophysical Systems, Department of Low Temperature Plasma, Department of Analysis of Functional Materials and Department of Optical and Mechanical Workshops.

The fifth department is the Joint Laboratory of Optics, which FZU shares with Palacký University in Olomouc (central Moravia) and is also located there.

The division focuses on the investigation of optical radiation properties as well as research on optical materials and structures (including doped oxides and their surfaces, multilayer systems and nanostructured ceramics and crystals). In the field of classical optics, the problems of interferometry, holography, fractal optics, coherence and statistical behaviour of light beams are addressed.

In addition, they are involved in the development of applications for scientific and medical use, including X-ray optics for synchrotron radiation.

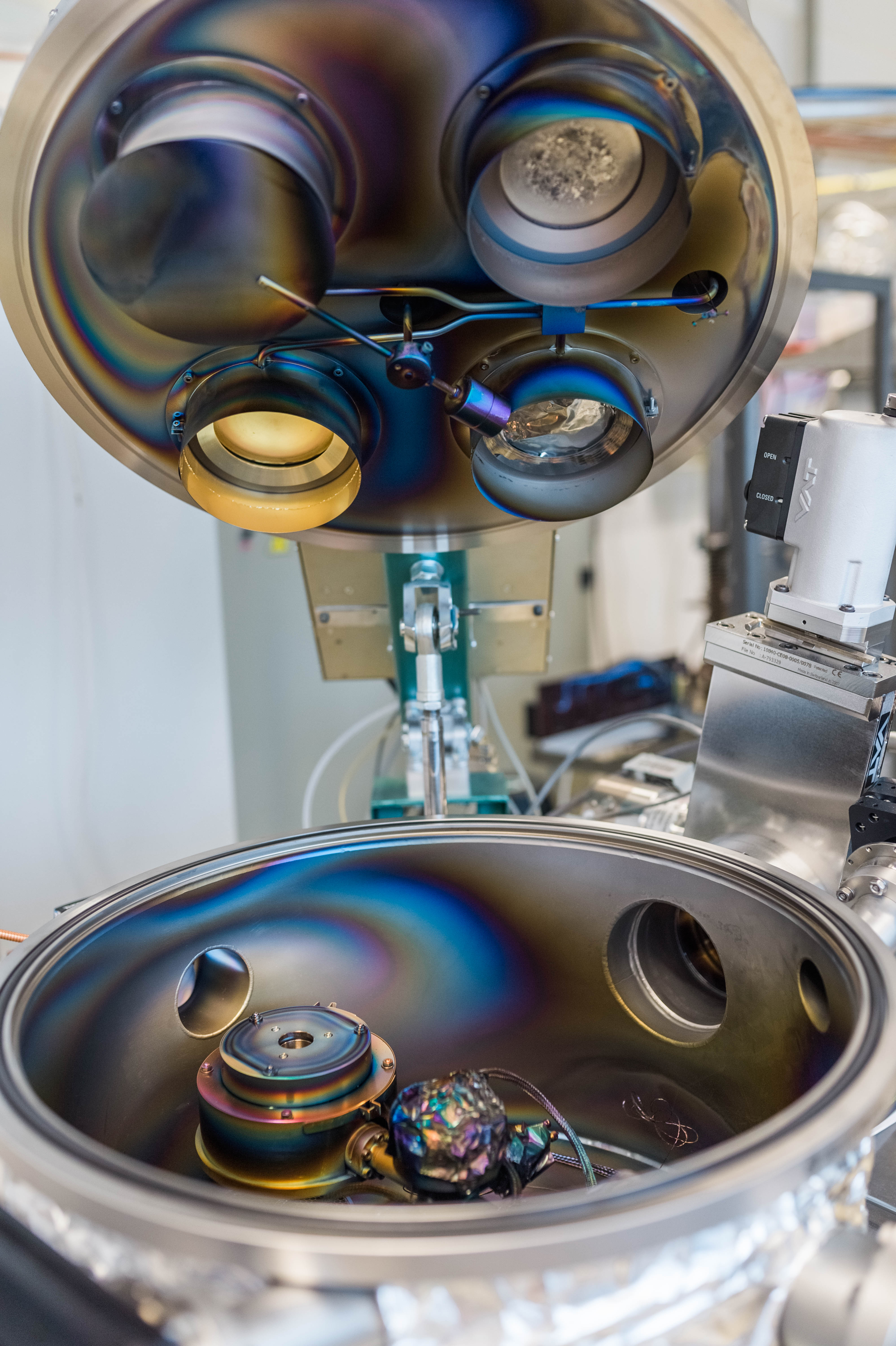
Magnetron sputtering chamber

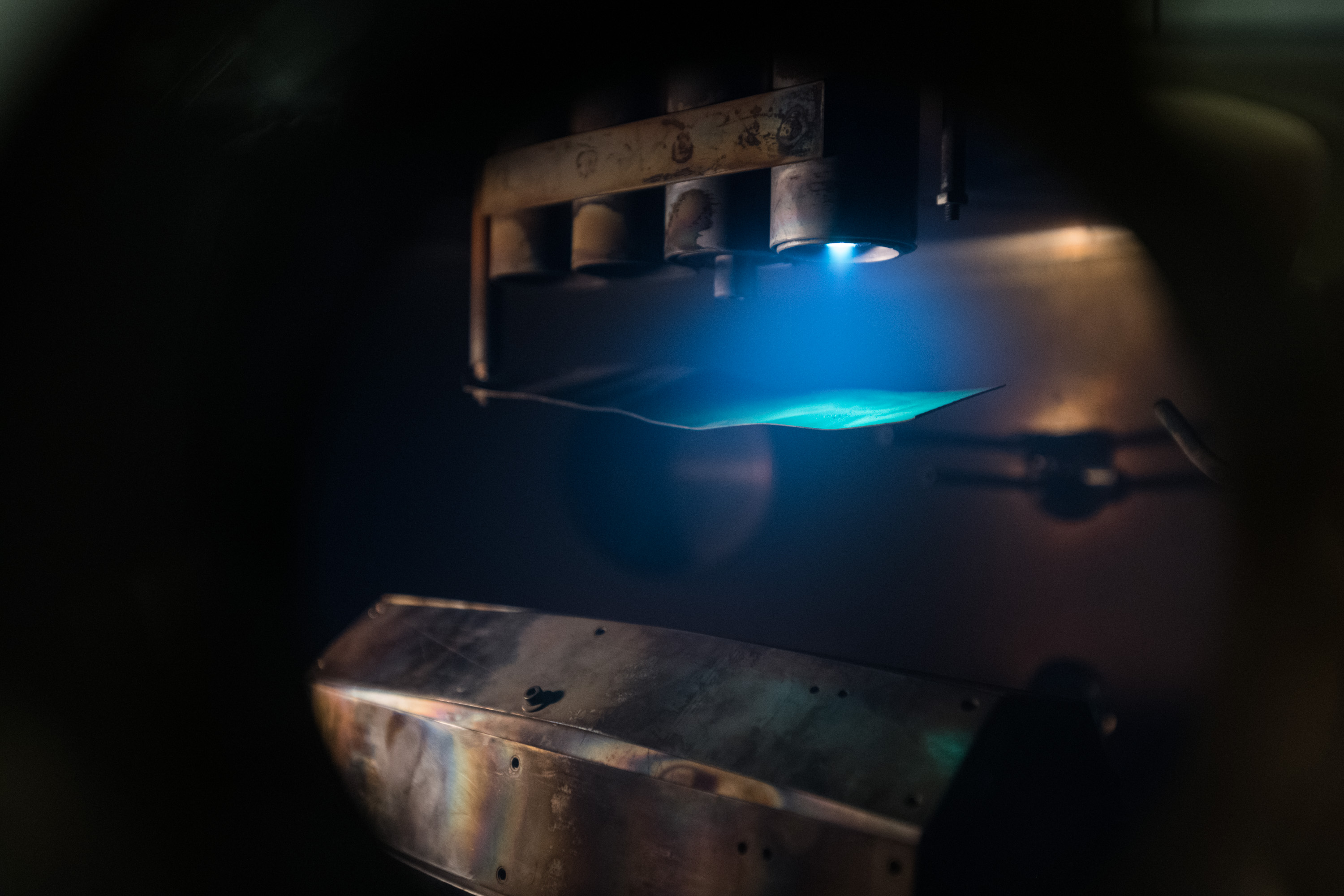
Linear plasma system with a series of hollow cathodes for rapid reactive thin film deposition

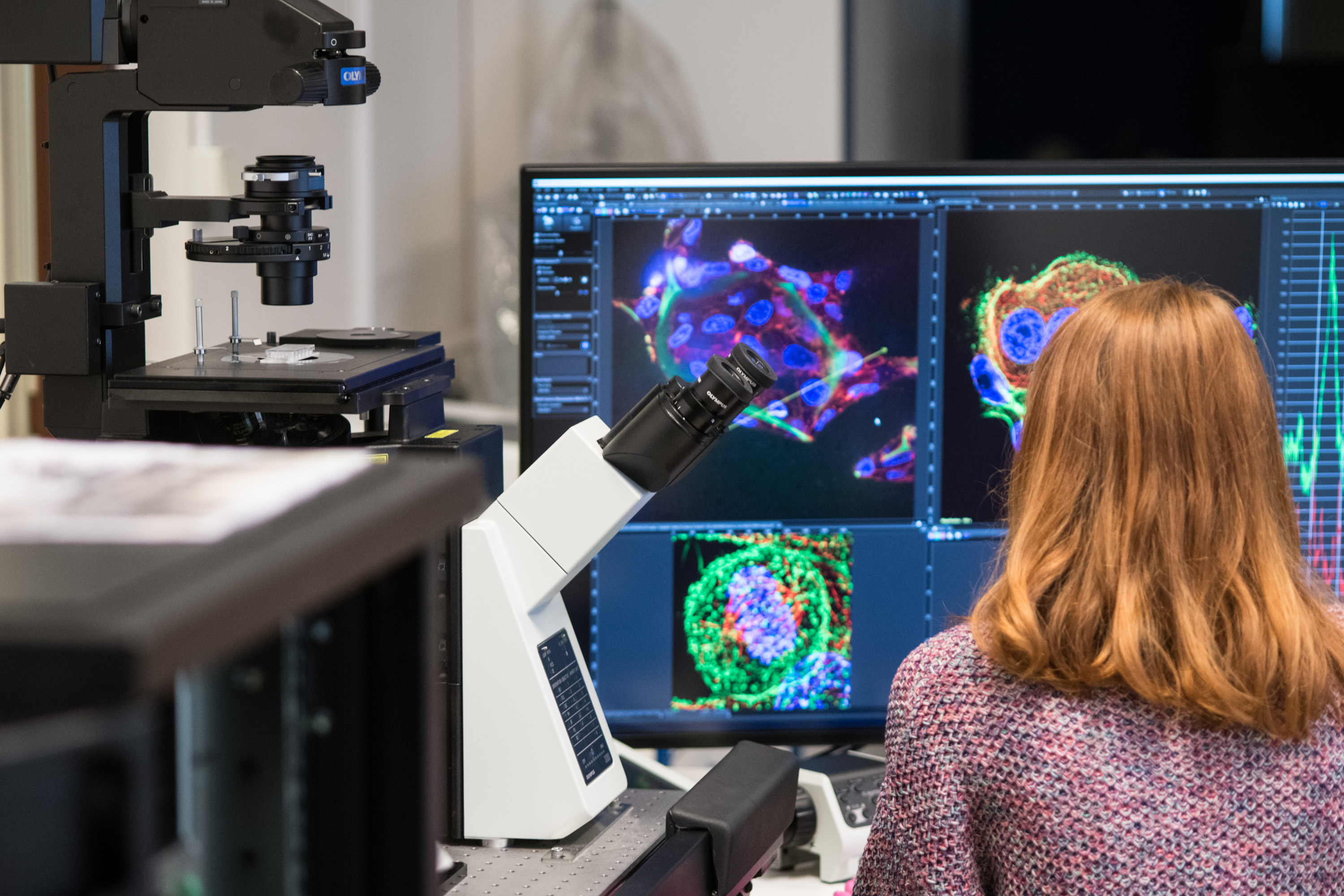
Researcher working with the Olympus IXplore SpinSR10 spinning disk confocal super-resolution microscope

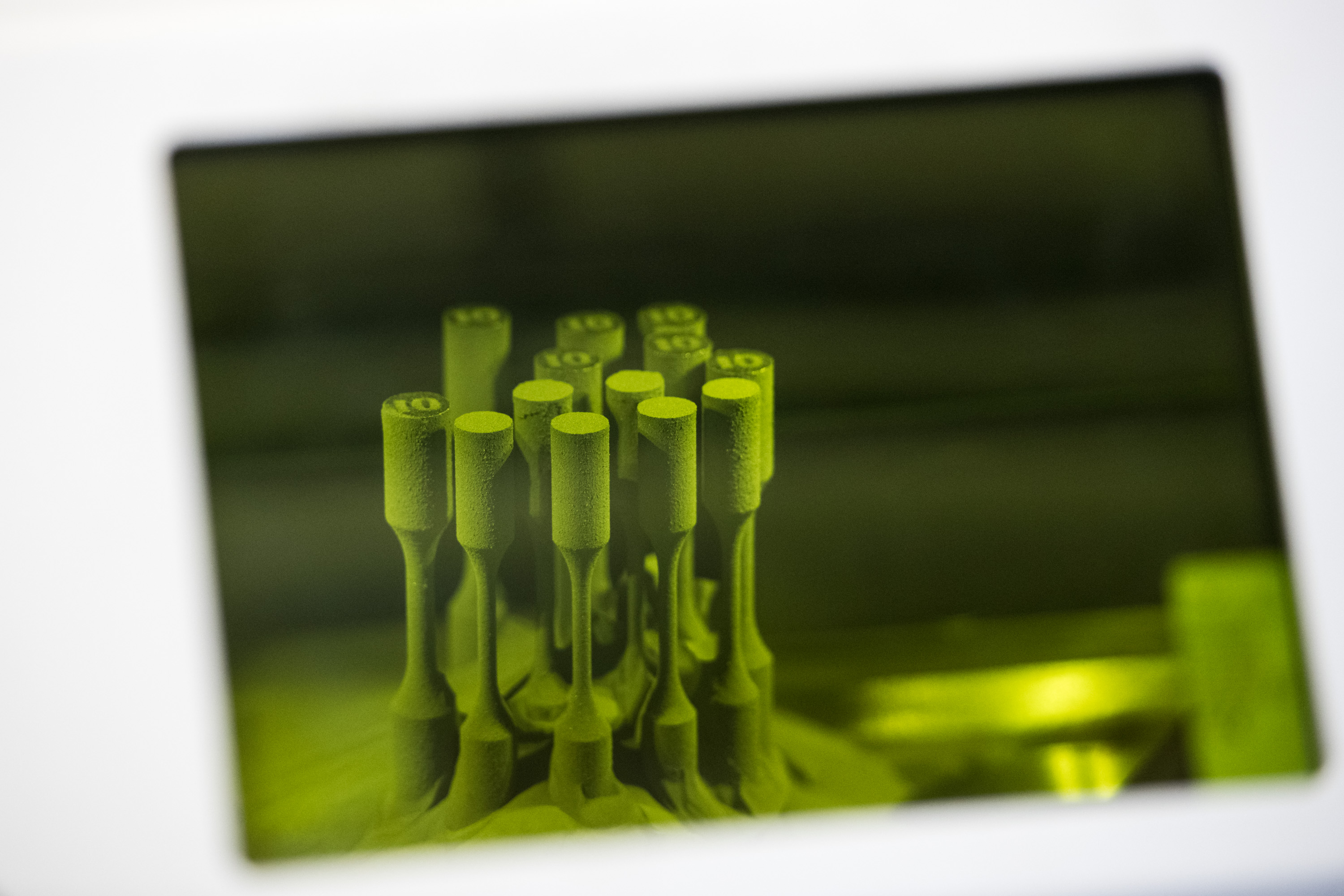
Metal 3D printer utilizing the selective laser melting (SLM) technology. View of the printing chamber with printing in progress.

=== Division of High Power Lasers – HiLASE Centre ===
Division of High Power Lasers – HiLASE Centre has 7 departments in total: at the research complex in the northern part of Prague are located the Radiation and Chemical Physics Department (PALS Research Centre operated jointly with the Institute of Plasma Physics of the CAS) and a part of the PALS Technical Support Department. Five other departments are located in the HiLASE Centre building in Dolní Břežany: the Department of Advanced Laser Development, the Department of Industrial Laser Applications, the Department of Scientific Laser Applications, the Engineering and Technical Support Department and the Project Management Department.

The division focuses its research on laser plasmas generated by pulsed power lasers emitting in the infrared, visible and soft X-ray region.

The division researchers are also involved in the development of lasers such as the kilowatt-class continuous supersonic chemical oxygen-iodine laser (COIL) in collaboration with the Laser Science & Technology Centre, India and diode-pumped high repetition rate lasers in the HiLASE project.

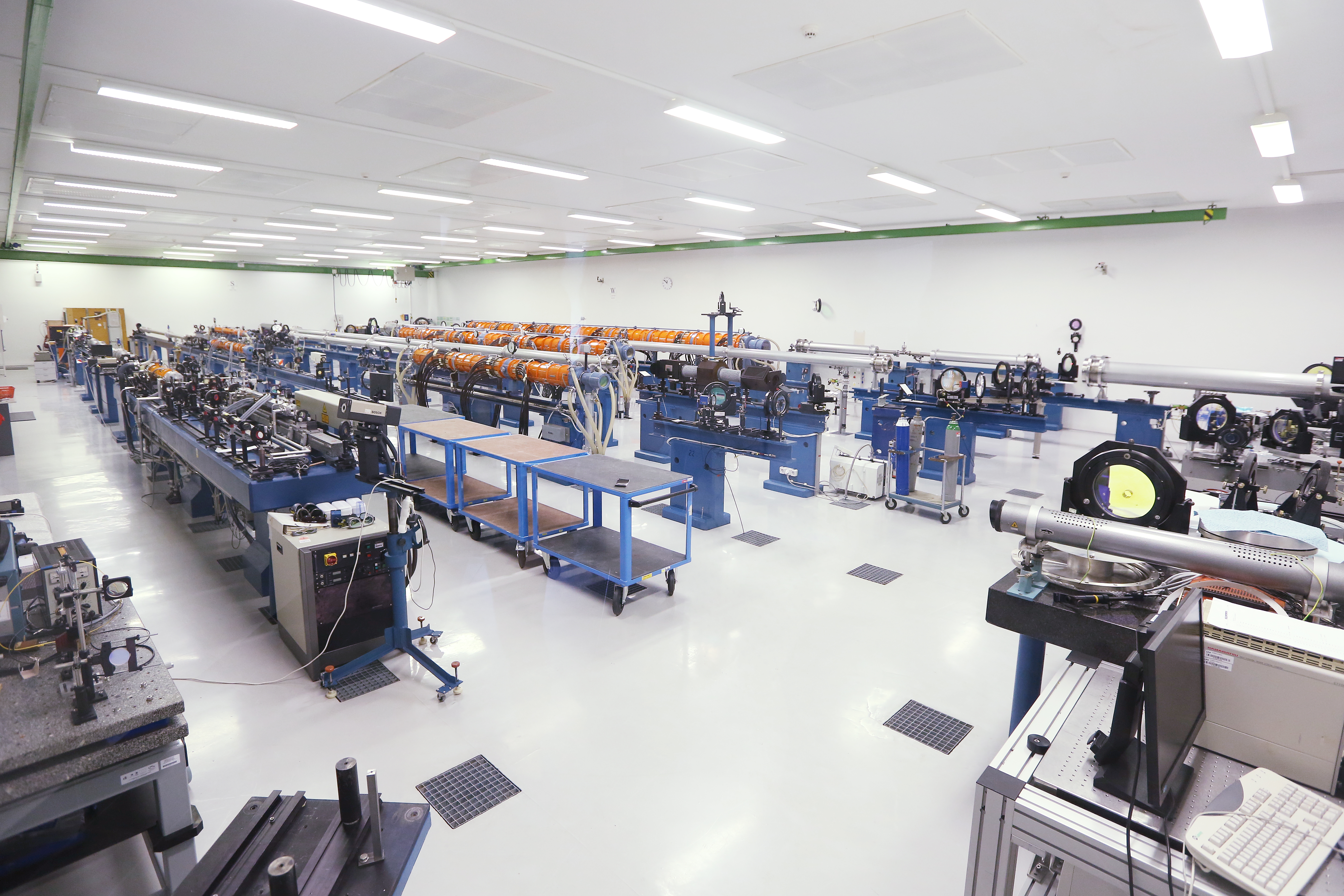
PALS centre

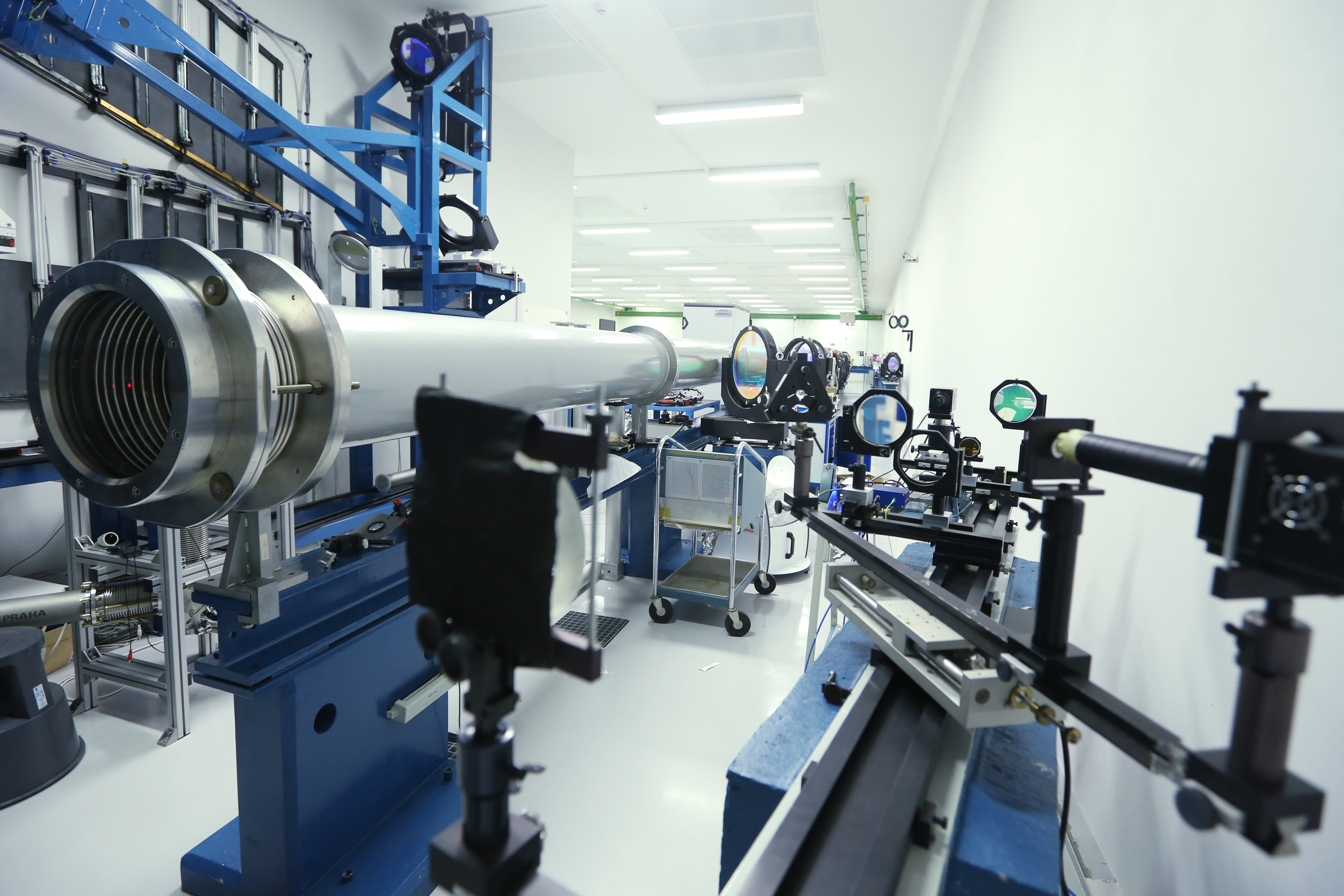
PALS - detail

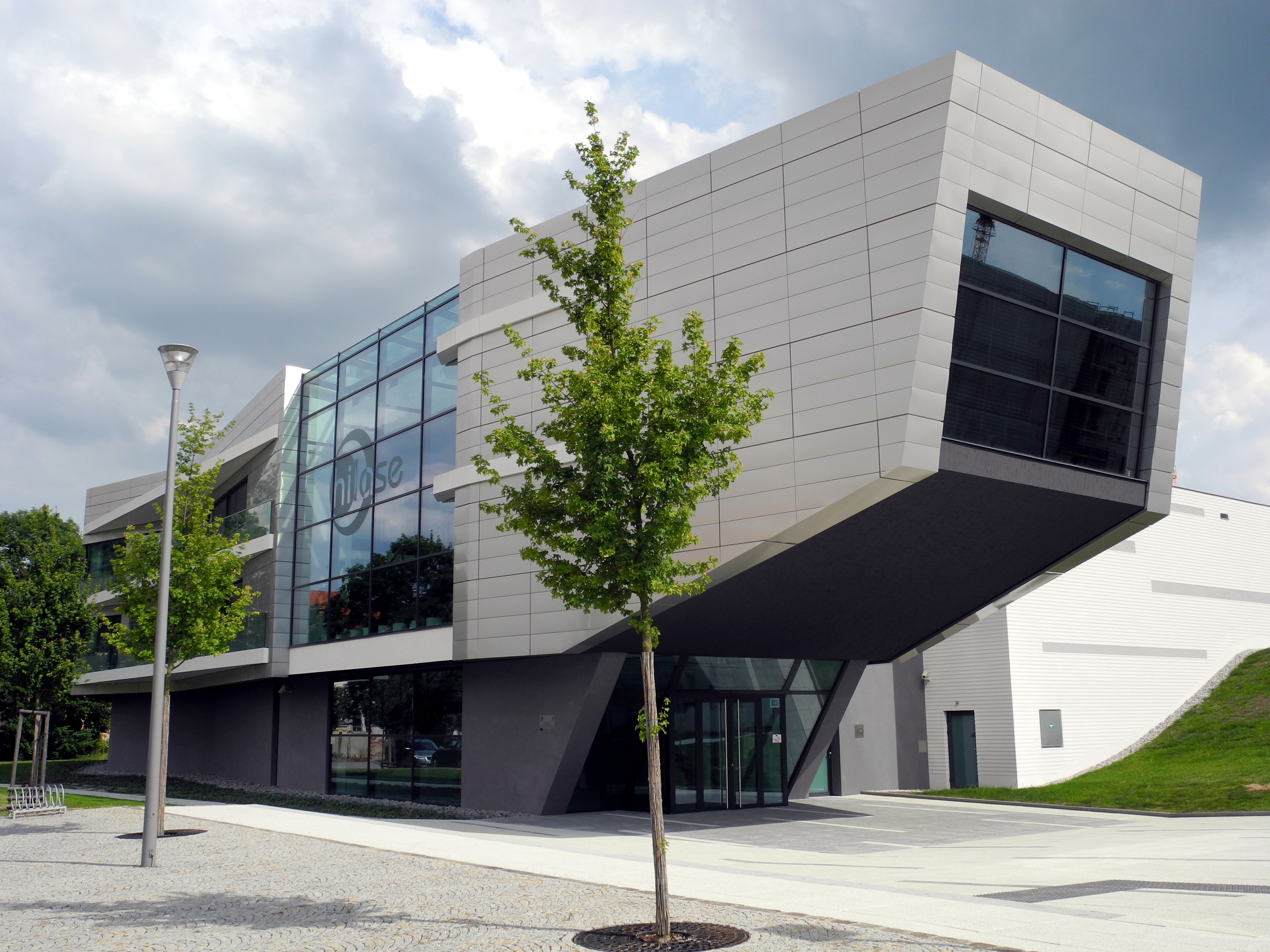
HiLASE Centre building in Dolní Břežany

=== ELI Beamlines Project Division ===
The division existed from 2012 to 2022 with headquarters in Dolní Břežany (Za Radnicí 835) near Prague. The main purpose of the division was the preparation and implementation of the ELI Beamlines laser centre, which is part of the European ELI ERIC consortium from January 2023.

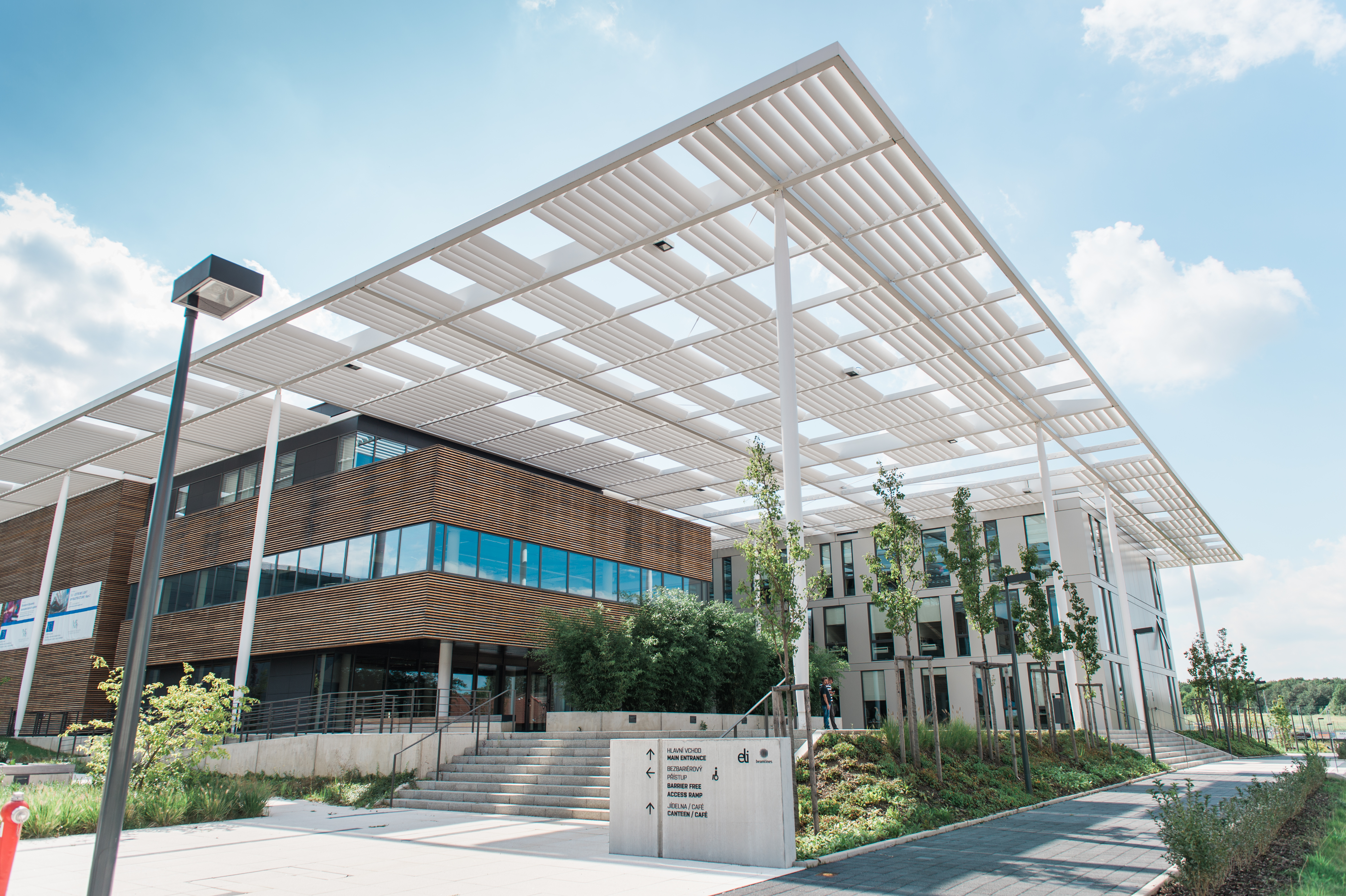
ELI Beamlines headquarters in Dolní Břežany

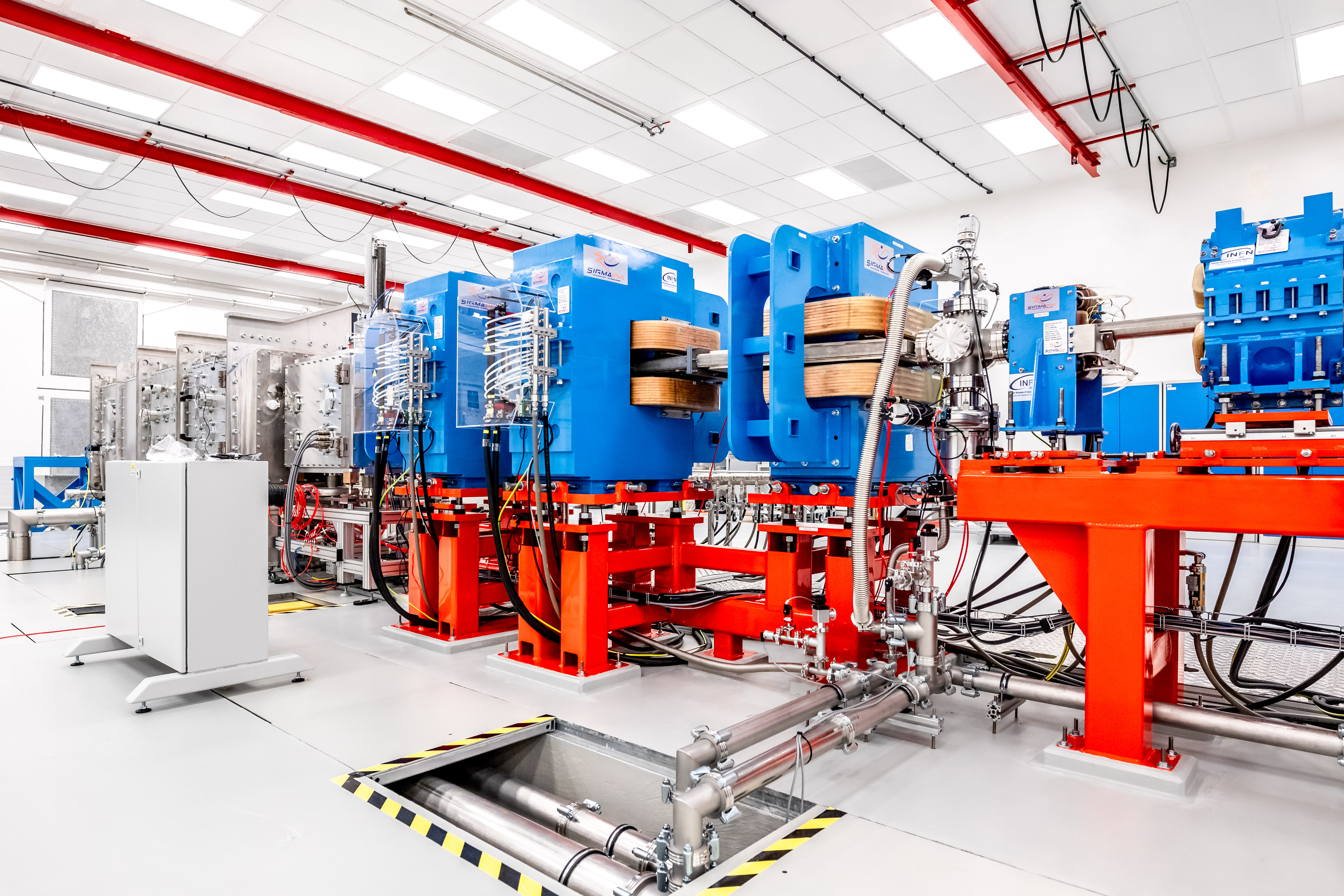
Experimental setup ELIMAIA

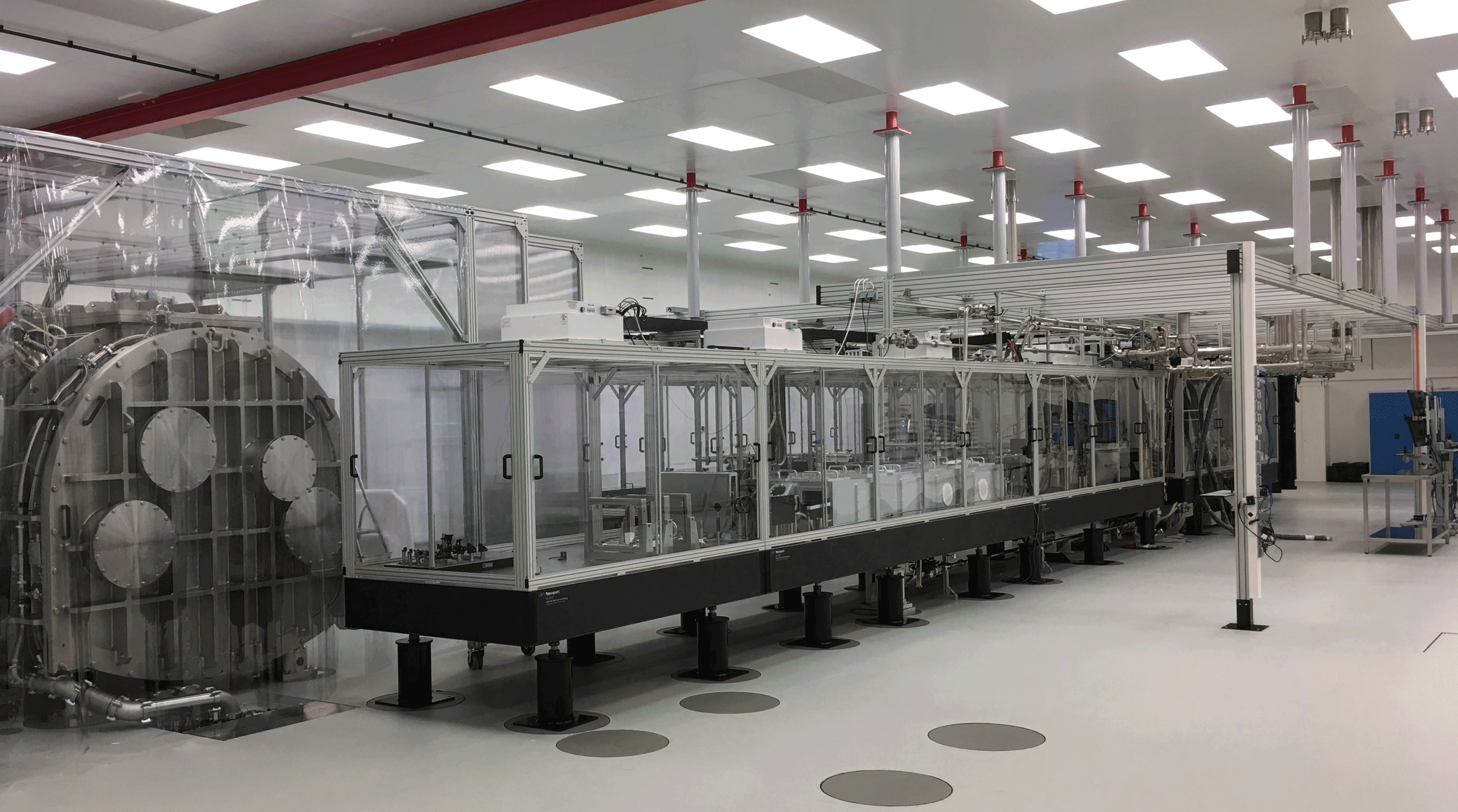
Laser system L3 HAPLS

== Dvořák lecture ==
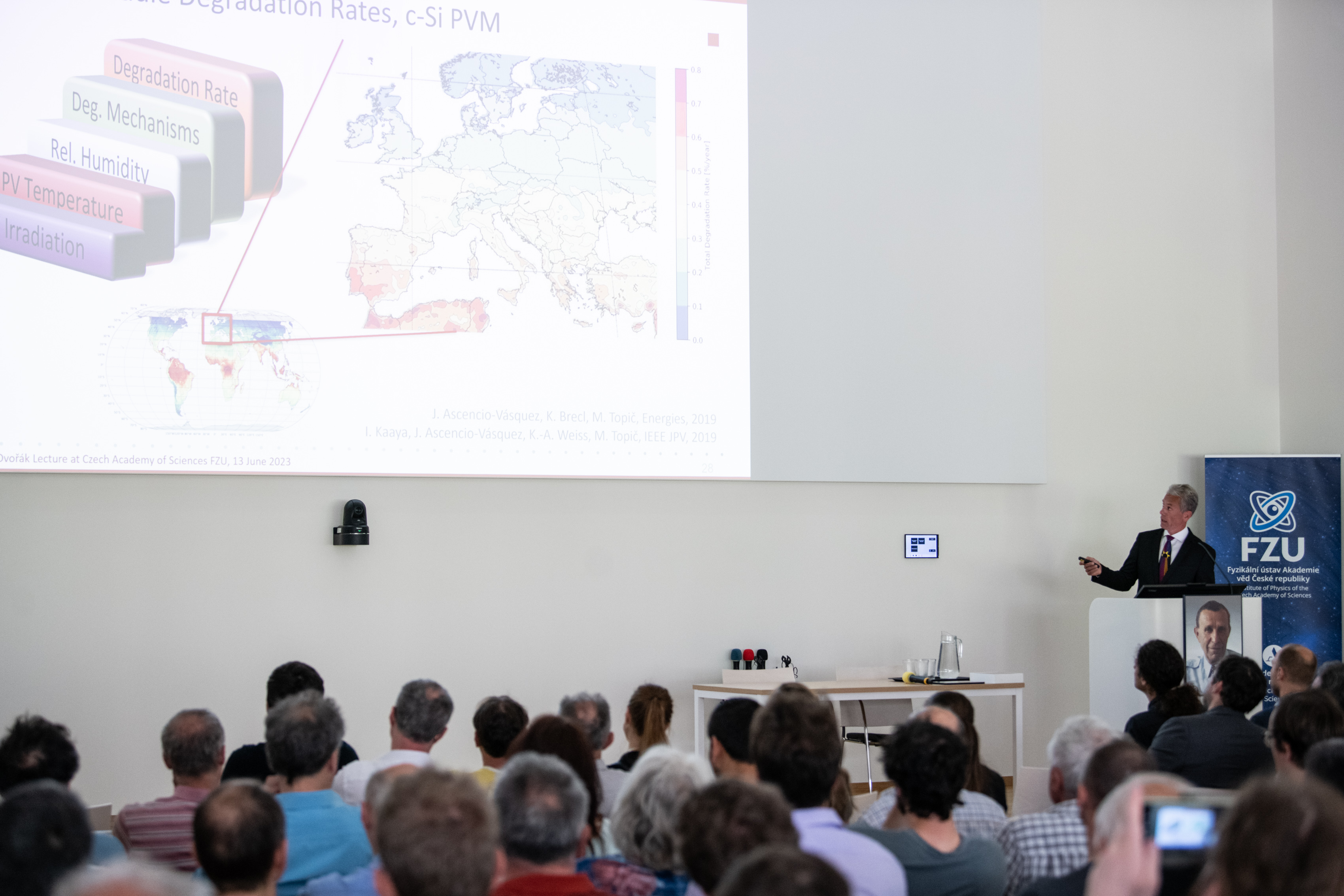
Prof. Topic in FZU at 13th Dvořák Lecture

Since 2009, the Institute of Physics has been organizing the Dvořák Lectures (Dvořákovy přednášky), which are held once a year and the lecturer is an internationally recognized authority in one of the fields of physics. The lecture is named after Vladimír Dvořák, a physicist in the field of solid state physics and also the director of FZU in 1993–2001. Among the speakers were Yoshihiro Ishibashi, Anton Zeilinger, Dieter Vollhardt, Allan H. MacDonald, Peter Jenni, Orazio Svelto, Janos Hajdu, Marco Cavaglià, Paul Lecoq, Shaoyi Jiang, Ramamoorthy Ramesh, Jorge J. Rocca, Marko Topic.

== Outreach activities ==
FZU participates in a number of activities popularizing research among the public, for example through lectures, excursions, workshops for students, etc. The biggest events include the Science Fair (Veletrh vědy), the Academy Week (Open Days) and the European Researchers' Night. FZU also participates in ScienceFest (VědaFest), Take Back Your Streets (Zažít město jinak) and many other events in the Czech Republic.

The Institute of Physics has a number of interesting tools that help in explaining advanced physics topics - for example, a cloud chamber, a laser maze, a model of a superconducting (maglev) train, or a photovoltaic tent.

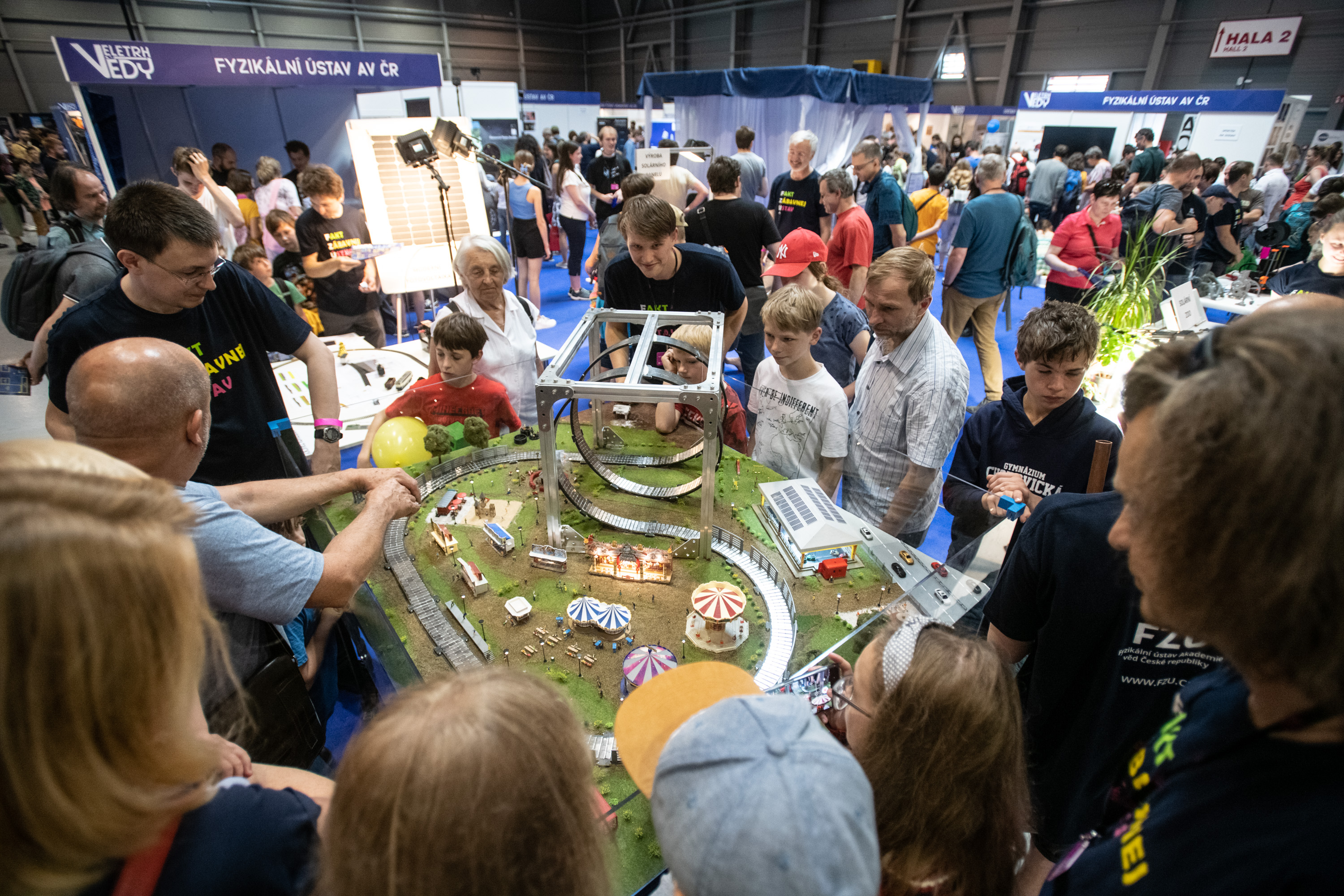
Science Fair visitors around superconducting model

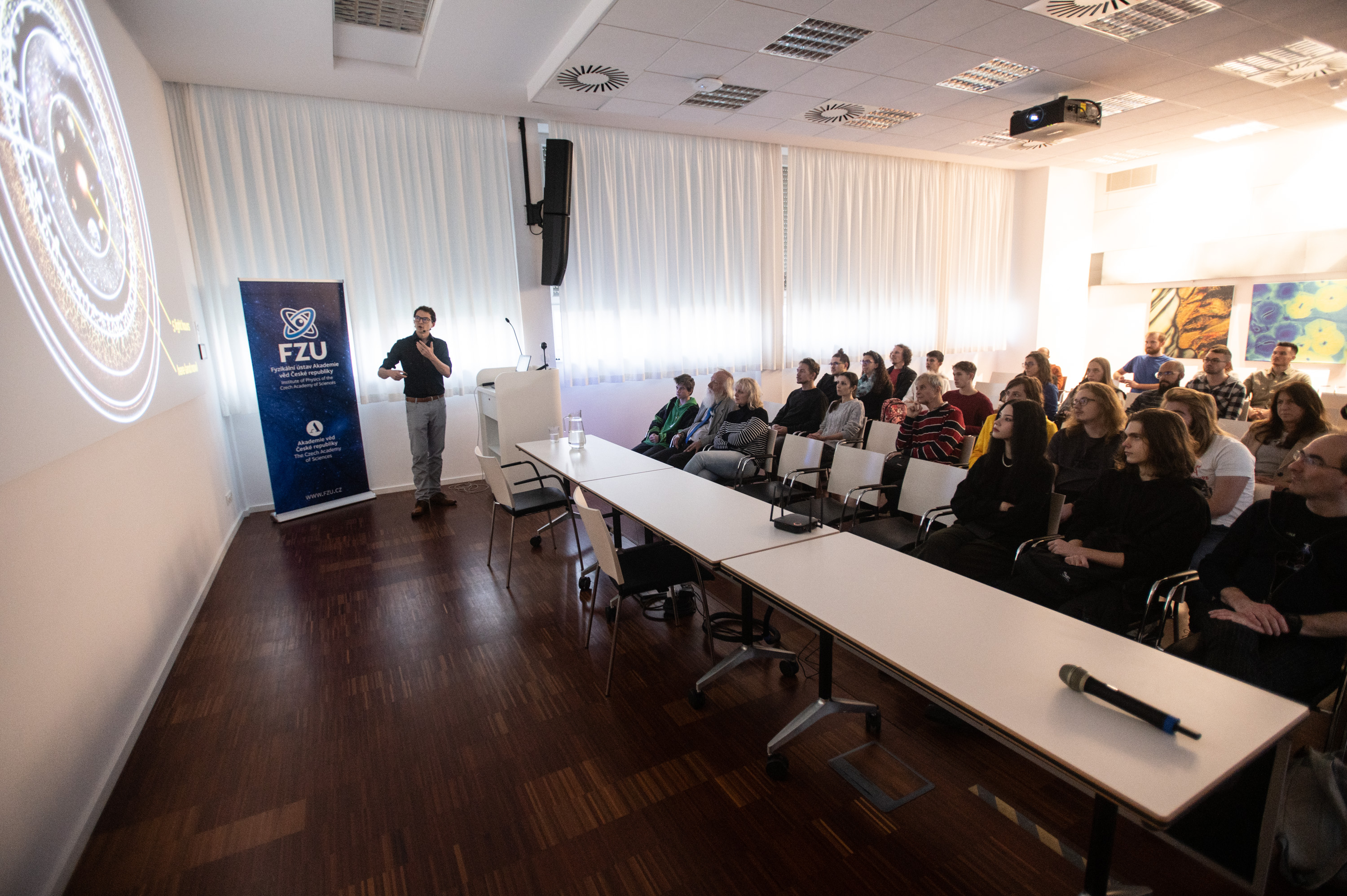
Public talk in FZU

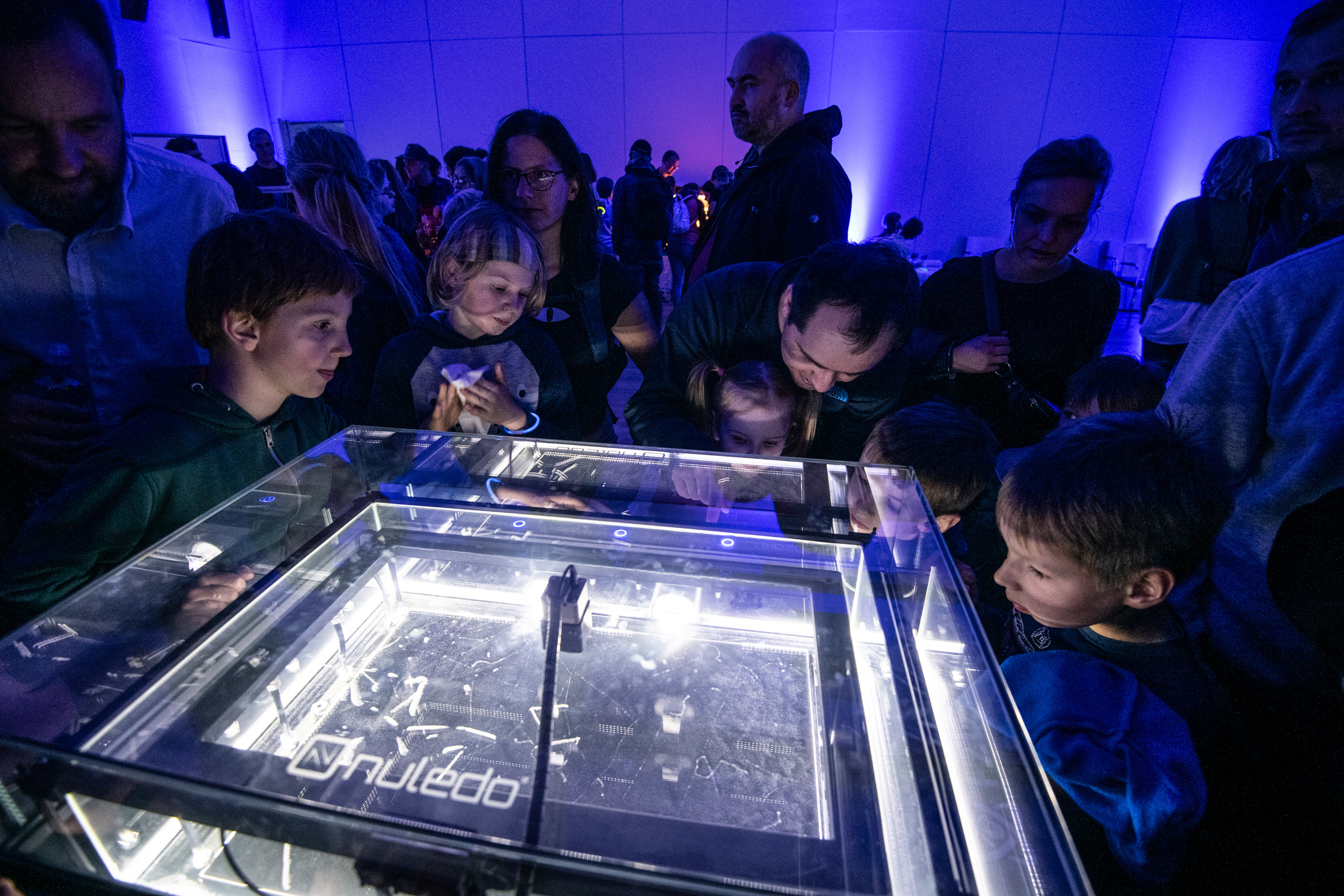
Visitors around cloud chamber during Researchers' Night

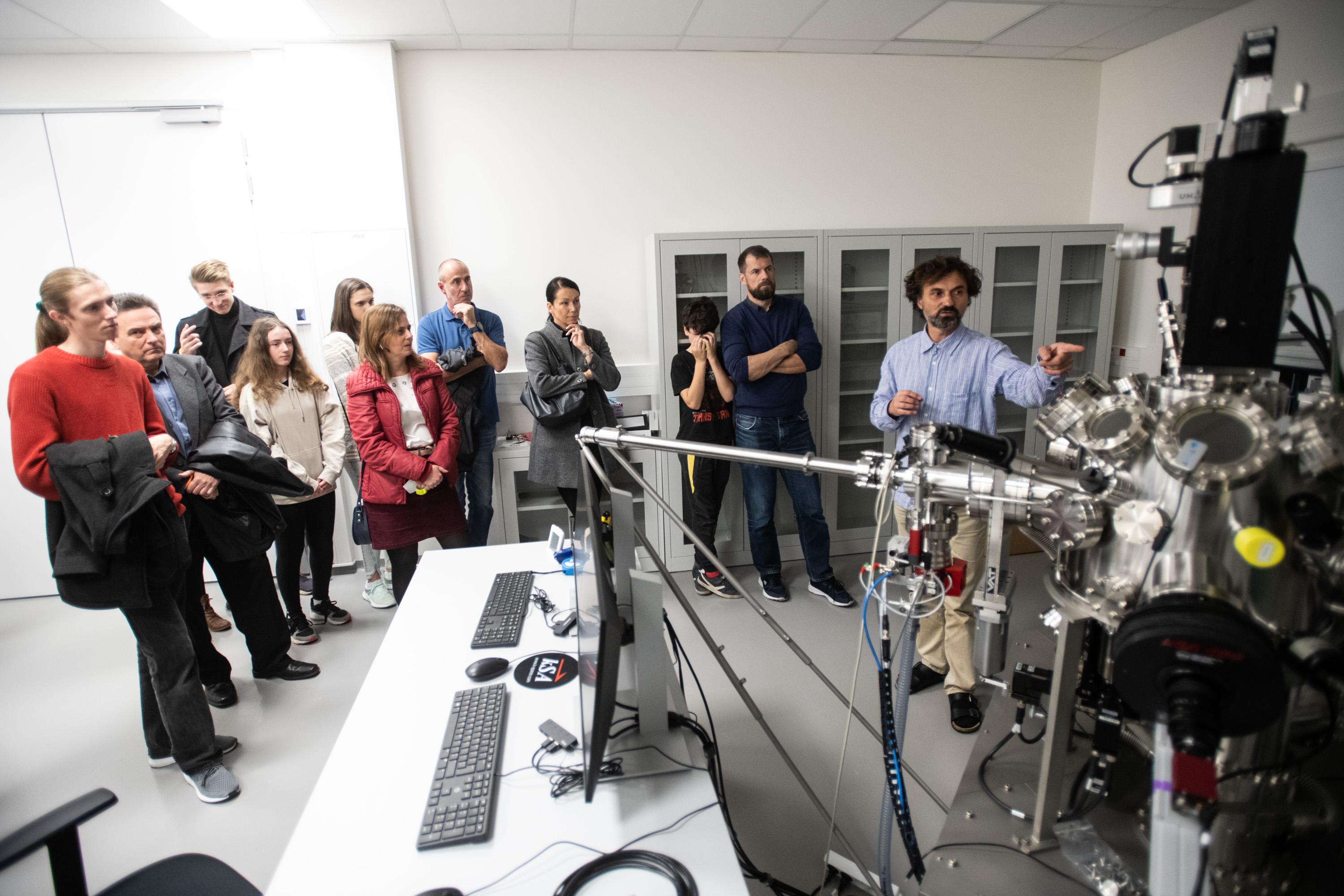
Excursion for public in FZU laboratory

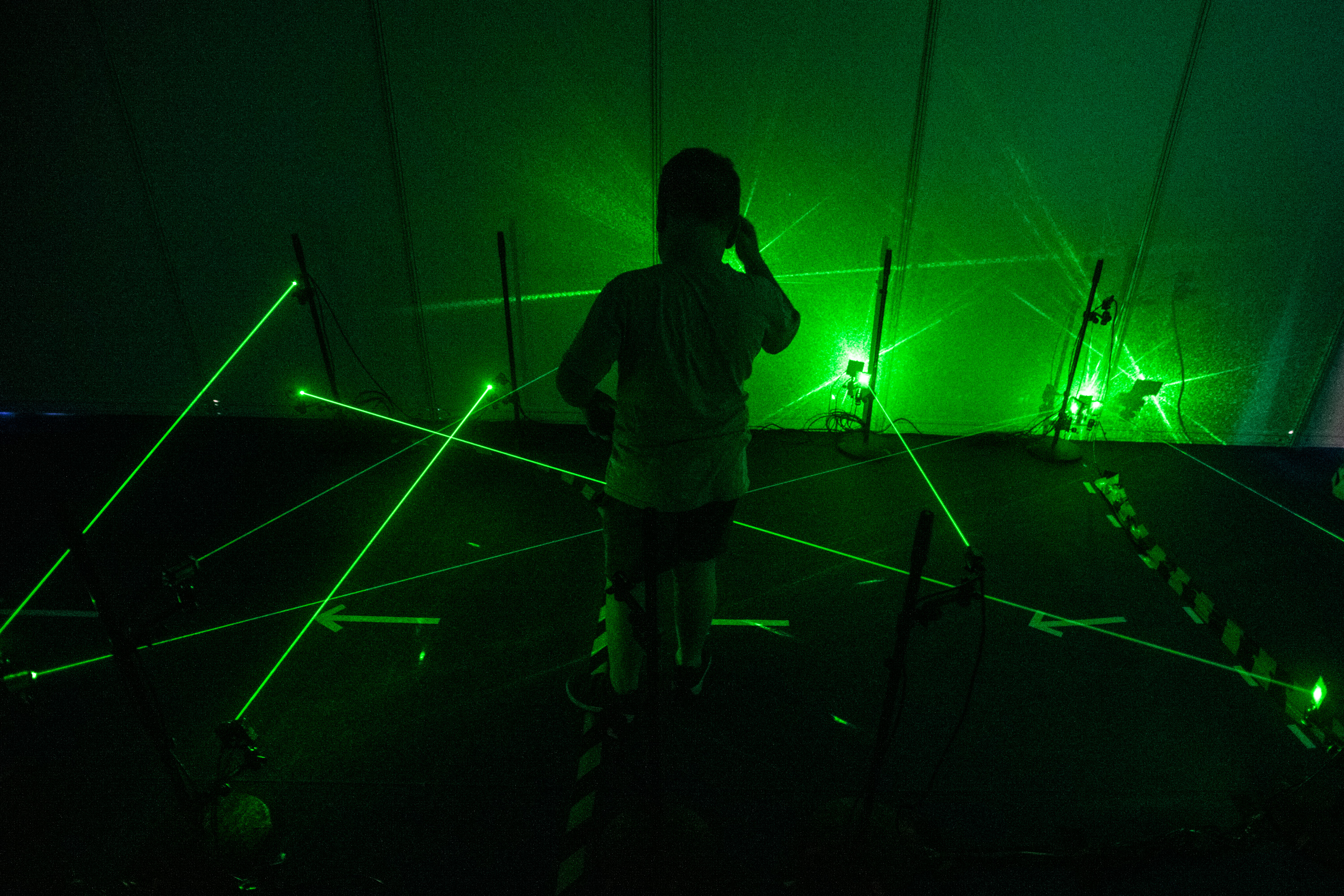
Laser maze

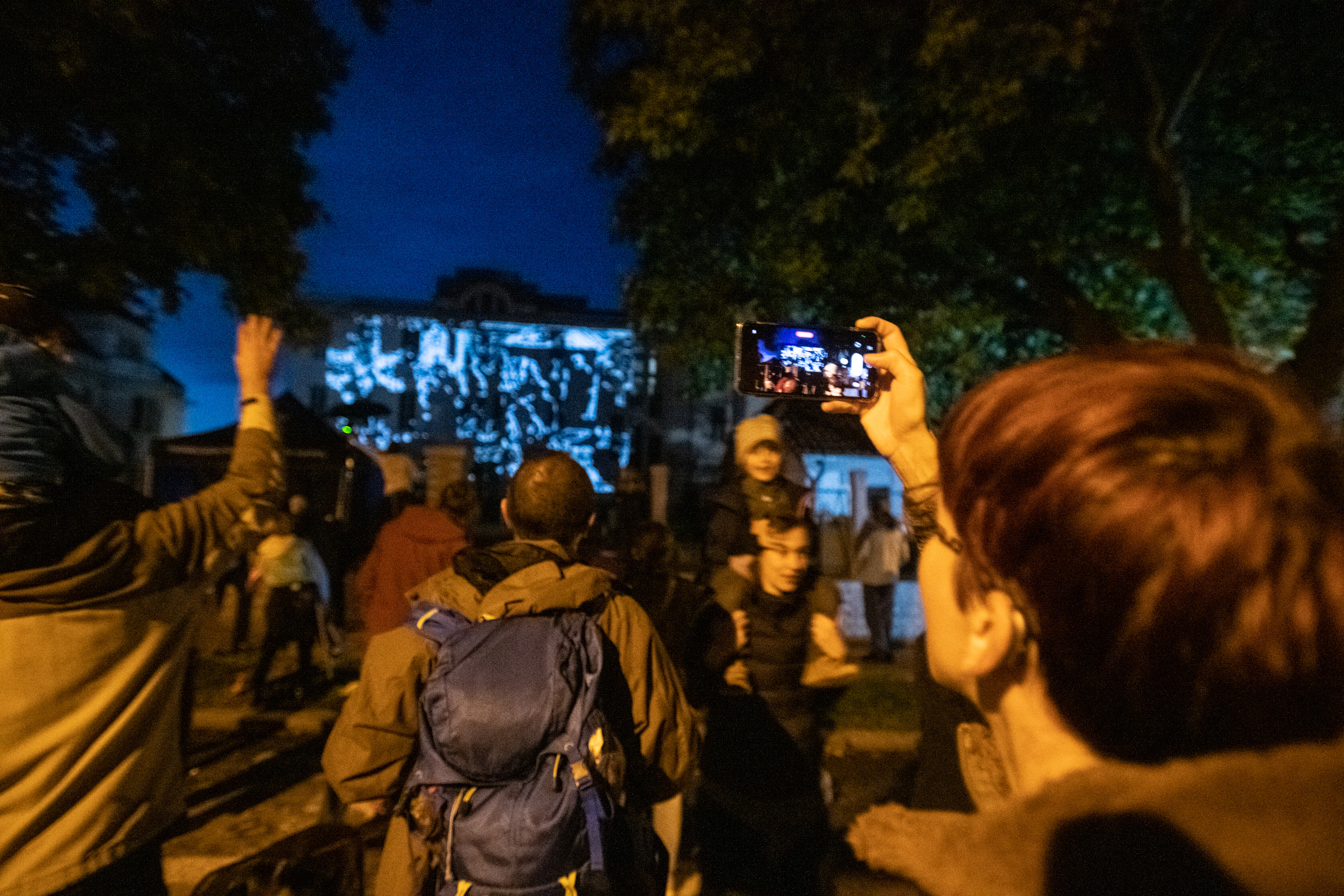
Lasermapping on FZU building during street festival
