= Paul Lecoq =

Physicist

Paul Lecoq is a senior physicist at the European Organization for Nuclear Research (CERN), Geneva, Switzerland. He was named Fellow of the Institute of Electrical and Electronics Engineers (IEEE) in 2015 for "contributions to scintillator detectors for high-energy physics and medical imaging".
