= Hostouň (Kladno District) =

- Municipality
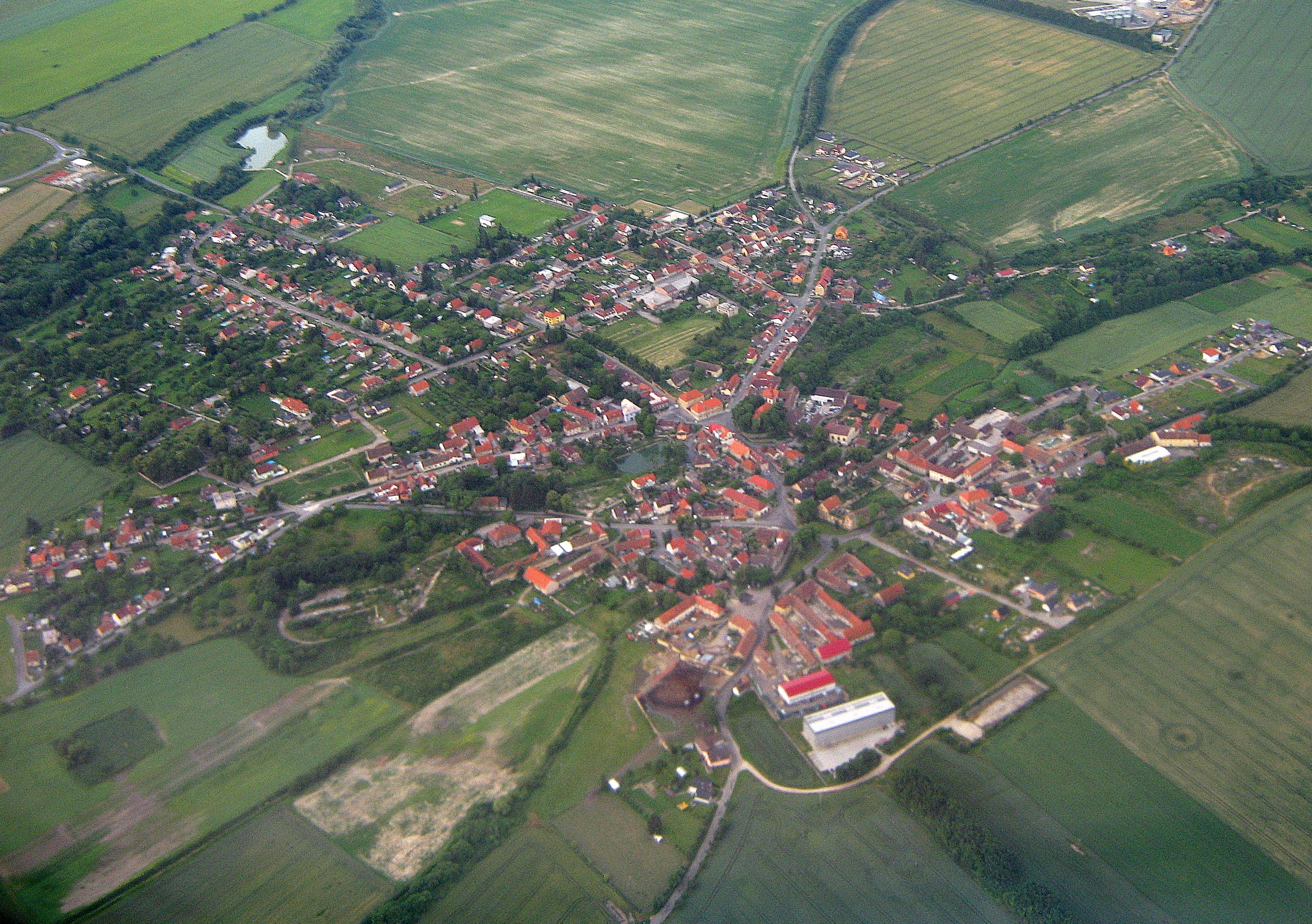
- Aerial view

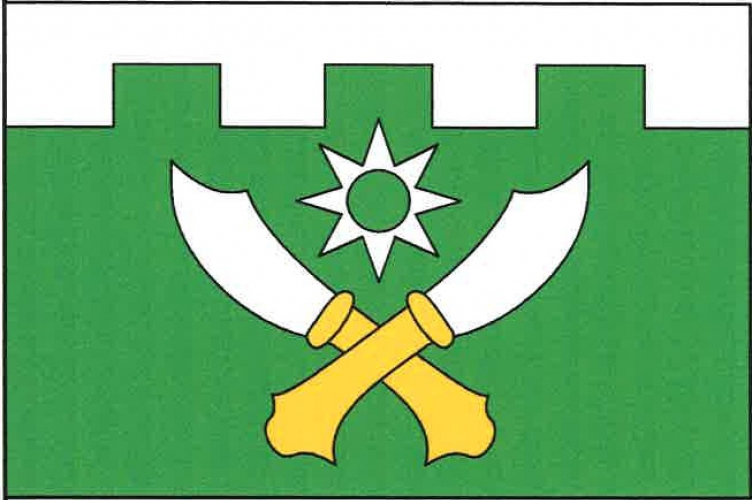
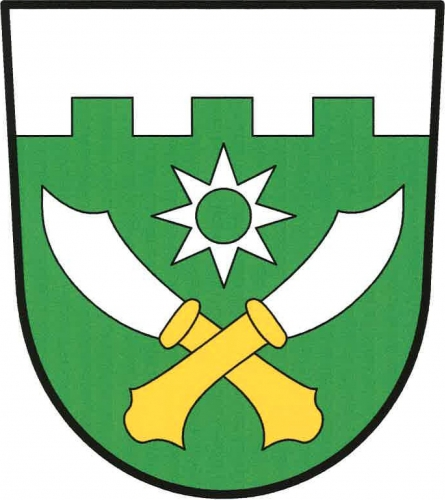
- Flag Coat of arms

- Location in the Czech Republic
- Coordinates: 50°6′52″N 14°12′5″E
- Country: Czech Republic
- Region: Central Bohemian
- District: Kladno
- First mentioned: 1294

Area
  - Total: 10.34 km^{2} (3.99 sq mi)
- Elevation: 341 m (1,119 ft)

Population (2026-01-01)
  - Total: 1,645
  - Density: 159.1/km^{2} (412.0/sq mi)
- Time zone: UTC+1 (CET)
  - Summer (DST): UTC+2 (CEST)
- Postal code: 273 53
- Website: www.hostounuprahy.cz

Hostouň (Czech pronunciation: [ˈɦostouɲ]) is a municipality and village in Kladno District in the Central Bohemian Region of the Czech Republic. It has about 1,600 inhabitants.

== Etymology ==
The name is derived from the personal name Hostoun, meaning "Hostoun's (court)".

== Geography ==
Hostouň is located about 6 kilometres (4 mi) southeast of Kladno and 9 km (6 mi) west of Prague. It lies in a flat agricultural landscape in the Prague Plateau.

== History ==
The first written mention of Hostouň is from 1294. There was a fortress called Šafránov. It used to be a wealthy village with a significant Jewish community.

== Demographics ==
Historical population

Year	Pop.	±%
1869	1,215	—
1880	1,286	+5.8%
1890	1,437	+11.7%
1900	1,350	−6.1%
1910	1,317	−2.4%

Year	Pop.	±%
1921	1,243	−5.6%
1930	1,352	+8.8%
1950	1,185	−12.4%
1961	1,177	−0.7%
1970	1,072	−8.9%

Year	Pop.	±%
1980	994	−7.3%
1991	948	−4.6%
2001	918	−3.2%
2011	1,049	+14.3%
2021	1,562	+48.9%

Source: Censuses

== Transport ==
The D6 motorway from Prague to Karlovy Vary runs through the municipality.

A railway runs through the municipality, however, the train stop named Hostouň u Prahy on the lines Prague–Středokluky and Hostivice–Noutonice is located in the territory of neighbouring Dobrovíz.

== Sights ==
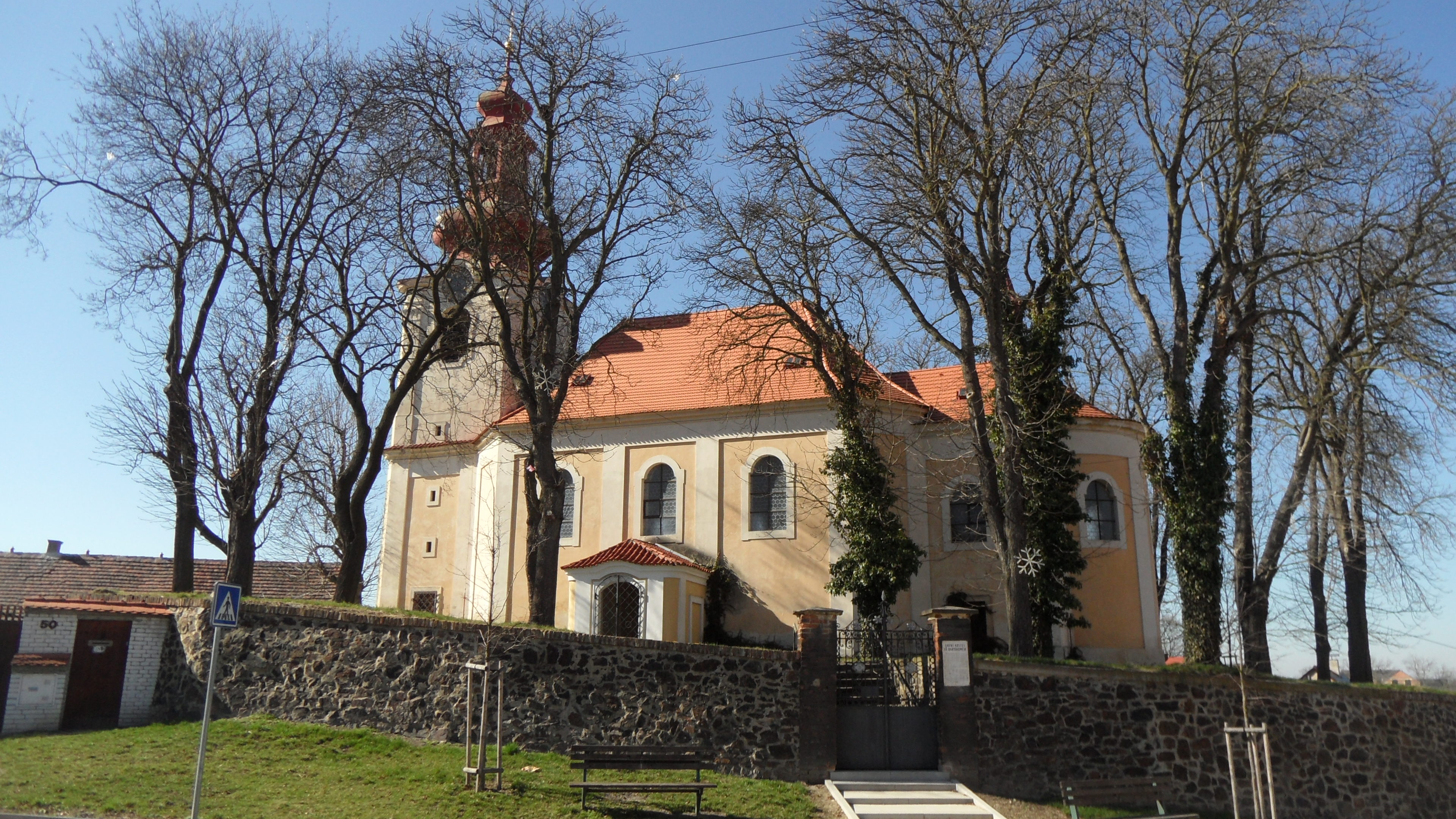
Church of Saint Bartholomew

The main landmark of Hostouň is the Church of Saint Bartholomew. It was originally a medieval Gothic church, first mentioned in 1352. It was rebuilt in the Baroque style and extended at the beginning of the 18th century. The tower was added in 1773.

In the municipality are two Jewish cemeteries. The Old Cemetery was founded in the 16th century and the New Cemetery was founded in the first half of the 18th century.
