= Dobrovíz =

- Municipality
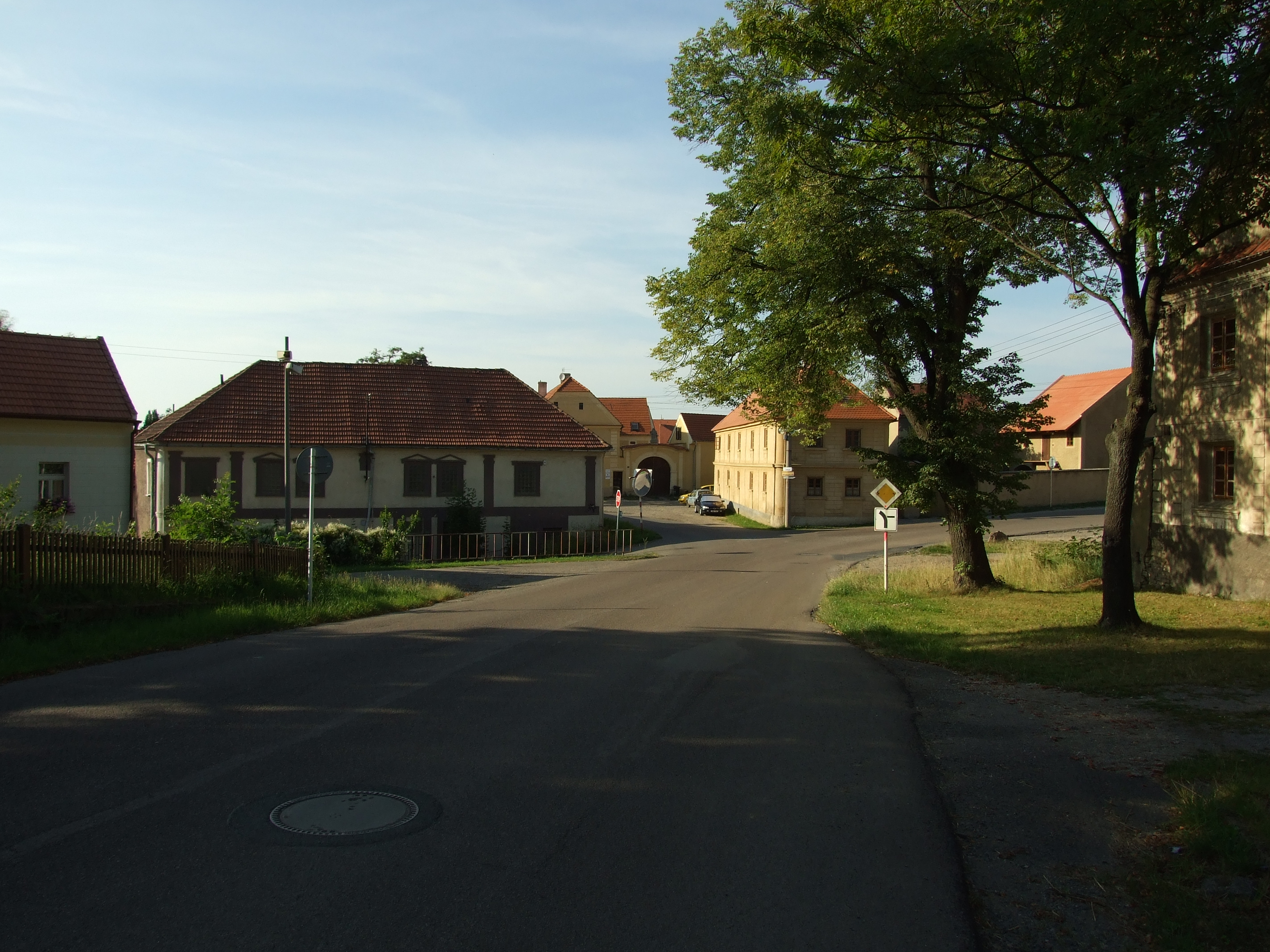
- Centre of Dobrovíz

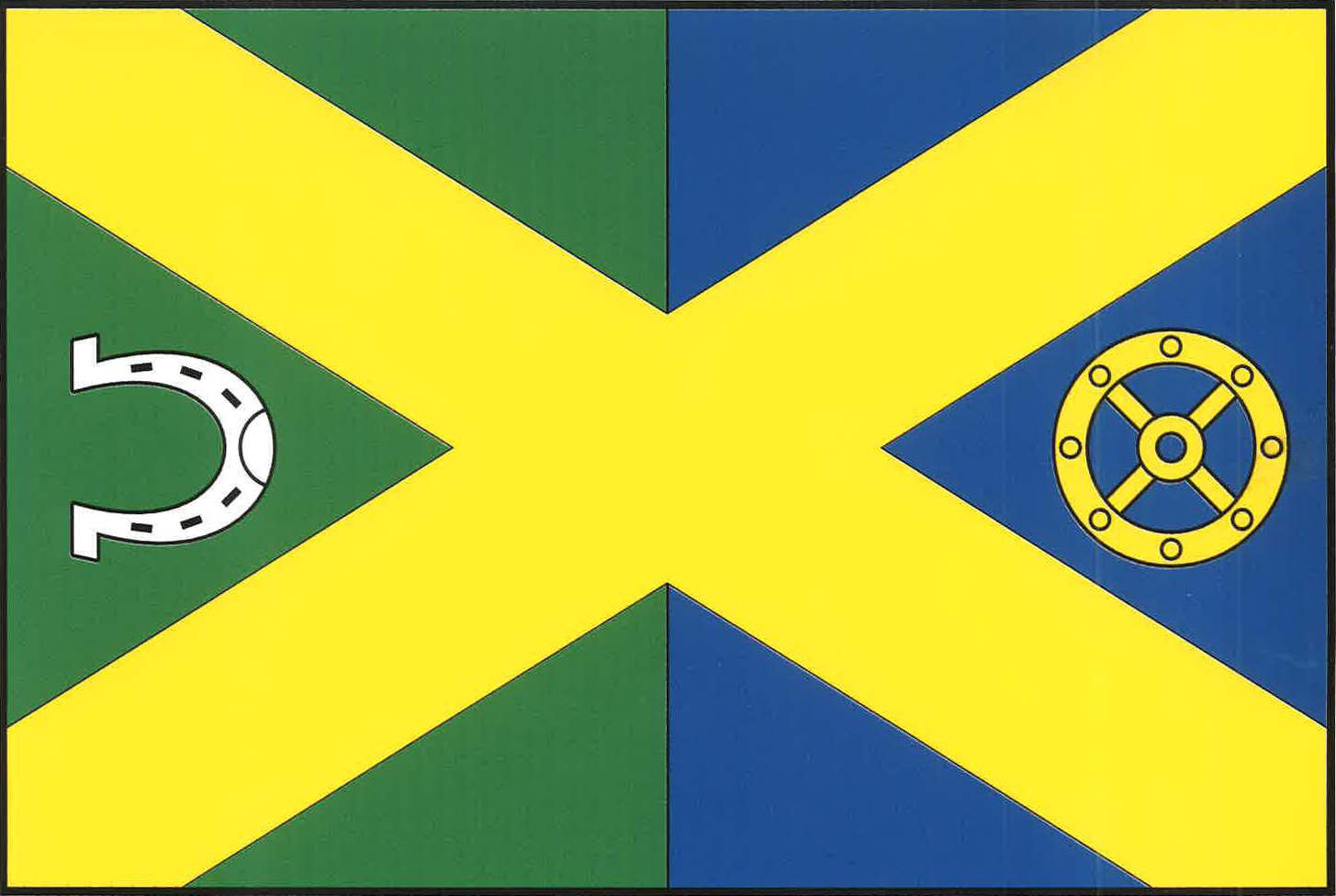
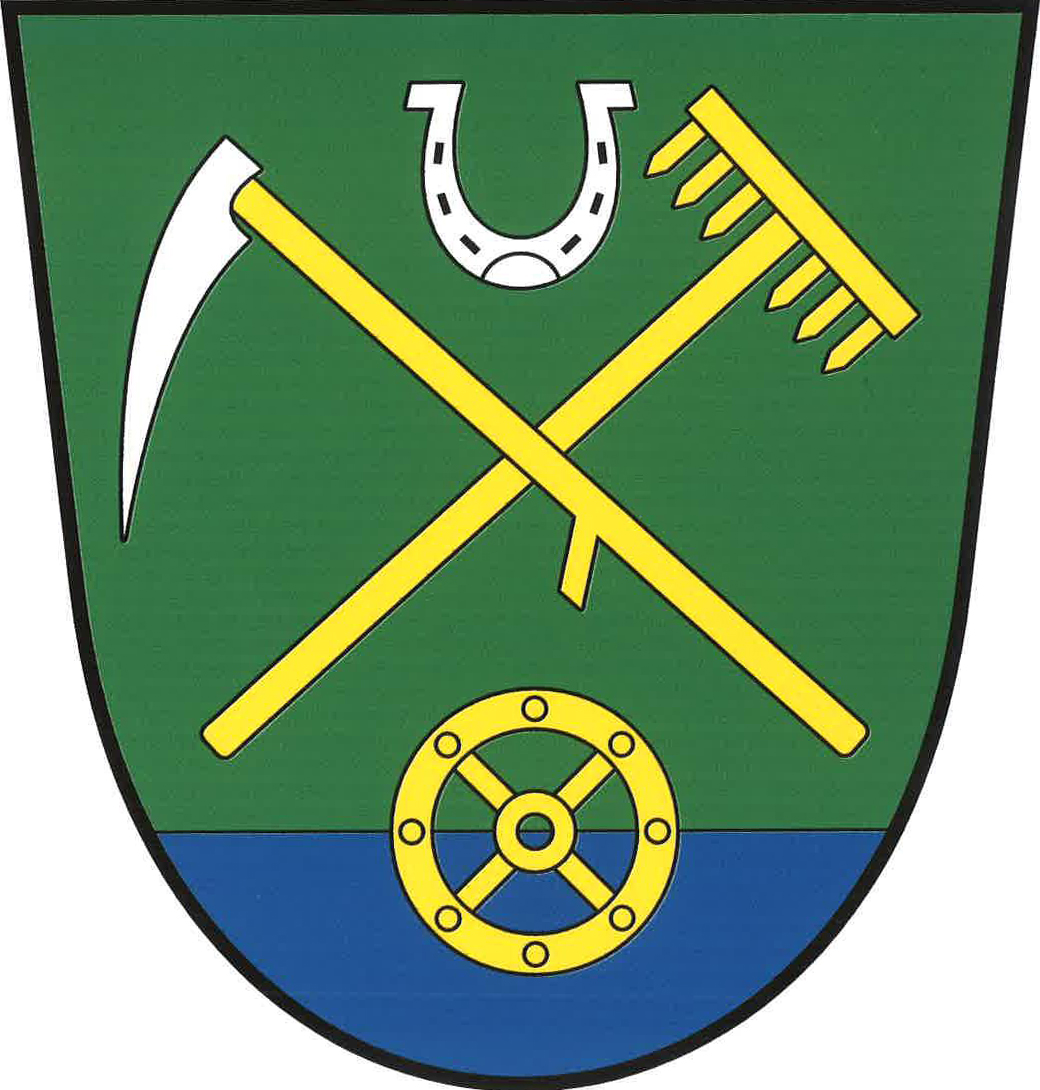
- Flag Coat of arms

- Location in the Czech Republic
- Coordinates: 50°6′47″N 14°13′4″E
- Country: Czech Republic
- Region: Central Bohemian
- District: Prague-West
- First mentioned: 1238

Area
  - Total: 5.97 km^{2} (2.31 sq mi)
- Elevation: 344 m (1,129 ft)

Population (2026-01-01)
  - Total: 570
  - Density: 95/km^{2} (250/sq mi)
- Time zone: UTC+1 (CET)
  - Summer (DST): UTC+2 (CEST)
- Postal code: 252 61
- Website: www.dobroviz.cz

Dobrovíz is a municipality and village in Prague-West District in the Central Bohemian Region of the Czech Republic. It has about 600 inhabitants. The village has well preserved folk architecture and is protected as a village monument reservation.

== Etymology ==
The name is derived from the personal name Dobrovid, meaning "Dobrovid's (court)".

== Geography ==
Dobrovíz is located about 8 kilometres (5 mi) west of Prague. It lies in a flat agricultural landscape in the Prague Plateau.

== History ==
The first written mention of Dobrovíz is from 1238, when the village was donated to the Zderaz Monastery in what is today Prague-New Town. For a short time, there was a fortress, but it was probably destroyed during the Hussite Wars. From 1447 to 1621, Dobrovíz was owned by the Kolowrat family as a part of the Buštěhrad estate. During the Thirty Years' War, the village was badly damaged. In 1645, Dobrovíz was returned to the Christian church, then it was acquired by the Jesuits, who owned it until 1773.

== Demographics ==
Historical population

Year	Pop.	±%
1869	510	—
1880	468	−8.2%
1890	519	+10.9%
1900	566	+9.1%
1910	638	+12.7%

Year	Pop.	±%
1921	607	−4.9%
1930	719	+18.5%
1950	618	−14.0%
1961	637	+3.1%
1970	621	−2.5%

Year	Pop.	±%
1980	550	−11.4%
1991	463	−15.8%
2001	466	+0.6%
2011	548	+17.6%
2021	613	+11.9%

Source: Censuses

== Economy ==
There is a distribution centre of Amazon in the municipality. It covers an area of 9.5 ha (23 acres) and is the largest free-standing industrial building in the country.

== Transport ==
The D6 motorway (part of the European route E48) from Prague to Karlovy Vary runs through the southern part of the municipality.

Dobrovíz is located on the railway lines Prague–Středokluky and Hostivice–Noutonice. There are three train stops: Dobrovíz, Dobrovíz-Amazon and Hostouň u Prahy.

The Václav Havel Airport Prague is partially located in the municipal territory.

== Sights ==
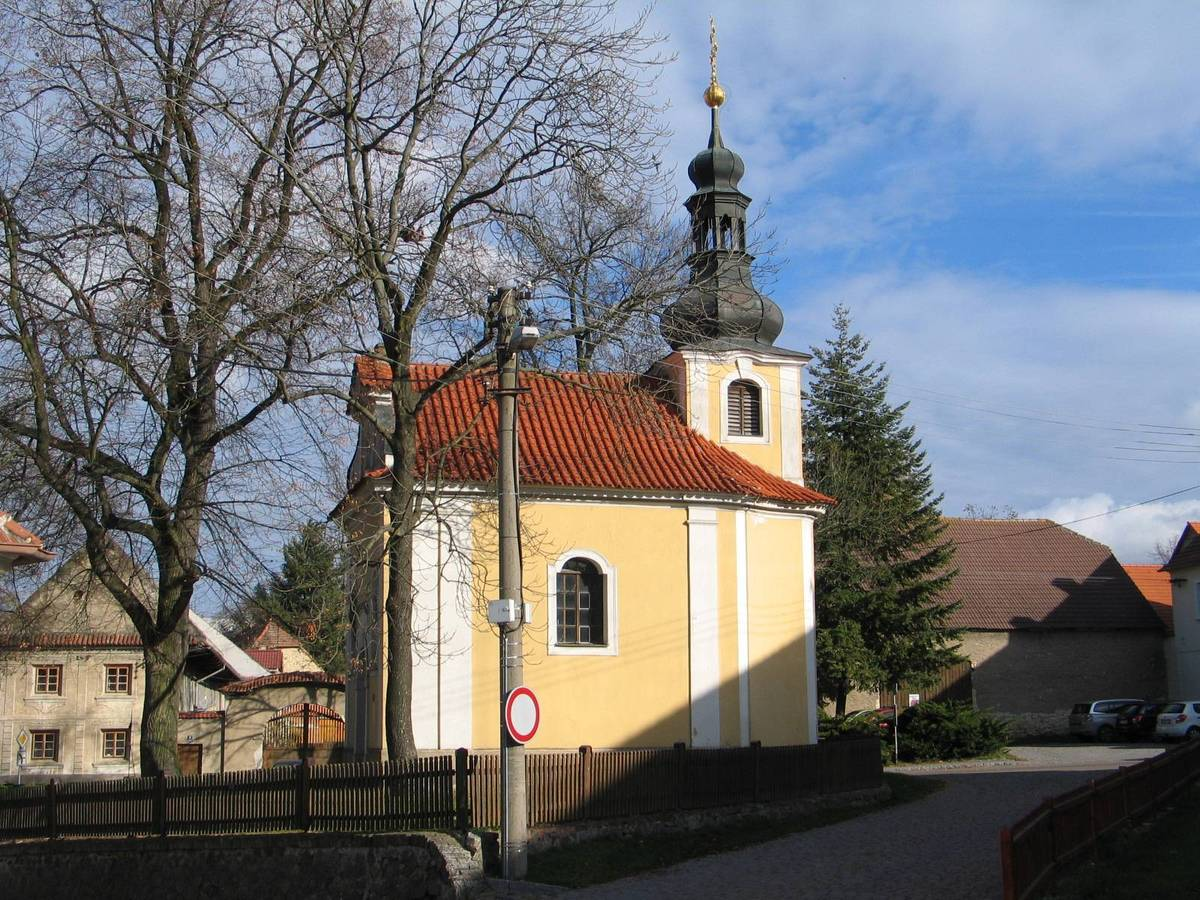
Chapel of the Virgin Mary

The historic centre of Dobrovíz is declared a village monument reservation. The set of folk architecture houses consists of brick buildings from the 18th and 19th centuries with stucco façade decoration. The Chapel of the Virgin Mary is a Baroque building located in the centre of Dobrovíz.

West pole of Prague is located on the border between Prague and Dobrovíz.
