= Hostouň =

Hostouň may refer to places in the Czech Republic:

- Hostouň (Domažlice District), a town in the Plzeň Region
- Hostouň (Kladno District), a municipality and village in the Central Bohemian Region
