= Hovorčovice =

- Municipality
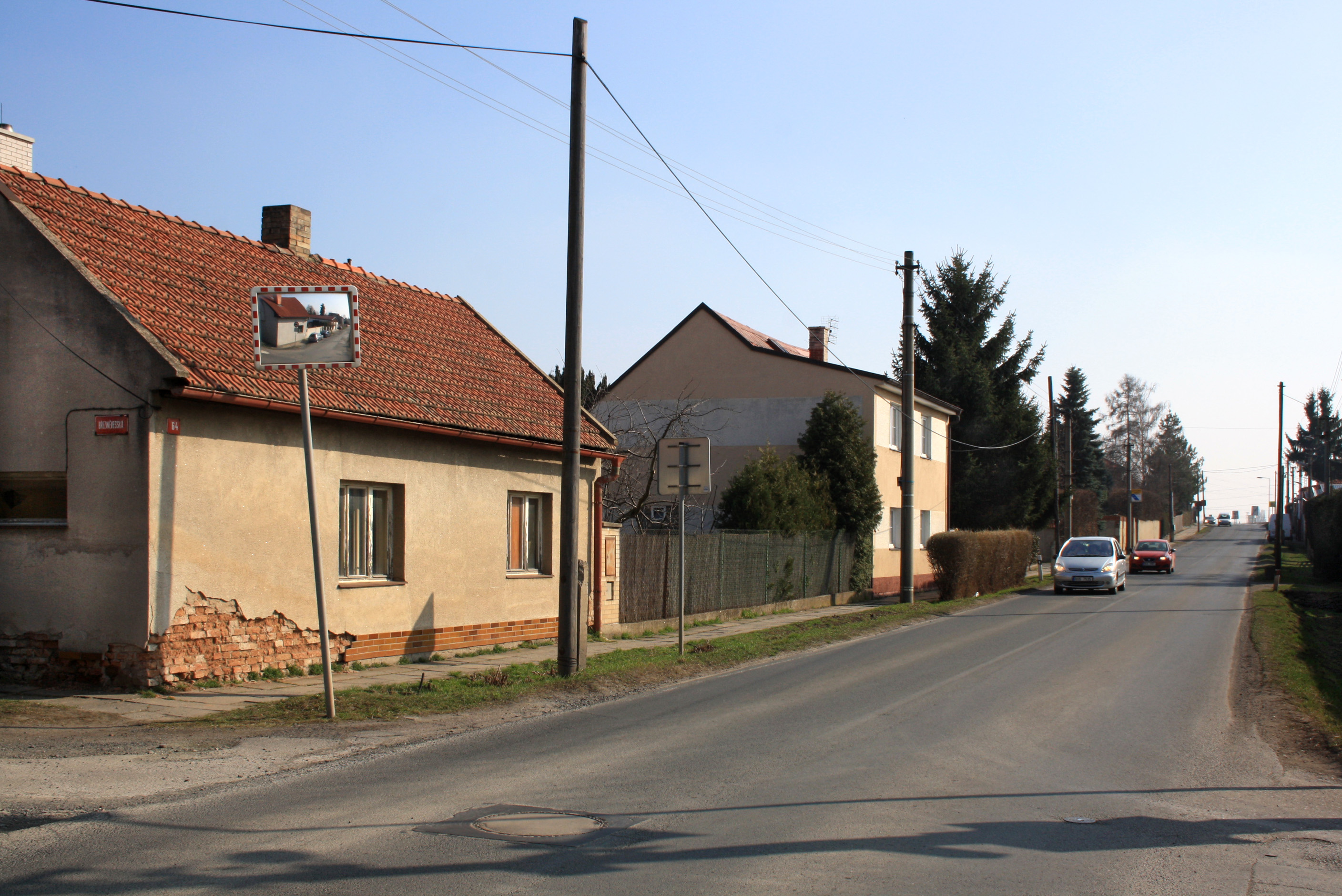
- Main street

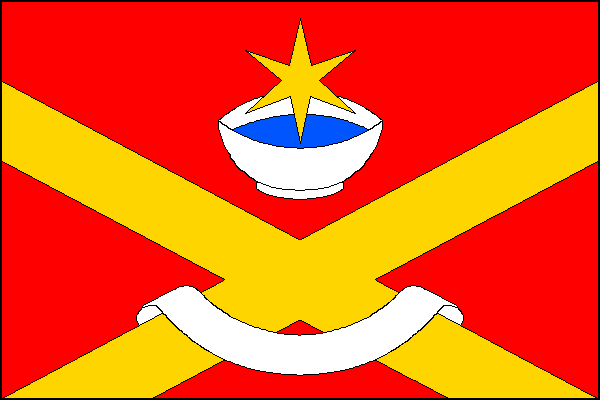
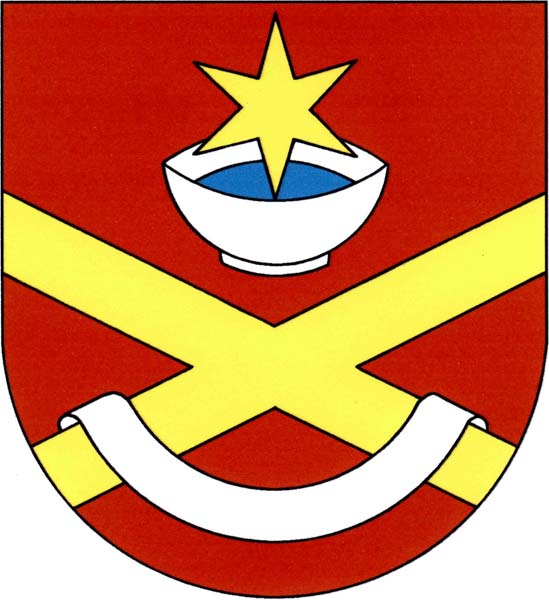
- Flag Coat of arms

- Location in the Czech Republic
- Coordinates: 50°10′43″N 14°31′5″E
- Country: Czech Republic
- Region: Central Bohemian
- District: Prague-East
- First mentioned: 1088

Area
  - Total: 2.14 km^{2} (0.83 sq mi)
- Elevation: 226 m (741 ft)

Population (2026-01-01)
  - Total: 2,657
  - Density: 1,240/km^{2} (3,220/sq mi)
- Time zone: UTC+1 (CET)
  - Summer (DST): UTC+2 (CEST)
- Postal code: 250 64
- Website: www.hovorcovice.cz

Hovorčovice is a municipality and village in Prague-East District in the Central Bohemian Region of the Czech Republic. It has about 2,700 inhabitants.

== Etymology ==
The name is derived from the personal name Hovořic or Hovora, meaning "the village of Hovořic's (Hovora's) people". The term hovora, from which the personal name arose, used to denote a person who talked a lot.

== Geography ==
Hovorčovice is located about 6 kilometres (4 mi) north of Prague. It lies in a flat agricultural landscape in the Central Elbe Table. In the centre of the village is a fishpond.

== History ==
The first written mention of Hovorčovice is from 1088, when King Vratislaus II donated the village to the Vyšehrad Chapter. The village was almost completely destroyed by the Swedish army during the Thirty Years' War. From 1652 to 1945, the estate was owned by the Nostitz family. The independent municipality was established in 1908.

== Demographics ==
Historical population

Year	Pop.	±%
1869	260	—
1880	329	+26.5%
1890	370	+12.5%
1900	352	−4.9%
1910	347	−1.4%

Year	Pop.	±%
1921	350	+0.9%
1930	552	+57.7%
1950	724	+31.2%
1961	918	+26.8%
1970	954	+3.9%

Year	Pop.	±%
1980	1,073	+12.5%
1991	976	−9.0%
2001	984	+0.8%
2011	2,361	+139.9%
2021	2,687	+13.8%

Source: Censuses

== Transport ==
Hovorčovice is located on the railway line Prague–Mělník. It is also served by suburban buses (part of the Prague Integrated Transport system).

== Sights ==
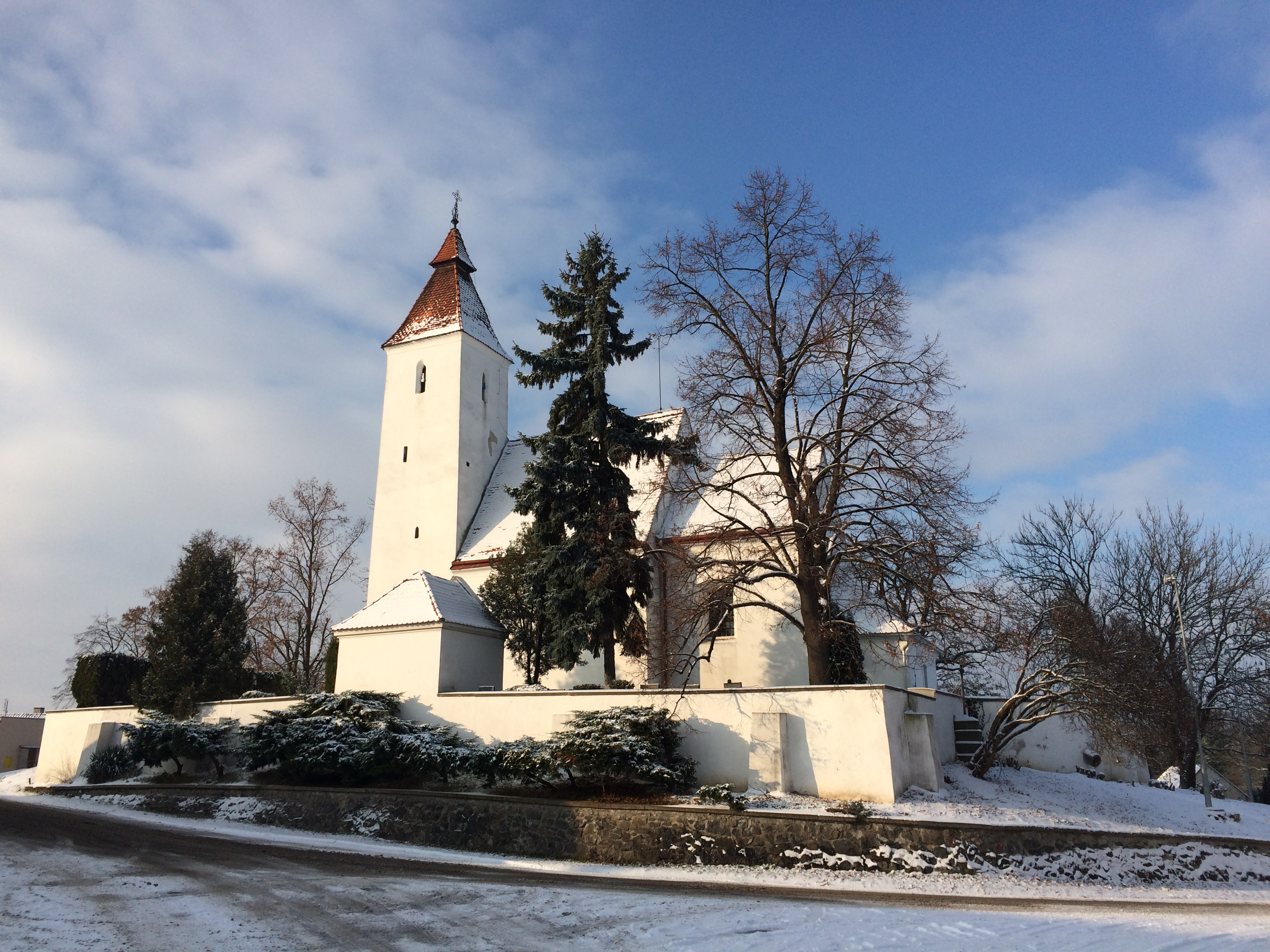
Church of the Nativity of Saint John the Baptist

The main landmark of Hovorčovice is the Church of the Nativity of Saint John the Baptist. It was built in the early Gothic style in the second half of the 13th century and rebuilt in the Baroque style.

North pole of Prague is located on the tripoint of Prague, Hovorčovice and Veleň.
