= Ohrobec =

- Municipality
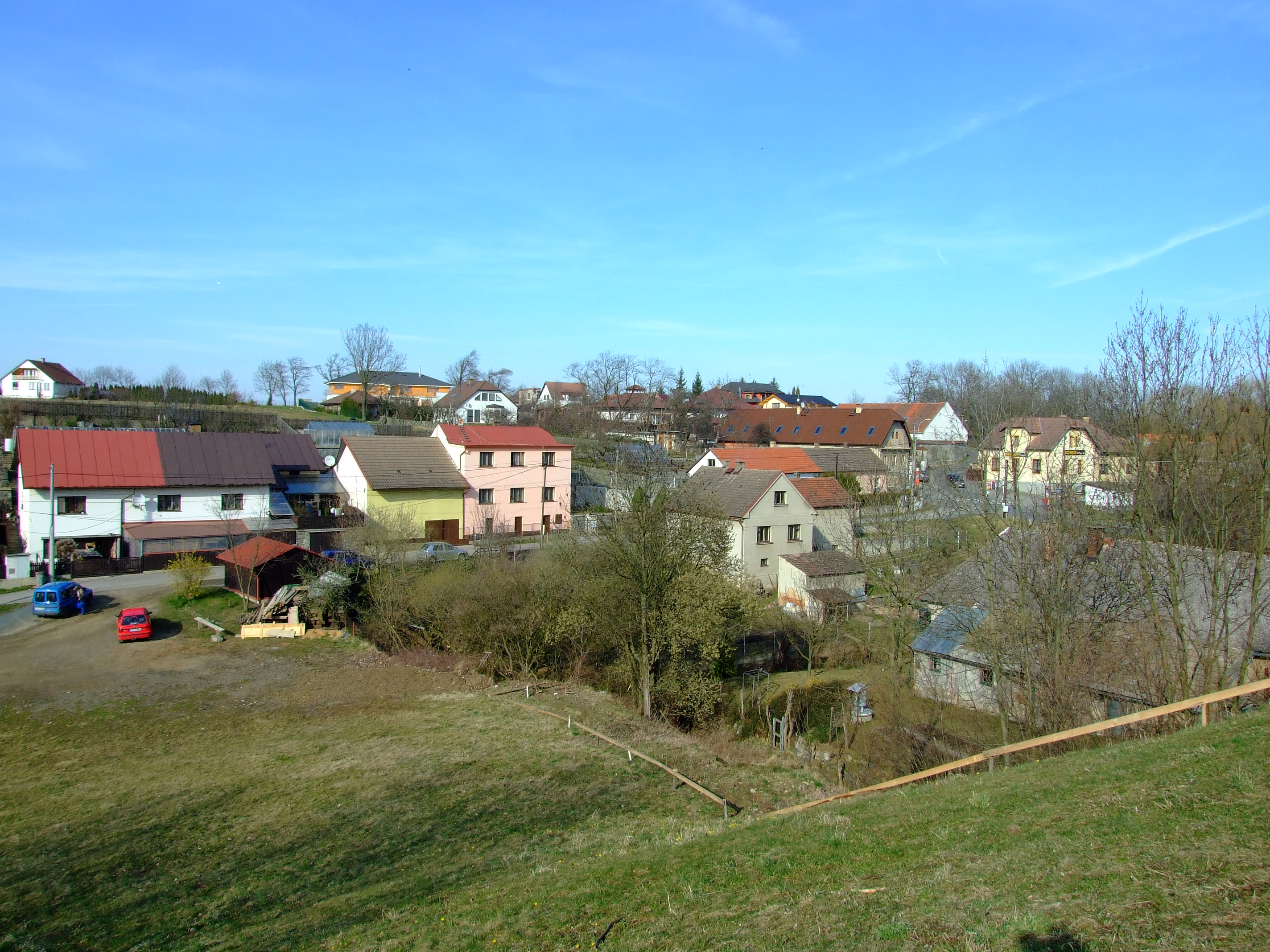
- Central part of Ohrobec

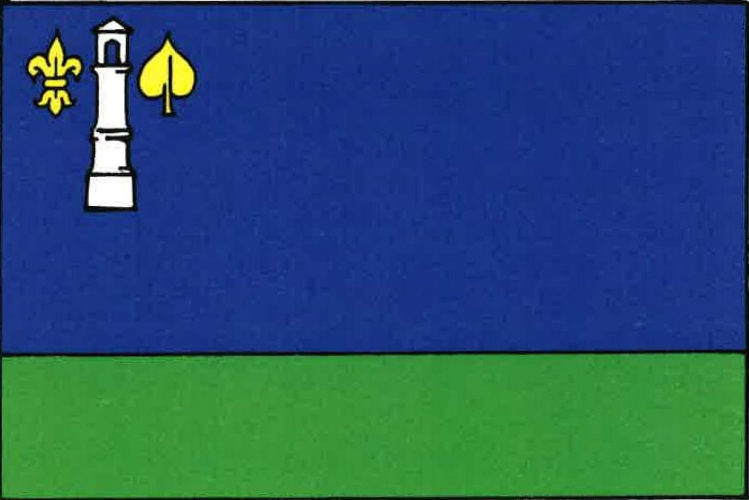
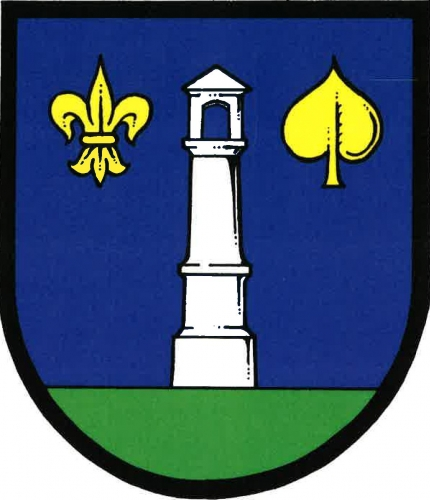
- Flag Coat of arms

- Location in the Czech Republic
- Coordinates: 49°56′30″N 14°25′56″E
- Country: Czech Republic
- Region: Central Bohemian
- District: Prague-West
- First mentioned: 1356

Area
  - Total: 4.34 km^{2} (1.68 sq mi)
- Elevation: 355 m (1,165 ft)

Population (2026-01-01)
  - Total: 1,617
  - Density: 373/km^{2} (965/sq mi)
- Time zone: UTC+1 (CET)
  - Summer (DST): UTC+2 (CEST)
- Postal code: 252 45
- Website: www.ohrobec.cz

Ohrobec is a municipality and village in Prague-West District in the Central Bohemian Region of the Czech Republic. It has about 1,600 inhabitants.

== Etymology ==
The Czech word ohrobec used to refer to an embankment next to a road, into which stones were placed to prevent wagons from driving into it. The village was founded by the road with such a provision.

== Geography ==
Ohrobec is located about 11 kilometres (7 mi) south of Prague. It lies in the Prague Plateau. The highest point is at 385 m (1,263 ft) above sea level. The municipality is situated on an elevated plateau above the Vltava River, which flows along the western municipal border, just outside the municipality. A nameless brook supplies a system of small fishponds in the centre of the village. Ohrobec is urbanistically fused with the village of Zálepy (administratively a part of Dolní Břežany).

== History ==
The first written mention of Ohrobec is in a deed of King Charles IV from 1356, when it belonged to the Zvole estate. In 1363, the village was bought by the Zbraslav Monastery. In 1436, the Zvole estate was acquired by the Beneda of Nečtiny family and annexed to the Dolní Břežany estate. Ohrobec remained part of this estate until the establishment of an independent municipality in 1848.

== Demographics ==
Historical population

Year	Pop.	±%
1869	192	—
1880	180	−6.2%
1890	204	+13.3%
1900	200	−2.0%
1910	210	+5.0%

Year	Pop.	±%
1921	221	+5.2%
1930	208	−5.9%
1950	320	+53.8%
1961	343	+7.2%
1970	309	−9.9%

Year	Pop.	±%
1980	277	−10.4%
1991	259	−6.5%
2001	597	+130.5%
2011	1,224	+105.0%
2021	1,572	+28.4%

Source: Censuses

== Transport ==
There are no railways or major roads passing through the municipality.

== Sights ==
The only protected cultural monument in the municipality is a small granite column belfry. It was created in 1868.
