= Veleň =

- Municipality
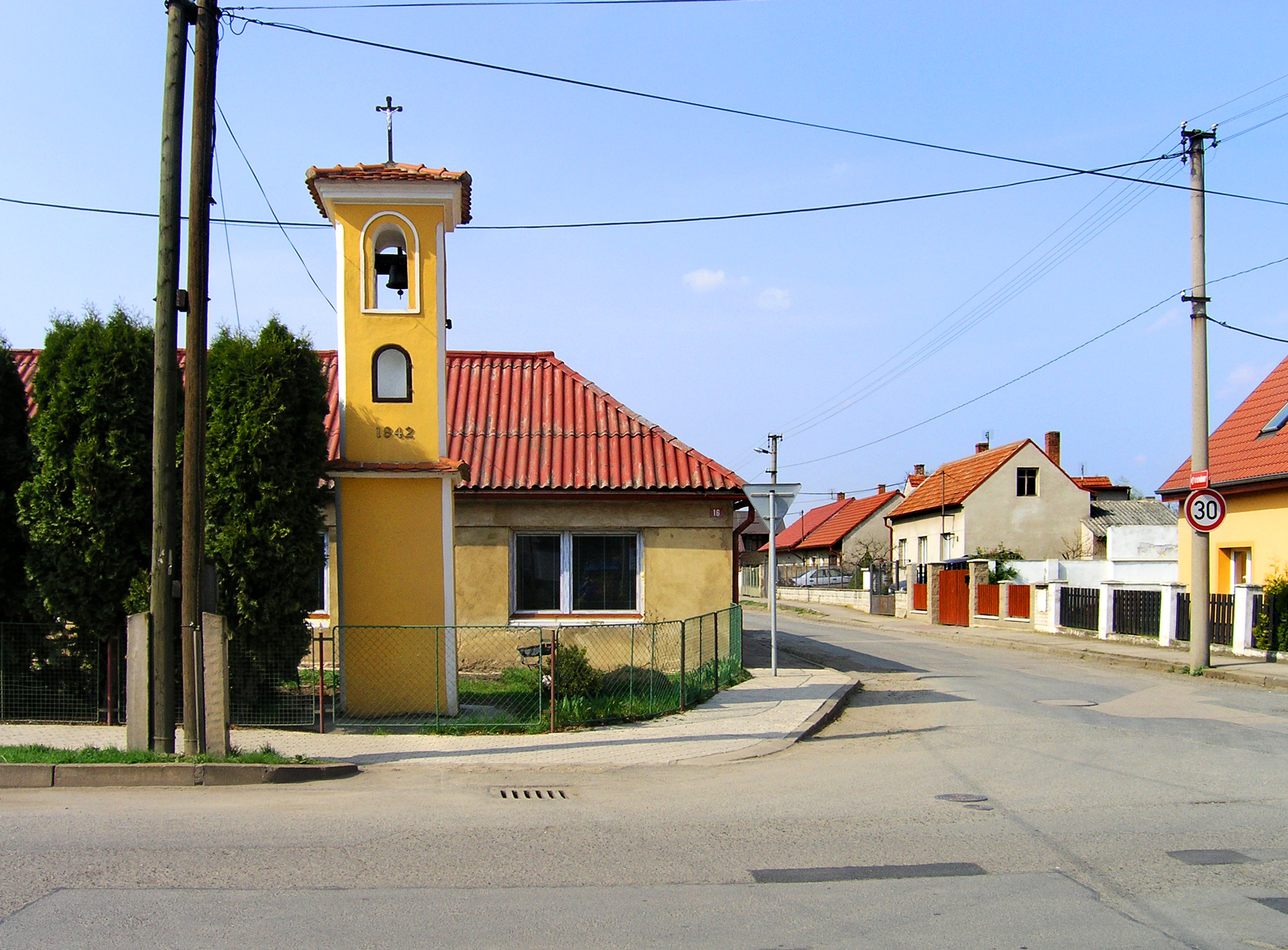
- Belfry in the centre of Veleň

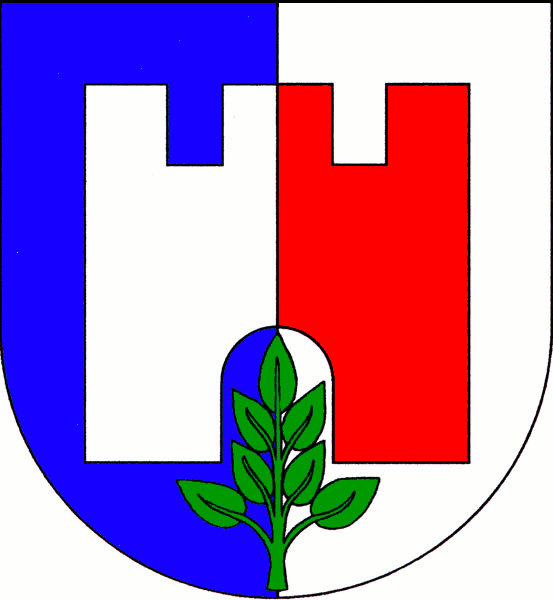
- Flag Coat of arms

- Location in the Czech Republic
- Coordinates: 50°10′24″N 14°33′15″E
- Country: Czech Republic
- Region: Central Bohemian
- District: Prague-East
- First mentioned: 1318

Area
  - Total: 6.87 km^{2} (2.65 sq mi)
- Elevation: 211 m (692 ft)

Population (2026-01-01)
  - Total: 2,072
  - Density: 302/km^{2} (781/sq mi)
- Time zone: UTC+1 (CET)
  - Summer (DST): UTC+2 (CEST)
- Postal code: 250 63
- Website: www.velen.cz

Veleň is a municipality and village in Prague-East District in the Central Bohemian Region of the Czech Republic. It has about 2,100 inhabitants.

== Administrative division ==
Veleň consists of two municipal parts (in brackets population according to the 2021 census):

- Veleň (1,317)
- Mírovice (555)

== Etymology ==
The name is derived from the personal name Velen, meaning "Velen's (court)".

== Geography ==
Veleň is located about 7 kilometres (4 mi) north of Prague. It lies in a flat agricultural landscape in the Central Elbe Table.

== History ==
The first written mention of Veleň is from 1318. Until 1678, it was owned by various lesser noblemen. In 1678, the Nostitz family bought Veleň and annexed it to the Pakoměřice estate.

== Demographics ==
Historical population

Year	Pop.	±%
1869	437	—
1880	525	+20.1%
1890	632	+20.4%
1900	663	+4.9%
1910	634	−4.4%

Year	Pop.	±%
1921	675	+6.5%
1930	903	+33.8%
1950	864	−4.3%
1961	930	+7.6%
1970	882	−5.2%

Year	Pop.	±%
1980	796	−9.8%
1991	750	−5.8%
2001	764	+1.9%
2011	958	+25.4%
2021	1,872	+95.4%

Source: Censuses

== Transport ==
The railway line Prague–Všetaty briefly crosses the municipal territory in the west, but there is no train station.

== Sights ==
There are no protected cultural monuments in the municipality.
