= Břve =

- Village
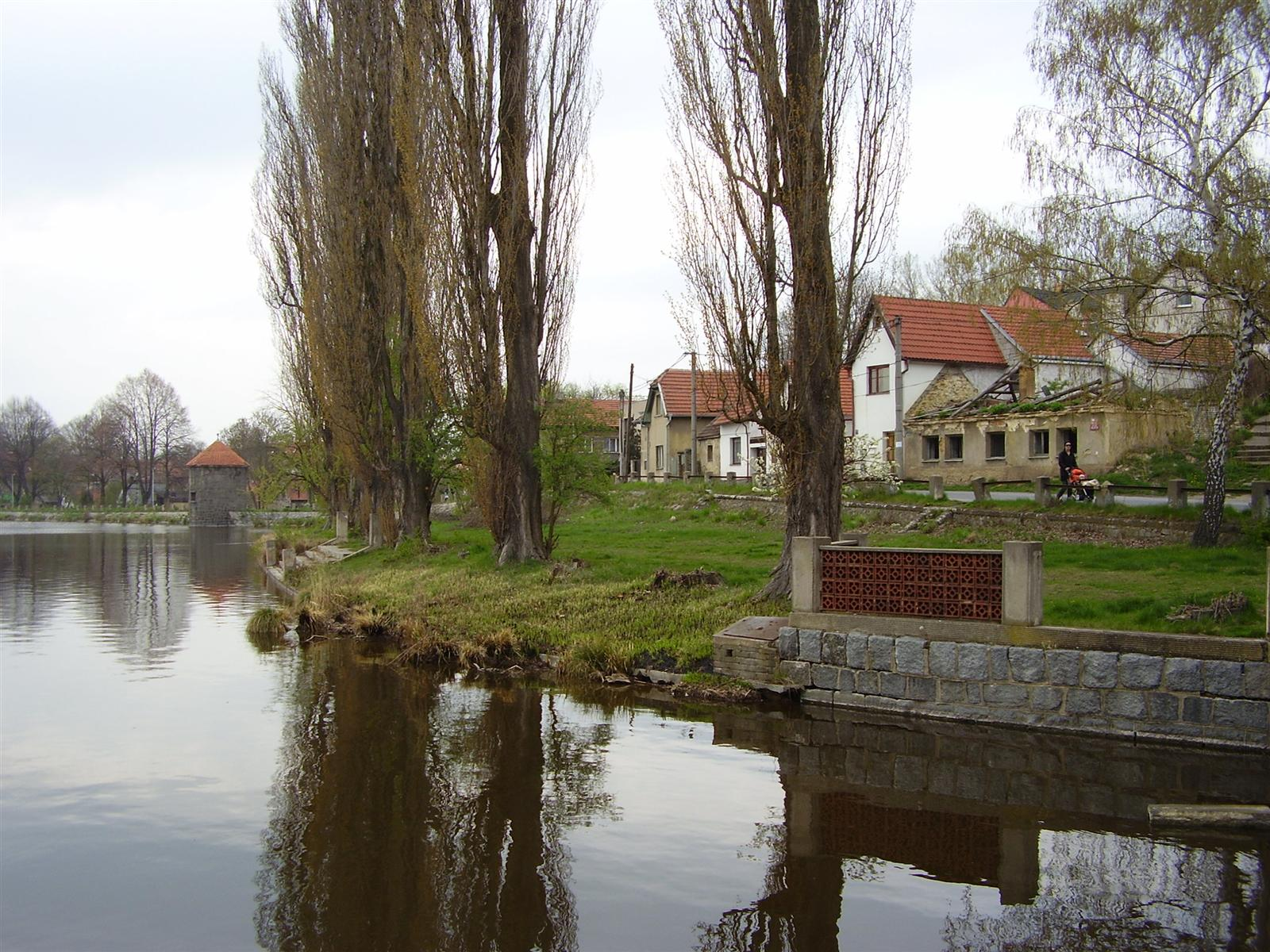
- Fishpond Břevský rybník

- Location in the Czech Republic
- Coordinates: 50°4′11″N 14°14′40″E
- Country: Czech Republic
- Region: Central Bohemian
- District: Prague-West
- Municipality: Hostivice
- First mentioned: 1184

Area
  - Total: 1.53 km^{2} (0.59 sq mi)
- Elevation: 352 m (1,155 ft)

Population (2021)
  - Total: 132
  - Density: 86.3/km^{2} (223/sq mi)
- Time zone: UTC+1 (CET)
  - Summer (DST): UTC+2 (CEST)
- Postal code: 253 01

Břve is a village and municipal part of Hostivice in Prague-West District in the Central Bohemian Region of the Czech Republic.

== Geography ==
There is the fishpond Břevský rybník in the village.

== History ==
The first written mention of Břve is from 1184.

== Demographics ==
Historical population
Year	Pop.	±%
1869	239	—
1880	239	+0.0%
1890	299	+25.1%
1900	285	−4.7%
1910	260	−8.8%
1921	287	+10.4%
1930	261	−9.1%
1950	182	−30.3%
1961	205	+12.6%
1970	198	−3.4%
1980	168	−15.2%
1991	123	−26.8%
2001	128	+4.1%
2011	123	−3.9%
2021	132	+7.3%
Source: Censuses
