= Prague Poles =

Furthest cardinal points of Prague

The Prague Poles are the furthest points of the territory of Prague in all four cardinal directions. The poles are determined by the border between the capital city of Prague and the Central Bohemian Region. The poles were marked in November 2020 by Ondřej Boháč, director of Prague Institute of Planning and Development and Czech reporter Janek Rubeš. In addition, the center of Prague is marked in the same way. They are marked by 180 kg concrete bollards.

== North pole of Prague ==
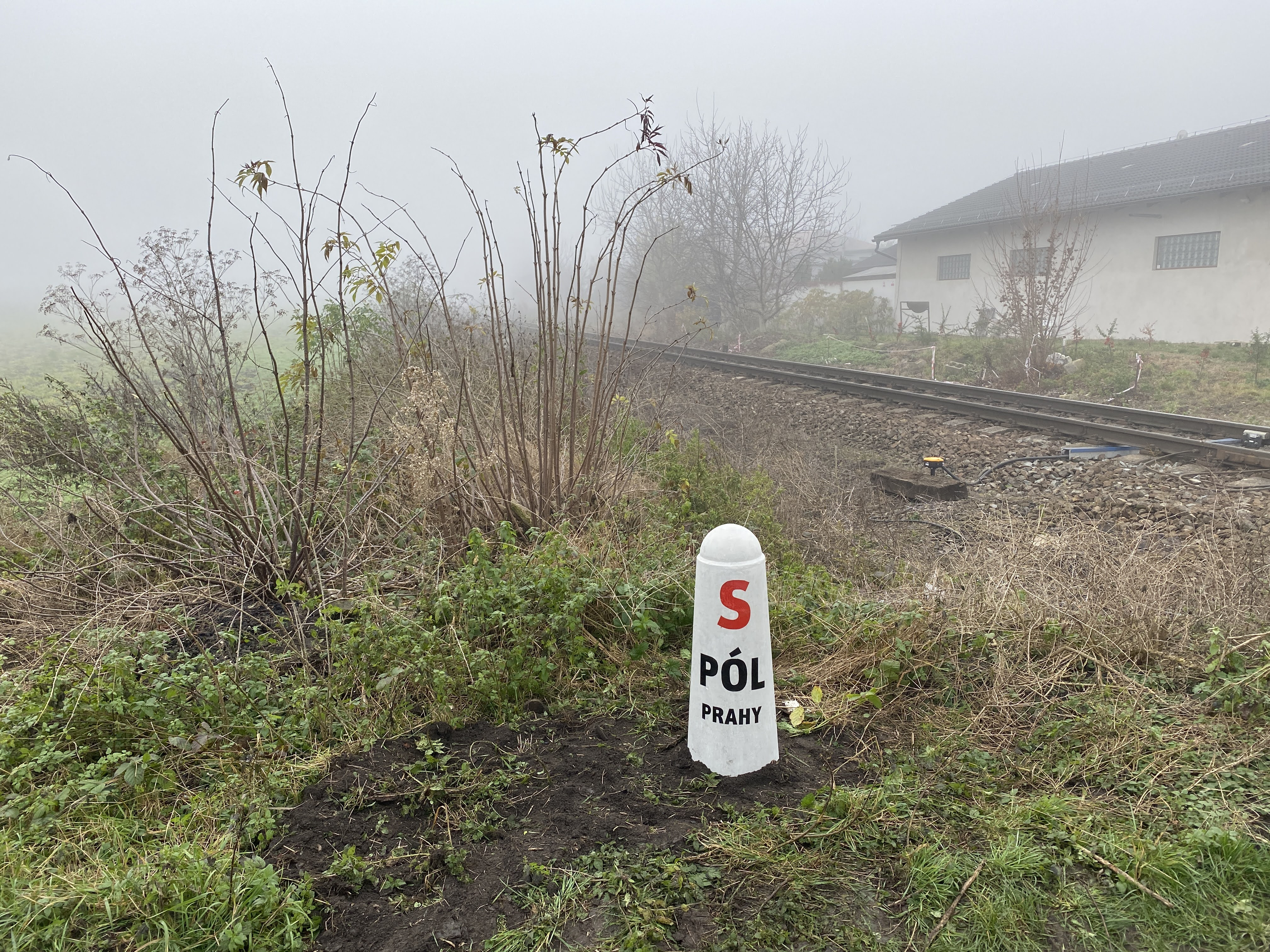
The North pole of Prague

- 50.1774297°N 14.5268564°E

The North pole of Prague lies on the border between the cadastral area of Třeboradice and Hovorčovice, on southeastern edge of the outskirts of Hovorčovice, in the Veleňská street near railway crossing. Place is publicly accessible. Concrete column marking the pole is not placed directly on the pole. Due to the railway protection zone, it is placed on the other side of railway tracks.

== South pole of Prague ==
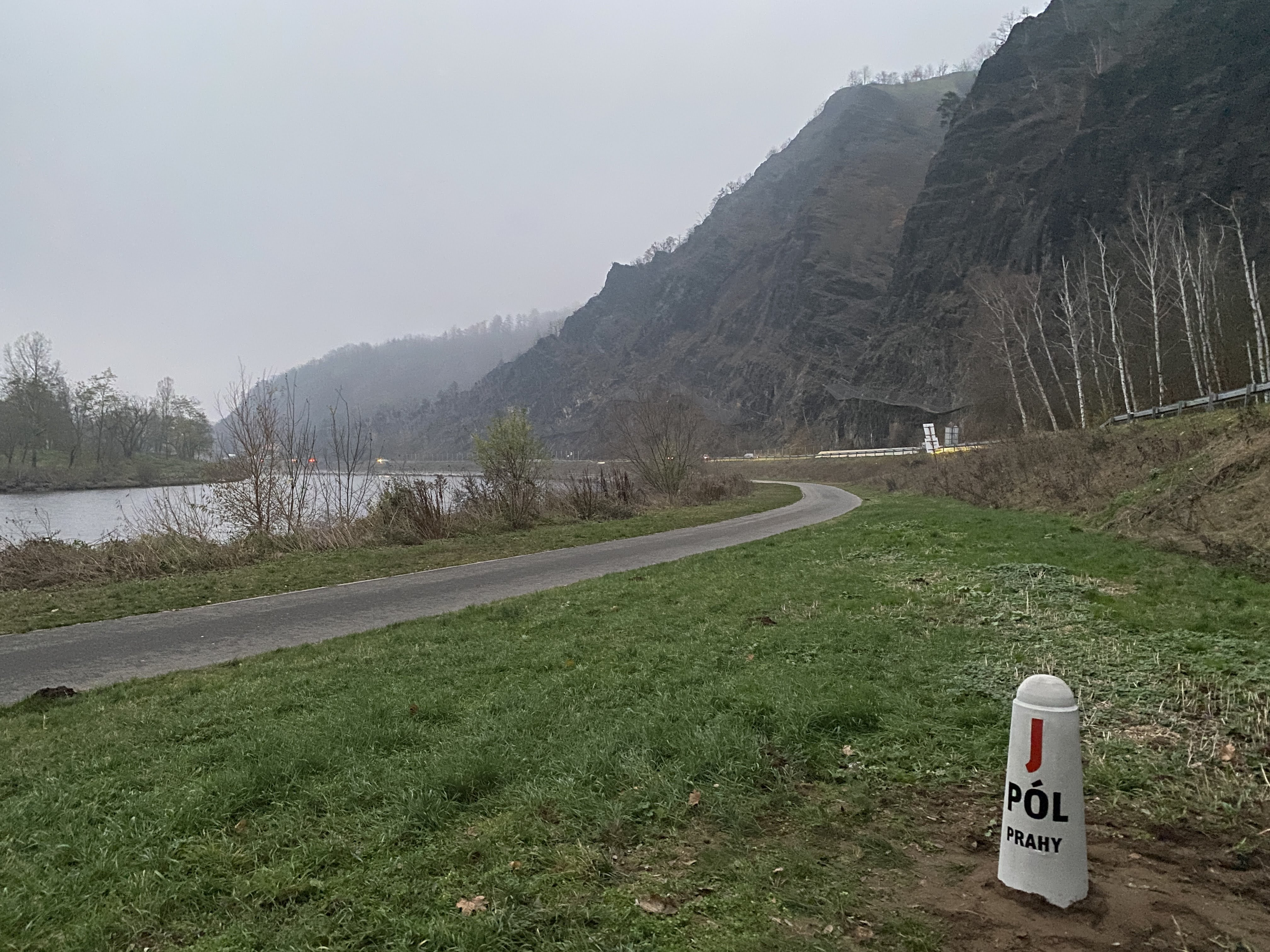
The South pole of Prague

- 49.9419000°N 14.3955631°E

The South pole of Prague lies on the border of Zbraslav and Zvole, about 200 meters from the outskirts of Vrané nad Vltavou. The point is located in the floodplain on the right bank of the Vltava River between the A2 cycle path and the road connecting Vrané nad Vltavou and Jarov. Place is publicly accessible. Place is marked by a concrete column with a description.

== East pole of Prague ==
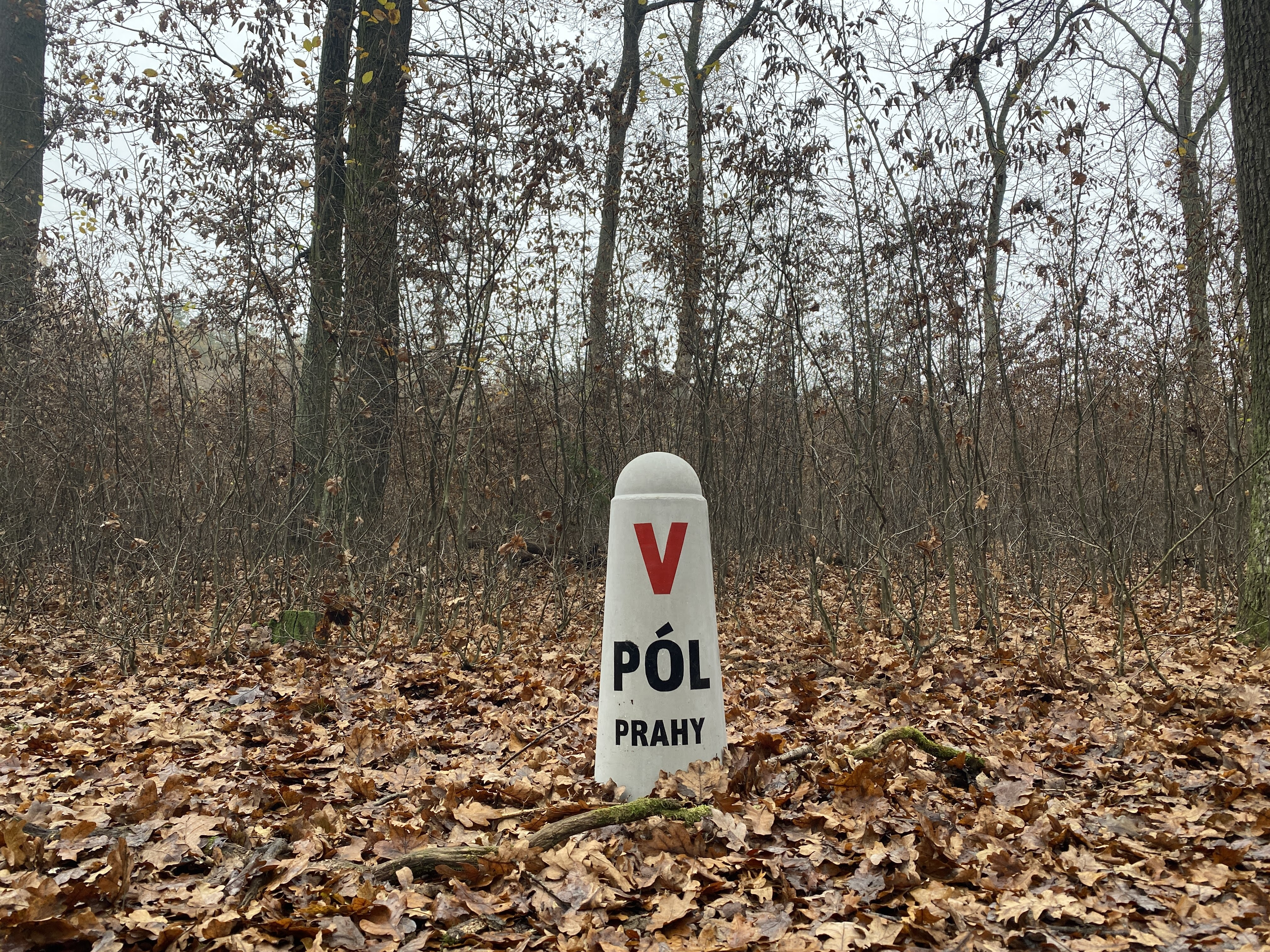
The East pole of Prague

- 50.0870189°N 14.7067875°E

The East pole of Prague lies in the Klánovice Forest near Klánovice on the border of Újezd nad Lesy and Úvaly, about 500 meters west of the outskirts of Úvaly. Place is publicly accessible. Place is marked by a concrete column with a description. It lies about 50 meters away from the forest road with a green tourist sign, but in a dense thicket.

== West pole of Prague ==
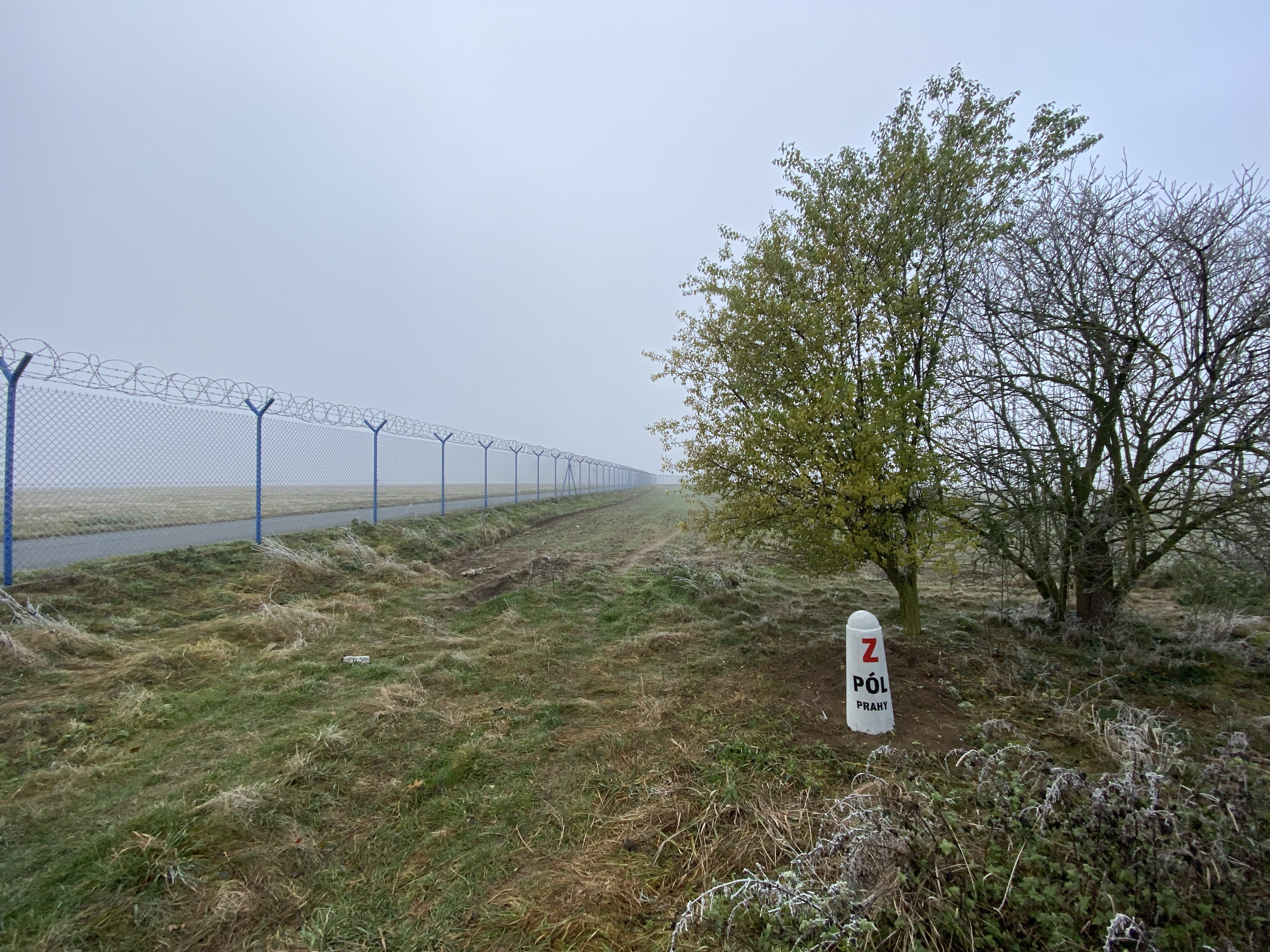
The West pole of Prague

- 50.1029964°N 14.2244369°E

The West pole of Prague lies on the border of Dobrovíz and Ruzyně, in the Security restricted area of Václav Havel Airport Prague, so it is inaccessible to the public. The concrete column with a description is therefore located at the end of the access road in front of the airport area, in a publicly accessible place about 100 meters from the geodetic west pole itself.

== Center of Prague ==
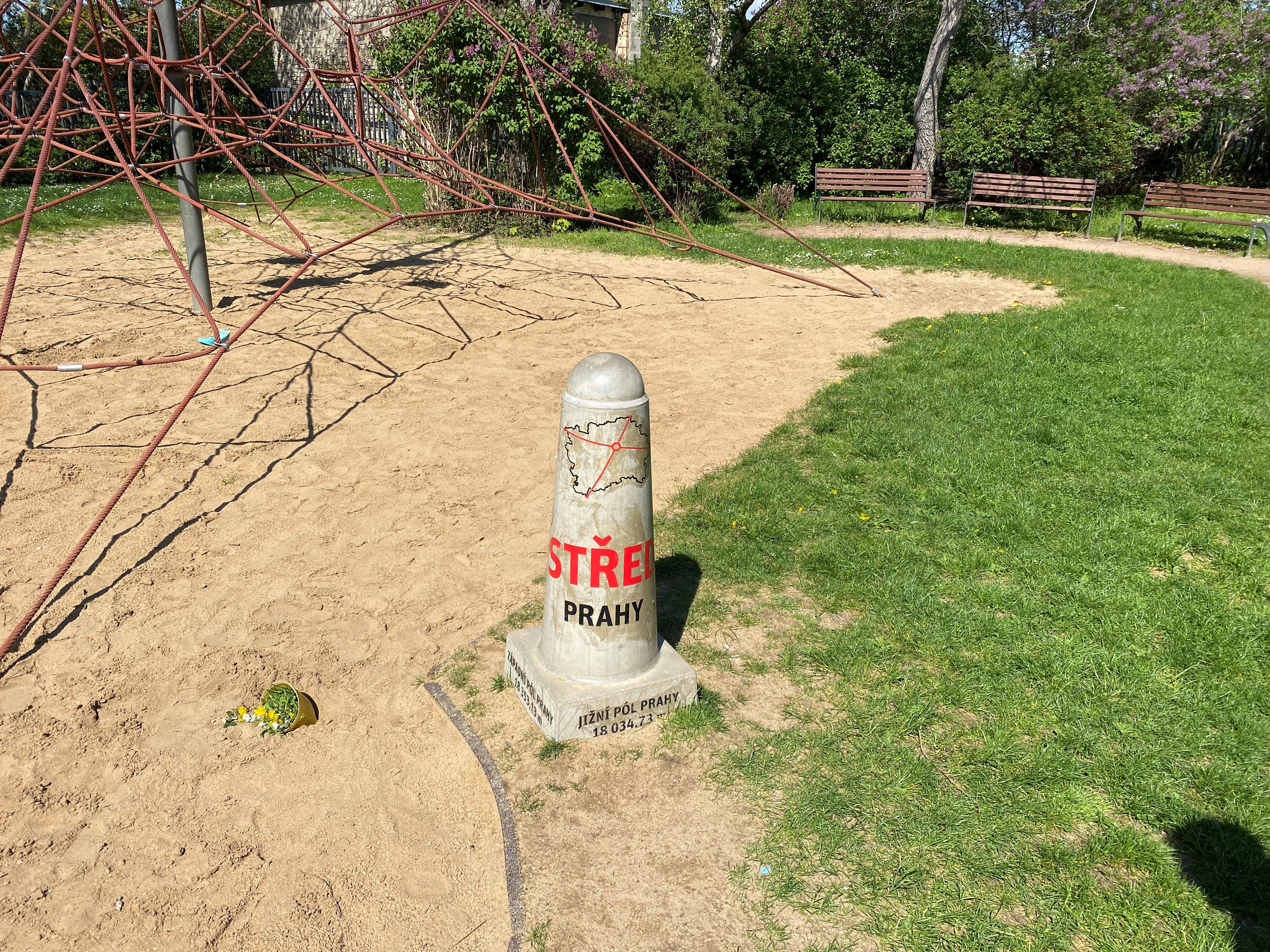
The center of Prague

- 50.0945138°N 14.4806441°E

It is located in the children's playground at the intersection of the lines connecting the East and West Poles and the North and South Poles, i.e., it is not a geometric center of Prague in any definitions. It was installed on June 4, 2021.

== See also ==
- Extreme points of the Czech Republic
