= Hostivice Ponds =

Protected area in the Czech Republic

- IUCN category III (natural monument or feature)
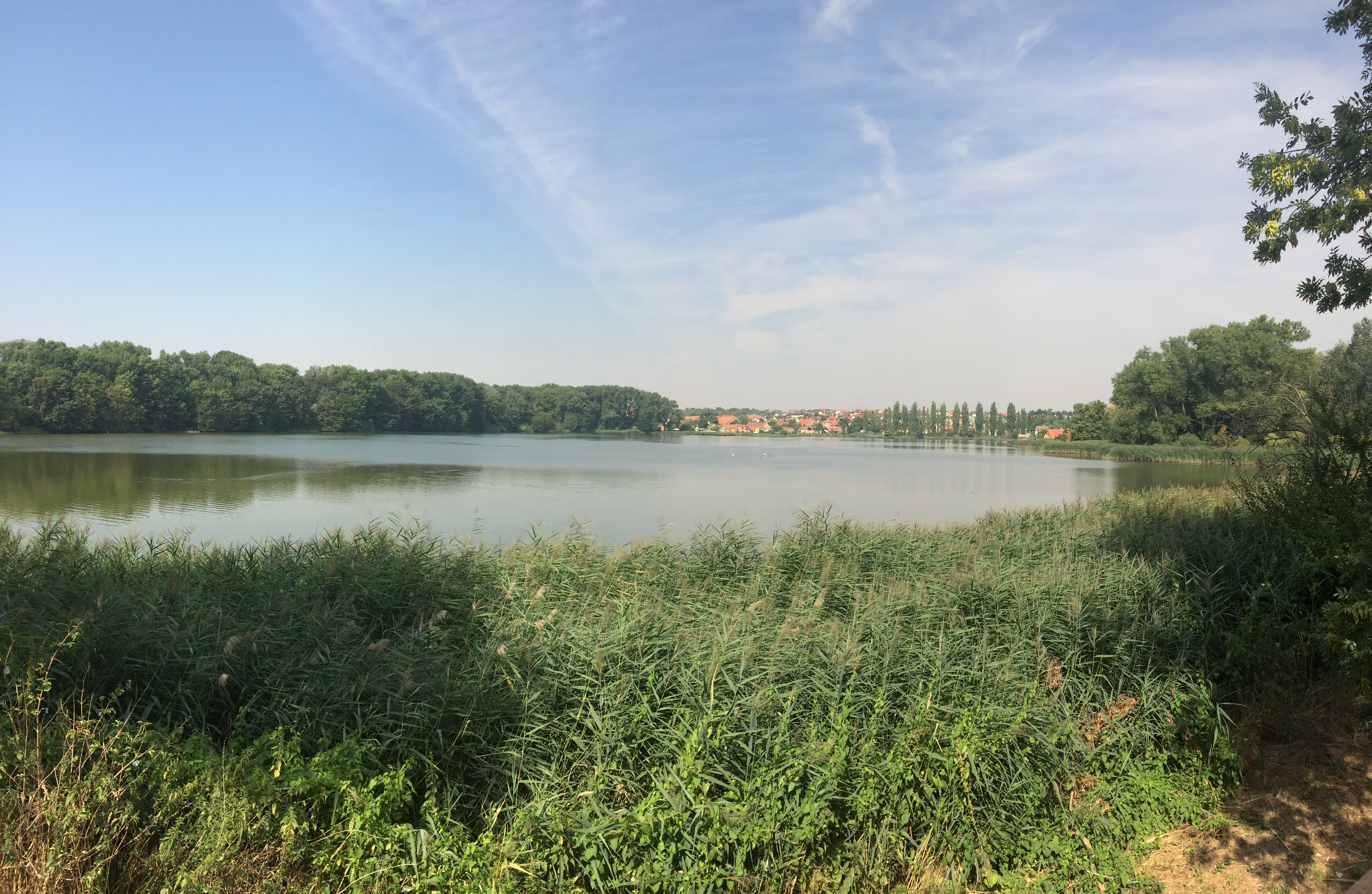
- Litovický Pond

- Location within Czech Republic
- Location: Hostivice
- Coordinates: 50.071°N 14.249°E
- Area: 112.87 ha (278.9 acres)
- Established: 26 October 1996

The Hostivice Ponds (Czech: Hostivické rybníky) are a nature monument in Hostivice in the Central Bohemian Region of the Czech Republic. The nature monument consists of a system of three ponds (litovický, Kalý and Břevský), supplied by the Litovický Stream, and their nearest surroundings.

This small-scale protected area was established on 14 October 1996 by the District Office of Western Prague with the aim of the conservation of natural communities of the pond system. In the adjacent wetlands and forests rare and endangered species of plants and animals can be found. During the reign of Rudolf II the fishponds in the area served as a source of water for Prague Castle.

== Flora ==
In 1972 rare fungus Haasiella venustissima, previously found in only two localities in Czechoslovakia, was found in the area. Also found in the reeds are tufted sedge (Carex cespitosa), bistort (Persicaria bistorta) and great burnet (Sanguisorba officinalis). In the past western marsh orchids and black poplars, could be found, but they have not been seen in recent years.

== History ==
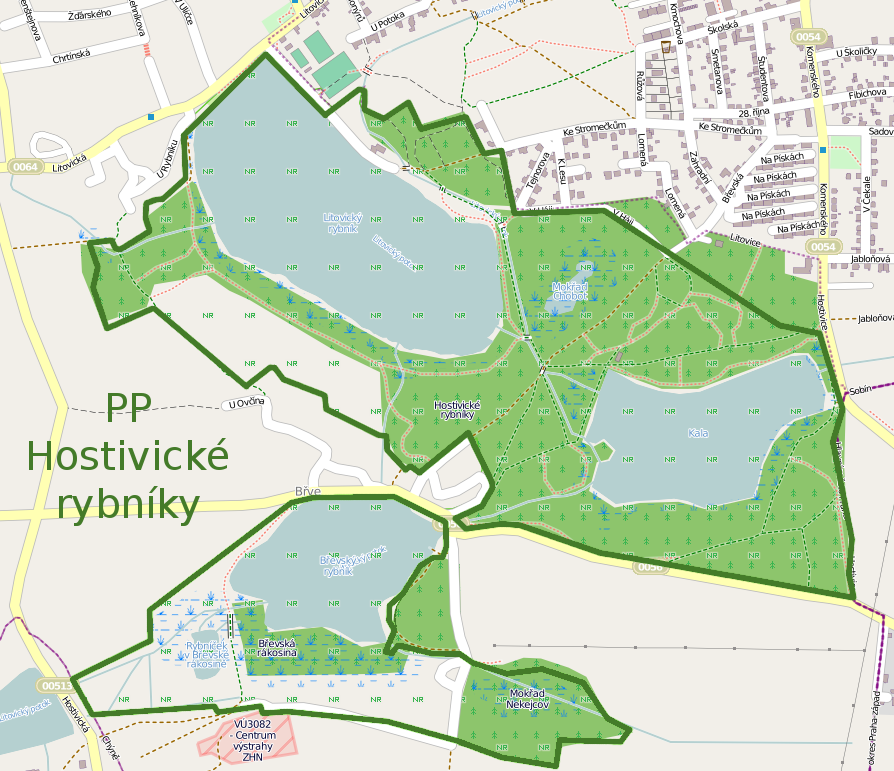
Map showing the boundaries of the protected area

From a historical perspective, it was important that the pond system served as the source region of water for water supply, supplying the Prague Castle during the reign of Rudolf II.

On the shore of the Břevský pond was then built camp, which was subsequently abandoned. Currently, the buildings in the camp removed. This area is often used for illegal waste disposal. Hostivice Ponds Nature Monument was established in 1996 and since that time the development of its old Czech Union for Nature Conservation, in particular its basic organization in Hostivice.

== Literature ==
- Kotlaba F., Pouzar J. (2003): Houby PP Hostivické rybníky u Prahy. – Bohemia centralis, 26: 225–236, Prague (in Czech)
- Hostivice 1998 Anthology of nature, the places and the history of the city. Czech Republic Union for Conservation of Nature Hostivice
- Hostivice – 700 years of life and work: 1277–1977 (PDF). Hostivice: Local National Committee Hostivice. 1977. p. 105.
- Jiří, Kučera (2006). Přírodní památka Hostivické rybníky (in Czech). Hostivice: Czech Union for Nature Conservation. p. 72. ISBN 80-239-7554-4.
