= Středokluky =

- Municipality
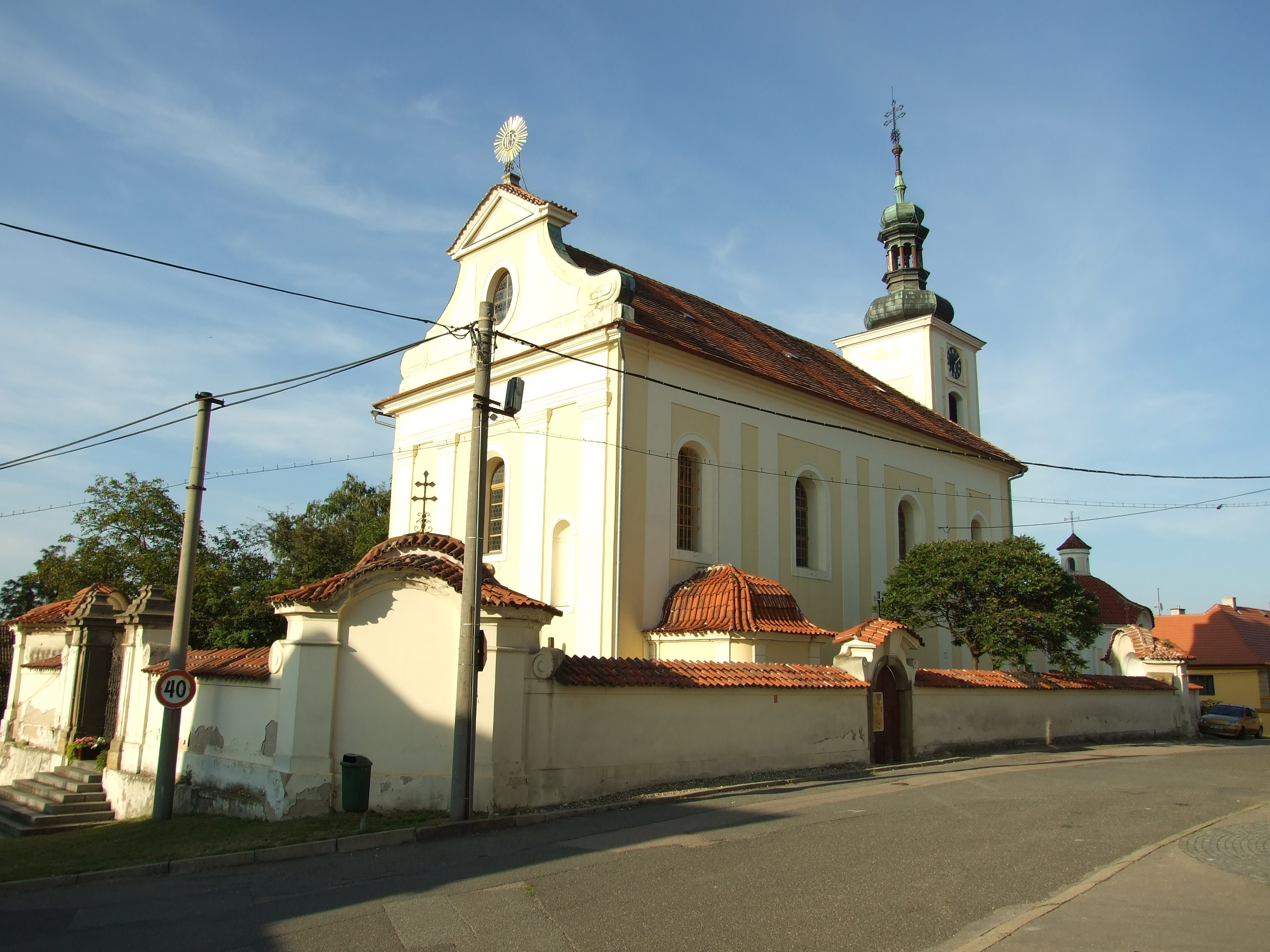
- Church of Saint Procopius

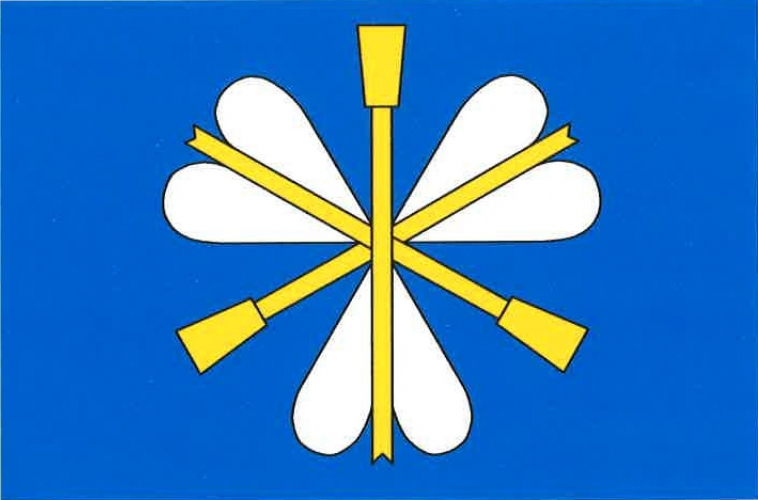
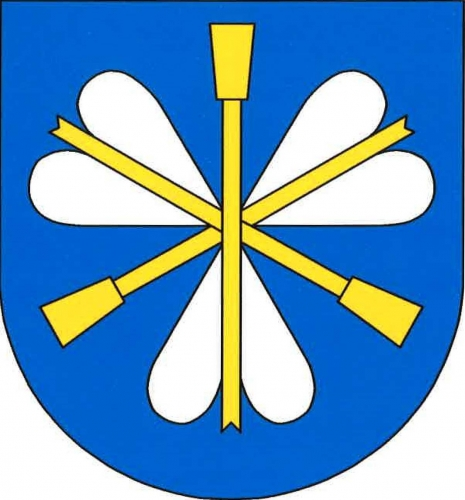
- Flag Coat of arms

- Location in the Czech Republic
- Coordinates: 50°7′56″N 14°14′3″E
- Country: Czech Republic
- Region: Central Bohemian
- District: Prague-West
- First mentioned: 1316

Area
  - Total: 5.54 km^{2} (2.14 sq mi)
- Elevation: 328 m (1,076 ft)

Population (2026-01-01)
  - Total: 1,299
  - Density: 234/km^{2} (607/sq mi)
- Time zone: UTC+1 (CET)
  - Summer (DST): UTC+2 (CEST)
- Postal code: 252 68
- Website: www.stredokluky.cz

Středokluky is a municipality and village in Prague-West District in the Central Bohemian Region of the Czech Republic. It has about 1,300 inhabitants.

== Etymology ==
The word středokluky referred to people who "alternated arrows" (střídali kluky in old Czech). It probably had a derisive meaning and related to some story.

== Geography ==
Středokluky is located about 9 kilometres (6 mi) northwest of Prague. It lies in a flat agricultural landscape in the Prague Plateau.

== History ==
The first written mention of Středokluky is from 1316. A fortress in Středokluky was first documented in 1414, but it burned down during the Hussite Wars. From the first half of the 16th century until 1623 and then in 1630–1645, Středokluky was owned by the Bezdružický branch of the Kolowrat family. The village was devastated in 1631, during the Thirty Years' War. The ruined village was bought by the Jesuits in 1645, who owned it until 1773. After that it was taken care of by convent in New Town, Prague and the study endowment fund.

== Demographics ==
Historical population

Year	Pop.	±%
1869	709	—
1880	754	+6.3%
1890	681	−9.7%
1900	695	+2.1%
1910	786	+13.1%

Year	Pop.	±%
1921	720	−8.4%
1930	775	+7.6%
1950	754	−2.7%
1961	776	+2.9%
1970	739	−4.8%

Year	Pop.	±%
1980	869	+17.6%
1991	831	−4.4%
2001	843	+1.4%
2011	1,074	+27.4%
2021	1,298	+20.9%

Source: Censuses

== Transport ==
The D7 motorway from Prague to Chomutov runs through the municipality.

Středokluky is located on the railway lines of local importance Prague–Středokluky and Hostivice–Noutonice.

== Sights ==
The main landmark of Středokluky is the Church of Saint Procopius. It was built in the Baroque style in 1716–1721 according to the design by František Maxmilián Kaňka.
