= Bořanovice =

- Municipality
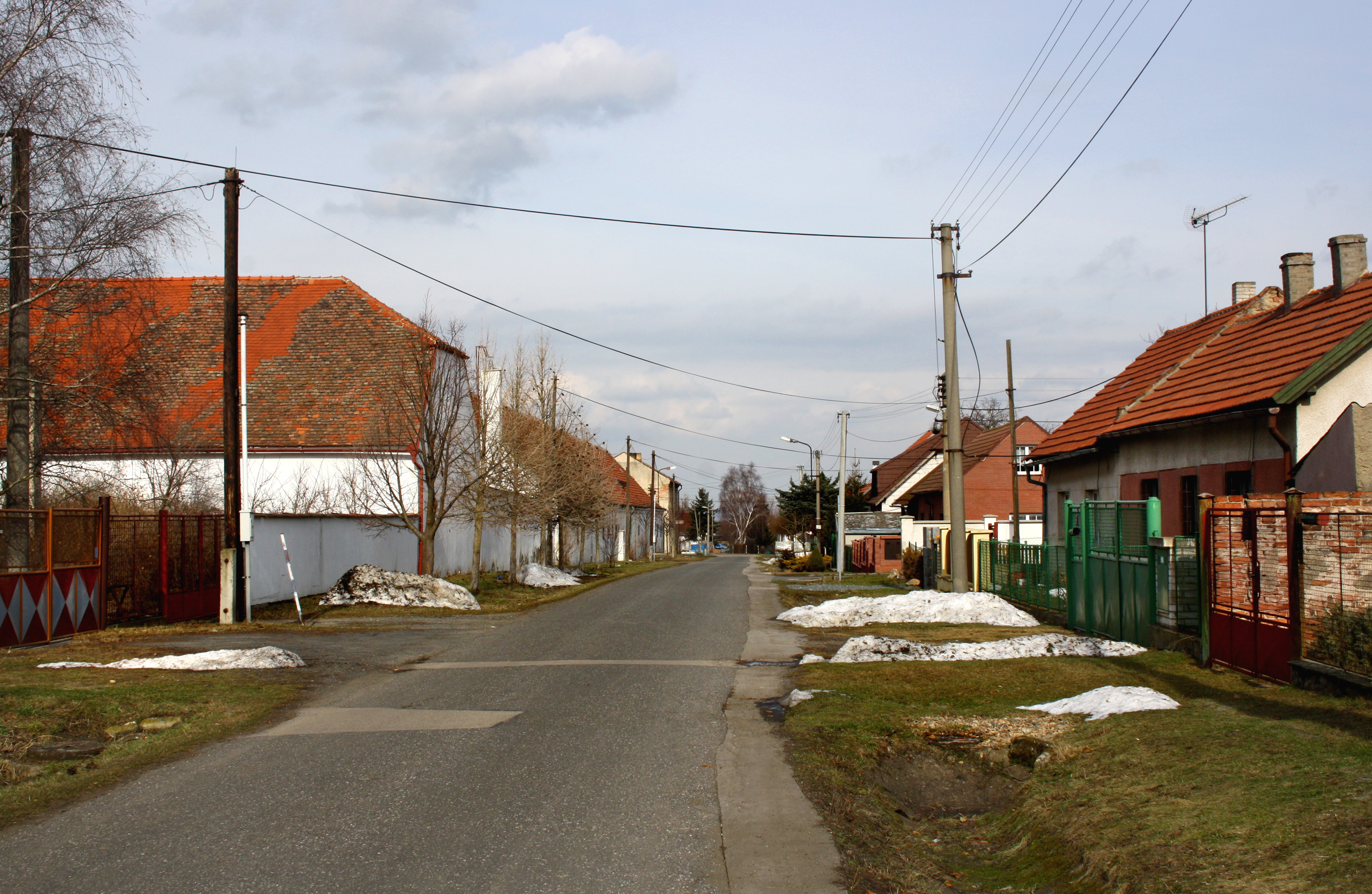
- Pivovarská street

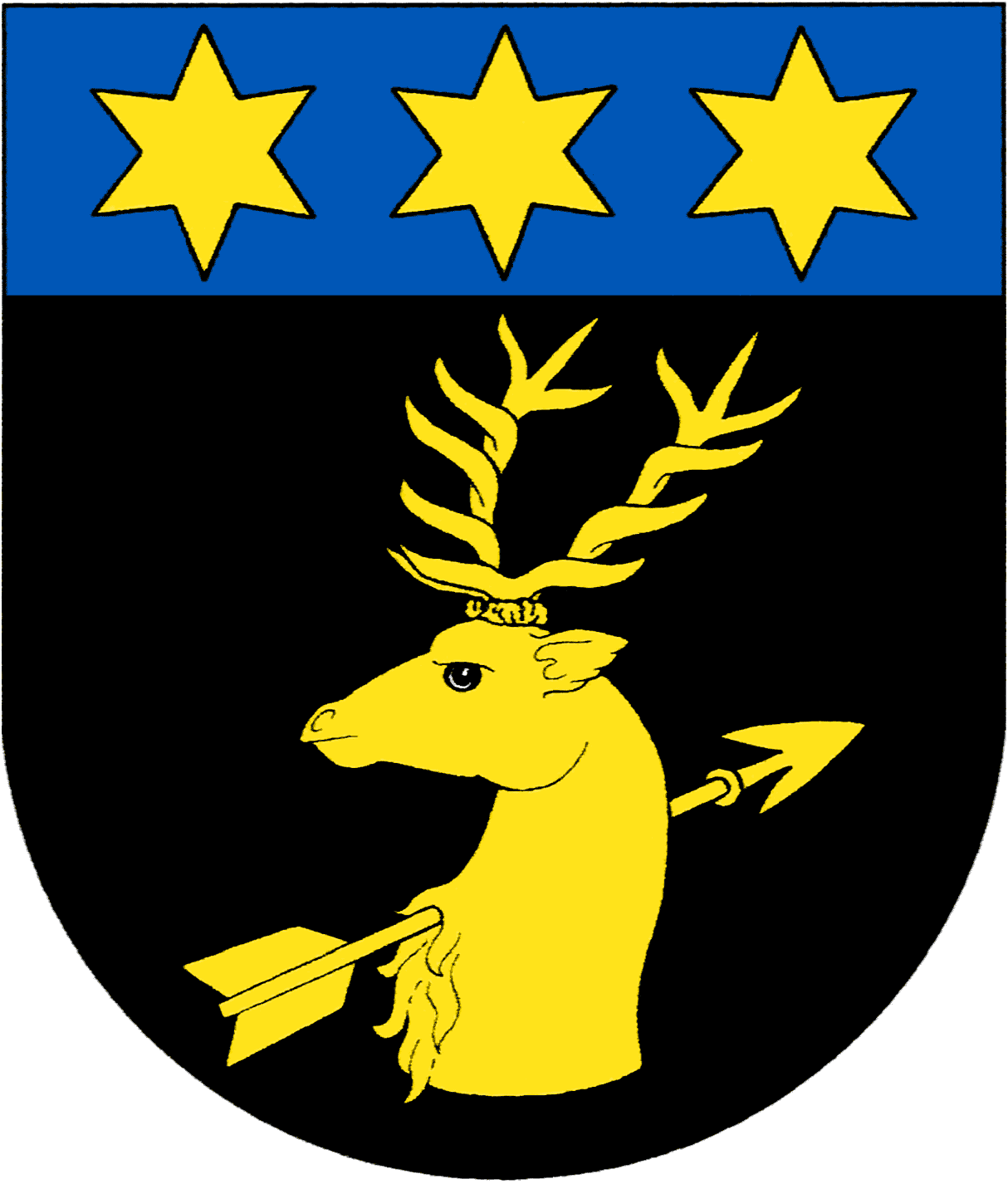
- Flag Coat of arms

- Location in the Czech Republic
- Coordinates: 50°10′42″N 14°28′44″E
- Country: Czech Republic
- Region: Central Bohemian
- District: Prague-East
- First mentioned: 1227

Area
  - Total: 5.35 km^{2} (2.07 sq mi)
- Elevation: 249 m (817 ft)

Population (2026-01-01)
  - Total: 986
  - Density: 184/km^{2} (477/sq mi)
- Time zone: UTC+1 (CET)
  - Summer (DST): UTC+2 (CEST)
- Postal code: 250 65
- Website: www.boranovice.cz

Bořanovice is a municipality and village in Prague-East District in the Central Bohemian Region of the Czech Republic. It has about 1,000 inhabitants.

== Administrative division ==
Bořanovice consists of two municipal parts (in brackets population according to the 2021 census):

- Bořanovice (553)
- Pakoměřice (561)

== Etymology ==
The name is derived from the personal name Bořan (a shortened form of Bořivoj), meaning "the village of Bořan's people".

== Geography ==
Bořanovice is located about 6 kilometres (4 mi) north of Prague. It lies mostly in an agricultural landscape of the Central Elbe Table, but the western part of the municipal territory extends into the Prague Plateau.

== History ==
The first written mention of Bořanovice is from 1227. Pakoměřice was first documented in 1352, when the church was mentioned.

== Demographics ==
Historical population

Year	Pop.	±%
1869	367	—
1880	491	+33.8%
1890	509	+3.7%
1900	486	−4.5%
1910	508	+4.5%

Year	Pop.	±%
1921	485	−4.5%
1930	565	+16.5%
1950	514	−9.0%
1961	579	+12.6%
1970	511	−11.7%

Year	Pop.	±%
1980	532	+4.1%
1991	410	−22.9%
2001	466	+13.7%
2011	820	+76.0%
2021	1,114	+35.9%

Source: Censuses

== Transport ==
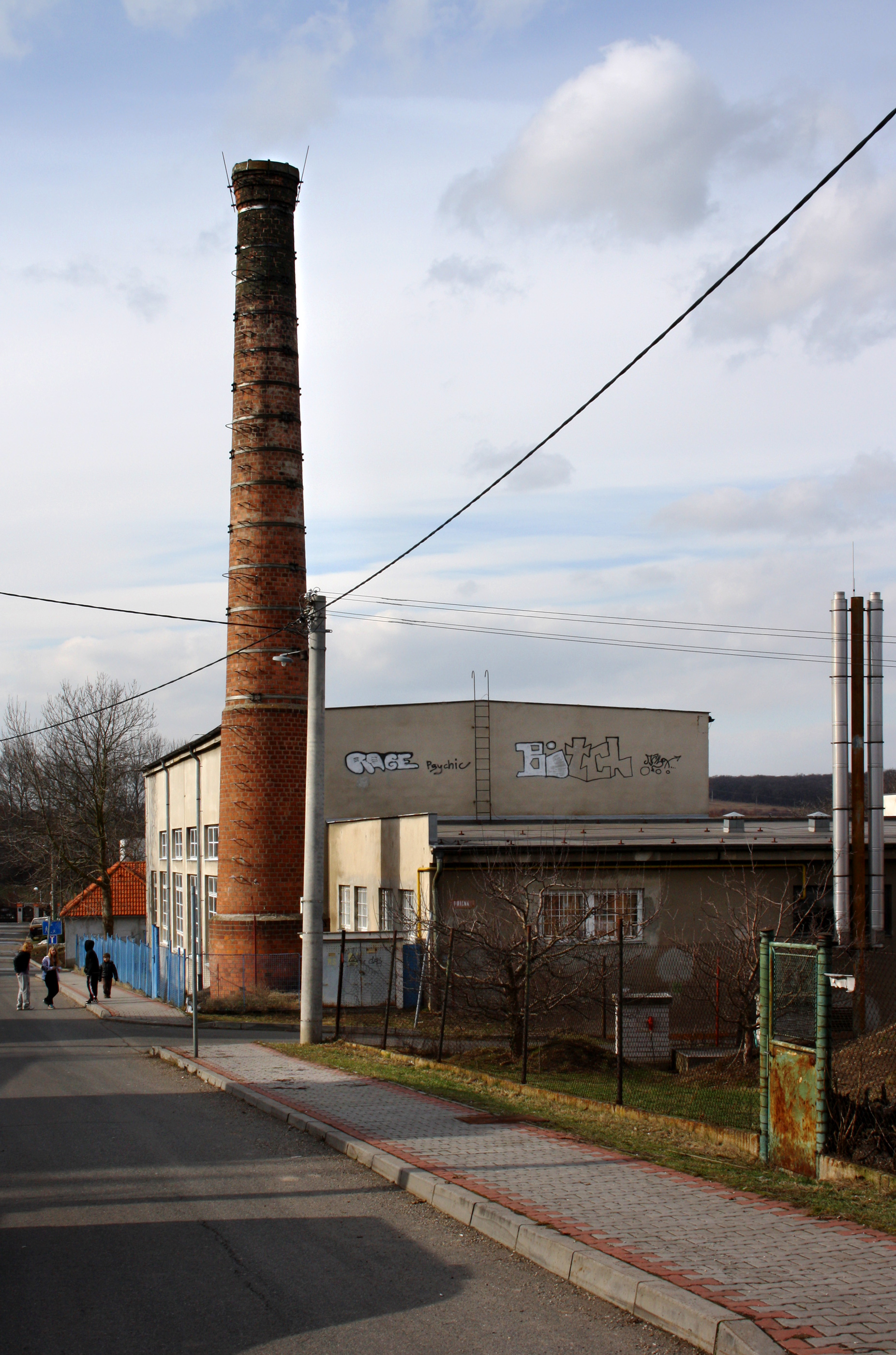
Former brewery

The I/9 road (which connects the D8 motorway with Česká Lípa and the Czech–German border) runs through the municipality.

== Sights ==
In Pakoměřice is the complex of a rural castle with the Church of the Nativity of the Virgin Mary. The church was originally a Gothic building, rebuilt in the Baroque style. The castle was originally a medieval fortress which underwent Renaissance, Baroque and Neoclassical modifications.
