= Zvole (Prague-West District) =

- Municipality
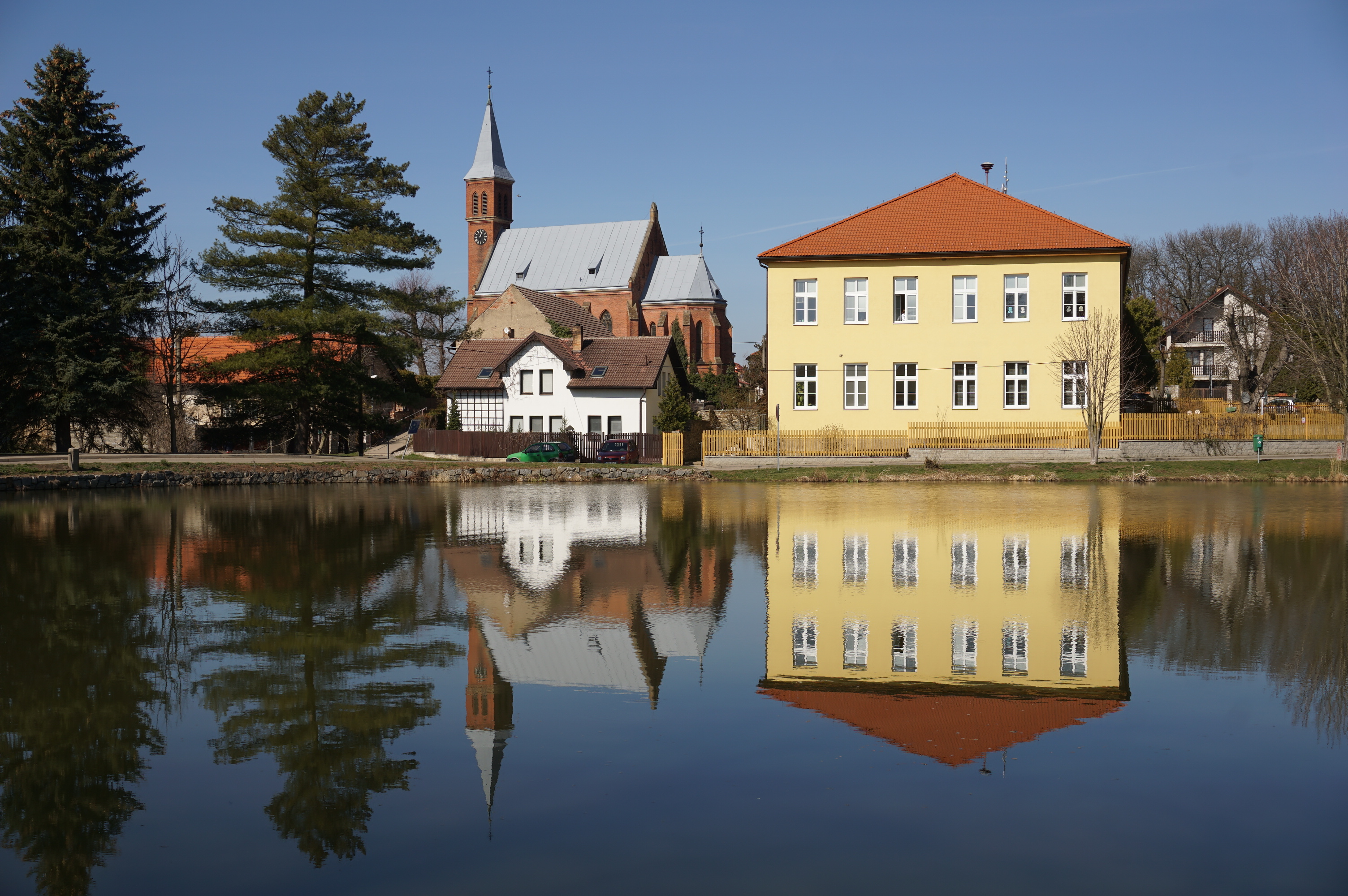
- Centre of Zvole

- Flag Coat of arms

- Location in the Czech Republic
- Coordinates: 49°56′5″N 14°25′4″E
- Country: Czech Republic
- Region: Central Bohemian
- District: Prague-West
- First mentioned: 1310

Area
  - Total: 7.26 km^{2} (2.80 sq mi)
- Elevation: 366 m (1,201 ft)

Population (2026-01-01)
  - Total: 1,985
  - Density: 273/km^{2} (708/sq mi)
- Time zone: UTC+1 (CET)
  - Summer (DST): UTC+2 (CEST)
- Postal code: 252 45
- Website: www.zvole.info

Zvole is a municipality and village in Prague-West District in the Central Bohemian Region of the Czech Republic. It has about 2,000 inhabitants.

== Administrative division ==
Zvole consists of two municipal parts (in brackets population according to the 2021 census):

- Zvole (1,794)
- Černíky (196)

== Etymology ==
The old Czech legal term zvóle referred to the right to use municipal property. The name of the village meant that all new settlers received this right.

== Geography ==
Zvole is located about 11 kilometres (7 mi) south of Prague. It lies in the Prague Plateau. The highest point is at 379 m (1,243 ft) above sea level. The municipality is situated on an elevated plateau above the Vltava River, which flows along the northwestern municipal border, just outside the municipality. The brook Zvolský potok originates in the centre of the Zvole village and flows to the Vltava. Two small fishponds are built at the spring of this brook.

The rocks of the Vltava canyon and their surroundings in the northwestern part of the Zvole territory are protected as the Zvolská homole Nature Monument. It has an area of 49.9 ha (123 acres). There are many endangered and protected species of plants and animals here, typical of the habitats of rocky cliffs, steppes and deciduous groves.

== History ==
The first written mention of Zvole is from 1310. The village was founded between 1260 and 1272. From 1356 to 1420, Zvole was owned by the Zbraslav Monastery. From 1486, the village belonged to the Dolní Břežany estate.

== Demographics ==
Historical population

Year	Pop.	±%
1869	286	—
1880	291	+1.7%
1890	297	+2.1%
1900	307	+3.4%
1910	325	+5.9%

Year	Pop.	±%
1921	315	−3.1%
1930	381	+21.0%
1950	455	+19.4%
1961	455	+0.0%
1970	425	−6.6%

Year	Pop.	±%
1980	517	+21.6%
1991	553	+7.0%
2001	883	+59.7%
2011	1,736	+96.6%
2021	1,990	+14.6%

Source: Censuses

== Transport ==
There are no railways or major roads passing through the municipality.

== Sights ==
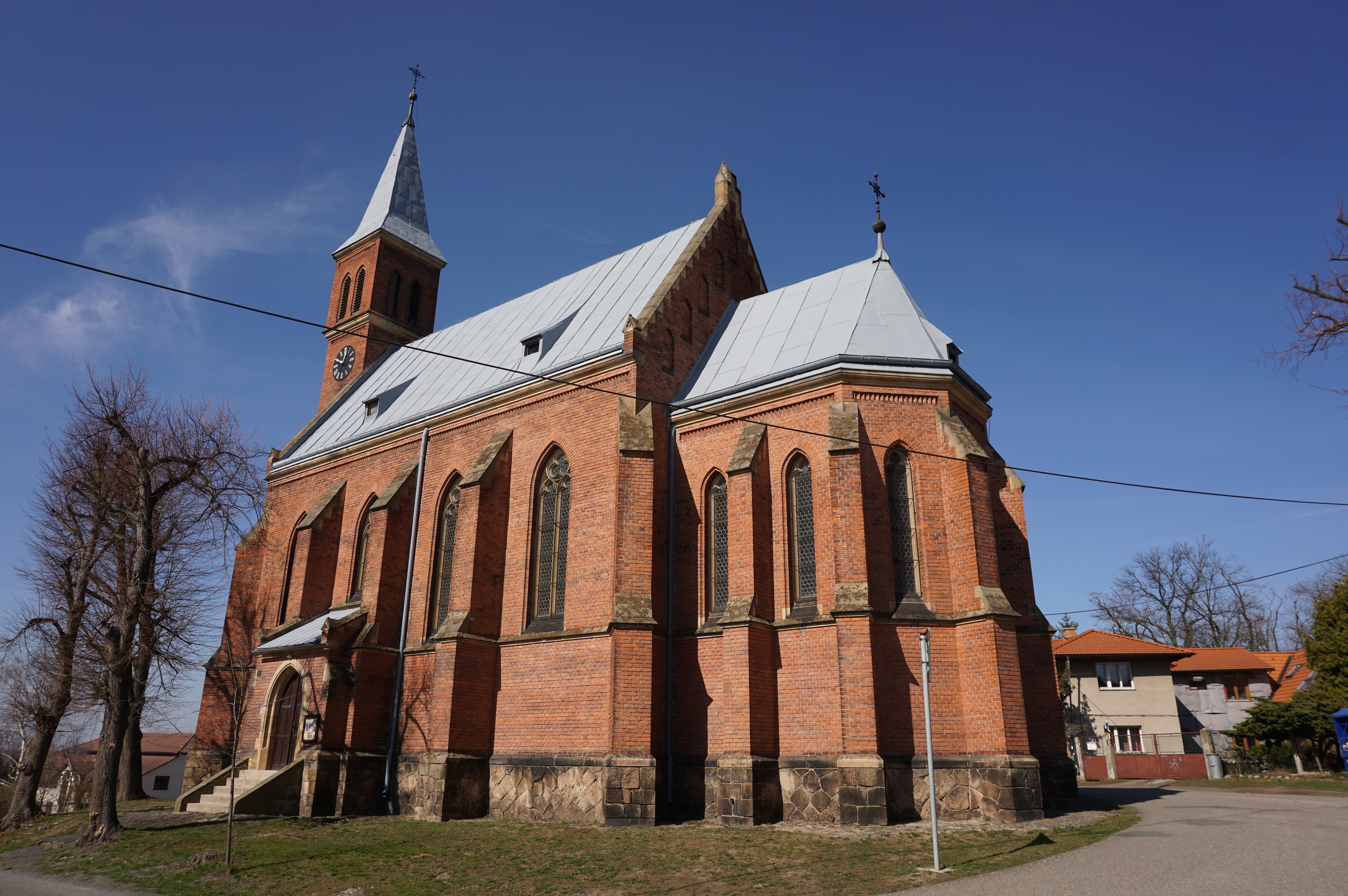
Church of Saint Margaret

The main landmark of Zvole is the Church of Saint Margaret. It was built in the neo-Gothic style in 1892–1894. It was built according to the design by Josef Mocker, on the site of an old Gothic church.

South pole of Prague is located on the border between Prague and Zvole.
