= Hostivice =

- Town
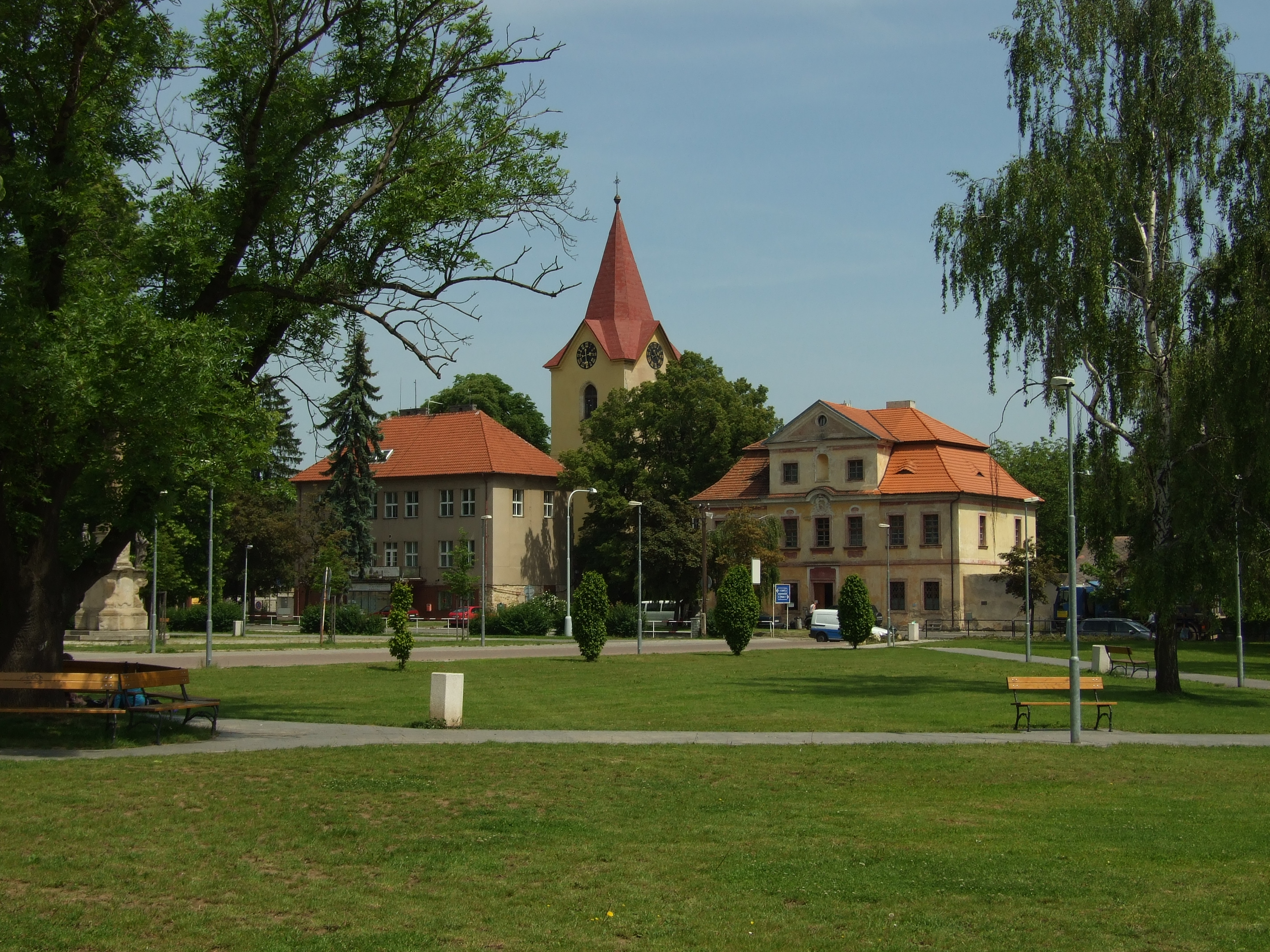
- Town square

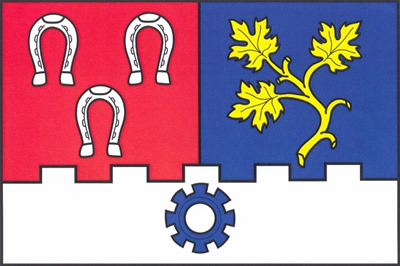
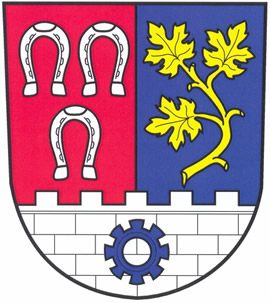
- Flag Coat of arms

- Location in the Czech Republic
- Coordinates: 50°4′53″N 14°15′9″E
- Country: Czech Republic
- Region: Central Bohemian
- District: Prague-West
- First mentioned: 1277

Government
  - Mayor: Klára Čápová

Area
  - Total: 14.47 km^{2} (5.59 sq mi)
- Elevation: 341 m (1,119 ft)

Population (2026-01-01)
  - Total: 9,266
  - Density: 640.4/km^{2} (1,659/sq mi)
- Time zone: UTC+1 (CET)
  - Summer (DST): UTC+2 (CEST)
- Postal code: 253 01
- Website: www.hostivice-mesto.cz

Hostivice (Czech pronunciation: [ˈɦoscɪvɪtsɛ]) is a town in Prague-West District in the Central Bohemian Region of the Czech Republic. It has about 9,300 inhabitants. The town is located near Prague, on the stream Litovický potok in the Prague Plateau.

== Administrative division ==
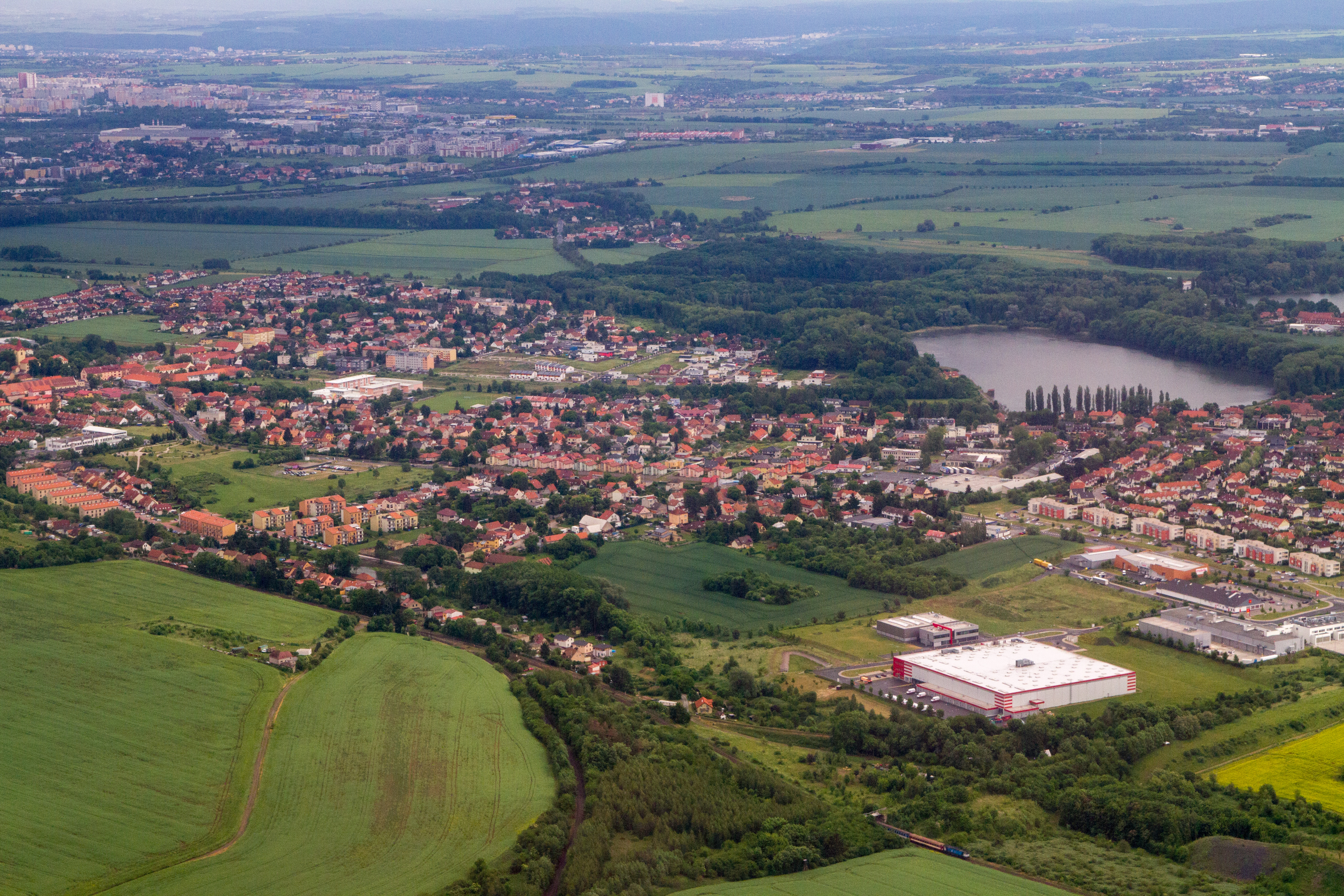
Aerial view

Hostivice consists of two municipal parts (in brackets population according to the 2021 census):

- Hostivice (9,655)
- Břve (132)

== Etymology ==
The name was derived from the personal name Hostivít, meaning "Hostivít's village".

== Geography ==
Hostivice is located west of Prague, in its immediate vicinity. It lies in a flat agricultural landscape in the Prague Plateau. The stream Litovický potok flows through the town and supplies there a system of three fishponds, protected as the Hostivice Ponds Nature Monument.

== History ==
Břve is the oldest part of the town, first mentioned in 1184. The first written mention of Hostivice is from 1277.

The current appearance of the town was created by merging and growing four separate villages: Hostivice, Litovice, Jeneček and Břve. In 1849, Litovice, Jeneček and Břve merged to create one municipality of Litovice, and in 1950, it was merged with Hostivice. In 1978, Hostivice became a town.

== Demographics ==
Historical population

Year	Pop.	±%
1869	1,661	—
1880	2,009	+21.0%
1890	2,267	+12.8%
1900	2,291	+1.1%
1910	2,564	+11.9%

Year	Pop.	±%
1921	2,802	+9.3%
1930	4,248	+51.6%
1950	4,113	−3.2%
1961	4,327	+5.2%
1970	4,157	−3.9%

Year	Pop.	±%
1980	4,310	+3.7%
1991	4,021	−6.7%
2001	4,586	+14.1%
2011	8,224	+79.3%
2021	9,787	+19.0%

Source: Censuses

== Transport ==
Hostivice lies close to Václav Havel Airport Prague. The D6 motorway from Prague to Karlovy Vary runs next to the town.

Hostivice is located on the railway lines Prague–Kladno and Prague–Rudná.

== Sights ==
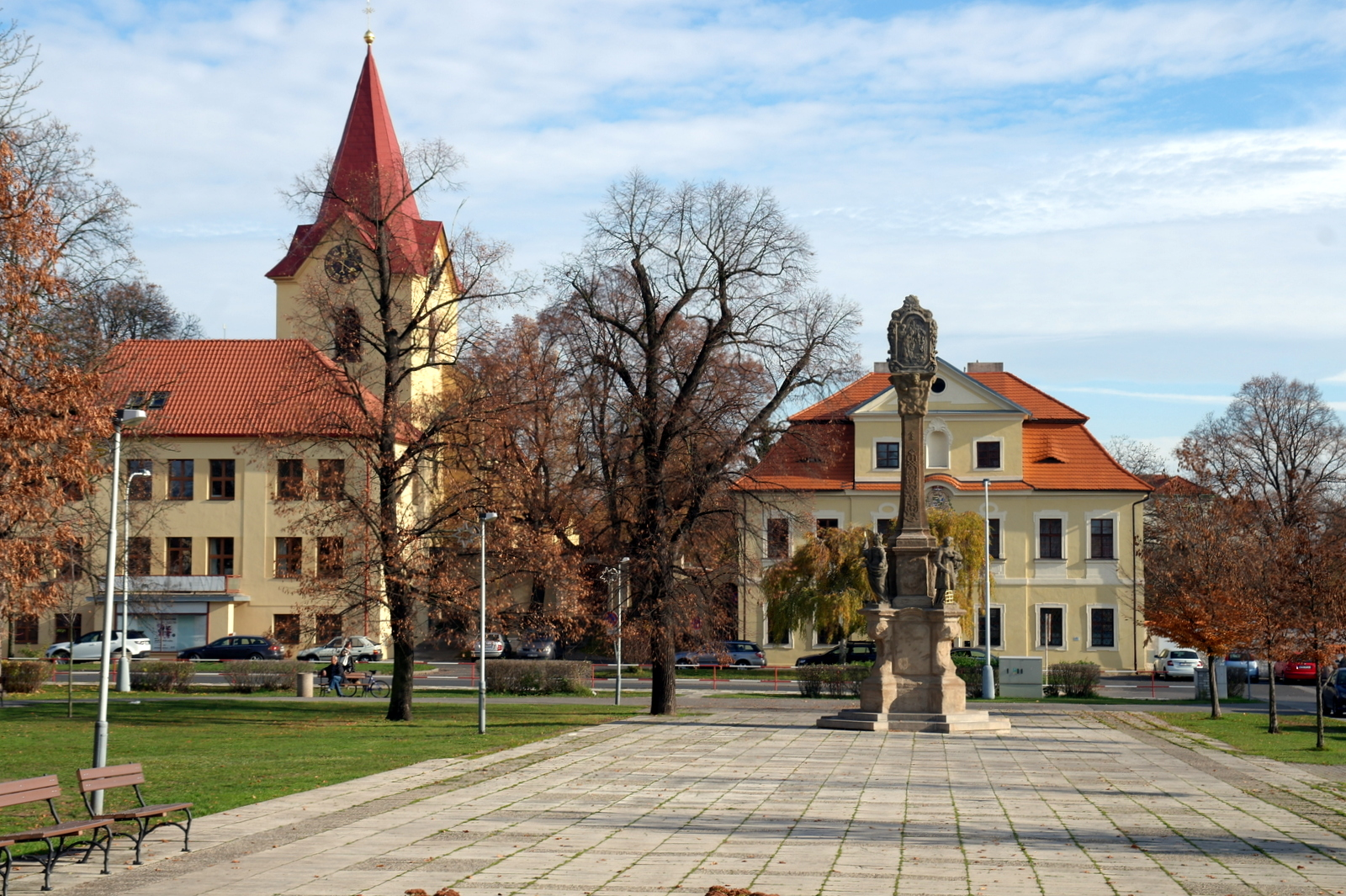
Marian column and rectory on the town square; church tower on the left

The main landmars of the town are the church and castle, located by the town square. The Hostivice Castle was built in the early Baroque style in 1689–1697 for Countess Caretto-Millesimo. The castle was completely rebuilt in 1732–1734, during the rule of Anna Maria Franziska of Saxe-Lauenburg. She also had built a large two-storey granary next to the castle. Today the castle serves as the town hall.

The Church of Saint James the Great was built in the Gothic style in the 13th or 14th century. In the 18th and 19th centuries, it was modified and extended into its current form.

In the centre of the town square is a Baroque Marian column. It dates from 1734.

== Notable people ==
- David Rath (born 1965), politician; lives here
