= Lichoceves =

- Municipality
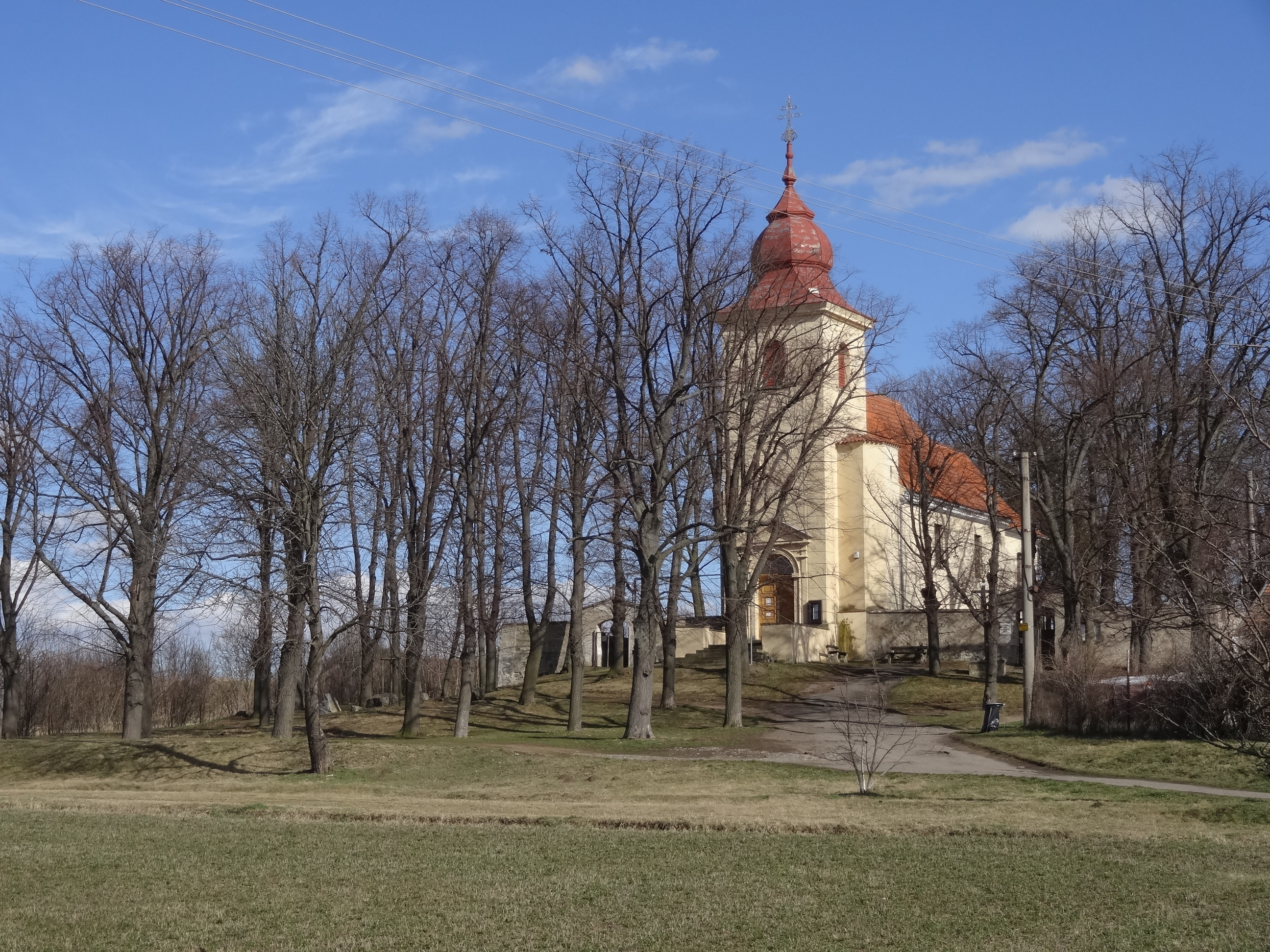
- Church of Saint John the Baptist

- Flag Coat of arms

- Location in the Czech Republic
- Coordinates: 50°9′10″N 14°17′4″E
- Country: Czech Republic
- Region: Central Bohemian
- District: Prague-West
- First mentioned: 1228

Area
  - Total: 5.18 km^{2} (2.00 sq mi)
- Elevation: 307 m (1,007 ft)

Population (2026-01-01)
  - Total: 406
  - Density: 78.4/km^{2} (203/sq mi)
- Time zone: UTC+1 (CET)
  - Summer (DST): UTC+2 (CEST)
- Postal code: 252 64
- Website: www.lichoceves.cz

Lichoceves (Czech pronunciation: [ˈlɪxotsɛvɛs]) is a municipality and village in Prague-West District in the Central Bohemian Region of the Czech Republic. It has about 400 inhabitants.

== Administrative division ==
Lichoceves consists of two municipal parts (in brackets population according to the 2021 census):

- Lichoceves (98)
- Noutonice (343)

== History ==
The first written mention of Lichoceves is from 1228.

== Demographics ==
Historical population
Year	Pop.	±%
1869	446	—
1880	477	+7.0%
1890	487	+2.1%
1900	454	−6.8%
1910	479	+5.5%
1921	445	−7.1%
1930	406	−8.8%
1950	323	−20.4%
1961	379	+17.3%
1970	327	−13.7%
1980	283	−13.5%
1991	242	−14.5%
2001	205	−15.3%
2011	374	+82.4%
2021	441	+17.9%
Source: Censuses
