= Malé Přítočno =

- Municipality
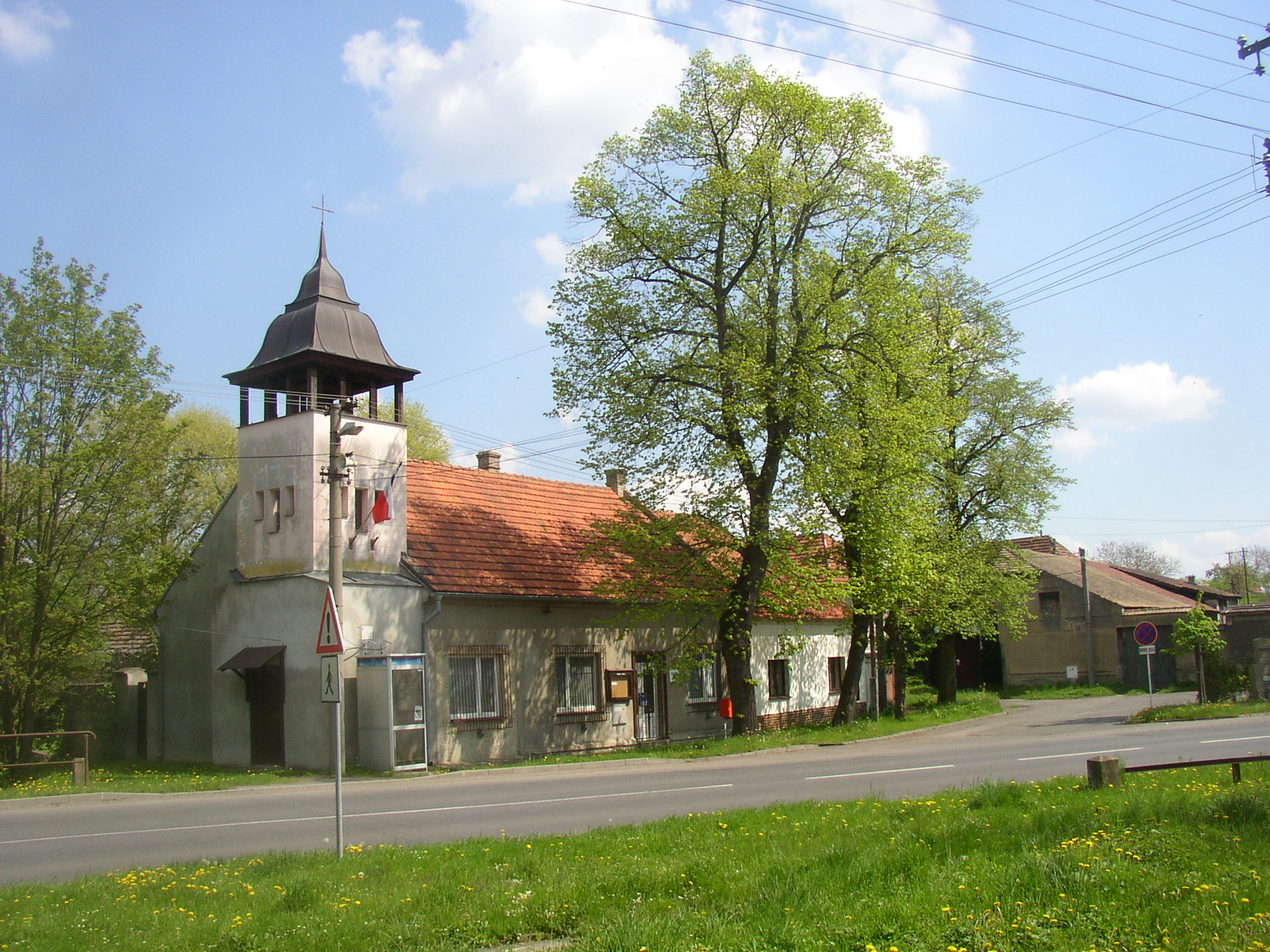
- Municipal office

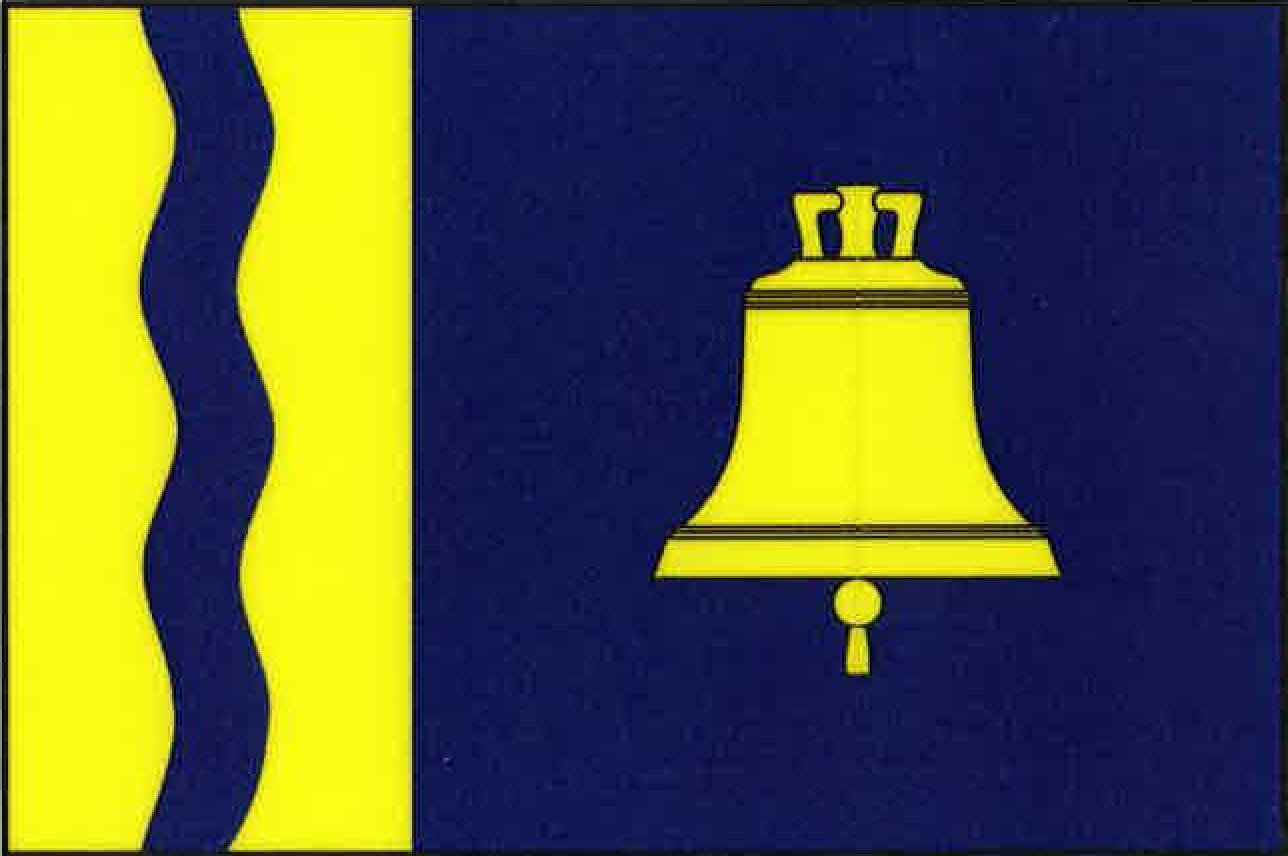
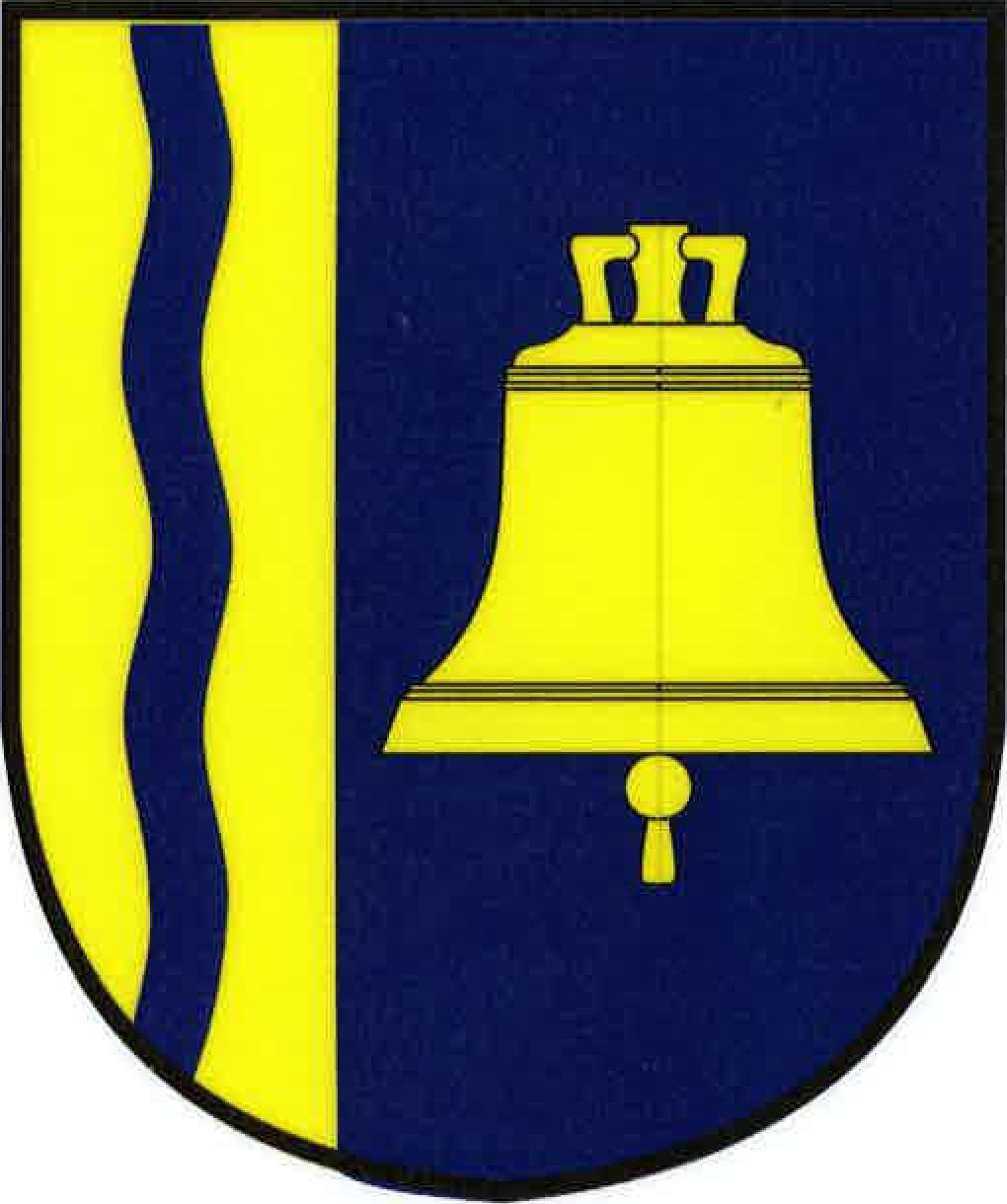
- Flag Coat of arms

- Location in the Czech Republic
- Coordinates: 50°6′28″N 14°8′8″E
- Country: Czech Republic
- Region: Central Bohemian
- District: Kladno
- First mentioned: 1354

Area
  - Total: 1.85 km^{2} (0.71 sq mi)
- Elevation: 390 m (1,280 ft)

Population (2026-01-01)
  - Total: 283
  - Density: 153/km^{2} (396/sq mi)
- Time zone: UTC+1 (CET)
  - Summer (DST): UTC+2 (CEST)
- Postal code: 273 51
- Website: www.malepritocno.cz

Malé Přítočno is a municipality and village in Kladno District in the Central Bohemian Region of the Czech Republic. It has about 300 inhabitants.

== Etymology ==
The initial name of the village was Přietočeň. The name was derived from the Czech word přítok ('tributary'), referring to a court located above the stream Zákolanský potok (here called Dolanský potok), which is a tributary of the Elbe River. By 1397 at the latest, two village were distinguished: Malé Přítočno and Velké Přítočno ('small Přítočno' and 'great Přítočno').

== Geography ==
Malé Přítočno is located about 3 kilometres (2 mi) south of Kladno and 16 km (10 mi) west of Prague. It lies in a predominantly flat agricultural landscape in the Prague Plateau. The highest point is at 411 m (1,348 ft) above sea level.

== History ==
The first written mention of Malé Přítočno is from 1354.

== Demographics ==
Historical population

| Year | Pop. | ±% |
|---|---|---|
| 1869 | 161 | — |
| 1880 | 197 | +22.4% |
| 1890 | 212 | +7.6% |
| 1900 | 366 | +72.6% |
| 1910 | 410 | +12.0% |

| Year | Pop. | ±% |
|---|---|---|
| 1921 | 372 | −9.3% |
| 1930 | 415 | +11.6% |
| 1950 | 406 | −2.2% |
| 1961 | 396 | −2.5% |
| 1970 | 361 | −8.8% |

| Year | Pop. | ±% |
|---|---|---|
| 1980 | 337 | −6.6% |
| 1991 | 260 | −22.8% |
| 2001 | 229 | −11.9% |
| 2011 | 242 | +5.7% |
| 2021 | 267 | +10.3% |

Source: Censuses

== Transport ==
The D6 motorway from Prague to Karlovy Vary passes through the southern part of the municipality. The I/61 road, which runs through the village, splits from the D6 motorway and connects it with Kladno and with the D7 motorway.

In the municipality is the train station called Unhošť, after the neighbouring town of Unhošť. It is located on the railway line Prague–Kralupy nad Vltavou via Kladno.

== Sights ==
There are no protected cultural monuments in the municipality.
