= Velké Přítočno =

- Municipality
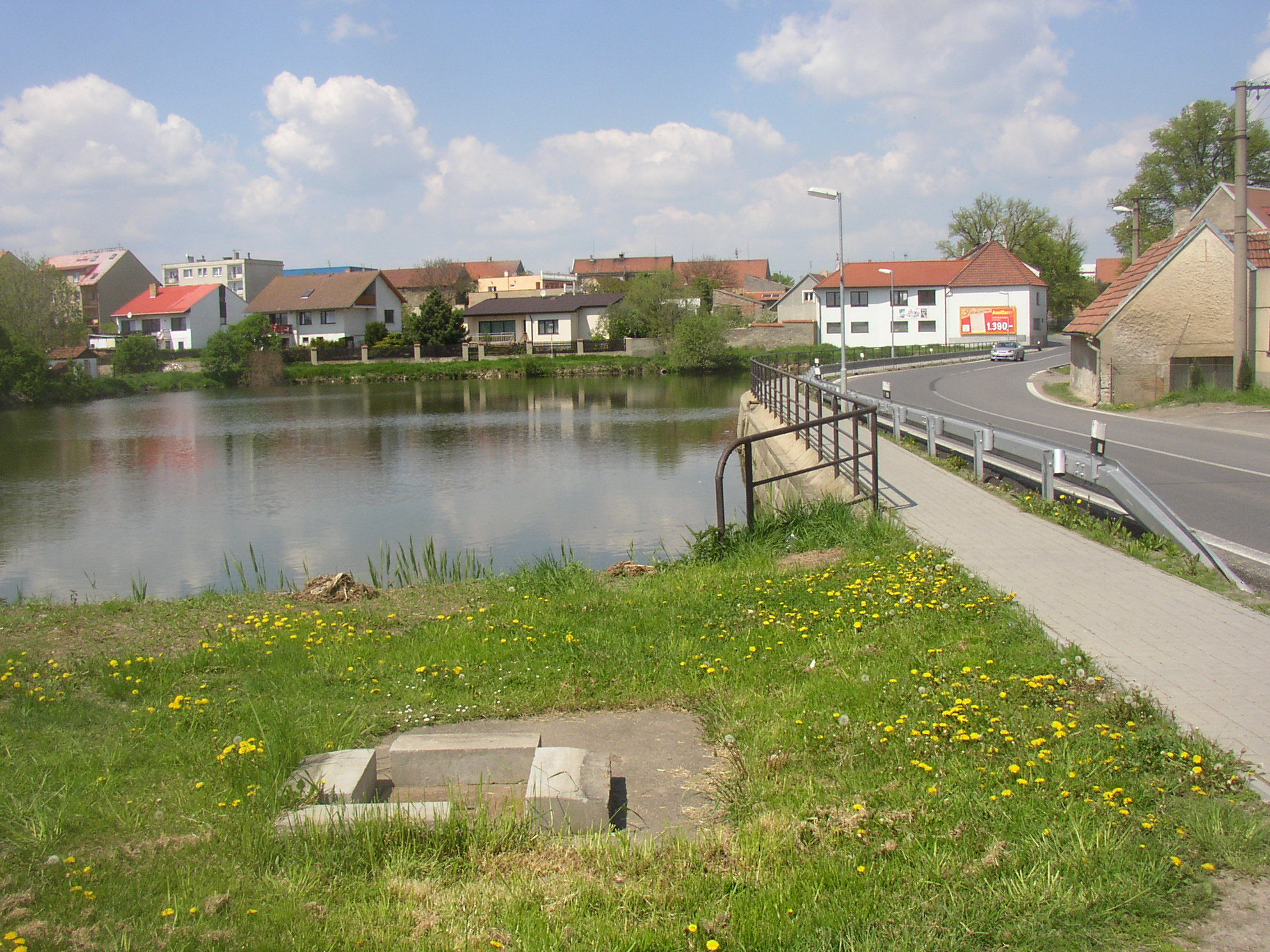
- Main street and a fishpond

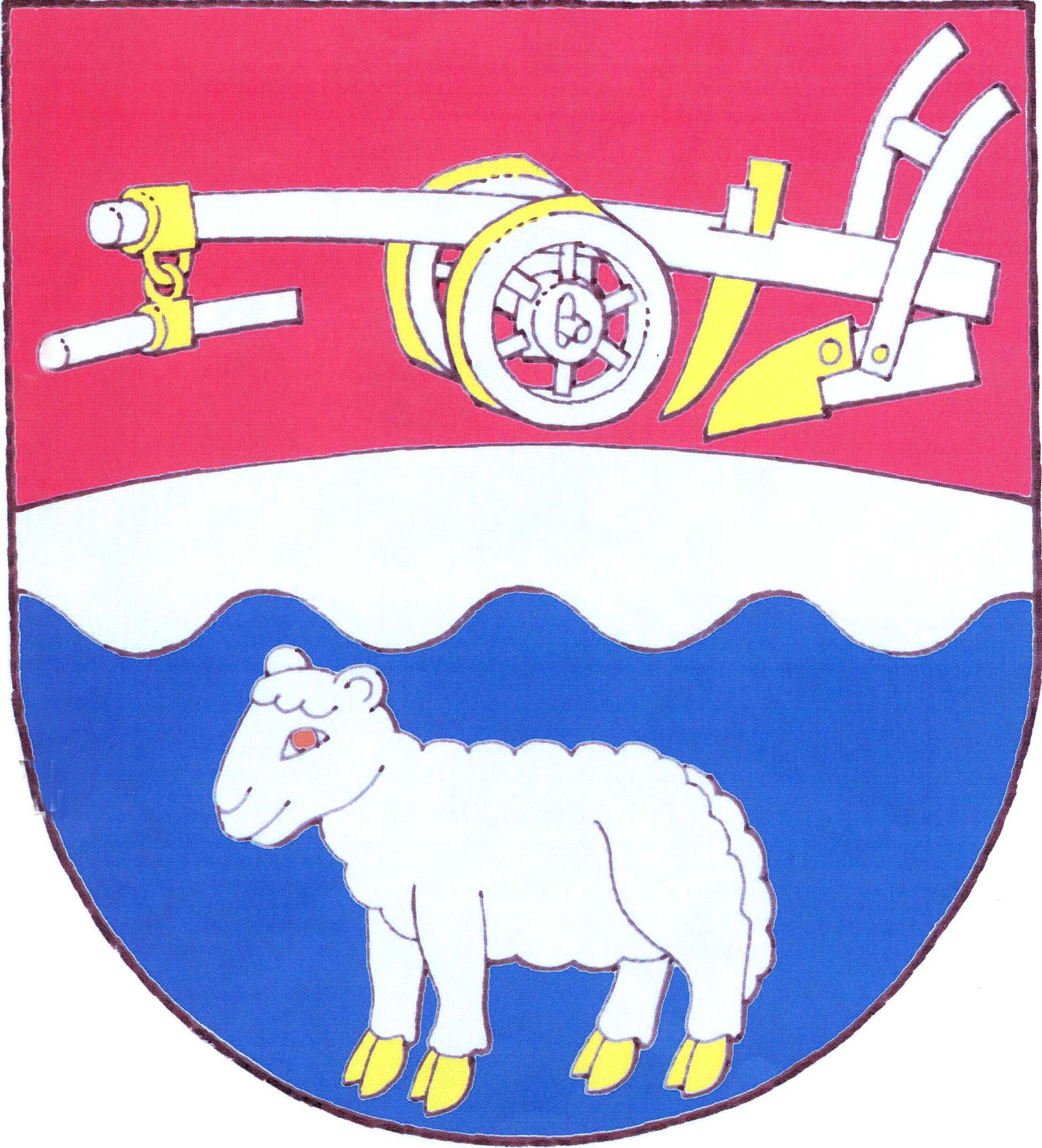
- Flag Coat of arms

- Location in the Czech Republic
- Coordinates: 50°7′0″N 14°7′42″E
- Country: Czech Republic
- Region: Central Bohemian
- District: Kladno
- First mentioned: 1354

Area
  - Total: 2.41 km^{2} (0.93 sq mi)
- Elevation: 391 m (1,283 ft)

Population (2026-01-01)
  - Total: 1,117
  - Density: 463/km^{2} (1,200/sq mi)
- Time zone: UTC+1 (CET)
  - Summer (DST): UTC+2 (CEST)
- Postal code: 273 51
- Website: www.velkepritocno.cz

Velké Přítočno is a municipality and village in Kladno District in the Central Bohemian Region of the Czech Republic. It has about 1,100 inhabitants.

== Etymology ==
The initial name of the village was Přietočeň. The name was derived from the Czech word přítok ('tributary'), referring to a court located above the stream Zákolanský potok, which is a tributary of the Elbe River. From 1397 at the latest, two villages were distinguished: Velké Přítočno and Malé Přítočno ('great Přítočno' and 'small Přítočno').

== Geography ==
Velké Přítočno is located about 2 kilometres (1 mi) south of Kladno and 16 km (10 mi) west of Prague. It lies in a predominantly flat agricultural landscape in the Prague Plateau. The highest point is at 430 m (1,410 ft) above sea level. The stream Zákolanský potok (here called Dolanský potok) originates in the municipal territory.

Velké Přítočno is reported as the site with the lowest annual precipitation in the Czech Republic. In 1933, the annual total precipitation was 247 mm.

== History ==
The first written mention of Velké Přítočno is from 1354.

== Demographics ==
Historical population

Year	Pop.	±%
1869	461	—
1880	590	+28.0%
1890	622	+5.4%
1900	780	+25.4%
1910	859	+10.1%

Year	Pop.	±%
1921	886	+3.1%
1930	977	+10.3%
1950	722	−26.1%
1961	916	+26.9%
1970	843	−8.0%

Year	Pop.	±%
1980	730	−13.4%
1991	665	−8.9%
2001	769	+15.6%
2011	909	+18.2%
2021	997	+9.7%

Source: Censuses

== Transport ==
The I/61 road, which connects the D6 and D7 motorways via Kladno, runs through Velké Přítočno.

== Sights ==
There are no protected cultural monuments in the municipality.

== Notable people ==
- Jaroslav Burgr (1906–1986), footballer
