= Stehelčeves =

- Municipality
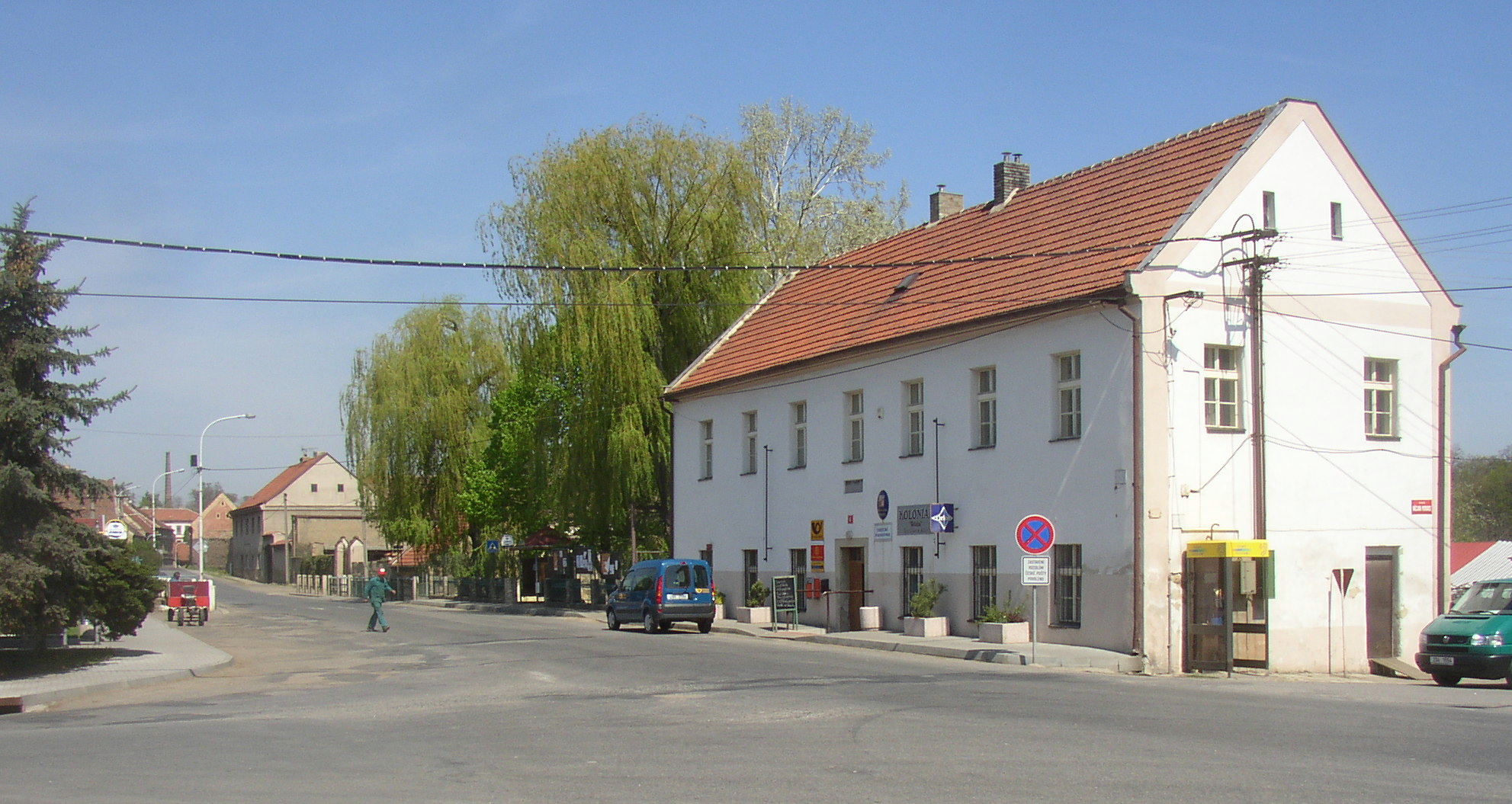
- Municipal office

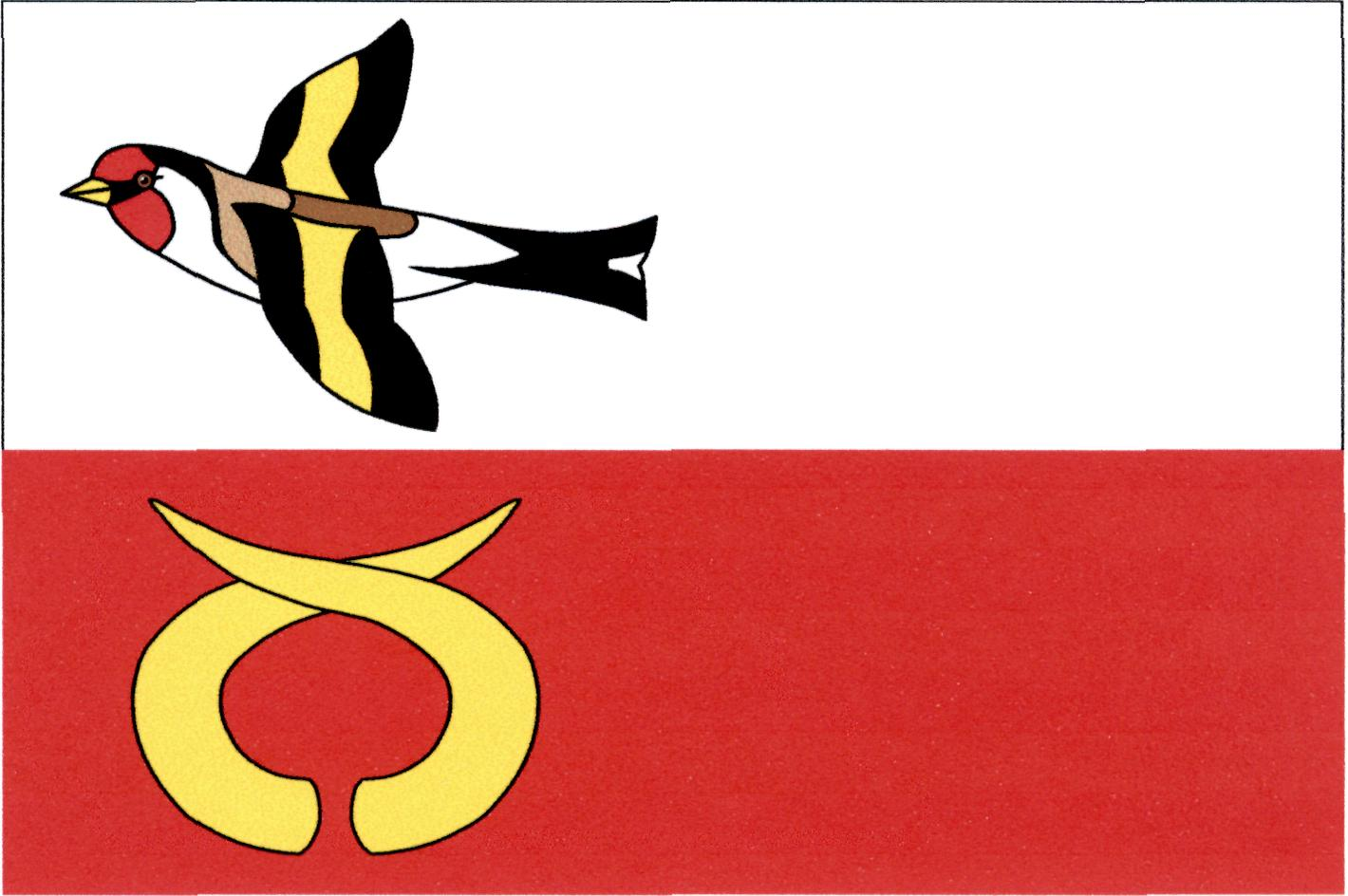
- Flag Coat of arms

- Location in the Czech Republic
- Coordinates: 50°10′18″N 14°11′27″E
- Country: Czech Republic
- Region: Central Bohemian
- District: Kladno
- First mentioned: 1316

Area
  - Total: 4.98 km^{2} (1.92 sq mi)
- Elevation: 276 m (906 ft)

Population (2026-01-01)
  - Total: 1,177
  - Density: 236/km^{2} (612/sq mi)
- Time zone: UTC+1 (CET)
  - Summer (DST): UTC+2 (CEST)
- Postal code: 273 42
- Website: www.obecstehelceves.cz

Stehelčeves is a municipality and village in Kladno District in the Central Bohemian Region of the Czech Republic. It has about 1,200 inhabitants.

== Etymology ==
The name is derived from the personal name Stehlec and the Czech word ves ('village'), so it means "Stehlec's village".

== Geography ==
Stehelčeves is located about 6 kilometres (4 mi) northeast of Kladno and 22 km (14 mi) northwest of Prague. It lies in the Prague Plateau. An artificial hill known as Buštěhrad slag heap is located in the southern part of the municipality. The stream Dřetovický potok flows through the municipality and supplies the fishpond Vrapický rybník.

== History ==
The first written mention of Stehelčeves is from 1316. At the beginning of the 16th century, the village was acquired by the Kolowrat family.

== Demographics ==
Historical population

Year	Pop.	±%
1869	765	—
1880	850	+11.1%
1890	872	+2.6%
1900	1,087	+24.7%
1910	1,196	+10.0%

Year	Pop.	±%
1921	1,117	−6.6%
1930	1,013	−9.3%
1950	789	−22.1%
1961	746	−5.4%
1970	624	−16.4%

Year	Pop.	±%
1980	568	−9.0%
1991	474	−16.5%
2001	504	+6.3%
2011	743	+47.4%
2021	1,140	+53.4%

Source: Censuses

== Transport ==
The D7 motorway runs along the eastern municipal border.

== Sights ==
The only protected cultural monument in the municipality are remnants of an eneolithic hillfort called Homolka, which have been archaeologically explored. A historical landmark of the village used to be a chapel from the first half of the 18th century, but it was destroyed by vandals in the 1950s.
