= Unhošť =

- Town
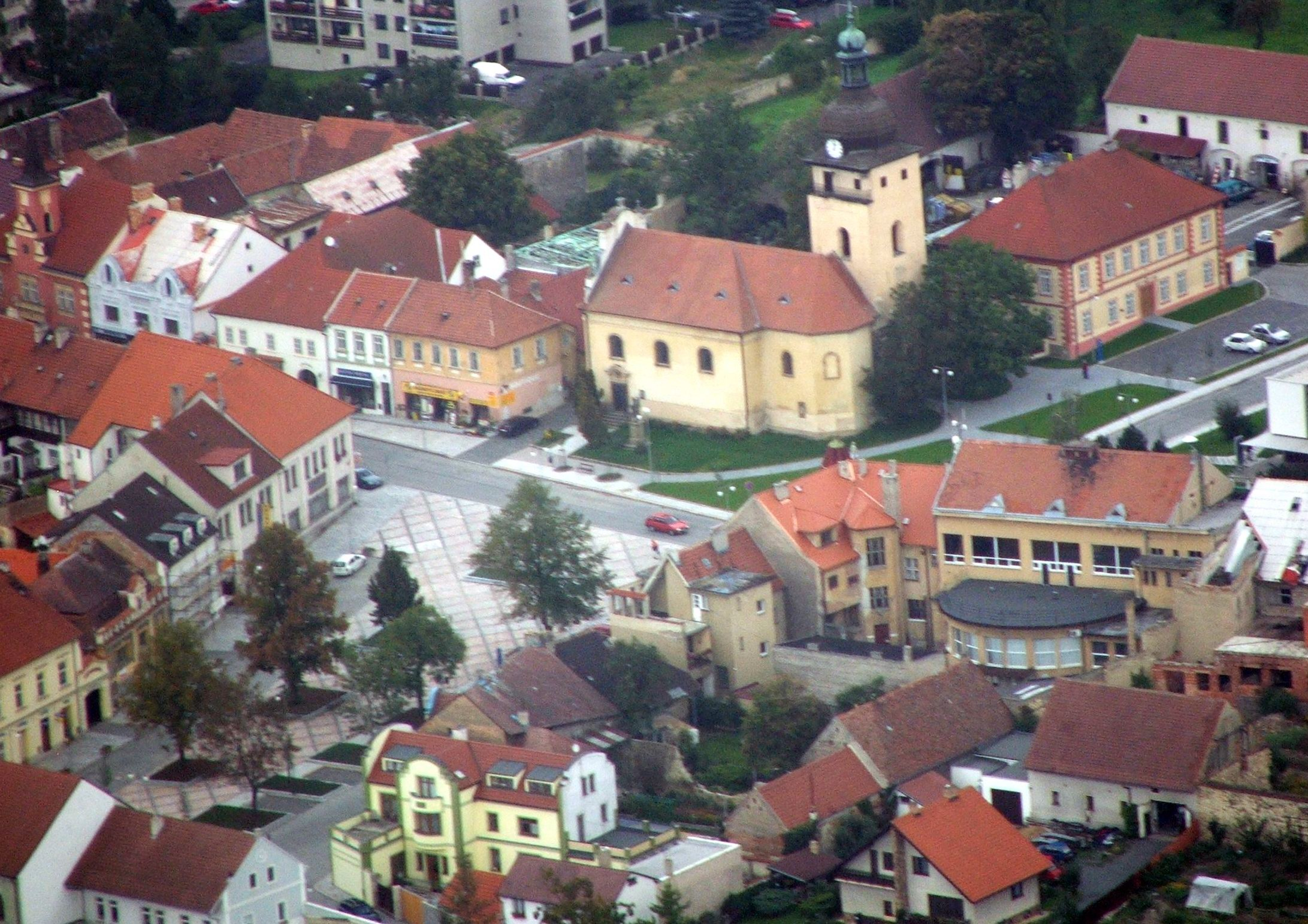
- Aerial view of the centre

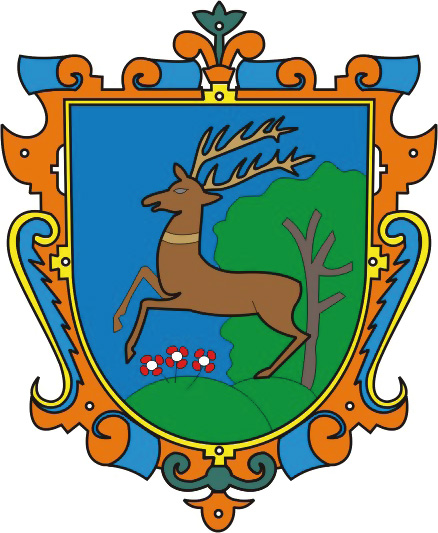
- Flag Coat of arms

- Location in the Czech Republic
- Coordinates: 50°4′47″N 14°7′15″E
- Country: Czech Republic
- Region: Central Bohemian
- District: Kladno
- First mentioned: 1284

Government
  - Mayor: Iveta Koulová (TOP 09)

Area
  - Total: 17.42 km^{2} (6.73 sq mi)
- Elevation: 387 m (1,270 ft)

Population (2026-01-01)
  - Total: 5,324
  - Density: 305.6/km^{2} (791.6/sq mi)
- Time zone: UTC+1 (CET)
  - Summer (DST): UTC+2 (CEST)
- Postal code: 273 51
- Website: www.muunhost.cz

Unhošť (Czech pronunciation: [ˈunɦoʃc]) is a town in Kladno District in the Central Bohemian Region of the Czech Republic. It has about 5,300 inhabitants. The historic town centre is well preserved and is protected as an urban monument zone.

== Etymology ==
The initial name of the settlement was Uněhošč. The name was derived from the personal name Uněhost, meaning "Uněhost's (court)".

== Geography ==
Unhošť is located about 6 kilometres (4 mi) south of Kladno and 13 km (8 mi) west of Prague. It lies mostly in the Křivoklát Highlands, only the eastern part of the municipal territory lies in the Prague Plateau. The highest point is at 415 m (1,362 ft) above sea level. The stream Černý potok originates in the municipal territory and supplies there a system of fishponds. The stream flows into the Loděnice River, which flows along the southern municipal border.

== History ==
The first written mention of Unhošť is from 1284. In 1329, it was referred to as a market town belonging to the Křivoklát estate. In 1489, King Vladislaus II granted Unhošť various privileges and thus accelerated its development. The development was interrupted by the Thirty Years' War, during which the market town was captured twice. Between 1783 and 1790, Unhošť was promoted to a town.

== Demographics ==
Historical population

Year	Pop.	±%
1869	2,184	—
1880	2,095	−4.1%
1890	2,464	+17.6%
1900	2,562	+4.0%
1910	2,724	+6.3%

Year	Pop.	±%
1921	2,633	−3.3%
1930	2,886	+9.6%
1950	3,181	+10.2%
1961	3,209	+0.9%
1970	3,531	+10.0%

Year	Pop.	±%
1980	3,590	+1.7%
1991	3,521	−1.9%
2001	3,566	+1.3%
2011	4,247	+19.1%
2021	5,161	+21.5%

Source: Censuses

== Transport ==
The D6 motorway from Prague to Karlovy Vary runs north of the town.

The train station called Unhošť, which serves the town, lies in the neighbouring municipality of Malé Přítočno. It is located on the railway line Prague–Kralupy nad Vltavou via Kladno.

== Sights ==
The main landmark of the historic centre and the oldest monument in the town is the Church of Saints Peter and Paul. Originally a Gothic building, it was built in the 14th century and first documented in 1329. At the beginning of the 18th century, the church was rebuilt into its current Baroque form.

== Notable people ==
- František Plesnivý (1845–1918), architect
- Karel Wellner (1875–1926), painter and illustrator
- František Pospíšil (born 1944), ice hockey player and coach
- Barbora Špotáková (born 1981), javelin thrower, Olympic winner; lives here
