= Tachlovice =

- Municipality
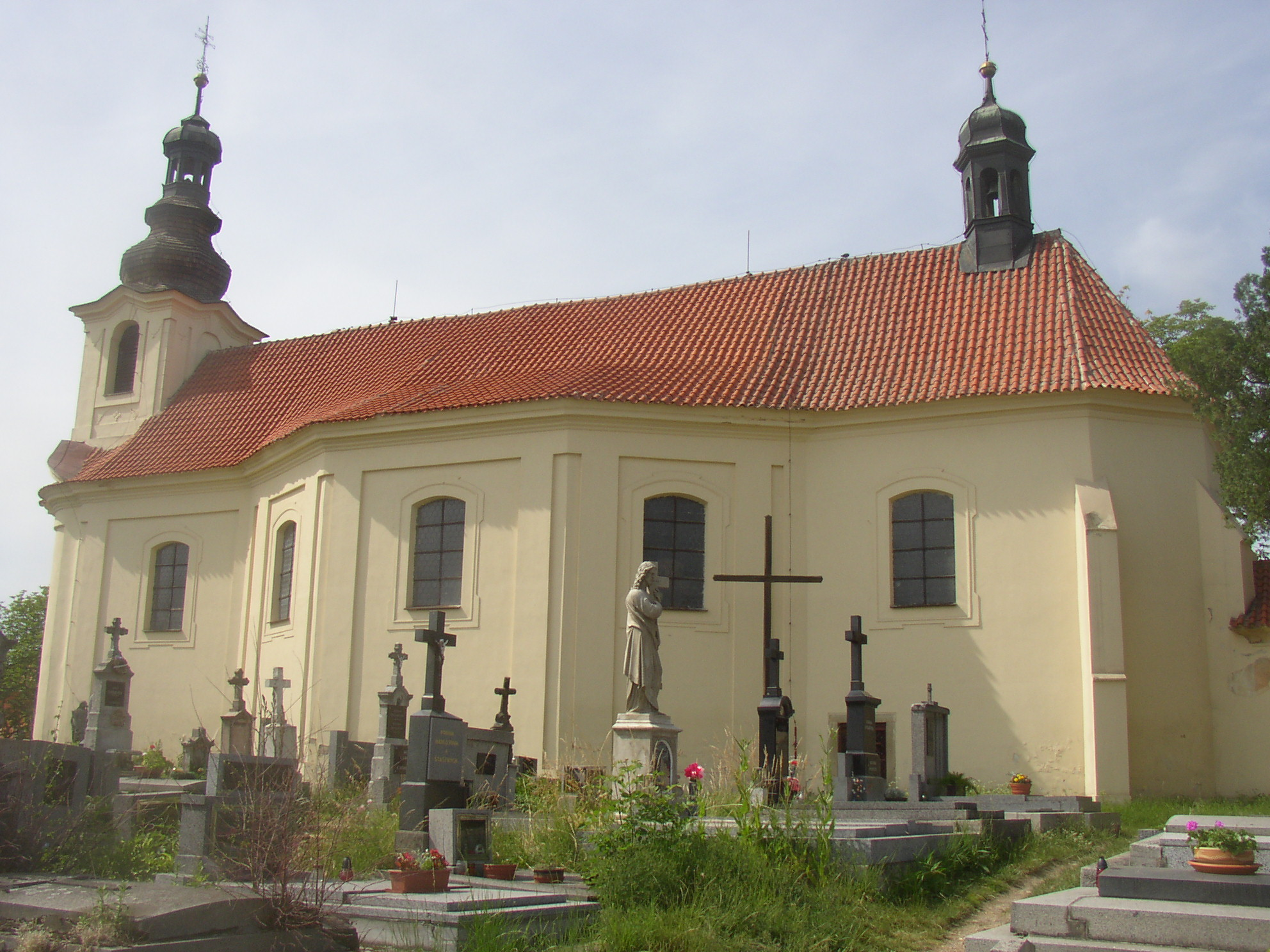
- Church of Saint James the Great

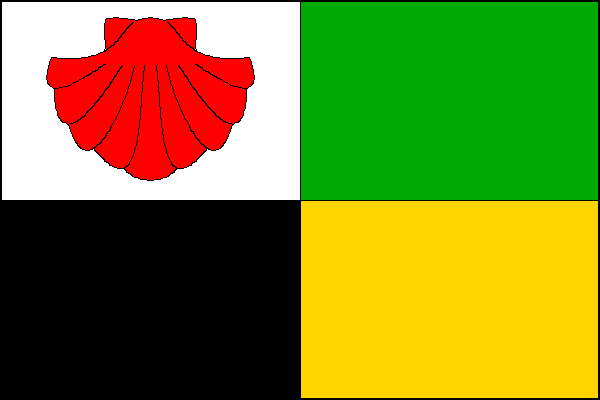
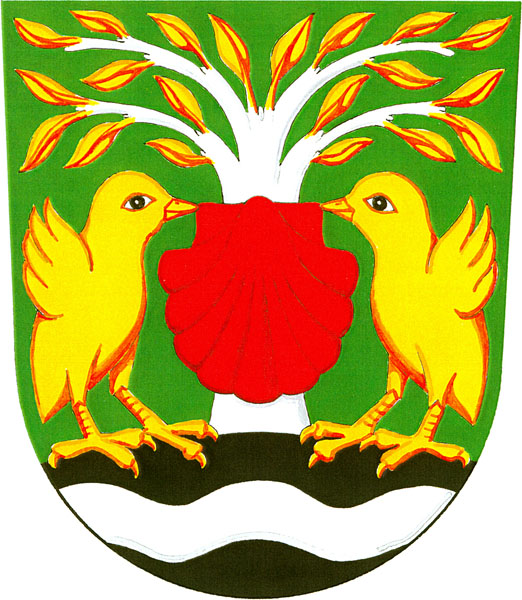
- Flag Coat of arms

- Location in the Czech Republic
- Coordinates: 50°0′52″N 14°14′27″E
- Country: Czech Republic
- Region: Central Bohemian
- District: Prague-West
- First mentioned: 1234

Area
  - Total: 6.34 km^{2} (2.45 sq mi)
- Elevation: 340 m (1,120 ft)

Population (2026-01-01)
  - Total: 963
  - Density: 152/km^{2} (393/sq mi)
- Time zone: UTC+1 (CET)
  - Summer (DST): UTC+2 (CEST)
- Postal code: 252 17
- Website: www.tachlovice.cz

Tachlovice is a municipality and village in Prague-West District in the Central Bohemian Region of the Czech Republic. It has about 1,000 inhabitants.

== Etymology ==
The initial name of the village was Taklovice. The name was derived from the personal name Takl, meaning "the village of Takl's people". In the 14th century, the name was distorted to its present form.

== Geography ==
Tachlovice lies about 7 kilometres (4 mi) southwest of Prague. It lies in a flat agricultural landscape in the Prague Plateau. The highest point is at 383 m (1,257 ft) above sea level. The stream Radotínský potok flows through the municipality.

== History ==
The first written mention of Tachlovice is from 1234.

== Demographics ==
Historical population

Year	Pop.	±%
1869	614	—
1880	619	+0.8%
1890	778	+25.7%
1900	938	+20.6%
1910	917	−2.2%

Year	Pop.	±%
1921	929	+1.3%
1930	884	−4.8%
1950	656	−25.8%
1961	643	−2.0%
1970	603	−6.2%

Year	Pop.	±%
1980	547	−9.3%
1991	557	+1.8%
2001	529	−5.0%
2011	840	+58.8%
2021	907	+8.0%

Source: Censuses

== Transport ==
There are no major roads passing through the municipality. The railway that runs next to the village is unused.

== Culture ==
Veteran Car Club Tachlovice was founded in 1960. Since 1976, it organises a veteran cars exhibition and contest called Tachlovice Triangle. It is held once a year in memory of the founder Jan Horák. Vehicles manufactured until the 1970s are displayed near the village common and some of them later compete driving on the triangle route.

== Sights ==
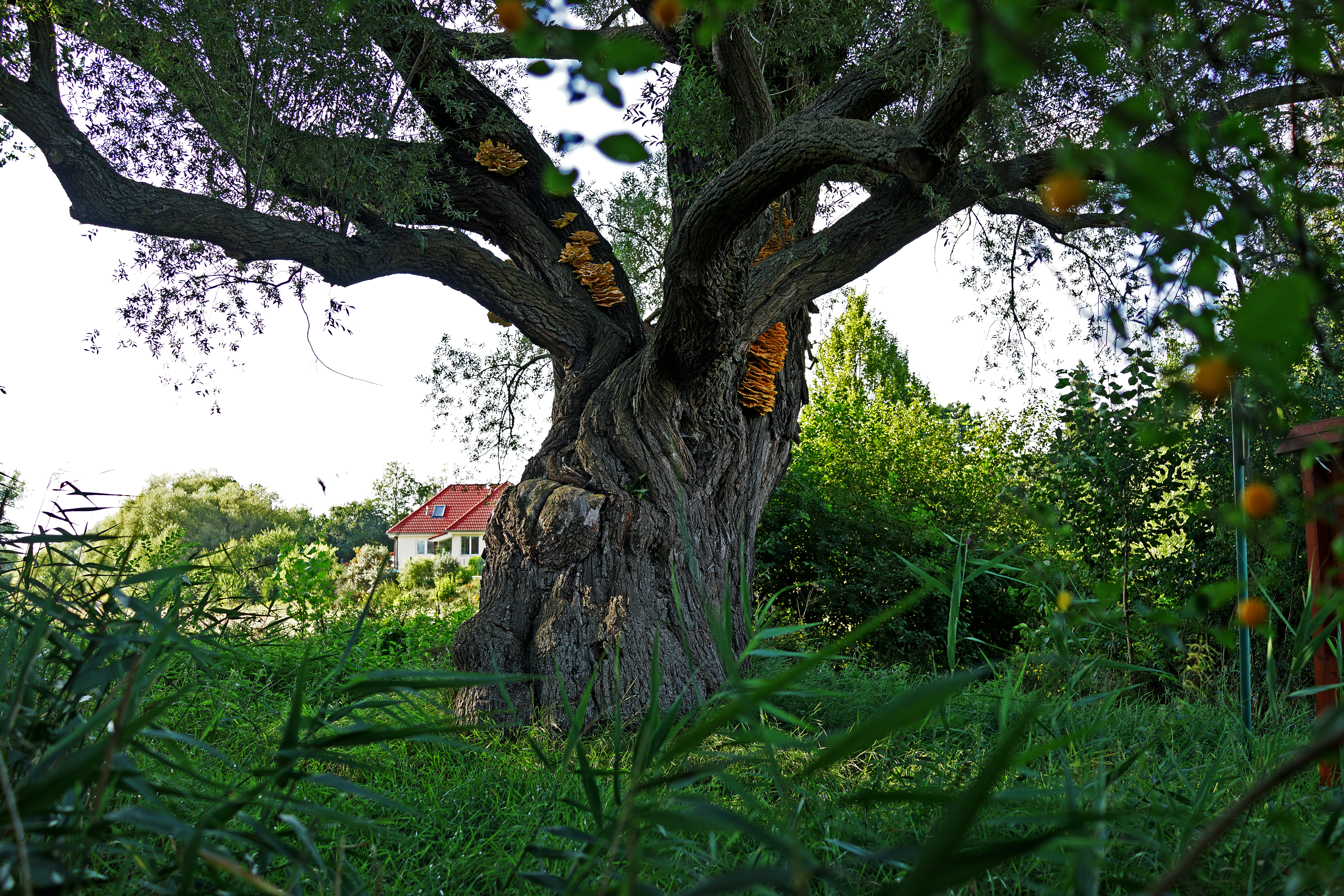
Tachlovice White Willow

The main landmark of Tachlovice is the Baroque complex of the Church of Saint James the Great. The complex is made up of architecturally and historically significant buildings from the 1740s with clear remnants of the original Gothic construction. The complex includes a prominent church and a cemetery chapel.

The Tachlovice White Willow is a memorable tree, which is one of the largest white willows in Bohemia with a shaft circuit of 773 cm (304 in).
