= Buštěhrad slag heap =

Semi-reclaimed industrial dumping ground in the Czech Republic

Coordinates: 50.1604°N 14.1794°E

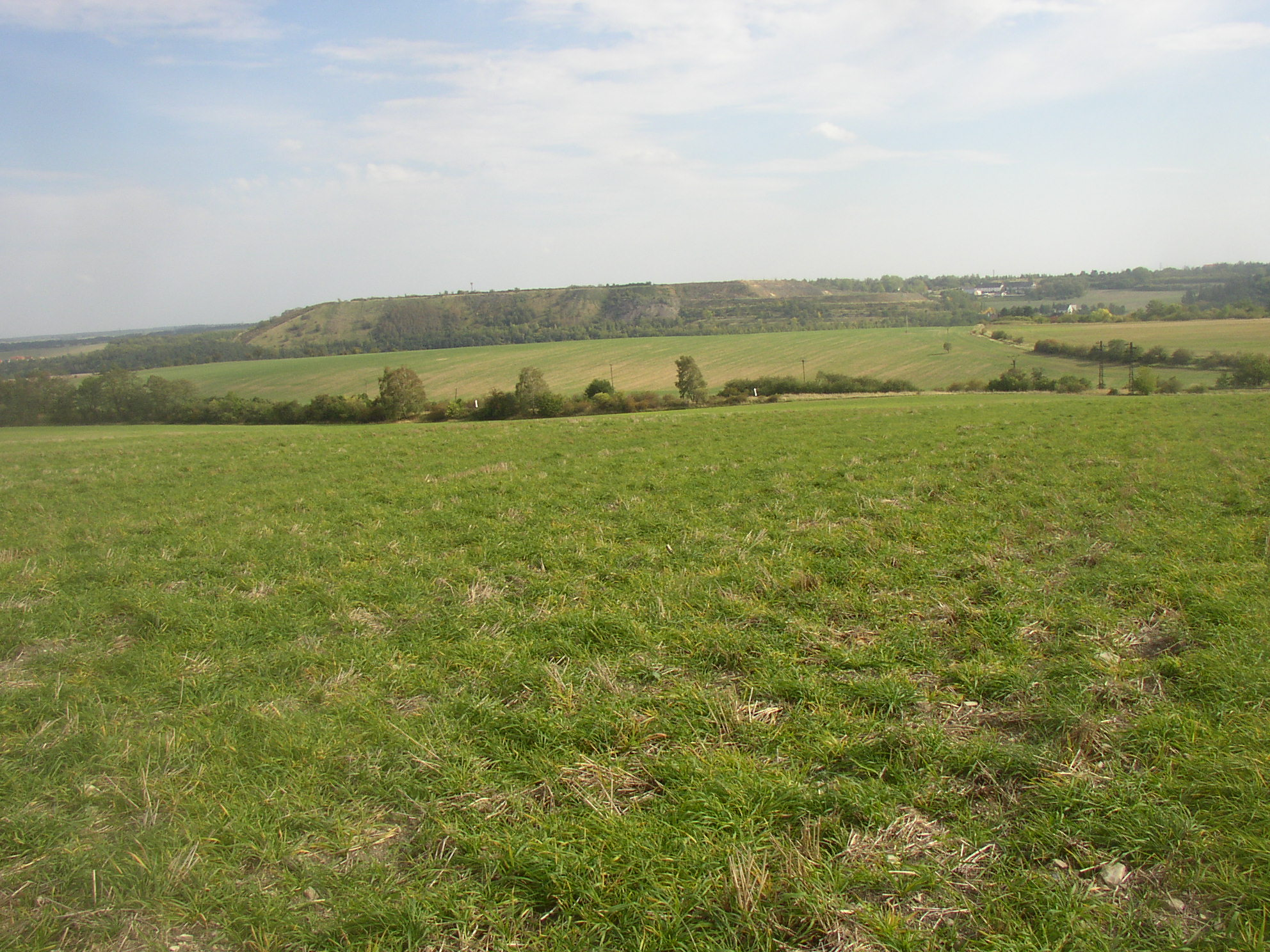
View from north-west

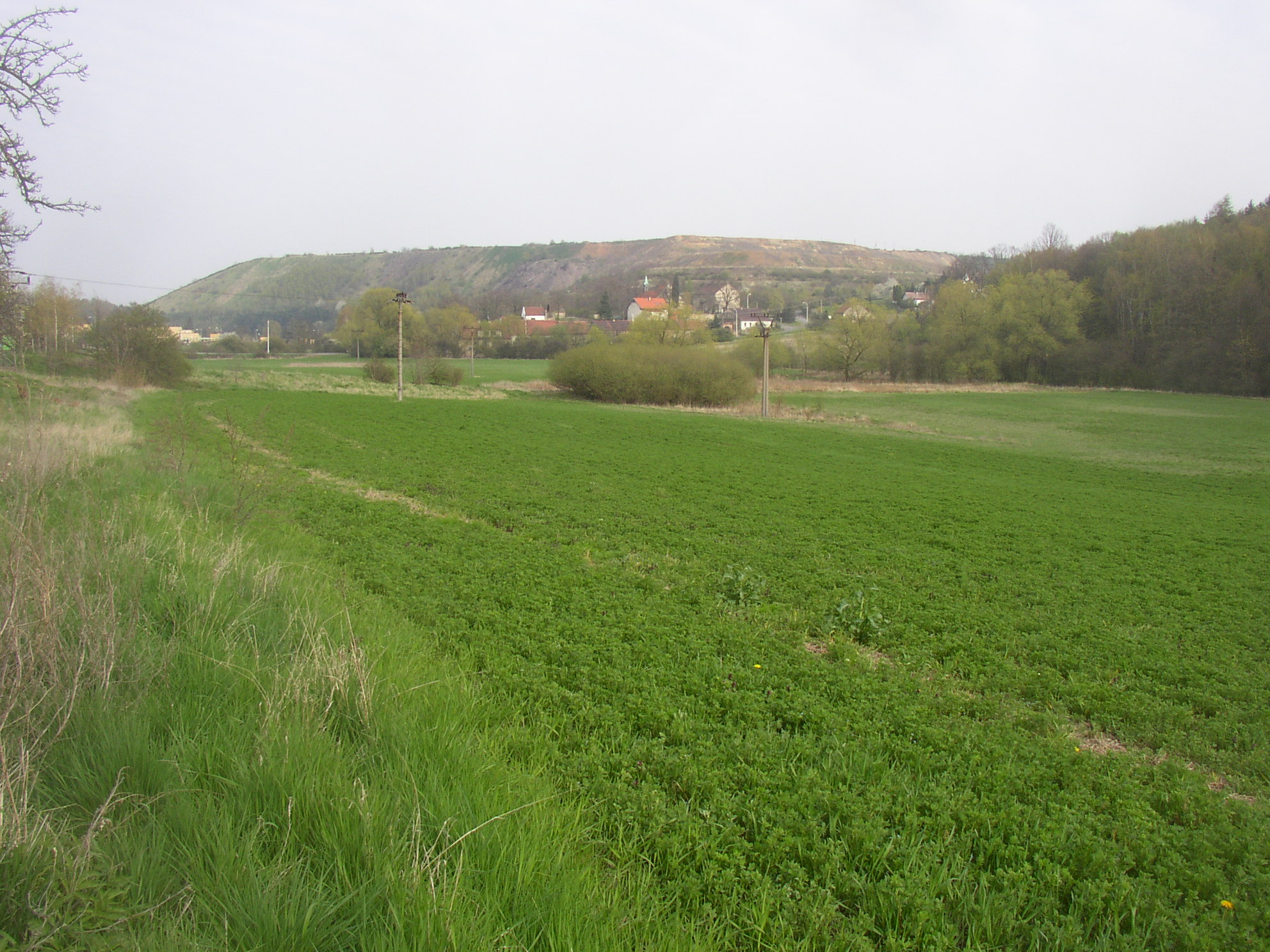
View from west (from Vrapice)

Buštěhrad slag heap (Czech: Buštěhradská halda; 357 metres (1,171 ft) asl) is a huge artificial hill between municipalities of Kladno-Vrapice, Buštěhrad and Stehelčeves near Kladno in the Central Bohemian Region of the Czech Republic that have arisen in the late 20th century as a dumping site for slag from the Kladno ironworks, and other industrial waste. This is one of the most massive heaps of Kladno area, which, particularly when viewed from the northeast, forms by far the most visible and noticeable part of the landscape in shape of a mesa.

The heap is situated less than 6 kilometres (4 mi) NE from the centre of the Kladno on right slope of shallow valley of the Dřetovický potok stream, in a place where borders of the three municipalities meet. Most of the heap (NE and central part) is based on cadastre of Stehelčeves. The southern part of it is on the territory of Buštěhrad town. Both these settlements lie within a few hundred paces from the heap. The westernmost part of the heap reaches the territory of the city of Kladno, specifically its suburb of Vrapice, just above the medieval church of St. Nicholas and municipal wastewater treatment plant.

The heap covers an area of approximately 55 hectares and has shape of a trapezoid, slightly stretched on the south. Dimensions are 800 × 600 m, on a diagonal about 1 100 m. Its height varies depending on the surrounding terrain - from the southern side it is a little over 20 meters and on the north heap rises above bottom of the valley for nearly 70 m. The main, approximately trapezium body of the heap is extended vy a minor salient in the northwest in the northwest. This is the only active section of the heap at the present time. All the rest of the heap is no longer in use and so its overall size does not increase in any way.

The core business of the heap, founded after the World War II, in 1950s through 1980s. Rail siding, which is connected to Kladno industrial complexes, bridges the local road Vrapice - Buštehrad the southwestern edge of the heap. From this point took place gradually and enlarging body. According to current estimates, the heap contains about 23 to 27 million tons of materials - blast furnace and steelmaking slag and sludge treatment, cogeneration ash, cinders, sludge from wastewater treatment plants. And less were placed there, both free and in barrels, hazardous waste, including lead-containing or cyanide. Public outrage (later supported by the media attention when a popular magazine Mlady Svet/Young World) created in a 1988 case where a group of children from surrounding villages climbed Bustehrad heap to play and were poisoned. This fact only sped up the ongoing downturn operation and reclamation of the heap. In the late 80's and early 90's most of the heap was covered with clay.

Now most of the heap is covered in wild vegetation and trees have gradually begun to grow again. The heap has become habitat for wild animals, especially hares and pheasants, and its role in the ecosystem of the surrounding countryside can even be compared to the nearby natural monument Vinarice mountain.

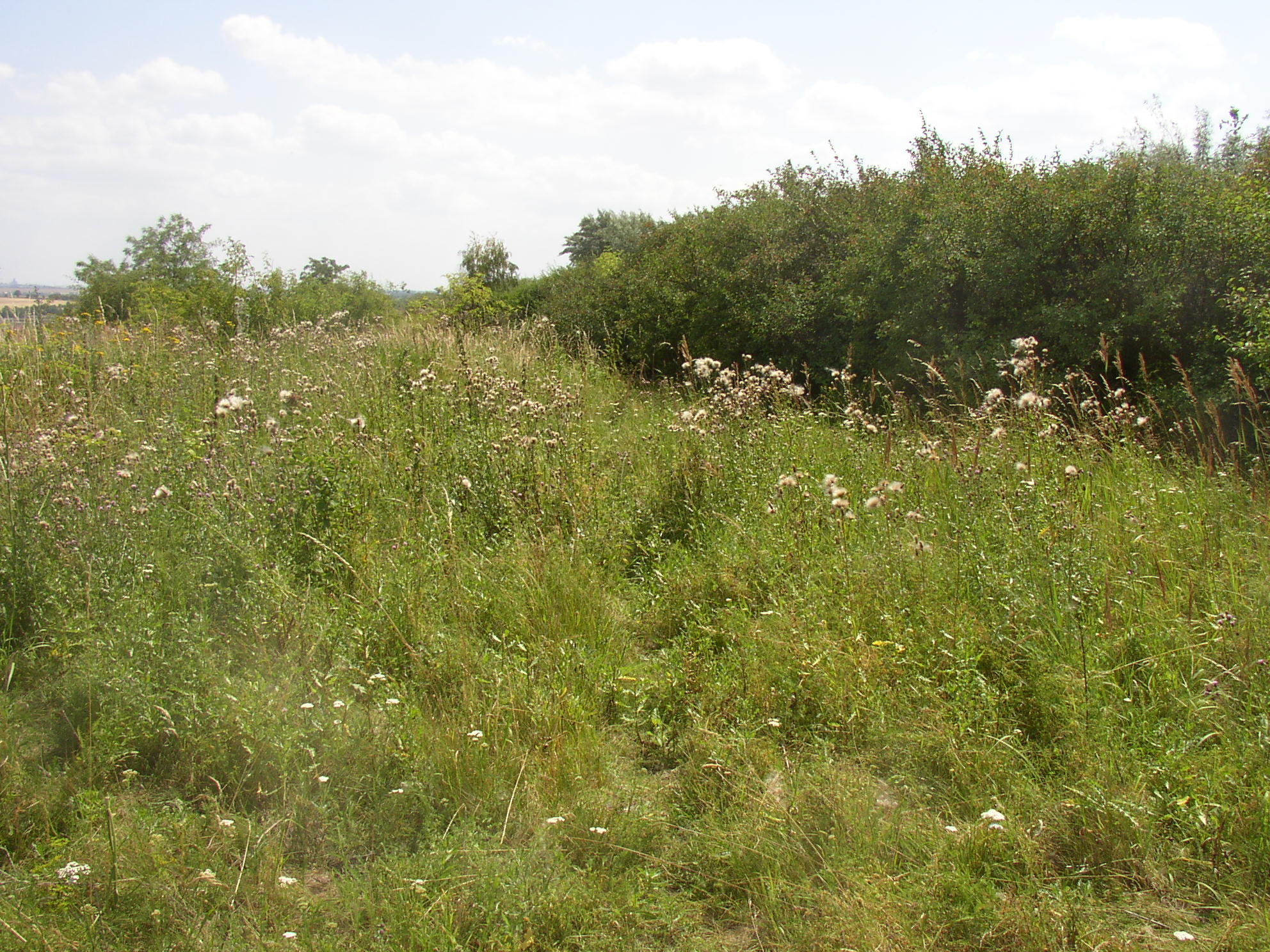
Natural succession (July 2004)

At present time, heap doesn't represent for people around some inconvenience, no more significant spreading of dust, toxins, etc. This positive fact probably contributes strongly alkaline environment heap leaching of pollutants. There are no studies that would provide accurate information about the composition inside the heap, and the ongoing processes there and help predict future activities inside head. Bustehrad Heap got attention again between 2005 and 2006, when its owner, the company REAL Kladno Leasing Ltd., came up with a plan to progressively to extract part of heap and utilize (especially steel plant slag) for construction and other materials (a process will be lasted 18 years and the public purse would be cost 10 to 15 billion Czech crowns). Realization of this plan was not started, because resist of residents of not only neighboring the villages.

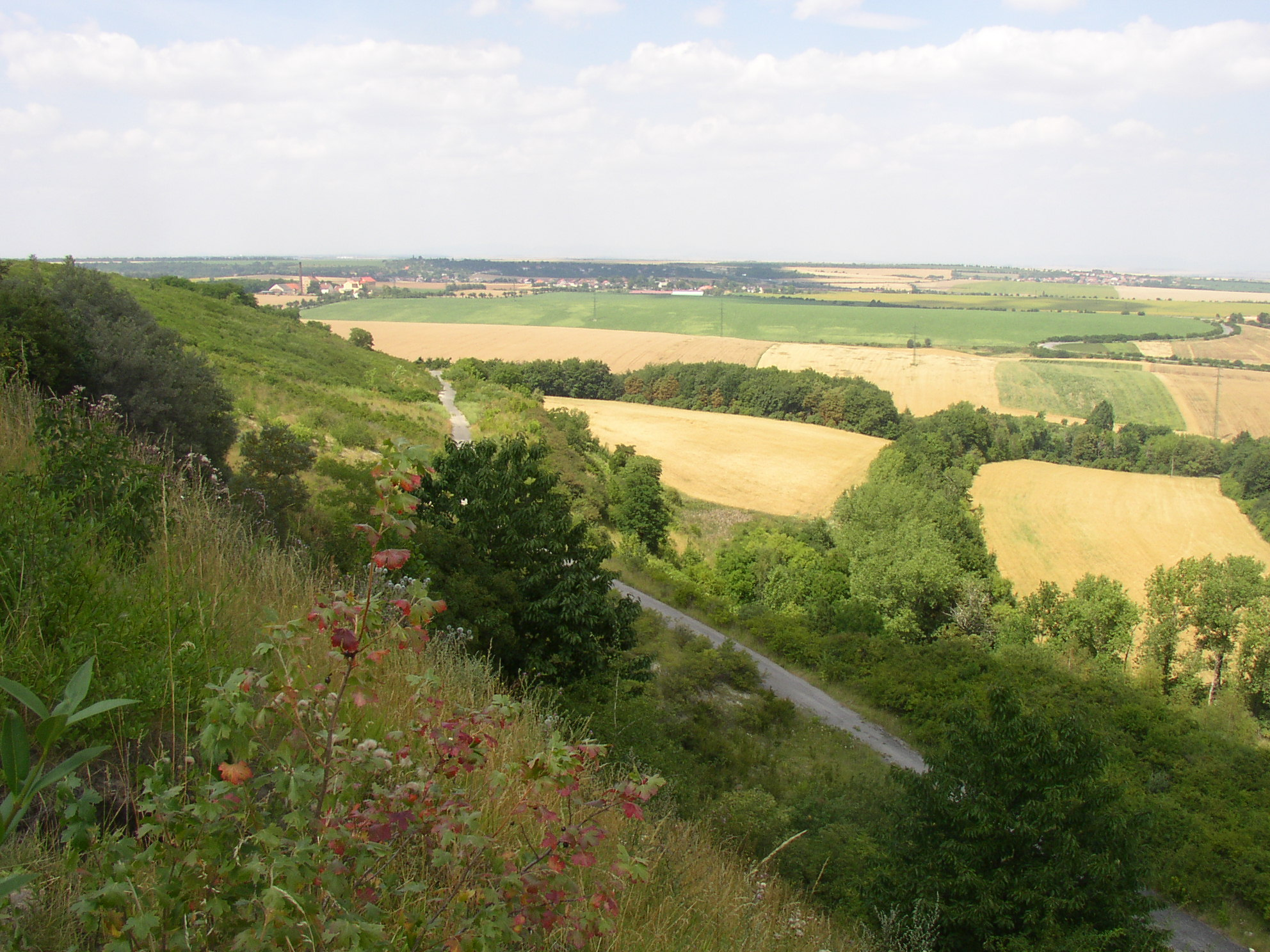
View from SE towards North

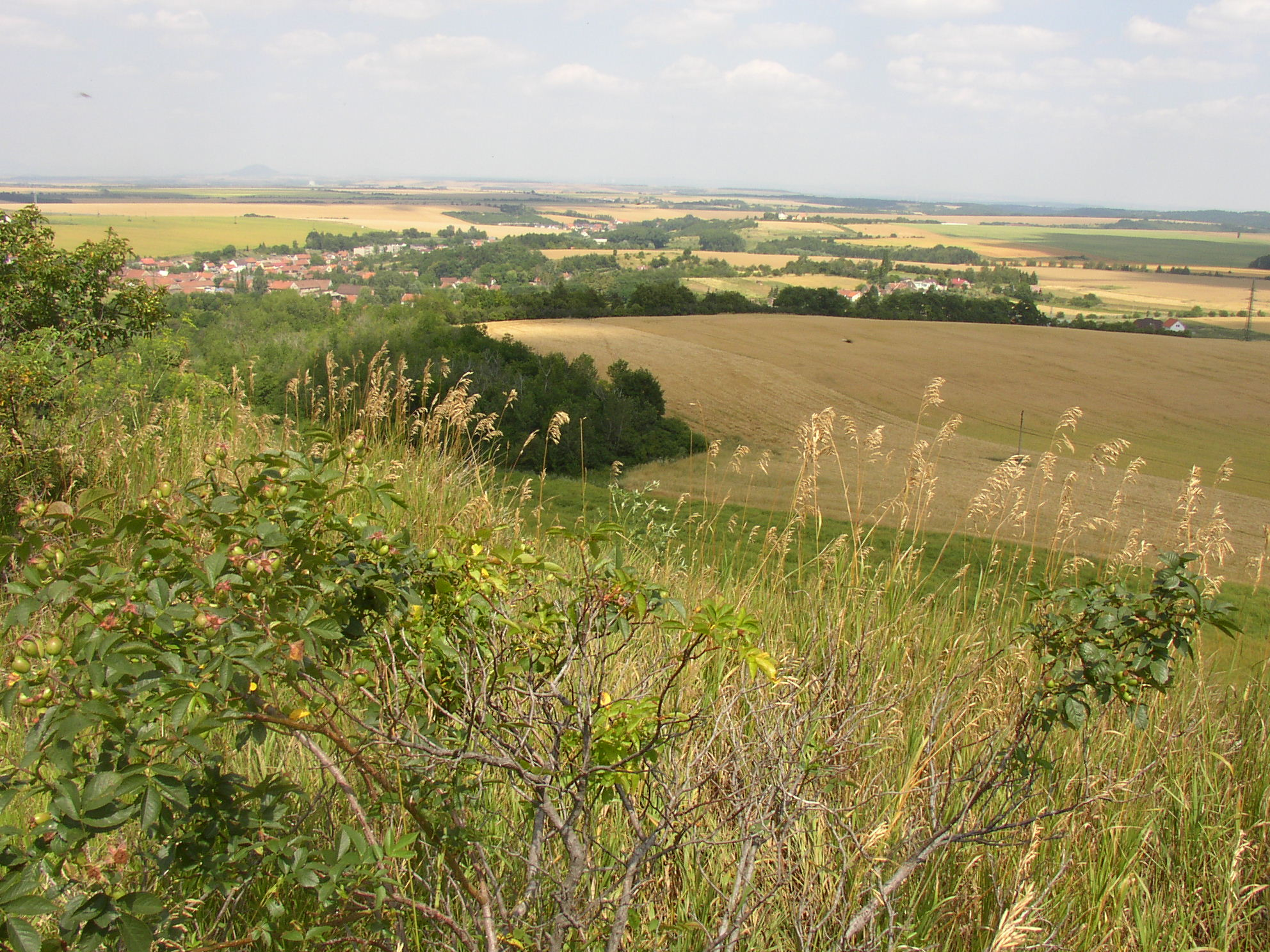
View from SE corner towards NE (towards Stehelceves)

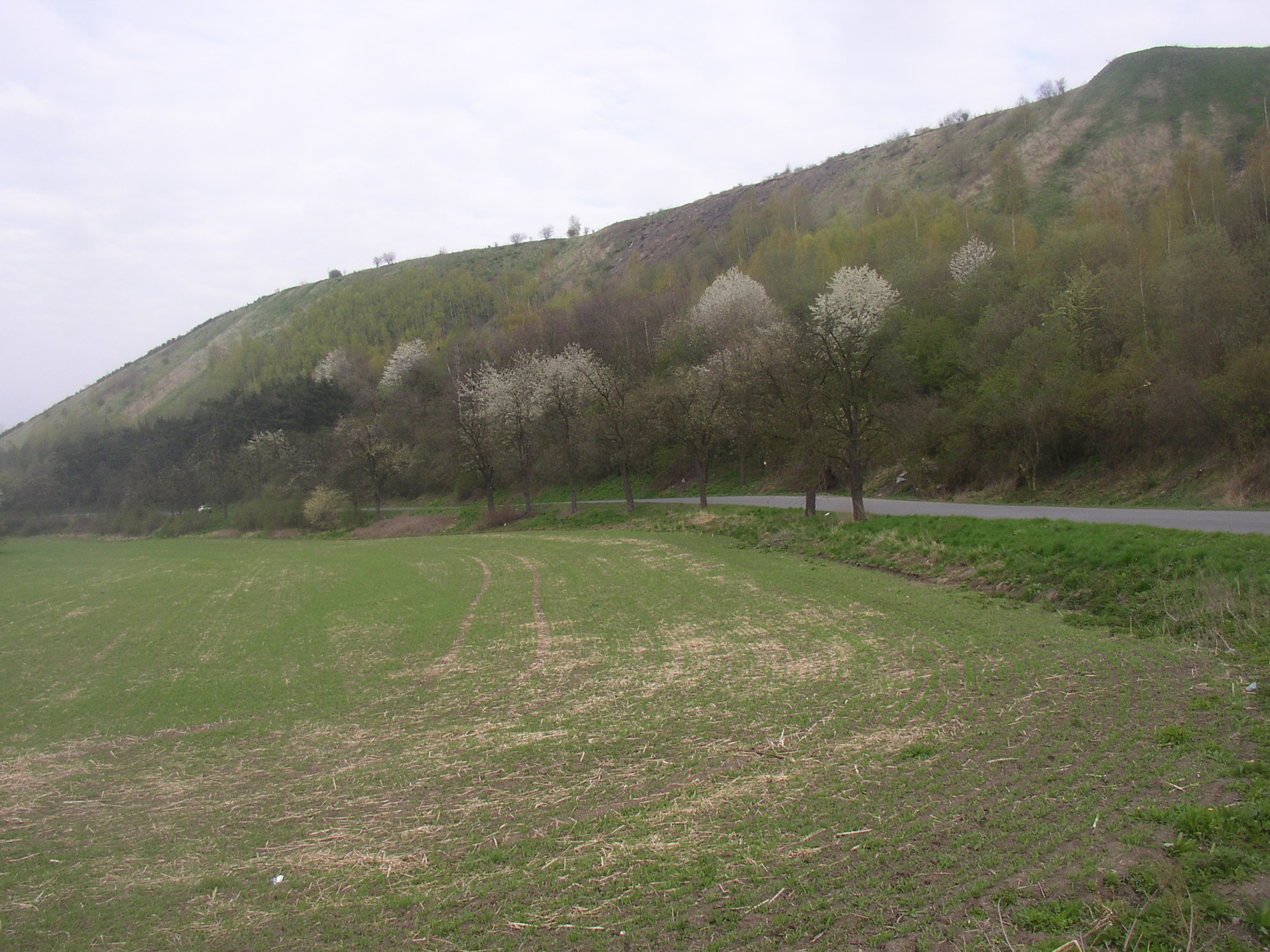
North slope above the road from Vrapice to Stehelceves

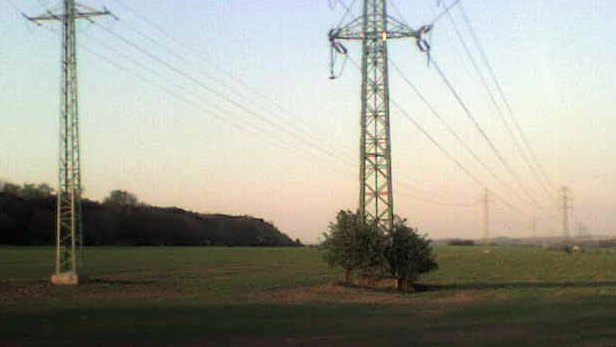
View from SW (road from Vrapice to Bustehrad)
