= Jaroslav Burgr =

Czech footballer (1906–1986)

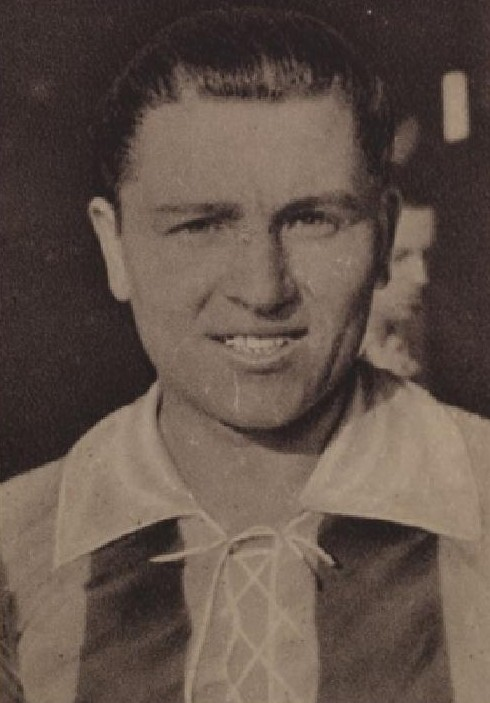

Personal information
- Date of birth: 7 March 1906
- Place of birth: Velké Přítočno, Austria-Hungary
- Date of death: 15 September 1986 (aged 80)
- Place of death: Czechoslovakia
- Position: Defender

Youth career
- 1920–1922: SK Kročehlavy

Senior career*
Years	Team	Apps	(Gls)
1922–1926	SK Kročehlavy		
1926–1946	Sparta Prague		
1946–1948	SK Most		

International career
1927–1928	Czechoslovakia Amateur	3	(0)
1929–1939	Czechoslovakia	57	(0)
Medal record
Representing Czechoslovakia
Men's Football
FIFA World Cup
Runner-up	1934 Italy
- * Club domestic league appearances and goals

Jaroslav Burgr (7 March 1906 in Velké Přítočno – 15 September 1986) was a Czech football defender. He played for Czechoslovakia.

He participated in two World Cups, in 1934 and 1938. He played 57 matches for the national team, and made three appearances for the Czechoslovakia Amateur team.

Burgr played domestic football mostly for AC Sparta Prague, making 242 appearances and scoring once between 1930 and 1944. During that period he also won five league titles. Additionally he was part of the victorious Sparta teams in the 1927 Mitropa Cup and 1935 Mitropa Cup.
