= Karel Wellner =

Czech artist, art historian and critic

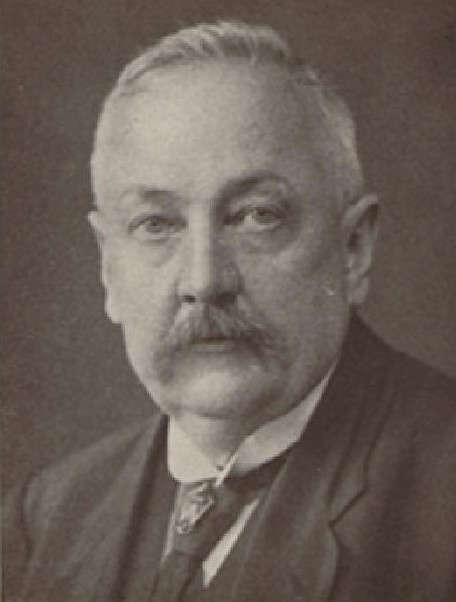
Karel Wellner

Karel Wellner (5 March 1875 in Unhošť – 14 June 1926 in Olomouc) was a Czech graphic artist, painter, cartoonist, illustrator, art historian and critic. He was also a secondary school teacher and professor.

He graduated from high school in Prague, and then studied industrial engineering and art in Prague. He moved to Olomouc in 1902 and was active in illustrating professional literature and as an art historian. Some of his works were published in Germany. As a painter he took part in exhibitions in Prague and with the Association of Visual Artists in Moravia. He was active mainly in graphic art. He has published several lithographs and etchings of the old city of Olomouc.

== See also ==
- List of Czech painters
