= Říčany =

Town in the Czech Republic

- Town
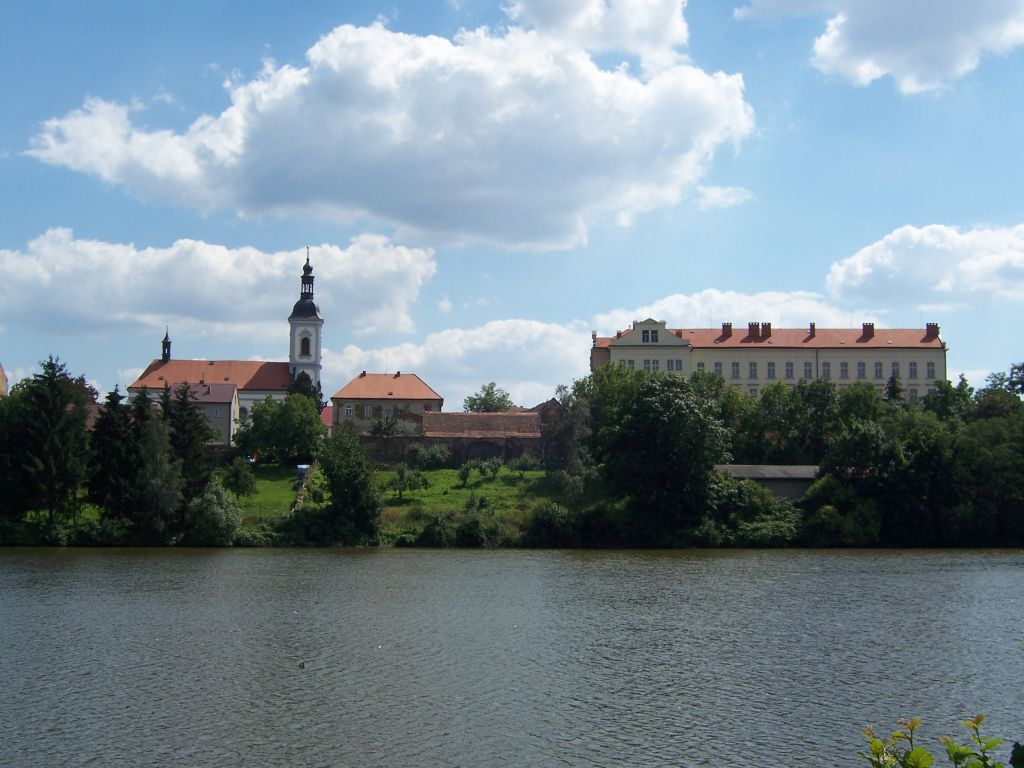
- View of the town centre

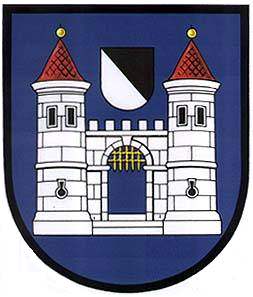
- Flag Coat of arms

- Location in the Czech Republic
- Coordinates: 49°59′31″N 14°39′20″E
- Country: Czech Republic
- Region: Central Bohemian
- District: Prague-East
- First mentioned: 1289

Government
  - Mayor: David Michalička

Area
  - Total: 25.81 km^{2} (9.97 sq mi)
- Elevation: 341 m (1,119 ft)

Population (2026-01-01)
  - Total: 17,314
  - Density: 670.8/km^{2} (1,737/sq mi)
- Time zone: UTC+1 (CET)
  - Summer (DST): UTC+2 (CEST)
- Postal code: 251 01
- Website: info.ricany.cz

Říčany (Czech pronunciation: [ˈr̝iːtʃanɪ]; German: Ritschan) is a town in Prague-East District in the Central Bohemian Region of the Czech Republic. It has about 17,000 inhabitants. The town is located on the stream Říčanský potok, on the border between the Prague Plateau and Benešov Uplands.

Since 2018, Říčany has continuously ranked first in the national Quality of Life Index, which has been comparing the standard of living in the cities and towns of the Czech Republic.

== Administrative division ==
Říčany consists of seven municipal parts (in brackets population according to the 2021 census):

- Říčany (10,731)
- Jažlovice (163)
- Kuří (185)
- Pacov (1,037)
- Radošovice (2,750)
- Strašín (1,165)
- Voděrádky (413)

== Etymology ==
The initial name of Říčany was Ričany. The name was derived from the personal name Rik, meaning "the village of Riks (Rik's family)".

== Geography ==
Říčany is located about 10 kilometres (6 mi) east of Prague. The western part of the municipal territory lies in the Prague Plateau and the eastern part in the Benešov Uplands. The highest point is at 454 m (1,490 ft) above sea level. The town lies on the stream Říčanský potok, which supplies several small fish ponds.

== History ==
According to Czech Chronicle of Wenceslaus Hajek, Říčany existed already in 748. The first trustworthy written mention of the settlement is from 1289. A large castle was built here in 1260–1270, but during the Hussite Wars it was conquered and abandoned, and in the 16th century, it became a ruin.

Říčany experienced a decline after the Thirty Years' War. After the construction of Prague–Vienna railway in 1869, the town began to prosper and develop again. Luxury villas began to be built, and Říčany became a popular recreational location.

== Demographics ==
Historical population

Year	Pop.	±%
1869	2,948	—
1880	3,102	+5.2%
1890	3,159	+1.8%
1900	3,729	+18.0%
1910	4,181	+12.1%

Year	Pop.	±%
1921	5,121	+22.5%
1930	7,900	+54.3%
1950	9,215	+16.6%
1961	9,611	+4.3%
1970	9,330	−2.9%

Year	Pop.	±%
1980	10,703	+14.7%
1991	10,650	−0.5%
2001	10,876	+2.1%
2011	14,003	+28.8%
2021	16,444	+17.4%

Source: Censuses

== Economy ==
According to the national Quality of Life Index, which has been comparing the standard of living in the cities and towns of the Czech Republic, Říčany is rated the best place to live in the country in all years from the first edition in 2018 to the last one in 2025.

== Transport ==
The D1 motorway from Prague to Brno runs through the municipal territory.

Říčany is located on the railway line Prague–Benešov.

== Culture ==
Among the cultural events that are annually held in Říčany are Starák (multicultural festival held at the beginning of August) and Říčanský nos (town festival held at the beginning of September).

== Education ==
There are ten primary schoold in Říčany: five public primary schools, four private primary schools and one primary school, which is part of the Oliva Children's Sanatorium. There are three secondary schools: the public Gymnasium Říčany, the private Masaryk Gymnasium, and Říčany Vocational Secondary School.

== Sights ==
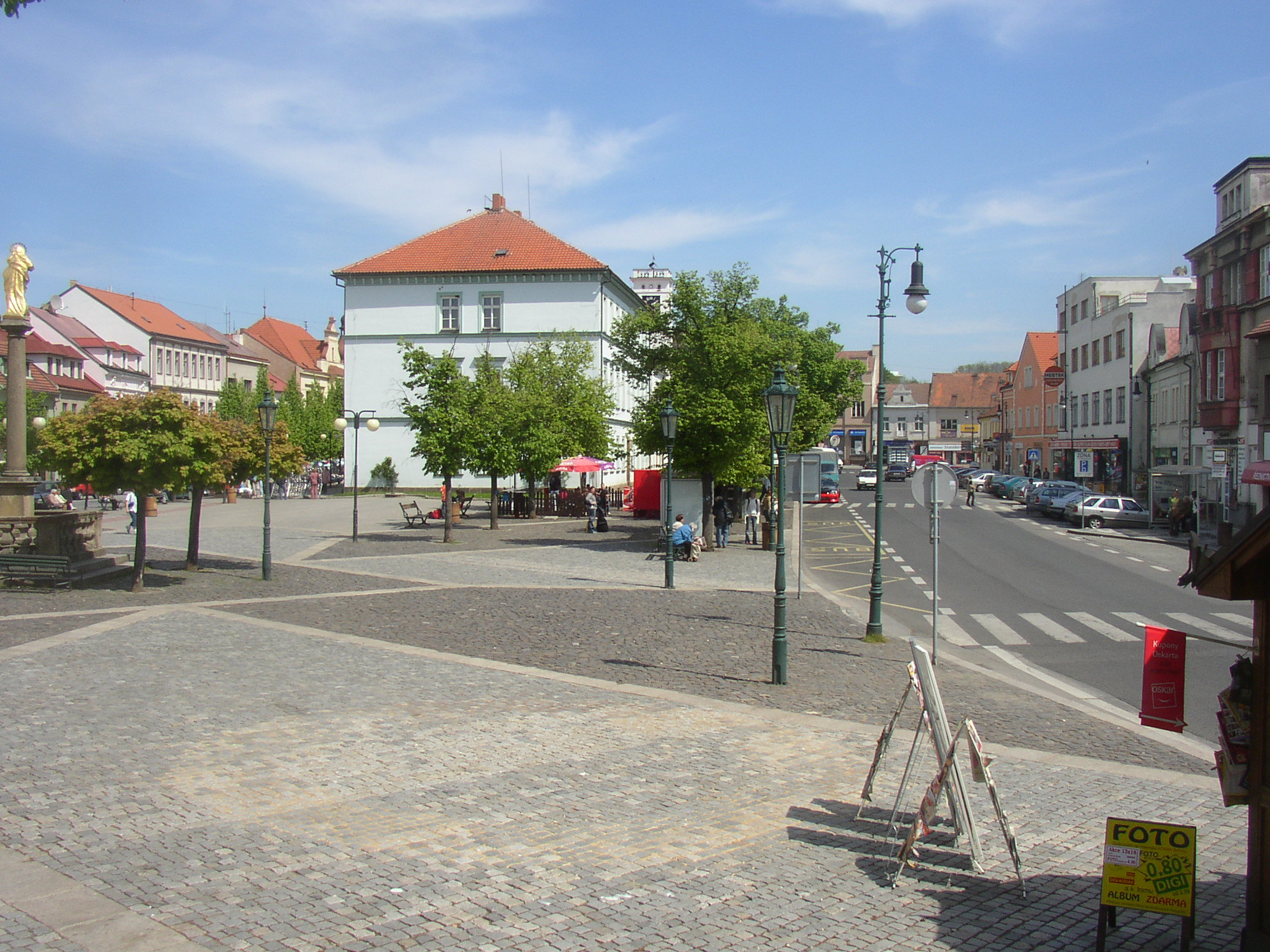
The square Masarykovo náměstí

The Říčany Castle was one of the oldest stone castles in the Czech Republic. The ruins of the early Gothic castle are freely accessible.

The Church of Saints Peter and Paul and the town hall from 1864 are the landmarks of Masarykovo Square. The church was originally a Gothic building from around 1270. After it was destroyed during the Thirty Years' War, it was rebuilt in the Baroque style in 1719. The Marian column on the town square, with a gilded statue of the Virgin Mary Immaculate, dates from 1699. It is a simplified copy of the column that stood on the Old Town Square in Prague.

Jureček lido in Radošovice was founded in the 1920s. Due to its age and atmosphere, it is among the most popular swimming pools in the region.

== Twin towns – sister cities ==
Říčany is twinned with:

- Albertslund, Denmark
- Borken, Germany
- Dainville, France
- Grabow, Germany
- Opatówek, Poland
- Whitstable, England, United Kingdom
