= Jesenice (Prague-West District) =

- Town
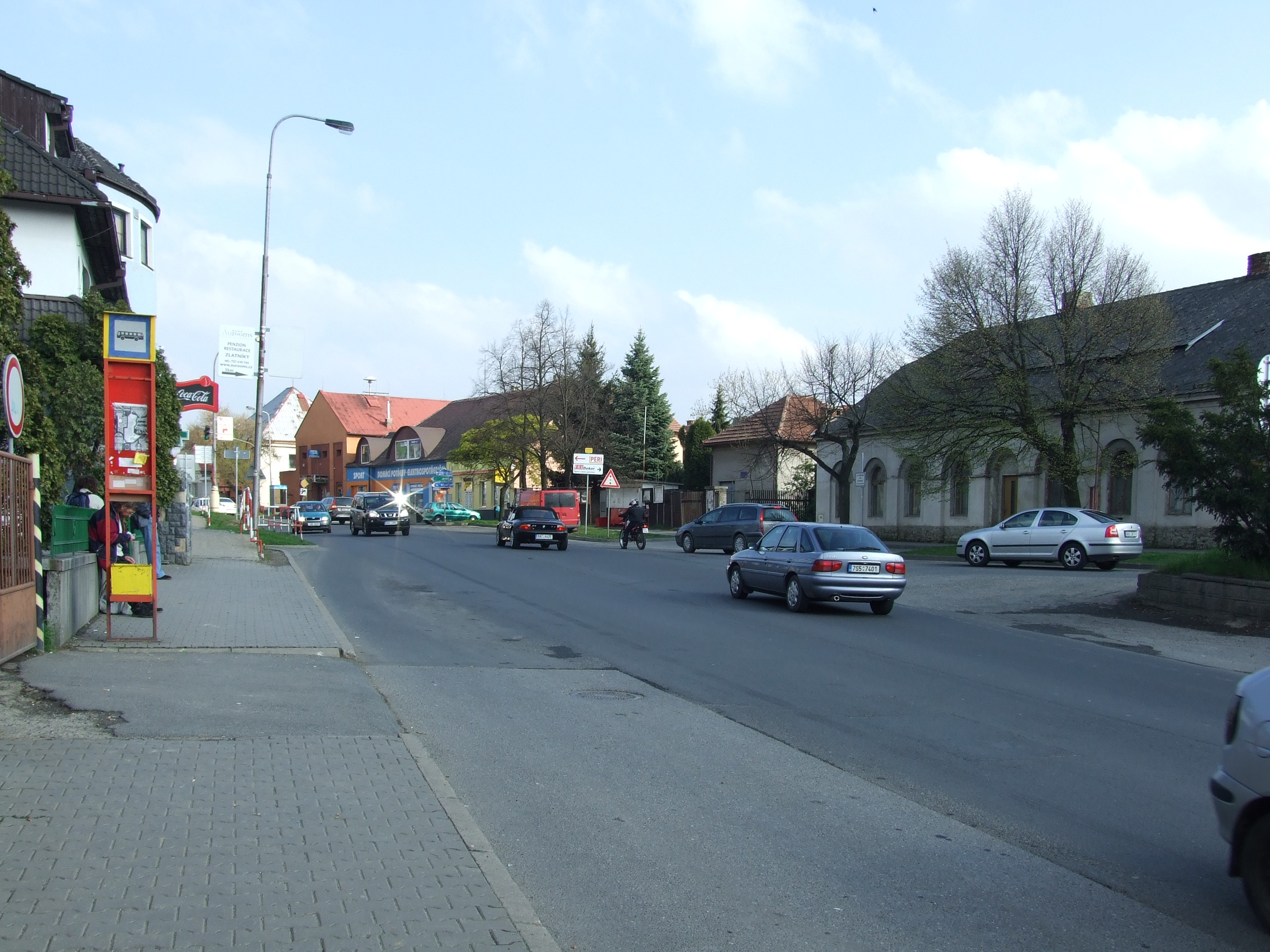
- Centre of Jesenice

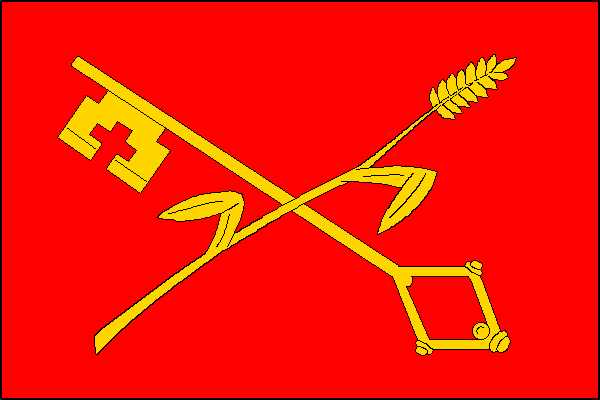
- Flag Coat of arms

- Location in the Czech Republic
- Coordinates: 49°58′6″N 14°30′49″E
- Country: Czech Republic
- Region: Central Bohemian
- District: Prague-West
- First mentioned: 1088

Government
  - Mayor: Pavel Smutný

Area
  - Total: 17.54 km^{2} (6.77 sq mi)
- Elevation: 358 m (1,175 ft)

Population (2026-01-01)
  - Total: 10,625
  - Density: 605.8/km^{2} (1,569/sq mi)
- Time zone: UTC+1 (CET)
  - Summer (DST): UTC+2 (CEST)
- Postal code: 252 42
- Website: www.mujesenice.cz

Jesenice (Czech pronunciation: [ˈjɛsɛɲɪtsɛ]) is a town in Prague-West District in the Central Bohemian Region of the Czech Republic. It has about 11,000 inhabitants. Located near Prague, Jesenice obtained the town status in 2015 and is one of the fastest-growing municipalities in the country in the 21st century.

== Administrative division ==
Jesenice consists of four municipal parts (in brackets population according to the 2021 census):

- Jesenice (6,112)
- Horní Jirčany (926)
- Osnice (1,920)
- Zdiměřice (1,687)

== Etymology ==
The name is derived from the adjective jesenná (from jasan, i.e. 'ash') and originally denoted a meadow between ash trees or water flowing between ash trees.

== Geography ==
Jesenice is located south of Prague, in its immediate vicinity. Most of the municipal territory lies in the Prague Plateau, but it also extends into the Benešov Uplands in the south. The highest point is at 429 m (1,407 ft) above sea level. The streams Botič and Jesenický potok flow through the territory, feeding there several small fishponds.

== History ==
The first written mention of Jesenice is from 1088.

In 2015, the municipality was promoted to a town and lost the title of the "largest village" in the Czech Republic.

== Demographics ==
Thanks to its proximity to Prague, Jesenice belongs to the fastest growing municipalities in the country in the 21st century.

Historical population

Year	Pop.	±%
1869	1,148	—
1880	1,321	+15.1%
1890	1,338	+1.3%
1900	1,224	−8.5%
1910	1,306	+6.7%

Year	Pop.	±%
1921	1,200	−8.1%
1930	1,394	+16.2%
1950	1,301	−6.7%
1961	1,345	+3.4%
1970	1,298	−3.5%

Year	Pop.	±%
1980	1,455	+12.1%
1991	1,758	+20.8%
2001	2,475	+40.8%
2011	7,628	+208.2%
2021	10,645	+39.6%

Source: Censuses

== Transport ==
The D0 motorway (part of the European route E50) runs next to the town.

== Sights ==
There are no major cultural and historical landmarks. A cultural monument is the memorial of Maxmiliána Alsterová of Astfeld. It is a Baroque memorial from the early 18th century. It commemorates the first victim of a traffic accident in Czech lands, who died in 1706.
