= Makotřasy =

- Municipality
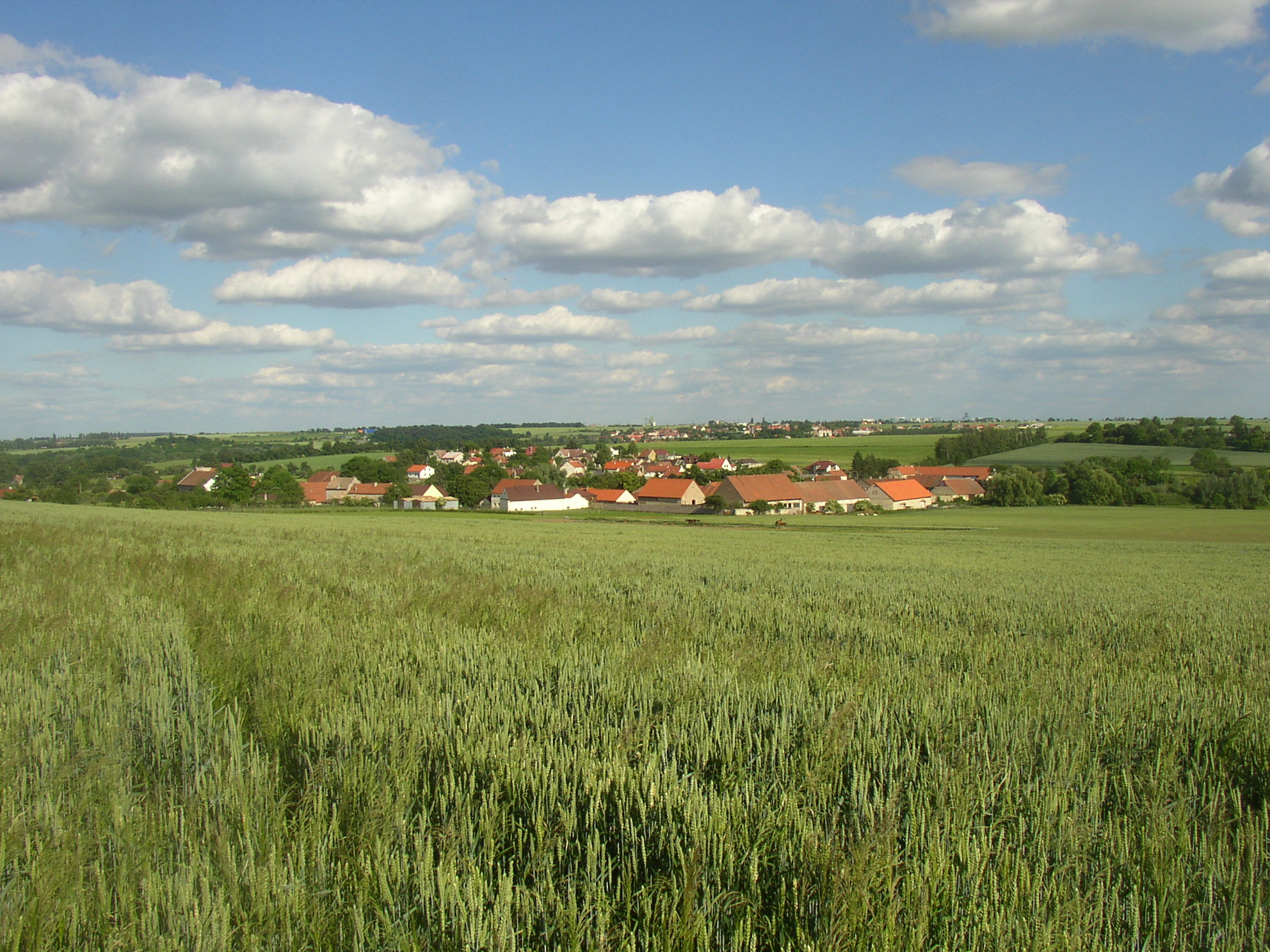
- View from the northwest

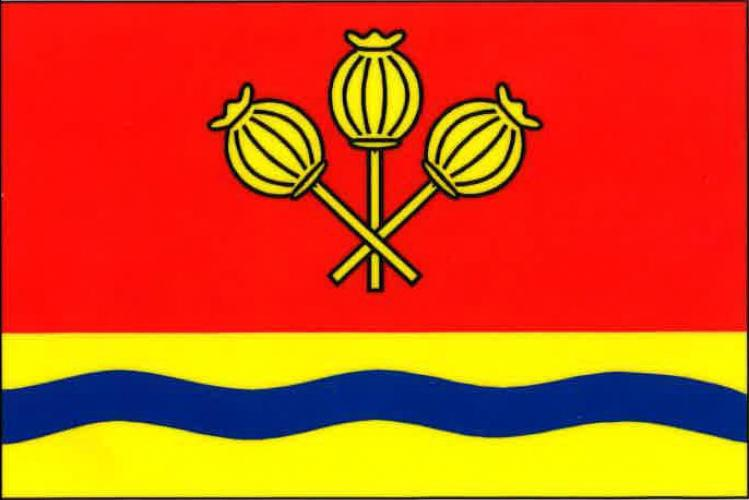
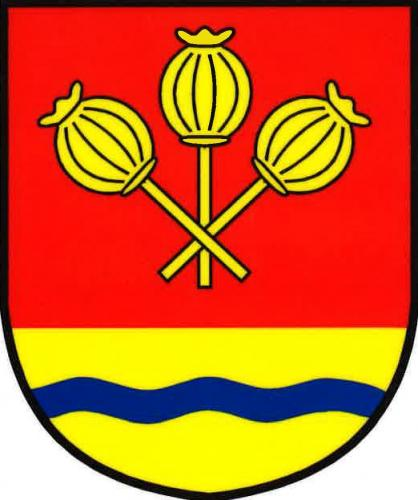
- Flag Coat of arms

- Location in the Czech Republic
- Coordinates: 50°8′40″N 14°12′53″E
- Country: Czech Republic
- Region: Central Bohemian
- District: Kladno
- First mentioned: 1318

Area
  - Total: 4.33 km^{2} (1.67 sq mi)
- Elevation: 303 m (994 ft)

Population (2026-01-01)
  - Total: 518
  - Density: 120/km^{2} (310/sq mi)
- Time zone: UTC+1 (CET)
  - Summer (DST): UTC+2 (CEST)
- Postal code: 273 54
- Website: www.makotrasy.cz

Makotřasy is a municipality and village in Kladno District in the Central Bohemian Region of the Czech Republic. It has about 500 inhabitants.

== Demographics ==
Historical population
Year	Pop.	±%
1869	294	—
1880	312	+6.1%
1890	371	+18.9%
1900	393	+5.9%
1910	422	+7.4%
1921	414	−1.9%
1930	463	+11.8%
1950	375	−19.0%
1961	392	+4.5%
1970	360	−8.2%
1980	317	−11.9%
1991	311	−1.9%
2001	328	+5.5%
2011	373	+13.7%
2021	517	+38.6%
Source: Censuses
