= Prague Plateau =

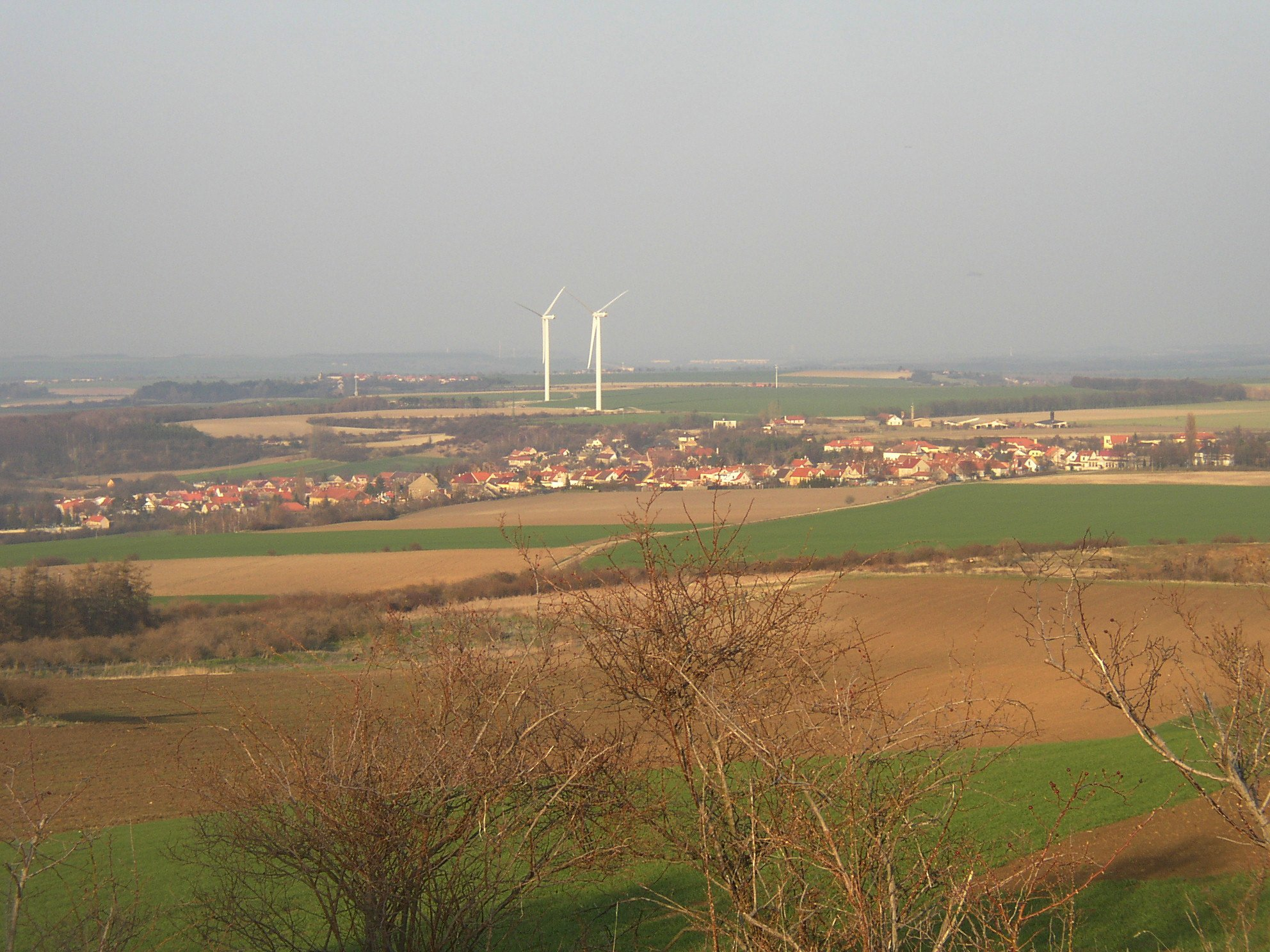
- View from Vinařická hora

Highest point
- Peak: Na Rovinách
- Elevation: 435 m (1,427 ft)

Dimensions
- Area: 1,128 km^{2} (436 mi^{2})

Geography
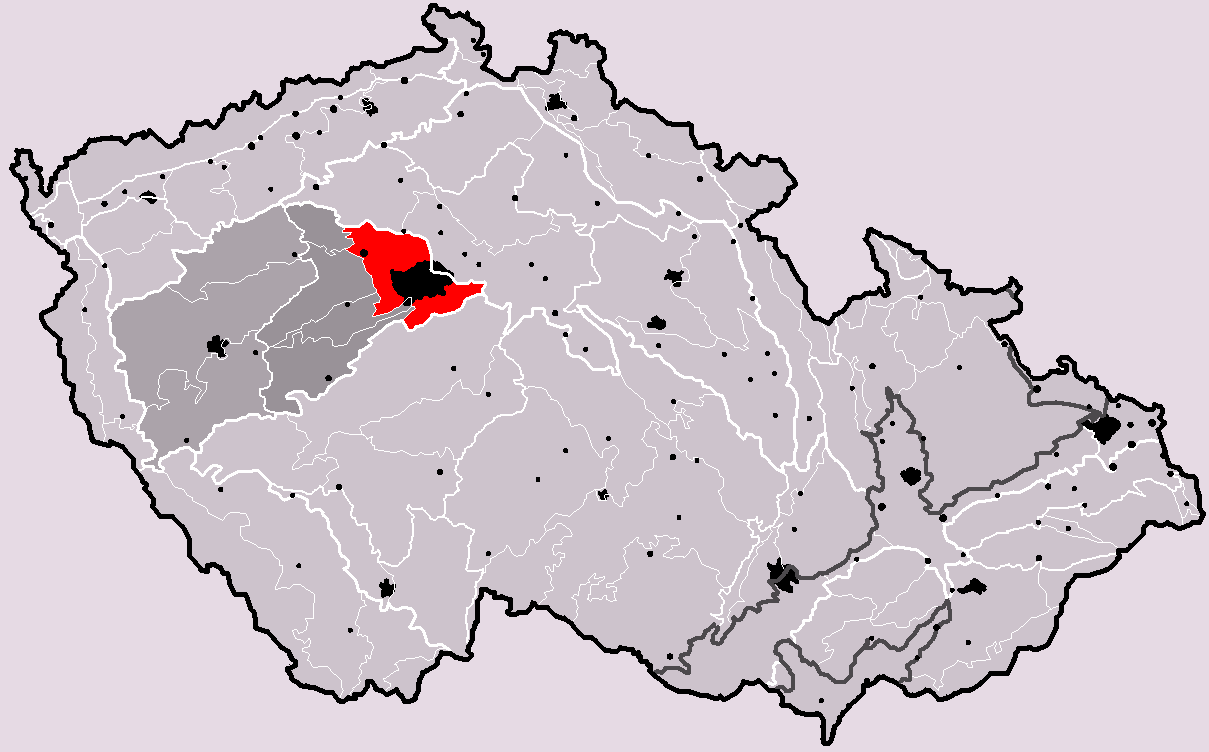
- Prague Plateau in the geomorphological system of the Czech Republic
- Country: Czech Republic
- Regions: Prague, Central Bohemian
- Range coordinates: 50°6′N 14°22′E
- Parent range: Brdy Macroregion

The Prague Plateau (Czech: Pražská plošina) is a plateau and a geomorphological mesoregion of the Czech Republic. It is located in the area of Prague and in the Central Bohemian Region.

== Geomorphology ==
The Prague Plateau is a mesoregion of the Brdy Macroregion within the Bohemian Massif. It is a denudation plateau with neogene aligned surfaces. Inselbergs and structural ridges are a characteristic element of the relief. The plateau is further subdivided into the microregions of Říčany Plateau and Kladno Table.

The area is rich in low peaks. The highest peaks are Na Rovinách at 435 metres (1,427 ft) above sea level, Vinařická hora at 413 metres (1,355 ft) and Hradinovský kopec at 410 metres (1,345 ft). Other notable hills are Teleček, which is at 399 metres (1,309 ft) the highest point of Prague, and Slánská hora at 330 metres (1,083 ft), which is a significant landscape feature.

== Geography ==
The territory roughly stretches from the northwest (Slaný) to the southeast (Říčany). The plateau has an area of 1,128 square kilometres (436 sq mi) and an average elevation of 302.5 metres (992 ft).

The area is crossed by the Vltava river valley, which forms the so-called Prague Valley. Other watercourses include mostly small tributaries of the Vltava, the longest of which are the streams Rokytka and Botič.

Most of Prague, after which the mesoregion is named, lies in the territory of Prague Plateau. Other large settlements in the territory are Kladno, Slaný, Jesenice, Hostivice and Úvaly, and partly Kralupy nad Vltavou and Říčany.

== Vegetation ==
The landscape is today heavily urbanised, with the more rural areas being sparsely forested and having a predominantly agricultural character. The only part more forested is the southeast, in the area of the Bohemian Karst Protected Landscape Area.

== Gallery ==
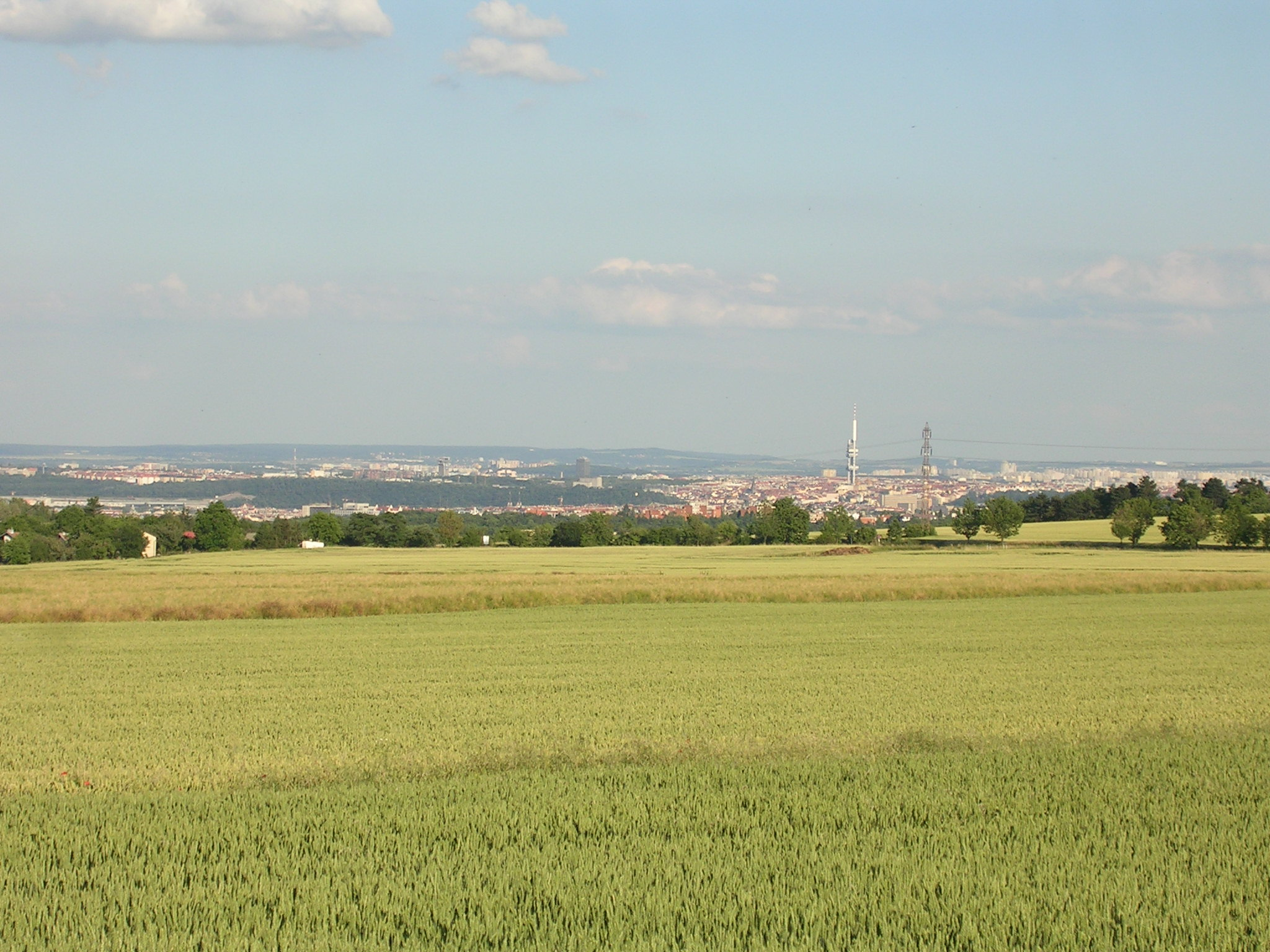
View of Prague from the northwest

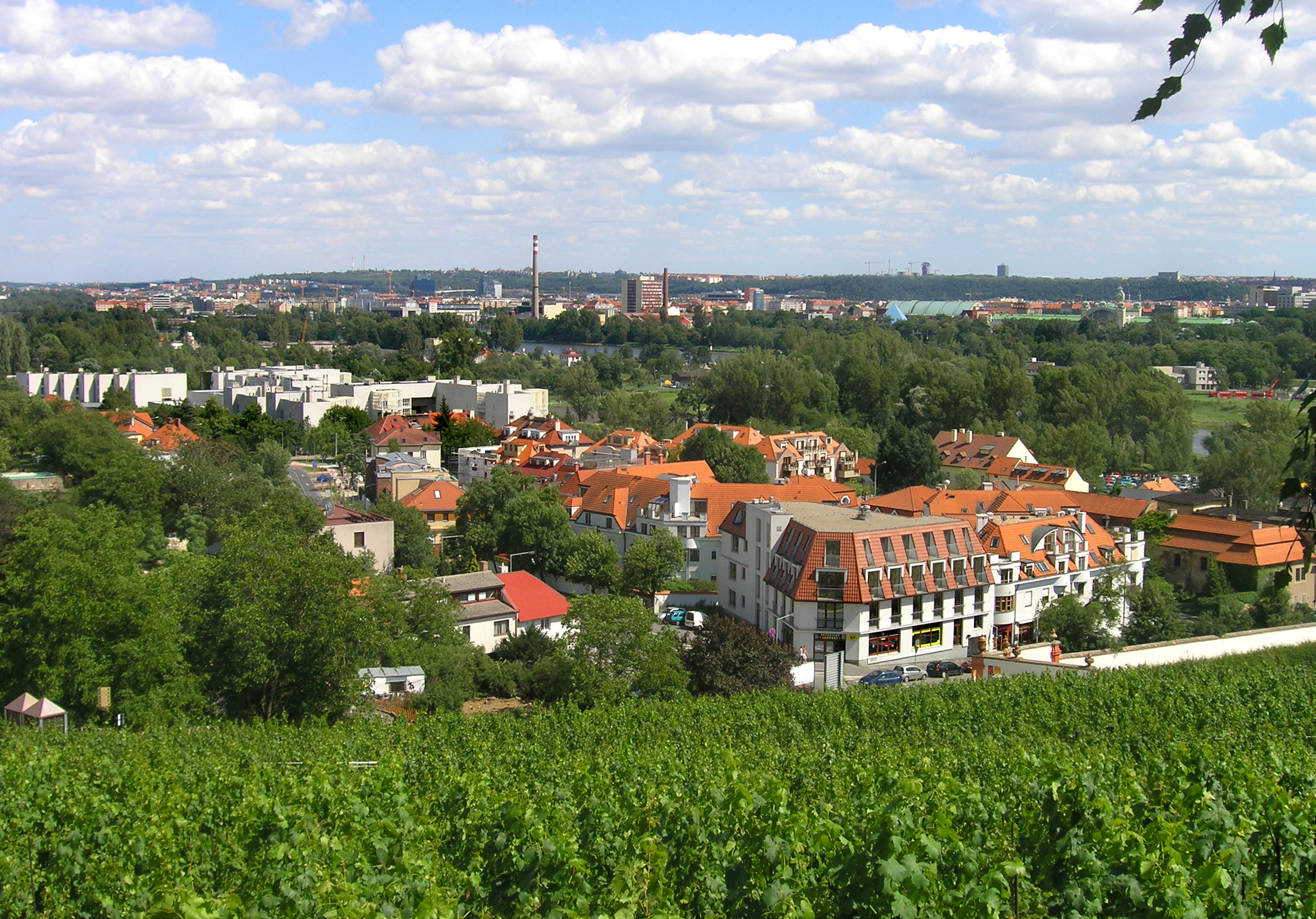
View towards the Prague Valley

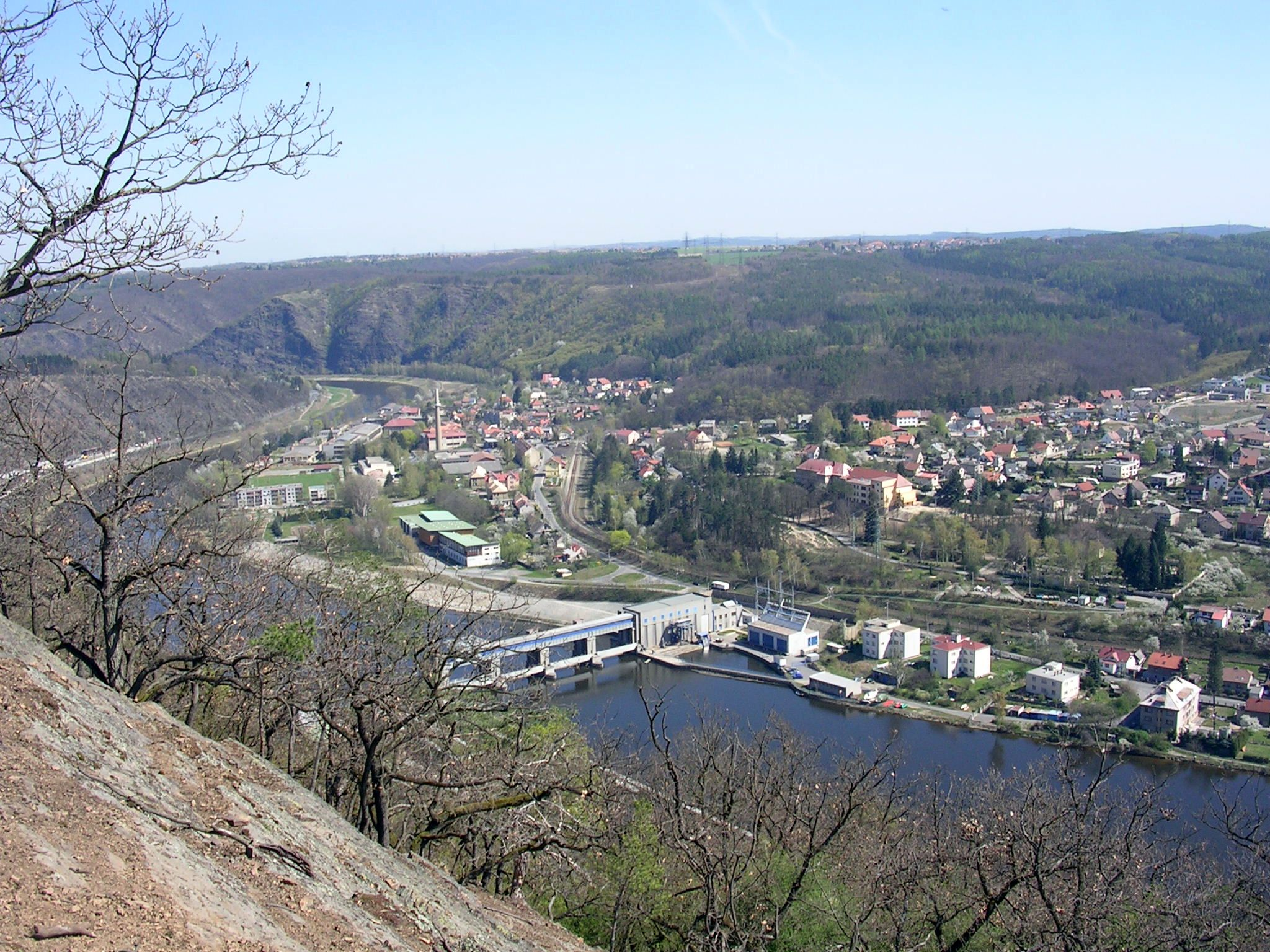
Vrané nad Vltavou in the Vltava valley

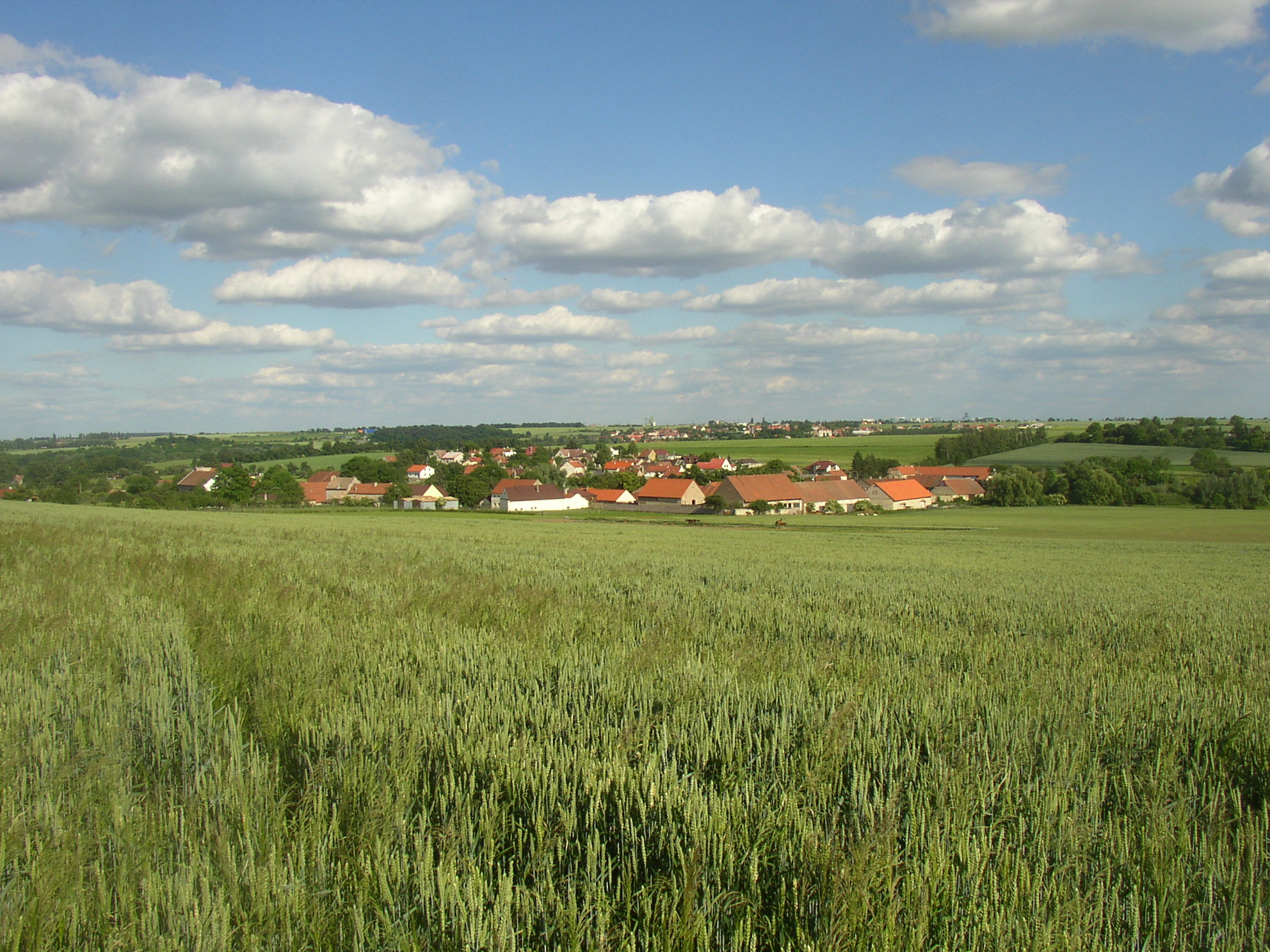
Agricultural landscape near Makotřasy

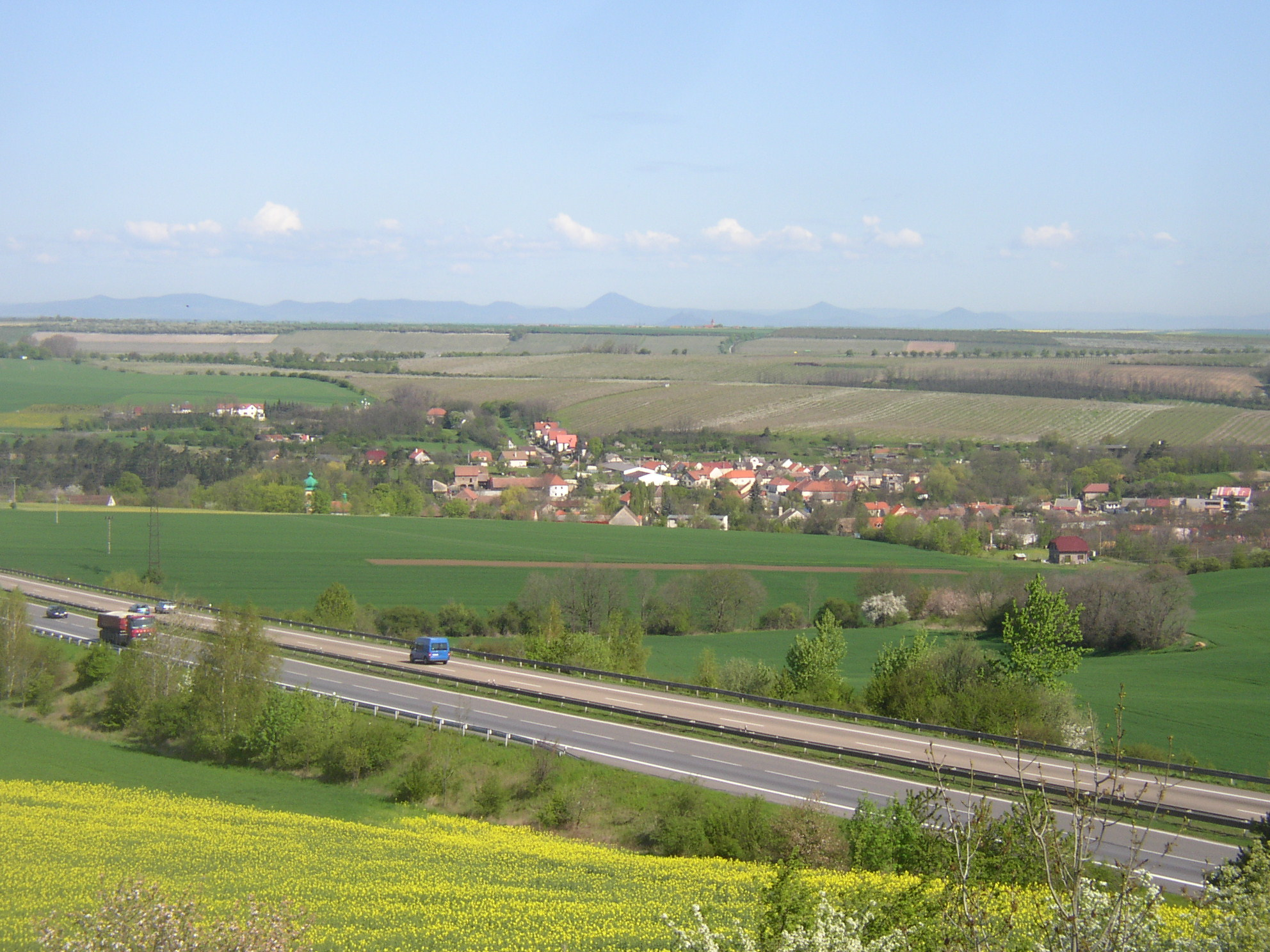
Knovíz
